= Itojo Hospital =

Public hospital in Uganda

- Uganda Ministry of Health
- Location within Uganda

Geography
- Location: Itojo, Ntungamo District, Western Region, Uganda
- Coordinates: 00°47′16″S 30°16′38″E

Organisation
- Care system: Public
- Type: General

Services
- Emergency department: I
- Beds: 120

Links
- Other links: Hospitals in Uganda

Itojo Hospital is a hospital in Itojo, Ntungamo District, in Western Uganda.

== Location ==
Itojo Hospital is located in Itojo Trading Centre, along the Mbarara–Ntungamo–Kabale–Katuna Road, approximately 51 kilometres (32 mi), southwest of Mbarara, the largest city in the sub-region. This location lies approximately 36 kilometres (22 mi) northeast of Ntungamo, the largest town in the district, and the location of the district headquarters. The geographical coordinates of Itojo Hospital are: 0°47'16.0"S, 30°16'38.0"E (Latitude:-0.787778; Longitude:30.277222).

== Overview ==
Itojo hospital is a rural hospital built in the 1968 by the administration of Prime Minister Milton Obote. It serves Ntungamo District and some parts of neighboring Northern Tanzania and Northeastern Rwanda. It has a bed capacity of 120, although sometimes many more patients are admitted, with many sleeping on the floor.

Over the years the hospital infrastructure has deteriorated. In 2006, the then area Member of Parliament, who is also the First Lady of Uganda, Janet Museveni, started to solicit funding from both internal and external sources, to rehabilitate the hospital.

In 2007, the Egyptian Government, through the Egyptian Fund for Technical Cooperation with Africa, donated US$280,000 to rehabilitate the hospital, including the construction of three new staff houses. Egypt also pledged to send three specialists; a surgeon, an obstetrician/gynecologist and a pediatrician, to work at the hospital as part of the assistance package.

The construction work was contracted out to Excel Construction Company Limited, a subsidiary of the Madhvani Group. In June 2011, Egypt donated pharmaceuticals, an electricity generator and other hospital supplies to assist in the rehabilitation of the hospital.

== See also ==
- Hospitals in Uganda
