= Ntungamo–Rukungiri Road =

Road in Uganda

Coordinates: 00°49′57″S 30°02′25″E

Route information
- Length: 32 mi (51 km)
- History: Designated in 2004; Completion in 2005

Major junctions
- East end: Ntungamo
- Kagamba; Nyakibale
- West end: Rukungiri

Location
- Country: Uganda

Highway system
- Roads in Uganda

The Ntungamo–Rukungiri Road in the Western Region of Uganda connects the town of Ntungamo in Ntungamo District with Rukungiri in Rukungiri District.

== Location ==
The road starts at Ntungamo, on the Mbarara–Ntungamo–Kabale–Katuna Road. It takes a northwesterly direction, though the towns of Kagamba, Rwashamaire, and Nyakibale, to end at Rukungiri, the district headquarters of Rukungiri District, a total of approximately 52 kilometres (32 mi).

== Upgrading to bitumen ==
Prior to 2004, the road was gravel surfaced and in a poor state. In that year, the government of Uganda upgraded the road to grade II bitumen surface with shoulders, drainage channels, and culverts.
