= Kisizi =

Kisiizi Kisiizi
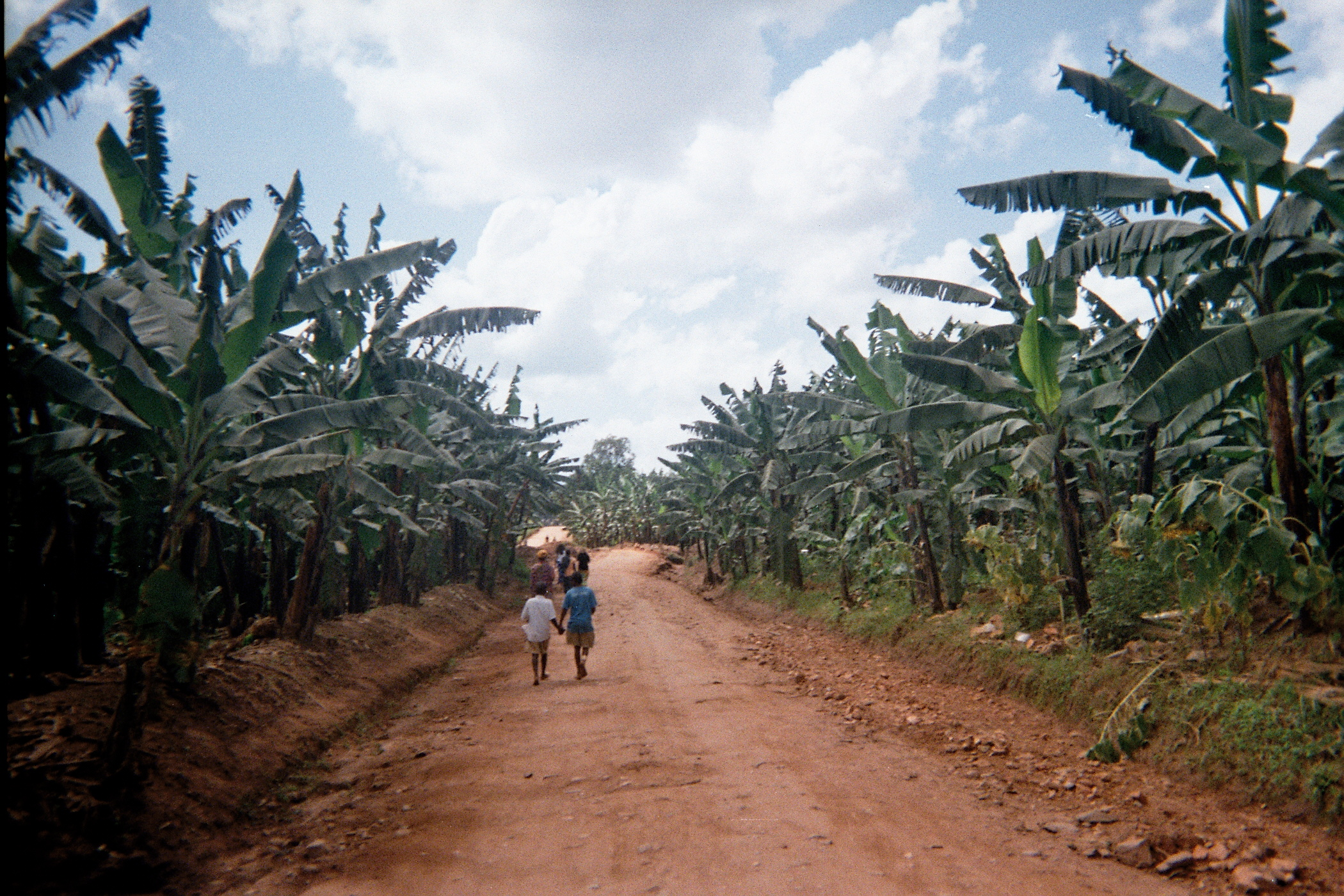

- Location in Uganda
- Coordinates: 0°59′45″S 29°57′44″E
- Country: Uganda
- District: Rukungiri District
- Elevation: 5,380 ft (1,640 m)

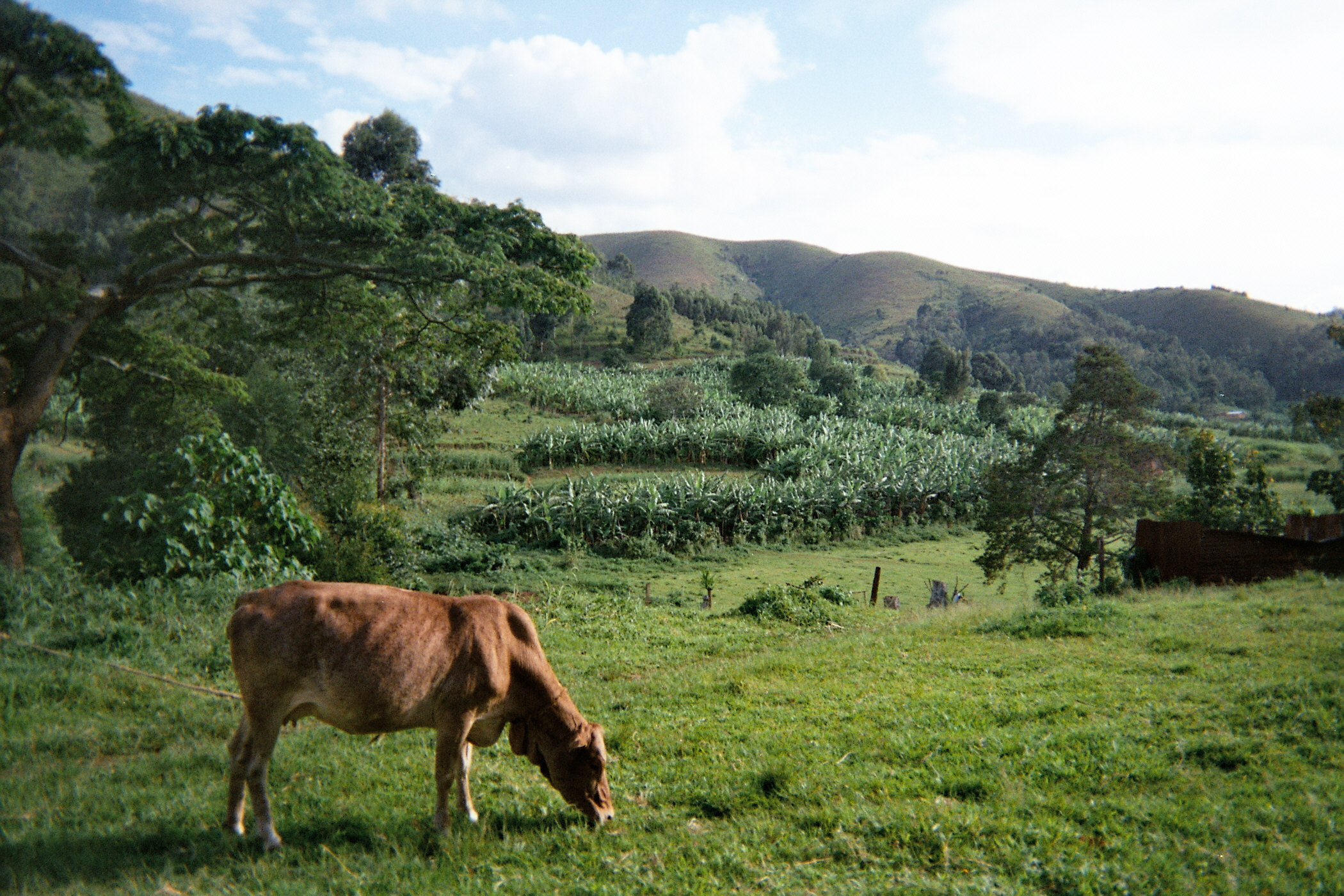
Kisiizi, Uganda, 2005

Kisizi or Kisiizi is a community centred on Kisiizi Hospital in the Rukungiri District of south-west Uganda.

== Location ==
The town of Kisiizi is located in Rukungiri District, in southwestern Uganda, approximately 22 kilometres (14 mi), by road, south of the district headquarters at Rukungiri. This location is approximately 46 kilometres (29 mi), by road, north of Kabale, the largest city in the sub-region. The coordinates of Kisiizi are:00 59 45S, 29 57 44E (Latitude:-0.9956; Longitude:29.9625).

== Overview ==
Kisiizi owes its existence to the presence of Kisiizi Hospital. Kisiizi Hospital also has a primary school, which has close links with a secondary school named Rubirizi Secondary School. The impressive Kisiizi Falls tourism site was launched in 2017 around the beautiful waterfall and includes SkyTrail, a high-altitude high-adrenaline 3-stage zipline as well as a stunning monument, suspension bridge, small cave and lagoon and Visitors Centre . The town is split into upper and lower Kisiizi, separated by a distance of about a five (5) minutes journey by car. Both the primary school and hospital are located in lower Kisiizi, along with a small market, an internet cafe, and various residential buildings. Upper Kisiizi consists mainly of shops and housing with a number of small bars.

== Kisiizi Power Station ==
Kisiizi Waterfall is the site of a hydroelectric dam project, completed in 2008. The hospital's water engineer, Charles Swainson, is the head of the project. The current turbine produces 300 kW (0.3MW) of power. It replaced a much smaller turbine that could only produce 60 kW (0.06MW). The new power station was inaugurated at Kisiizi Hospital's Golden Jubilee weekend 14–16 November 2008 when there was a time of celebration and thanksgiving for the work and ministry of the hospital in its first 50 years. The surplus power generated by the new station is shared with the other institutions within the hospital complex and the rest is sold to the neighboring community to generate operational funds for the station.

== Population ==
As of January 2010, the exact population of Kisiizi is not known. Most of the locals speak Rukiga.

== Hospital ==
Kisiizi Hospital was established in 1958 and is run by the Church of Uganda. Kisiizi Hospital provides a wide range of services and patients travel from a wide catchment area to access care. The hospital receives support from Friends of Kisiizi and has had donations towards new buildings from Ireland including St. Andrew's College, Dublin, and St. Paul's Church in Dublin. The only local church is located at the center of the hospital complex. There are a steady stream of visits by Western medical students. Friends of Kisiizi in the United Kingdom, has an annual Friends Day.

== Landmarks ==
The landmarks within Kisiizi, or close to its borders include:

- Kisiizi Hospital - A 285-bed, private not-for-profit community hospital administered by the Church of Uganda.
- Kisiizi Falls Tourism Park with a waterfall, extraordinary monument, suspension bridge, small cave and lagoon as well as the SkyTrail zipline which runs high above the Falls in 3 stages.
- Kisiizi Hospital Community Insurance Scheme, the oldest in Uganda with over 40,000 beneficiaries in 5 Districts in 206 community groups as at Feb 2018.
- Kisiizi Power Station - A 300 kW hydroelectric power station owned and operated by Kisiizi Power Company Limited, a subsidiary company of Kisiizi Hospital
- Kisiizi Hospital School Of Nursing - A nursing school owned and operated by Kisiizi Hospital
- Kisiizi Hospital Primary School - A community primary school owned by Kisiizi Hospital
- Rubirizi Secondary School - A secondary school, not owned by Kisiizi Hospital
- Kisiizi Central Market - The largest source of fresh produce in Kisiizi

== See also ==
- Kisiizi Hospital
- Kisiizi Power Station
- Rukungiri District
