= Kagamba =

- Location in Uganda
- Coordinates: 00°49′05″S 30°09′36″E
- Country: Uganda
- Region: Western Region of Uganda
- Sub-region: Ankole sub-region
- District: Ntungamo District
- Elevation: 3,220 ft (980 m)

Kagamba is a town in the Ntungamo District of the Western Region of Uganda.

== Location ==
Kagamba is located approximately 15 kilometres (9 mi) west of Ntungamo, on the Ntungamo-Rukungiri road. The coordinates of the town are 0°49'05.0"S, 30°09'36.0"E (Latitude:-0.8181; Longitude:30.1600).

== Points of interest ==
The following points of interest lie within Kagamba or near its borders:

- Kagamba Roman Catholic Parish Church, affiliated with the Roman Catholic Archdiocese of Mbarara
- southern end of the 36.5 kilometres (23 mi) Ishaka–Kagamba Road.
- Ntungamo–Rukungiri Road, passing through the town in a general southeast to northwest direction.

== See also ==
- Transport in Uganda
- List of roads in Uganda
- List of cities and towns in Uganda
- Economy of Uganda
