= Kisiizi Hydroelectric Power Station =

Kisiizi Power Station
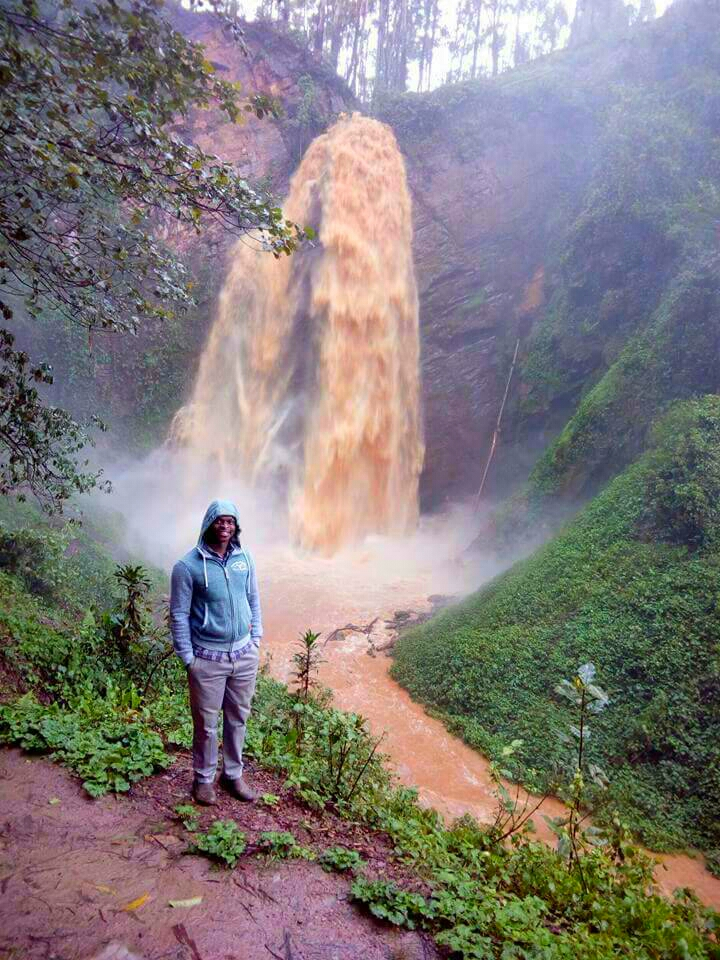
- Kisiizi falls in a rainy season

- Map of Uganda showing the location of Kisiizi
- Country: Uganda
- Location: Kisiizi
- Coordinates: 00°59′44″S 29°57′45″E
- Status: Operational
- Construction cost: $700,000

Reservoir
- Normal elevation: 1,640 m (5,380 ft)

Power Station
- Commission date: 2008
- Type: Run-of-the-river
- Turbines: 1
- Installed capacity: 0.3 MW (400 hp)

Kisiizi Power Station is a 0.294 MW (394 hp) hydroelectric power station in Uganda.

== Location ==
The power station is located at the site of Kisiizi Waterfall, in the town of Kisiizi, Rukungiri District, in Western Uganda. This location is approximately 22 kilometres (14 mi), by road, south of Rukungiri, where the district headquarters are located. Kisiizi is located approximately 46 kilometres (29 mi), by road, north of Kabale, the largest city in the sub-region.

== Overview ==
Kisiizi Power Station is the property of Kisiizi Power Company Limited, a wholly owned subsidiary of Kisiizi Hospital, a private, missionary hospital administered by the Church of Uganda, and is supported by an NGO based in the United Kingdom, known as Friends of Kisiizi. The current power station with capacity of 294 kW (0.3MW) was commissioned in 2008. It replaced an older power plant with a maximum capacity of only 60 kW (0.06MW). The power from the station is used by the hospital and its affiliated institutions. The surplus is sold to the greater Kisiizi community, including businesses and private homes.

== See also ==
- List of power stations in Uganda
- List of hydropower stations in Africa
