= Patience Museveni Rwabwogo =

Ugandan fashion designer (born 1976)

Patience Rwabogo
- Born: May 9, 1978 (age 48); Tanzania
- Citizenship: Ugandan
- Years active: 2006–present
- Parents: Yoweri Museveni (father); Janet Museveni (mother)
- Relatives: Muhoozi Kainerugaba (brother); Natasha Karugire (sister); Diana Museveni (sister)

Patience Rwabwogo (née Patience Kokundeka Museveni; born 09 May 1978) is a Ugandan evangelical priest. She is the daughter of Ugandan President Yoweri Museveni and First Lady Janet Museveni. She is the founder and lead pastor of the Covenant Nations Church in Luzira, Kampala, Uganda. She has 20 years of shepherding experience.

== Early life ==
Patience was born into the family of Yoweri Museveni and Janet Museveni, where she is the first daughter. She was raised on a strong foundation of faith.

== Education ==
Patience studied at University of Minnesota, USA.

== Career ==
Patience Rwabogo is a businesswoman who started a grain milling business after her studies at Minnesota and has since been involved in various ventures especially agriculture.

Rwabogo pursued her career in Christian ministry, and is the founder and lead pastor at the Covenant Nations Churches. She was later consecrated as an Episcopal Bishop of Covenant Nations Churches by Apostle Alex Mitala, Bishop Simon Peter Emiau, Archbishop Moses Odongo, Pastor Adeboye, Bishop Joshua Lwere, ads Bishop D. LaDonna Osbor onn 23 August 2026 .

== Personal life ==
Patience is married to Odrek Rwabwogo; the couple wedded on 20th July 2002 and have our children.

== See also ==
- Yoweri Museveni
- Janet Museveni
- Religion in Uganda
