= Museveni (surname) =

Museveni is a surname. Notable people with the surname include:

- Janet Museveni (born 1948), Ugandan politician, wife of Yoweri
- Yoweri Museveni (born 1944), Ugandan politician
