= 27 Guns =

Ugandan liberation film

- Official poster
- Directed by: Natasha Museveni Karugire; Sharpe Ssewali
- Written by: Natasha Museveni Karugire
- Based on: Ugandan Bush War
- Produced by: Esteri Akandwanaho; Edwin Karugire; Enock Ikiriza
- Starring: Arnold Mubangizi; Diana Museveni Kamuntu; Sezi Jedediah Nuwewenka; Godwin Ahimbisibwe
- Cinematography: Mustaque Abdallah; Royb Kilama Roy
- Music by: Esther Nabaasa; Daniel Murungi
- Production company: Isaiah 60 Productions
- Distributed by: Isaiah 60 Productions
- Release dates: September 8, 2018 (Uganda); September 19, 2018 (South Africa)
- Country: Uganda
- Languages: English, Swahili

27 Guns is an action, adventure biopic film about Yoweri Museveni and his military colleagues during the Ugandan Bush War. It was directed by Natasha Museveni Karugire, Yoweri Museveni's daughter, and premiered in Kampala on September 8, 2018 and was later screened in Johannesburg South Africa on September 19.

== Casting ==
The lead role of Yoweri Kaguta Museveni was given to Arnold Mubangizi as his debut role. Diana Museveni Kyaremera played her mother Janet Kataha Museni

- Arnold Mubangizi - Yoweri Kaguta Museveni
- Diana Museveni Kyaremera - Janet Kataha Museni
- Sezi Jedediah Nuwewenka - Salim Saleh
- Godwin Ahimbisibwe - Akanga Byaruhanga
- Precious Kamwine Amanya - Joy Mirembe
- Daphne Ampire - Joviah Saleh
- Einstein Ayebare - Sam Katabarwa
- T. Steve Ayeny - Julius Oketta
- Geofrey Bukenya - Sam Magara
- Patrick Kabayo - Fred Nkuranga Rubereza
- Diana Kahunde - Berna Karugaba
- Daniel Kandiho - Fred Mugisha
- Bint Kasede - Kizza Besigye
- Allan Katongole - Moses Kigongo
- Alvin Katungi - Chef Ali
- Kenny Katuramu - Pecos Kutesa
- Aggie Kebirungi - Dora Kutesa
- Aganza Kisaka - Proscovia Nalweyiso
- Cleopatra Koheirwe - Alice Kaboyo
- Timothy Magara - Andrew Lutaaya
- John Magyezi - Fred Rwigyema
- Patrick Massa - Ruhakana Rugunda
- Melvin Mukasa - Jim Muhwezi
- Daniel Murungi - Arthur Kasasira
- Elvis Edward Mutebi - Matayo Kyaligonza
- Jenkins Mutumba - Elly Tumwine
- Nicholas Nsubuga - Ivan Koreta
- Ivan Ungeyigiu - Julius Chihandae
- Lenz Vivasi - Patrick Lumumba
- Michael Wawuyo Jr.

== Production ==
Shooting for 27 Guns started on August 8, 2017, and went on for ninety days. The film trailer was released in May 2018. The film was shot in Mpigi/ Singo, Buikwe and Kampala with the cast and crew staff stationed at the locations for the entire shoot. Isaiah 60 Productions ran all the production and distribution of the film.
