= Ntungamo =

Town in Uganda

Ntungamo Ntungamo Municipality
- Location in Uganda
- Coordinates: 00°52′55″S 30°15′55″E
- Country: Uganda
- Region: Western Region of Uganda
- Sub-region: Ankole sub-region
- District: Ntungamo District
- Elevation: 4,600 ft (1,400 m)

Population (2014 Census)
  - Total: 18,854.

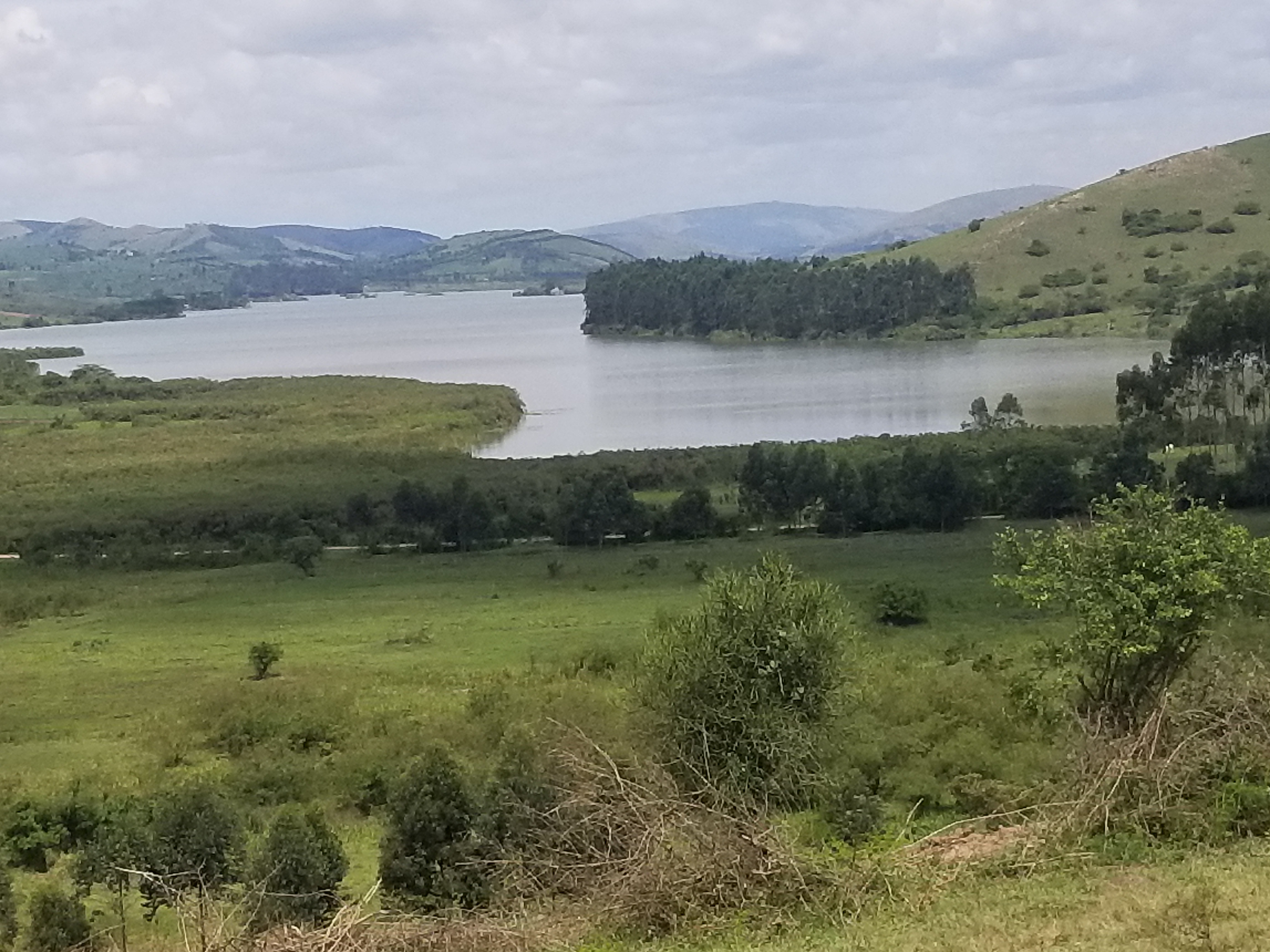
A lake in Kyafola Village in Ntungamo District

Ntungamo is a town in the Western Region of Uganda. It is the largest town in Ntungamo District and the site of the district headquarters.

== Geography ==
Ntungamo is about 65 kilometres (40 mi) southwest of the city of Mbarara, the largest city in Uganda's Western Region. It is approximately 78 kilometres (48 mi), by road, northeast of Kabale City, along the Mbarara–Ntungamo–Kabale–Katuna Road.

== Overview ==
Ntungamo is a growing town, located on the Mbarara-Kabale highway. A tarmacked road branches off at Ntungamo to lead to Rukungiri. The town, as of November 2013, was grappling with rapid growth, sanitation, and water supply issues.

== Population ==
The 2002 national census put the population of the town at 13,320. In 2010, the Uganda Bureau of Statistics (UBOS) estimated the population at 16,100. In 2011, UBOS estimated the mid-year population at 16,400. In 2014, the national population census conducted in August that year put the population at 18,854.

In 2015, the population of Ntungamo Municipality was projected at 31,700. In 2020, the mid-year population of the town was projected at 38,800. It was calculated that the population of Ntungamo Town grew at an average annual rate of 1.9 percent, between 2015 and 2020.

Historical population
Year	Pop.	±%
2002	13,320	—
2010	16,100	+20.9%
2011	16,400	+1.9%
2014	18,854	+15.0%
2015	31,700	+68.1%
2020	38,800	+22.4%

== Points of interest ==
The following additional points of interest lie within or close to the town limits:

- The offices of Ntungamo Town Council
- Ntungamo Central Market
- Karegyeya Rock Shelter
- Itojo Hospital, a 120-bed public hospital owned by the Uganda Ministry of Health, and administered by the Ntungamo District Local administration. It is located 22 kilometres (14 mi), northeast of Ntungamo, on the Mbarara-Kabale Road.
- The Ntungamo-Rukungiri Road, an all-tarmac road, starting here and ending in Rukungiri, 51 kilometres (32 mi) to the northwest
- The Mbarara–Ntungamo–Kabale–Katuna Road passes through the town in a general north to south direction.
- 99.3 Radio Ankole, a local radio station broadcasting in Ntungamo and neighboring districts in Runyankore/Rukiga, Kinyarwanda and English

== Notable people ==
- Eriya Kategaya, politician and lawyer, born, raised, and buried here
- Janet Museveni, politician and wife of president Yoweri Museveni, born here in 1948
- Yoweri Museveni, military general and politician, president of Uganda since 1986; he and his wife maintain a home in the town

== See also ==
- List of cities and towns in Uganda
- List of roads in Uganda
