= Kisiizi Hospital =

Church-owned community hospital

Coordinates: 00°59′45″S 29°57′44″E

- Church of Uganda
- Location within Uganda

Geography
- Location: Kisiizi, Rukungiri District, Uganda

Organisation
- Care system: Community hospital
- Type: General and specialist
- Affiliated university: Church of Uganda

Services
- Emergency department: I
- Beds: 260

History
- Founded: 1958; 68 years ago

Links
- Website: Homepage
- Lists: Hospitals in Uganda
- Other links: Hospitals in Uganda

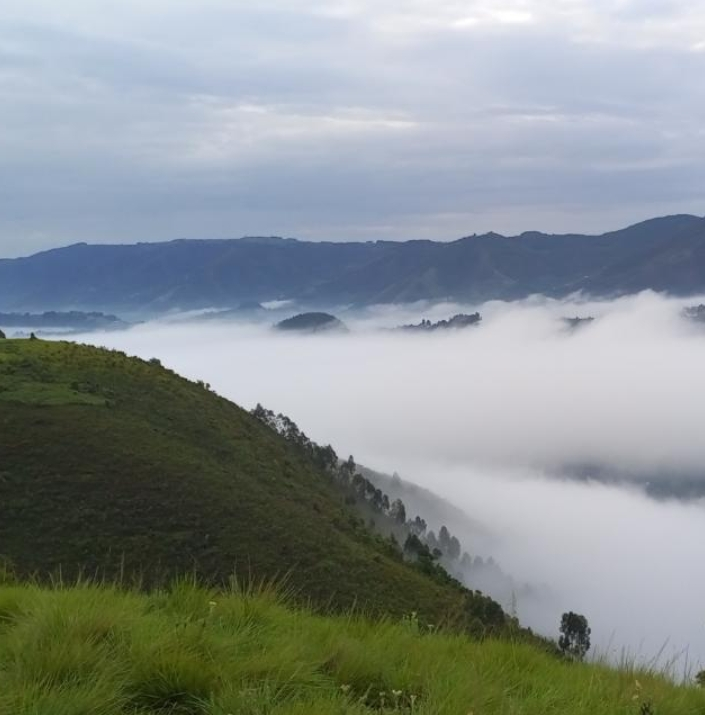
Under the fog is Kisiizi C.O.U Hospital that runs a hydro power plant on river Rushuma that serves energy to the community down there.

Kisiizi Hospital is a community hospital in Uganda. It is affiliated with the Anglican Church of Uganda.

== Location ==
The hospital is located in the town of Kisiizi in Rukungiri District, in the Kigezi sub-region of the Western Region of Uganda. Kisiizi Hospital is approximately 43 kilometres (27 mi) south of Rukungiri, where the district headquarters are located. This location is also approximately 42 kilometres (26 mi) north of Kabale, the largest city in the Kigezi sub-region. The geographical coordinates of the hospital are:00°59'53.0"S, 29°56'37.0"E (Latitude:-0.998056; Longitude:29.943611).

== Overview ==
The hospital is a private non-profit institution with a bed capacity of 250 plus 10 cots/incubators in the Special Care Baby Unit. The hospital is a fee-paying hospital, although no one is turned away due to inability to pay. The fees collected from the patients cover only about 40 percent of the total hospital expenses. To supplement that income, the hospital operates several other businesses whose revenue augments the hospital's financial and social responsibilities. The hospital also receives charitable contributions from supporters within Uganda and from overseas.

Kisiizi Hospital was founded by missionary John Sharp in 1958 and was later taken over by the North Kigezi Diocese of the Church of Uganda. The following subsidiaries are owned by Kisiizi Hospital either in full or in part. These services help to deliver a more holistic lifestyle to the community, which otherwise is very rural and very poor.

== Subsidiaries ==
The first subsidiary is Kisiizi Hospital Primary School, a mixed day and boarding primary school, which takes in students from hospital staff and the community, with 403 students, and 13 teachers, as of August 2018.

The second subsidiary is Kisiizi Hospital School of Nursing. This teaching institution, was established in 1998 and trains nurses and midwives. Its total enrollment is 200 students.

The third subsidiary is Kisiizi Hospital Power Limited, the owner/operator of the Kisiizi Power Station, a 300 kilowatts (0.30 MW) hydroelectric project that supplies the hospital and affiliated subsidiary institutions. The surplus power is sold to the community, including businesses and residences.

The fourth affiliated operation is the Kisiizi Hospital Health Insurance Scheme. The scheme, operated in conjunction with Savings and Credit Cooperative Societies (Saccos), in the community. The saccos collect health premiums from their members, from which they pay the hospital bills for covered illnesses. Not all conditions are covered, but the scheme protects patients from financial ruin from routine illnesses and the hospital gets paid something instead of nothing when the patient lacks cash. As of 2017 the scheme had 38,400 enrollees.

== See also ==
- Hospitals in Uganda
- Kisiizi
