= Joselyn Kamateneti =

Ugandan accountants and politician (born 1982)

Woman Member of Parliament
- In office 2021–2026
- Constituency: Ntungamo District

Personal details
- Born: 16 April 1982 (age 44) Nyabushenyi Village, Nyabushenyi Sub-county, Ntungamo District, Uganda
- Spouse: Sande Baata-Kaketto
- Children: 4
- Education: Makerere University (BCom in Finance)
- Occupation: Accountant, Politician
- Profession: Accountant, Businesswoman

Joselyn Kamateneti (born April 16, 1982) is a Ugandan accountant and politician, who serves as the woman member of parliament for Ntungamo district in the 11th parliament of Uganda (2021 to 2026).

== Early life and education ==
Joselyn Kamateneti was born on April 16, 1982 in Nyabushenyi village, Nyabushenyi sub-county, Ntungamo district, in the Western region of Uganda to the late Tadeo Kanyankore-Kakiga and Norah Twinomugisha.

She attended Nyakisa Primary School for her primary education, Hornby High School in Kabale for her O'level and thereafter moved to Immaculate Heart Nyakibare Girls' Secondary School for A'level.

Later she joined Makerere University, Kampala, where she pursued her bachelor's degree in commerce, specialising in finance.

== Career ==
Kamateneti is the current woman Member of Parliament for Ntungamo district in the 11th parliament. The survey conducted by Vision Group shown that her voters support her contributions, trustworthiness and transparent approach towards service delivery in their area.

She worked with Crane Bank Uganda, before joining Bank of Uganda where she was working as an accountant. Before joining politics, she was running a business in Kampala dealing in printery and stationery.

== Personal life ==
Joselyn Kamateneti is married to Sande Baata-Kaketto who is the former district councillor of Nyabihoko sub-county, Ntungamo district and they have four children.

== See also ==
- List of members of the eleventh Parliament of Uganda
- Otuke District
- Parliament of Uganda
- Julius Bua Acon
