= Betty Muzanira =

Ugandan politician

Hon. Betty Muzanira Bamukwatsa
- Born: 3 September 1968 (age 58)
- Other name: Tr. Betty
- Occupations: Teacher and Politician
- Successor: Hon. Medius Kaharata
- Political party: FDC

Betty Muzanira Bamukwatsa (born 3 September 1968) is a Ugandan politician and a previous women member of Parliament for Rukungiri District, western Uganda.

== Background and education ==
Muzanira was born in Bwera village, Rushasha parish, Nyakagyeme subcounty in Rujumbura constituency, Rukungiri district. She was born to Stanley Katakara and Veronica Buhenda.

Muzanira holds a Bachelor's degree of Arts in Primary Education from Uganda Martyrs University , Nkozi. She enrolled for a Grade III Teachers' certificate at Rukungiri Teachers College Nyakaina. Later on she upgraded to a Diploma in Primary education from the National Teachers' college Kakoba in Mbarara.

== Career ==
Muzanira began her career as an educationist and a teacher where she has taught thousands of pupils at nursery level for over twenty years. She taught in different schools including Rukungiri Modern primary school and Rukungiri universal primary school, and founded her own kindergarten in 2005, LittleAngels infants Primary school in Rukungiri. Muzanira also served on numerous boards for schools, religious institutions, health institutions and other organisations.

During this period, she became popularly known as 'Teacher Betty'.

== Political career ==
Muzanira began her political journey as the Chairperson LC3 for Rukungiri town council between the year 2001 and 2006. Later, she became a district councillor representing Rwakabengo ward in Rukungiri municipal council. Here, she also served as the Vice chairperson of the National Urban Speakers Association at the national level and at one point served as the Club president, Rotary club of Rukungiri.

On June 1, 2018, Muzanira was announced as the woman member of parliament under FDC (Forum for Democratic Change) after winning a by-election.

== Achievements ==
- 2001 - voted chairperson LC3 Rukungiri town council
- 2007- became district councillor for Rukungiri Municipal council
- 2018 - elected women member of parliament Rukungiri district

== Controversy ==
Muzanira was involved in a court case at Kabale High Court in 2016 where she was a complainant about a vote rigging action carried out in the 2016 elections. This case was later sent to the supreme court and a by-election was ordered to be carried out in Rukungiri district.

== Personal life ==
Betty Muzanira is a widowed mother to one child
