= Natasha Museveni Karugire =

Ugandan fashion designer (born 1976)

Natasha Karugire
- Born: Natasha Lynette Nyinancwende Kainembabazi Museveni; March 12, 1976 (age 50); Tanzania
- Other name: Kukuru (family nickname)
- Citizenship: Ugandan
- Education: American Intercontinental University, London
- Occupations: Fashion designer; filmmaker; author; podcaster
- Years active: 2003–present
- Known for: Directing 27 Guns (2018); founding House of Karugire
- Spouse: Edwin Karugire (m. 2000)
- Children: 4
- Parents: Yoweri Museveni (father); Janet Museveni (mother)
- Relatives: Muhoozi Kainerugaba (brother); Patience Museveni Rwabogo (sister); Diana Museveni (sister)

Natasha Karugire (née Natasha Lynette Nyinancwende Kainembabazi Museveni; born 12 March 1976) is a Ugandan fashion designer, filmmaker, author, and podcaster. She is the eldest daughter of Ugandan President Yoweri Museveni and First Lady Janet Museveni. Karugire co-founded Isaiah 60 Productions, through which she directed the biographical film 27 Guns (2018), and established the fashion label House of Karugire in 2003. Her work focuses on promoting Ugandan heritage and the country's creative industries.

== Early life ==
Karugire was born on 12 March 1976 in Tanzania, near Mount Kilimanjaro, during her family's exile from Uganda. Her father, Yoweri Museveni, was leading resistance efforts against the regimes of Idi Amin and Milton Obote, which required the family to live in exile in Tanzania, Sweden, and Kenya until the National Resistance Army's victory in 1986.

Her full birth name carries cultural significance in the Runyankole tradition. "Kainembabazi" translates to "daughter of the savannah," a name she later explored in her memoir.

== Education ==
Karugire attended schools in multiple countries during her family's movements, including Nyeri Complex Primary School in Kenya. She later studied fashion design and fashion marketing at American Intercontinental University in London.

== Career ==
=== Fashion design ===
In 2003, Karugire launched her fashion label, House of Karugire, at Speke Hotel in Kampala. The label later evolved into J & Kainembabazi. Her designs incorporate traditional Ugandan elements, including beading and local fabrics, combined with contemporary styles. She has presented collections at events such as Kampala Fashion Week.

=== Film and media ===
In 2017, Karugire co-founded Isaiah 60 Productions with Esteri Akandwanaho, a production company focused on African storytelling. Her directorial debut, 27 Guns (2018), is a biographical drama depicting the early stages of the Ugandan Bush War, centring on her father's role alongside 26 fighters armed with 27 guns. The film premiered in Kampala and South Africa.

In 2023, she produced the documentary series Those From Among You, which profiles National Resistance Army veterans and examines themes of sacrifice and patriotism.

=== Writing and podcasting ===
Karugire published a memoir, What's in a Name: Kainembabazi – Reflections of the Daughter of the Savannah, in 2020. The book explores her experiences during her family's exile, her family history, and Ugandan heritage.

In December 2023, she launched the podcast An African Podcast for Africans, by Africans, which discusses cultural topics and perspectives relevant to the African continent.

=== Cultural advocacy ===
Karugire founded the Heritage Foundation, an organisation dedicated to preserving and promoting Ugandan history and culture. Through her films, documentaries, and various initiatives, she works to educate younger generations about Ugandan heritage.

== Public perception ==
In 2024, false claims circulated online suggesting she had been appointed Governor of the Bank of Uganda, a position held by Michael Atingi-Ego. Fact-checking organisations, including AFP Fact Check and PesaCheck, identified these claims as misinformation.

== Personal life ==
Natasha met lawyer and businessman Edwin Karugire in the 1990s, and they married 1st September 2000. The couple have four children. Edwin Karugire serves as the Partner at K&K Advocates a leading law firm in Uganda.

== Filmography ==
- 27 Guns (2018) – director
- Those From Among You (2023) – producer

== Works ==
- What's in a Name: Kainembabazi – Reflections of the Daughter of the Savannah (2020)
