= University Students' African Revolutionary Front =

Political student group

The University Students' African Revolutionary Front (USARF) was a political student group formed in 1967 at the University of Dar es Salaam in Tanzania. The group, which engaged in study and activism and held regular meetings on Sundays, featured many students who would go on to become influential politicians. USARF was composed of students from Kenya, Zambia, Malawi, Zimbabwe, Ethiopia, Sudan, Tanzania, Uganda and elsewhere in Africa. President of Uganda, Yoweri Museveni was elected its chairman for the whole time he was at university. John Garang, another former USARF member, was the vice-president of Sudan at the time of his death in July 2005. The group identified closely with African liberation movements, especially FRELIMO in Mozambique.

== Alumni ==
Malawi

- Kapote Mwakasungura

Sudan

- John Garang

Tanzania

- Charles Kileo
- Salim Msoma
- Adam Marwa
- Patrick Quoro
- Andrew Shija
- Joatham Mwijage Mporogoma Kamala

Uganda

- Yoweri Museveni
- Eriya Kategaya
- James Wapakhabulo
- Joseph Mulwanyamuli Ssemwogerere
- John Kawangaall
