= Egyptian Fund for Technical Cooperation with Africa =

Egyptian governmental instrument

Department overview
- Formed: 1980
- Headquarters: Egypt Ministry of Foreign Affairs Building; Cairo
- Department executives: Boutros Boutros Ghali, Founder; Ambassador Soad Shalaby, Secretary General

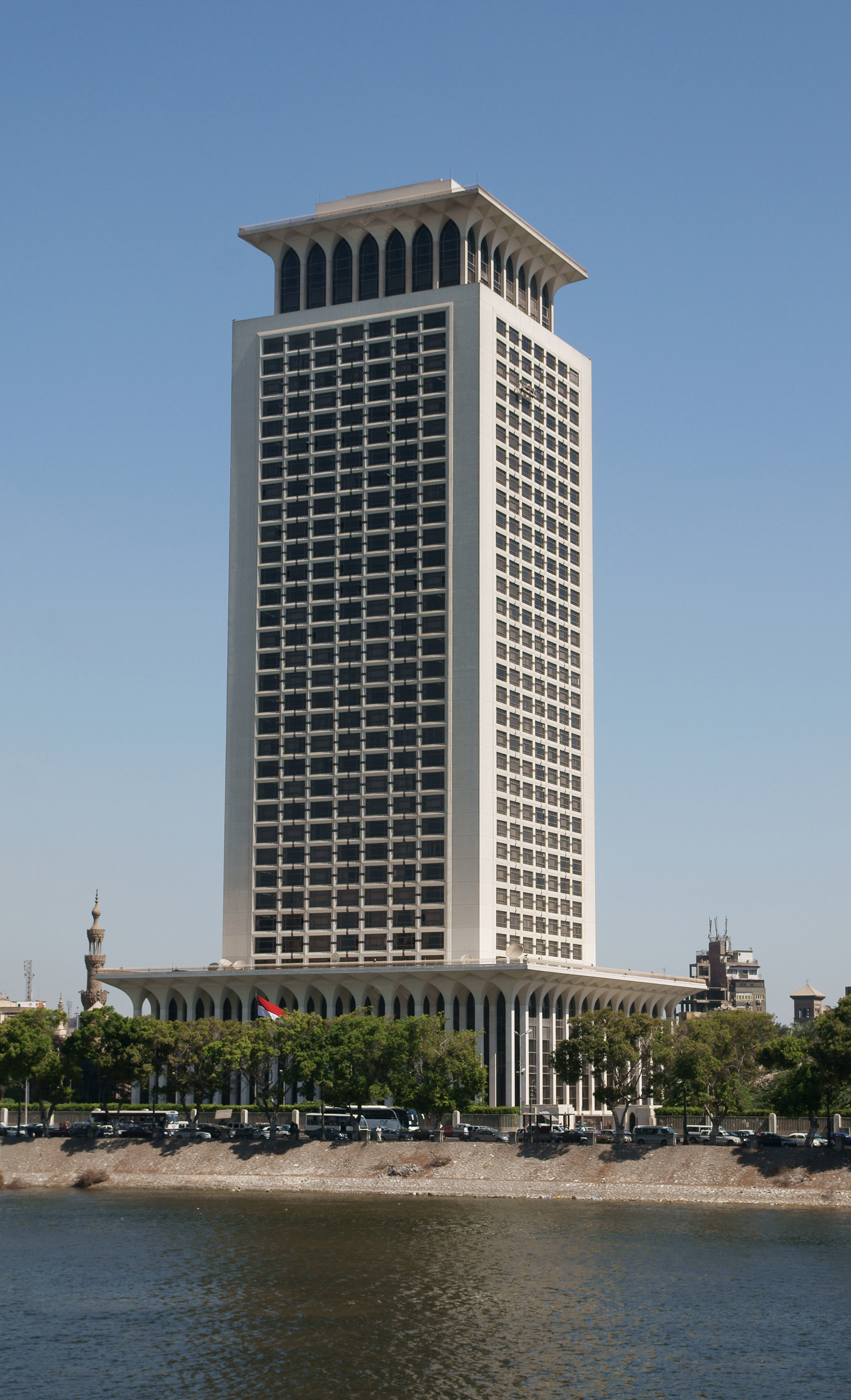
EFTCA is situated in the Egyptian Foreign Ministry headquarter, Cairo

The Egyptian Fund for Technical Cooperation with Africa (Arabic: الصندوق المصري للتعاون الفني مع أفريقيا) commonly known by the acronym "EFTCA" was the Egyptian governmental instrument that coordinates official development assistance and development cooperation programs with African countries. The head of the (EFTCA) was the Egyptian Minister of State for Foreign Affairs Boutros Boutros Ghali while its Secretary general was Ambassador Soad Shalaby who was considered the real manager.

== History ==
The EFTCA was established in 1980 on a proposal submitted by Boutros Boutros-Ghali the former Vice Foreign Minister of Egypt to late Egyptian president Anwar El Sadat as a new approach to help Africa and to consolidate Egypt's pivotal role in the continent in the post decolonization era. As Egypt played historical role in supporting the African liberation movements in their struggle against Colonization and racial discrimination under the rule of the late Egyptian president Nasser. The EFTCA is considered a part of the Egyptian Ministry of Foreign Affairs with an independent budget and has its development cooperation programs that cover most of the African continent.

Since its establishment in 1980, "EFTCA" contributed effectively in building capacities and developing human resources in African countries aiming at attaining sustainable development across the continent through dispatching more than 8,500 Egyptian experts in all disciplines, like medicine, engineering, agriculture, irrigation, water resources and education, as well as affording training courses to nearly 10,000 African trainees in all fields in Egypt. The EFTCA also offers financial grants for certain domains like health and agriculture. In 2013, both the Egyptian Fund for Technical Cooperation with Africa and the Egyptian Fund for Technical Cooperation with the Commonwealth were merged together creating the Egyptian Agency of Partnership for Development.

== Activities ==
EFTCA aims to work on a public-benefit basis according to the formula of supporting South-South Cooperation, through providing technical cooperation and capital grants to African countries. EFTCA's developmental programs (aid modalities) focuses mainly on technical assistance programs/projects for capacity and institutional development.

Major aid modalities

- Technical assistance programs/projects for capacity and institutional development.
- Dispatching of Experts.
- Dispatching medical convoys.
- Providing humanitarian assistance in case of natural disasters.

== See also ==
- List of development aid agencies
- Development aid
- Ministry of Foreign Affairs (Egypt)
