= Mbarara–Ntungamo–Kabale–Katuna Road =

Road in Uganda

Coordinates: 0°54′10″S 30°15′14″E

Route information
- Length: 77.7 mi (125.0 km)
- History: Designated in 2011; Completion in 2018

Major junctions
- North end: Mbarara
- Ntungamo; Kabale
- South end: Katuna

Location
- Country: Uganda

Highway system
- Roads in Uganda

The Mbarara–Ntungamo–Kabale–Katuna Road in Western Uganda connects the city of Mbarara, in Mbarara District, with the towns of Ntungamo, Kabale and Katuna at the international border with the Republic of Rwanda.

== Location ==
The road starts at Mbarara (pop. 195,238), the largest city in the Western Region of Uganda. It continues in a southwesterly direction through Ntungamo and Kabale to end at Katuna at the international border with Rwanda, a distance of about 125 kilometres (78 mi)

== Upgrading to bitumen ==
In December 2010, the European Union extended a grant of USh325 billion (approximately €116 million at that time), to improve the 125 kilometres (78 mi), stretch of the East African Northern Corridor, between Mbarara and Katuna. The road was divided into two sections: (a) Mbarara-Ntungamo Section, was budgeted at UShs154 billion (€51 million) and (b) Ntungamo-Katuna Section was budgeted at UShs198.26 billion (€65 million). The Ugandan government was budgeted to contribute 8 percent of the grant value (approximately €9.28 million). The construction contract was awarded to Reynolds Construction Company of Switzerland, the lowest bidder. The work was designated in December 2011. Road works involve widening the roadway to 11 metres (36 ft). As of August 2016, Uganda National Roads Authority listed the road as an ongoing project. By May 2018, the last section of this road was reported as completed.

== See also ==
- Economy of Uganda
- Transport in Uganda
- List of roads in Uganda
- Uganda National Roads Authority
