= Ntungamo District =

- District
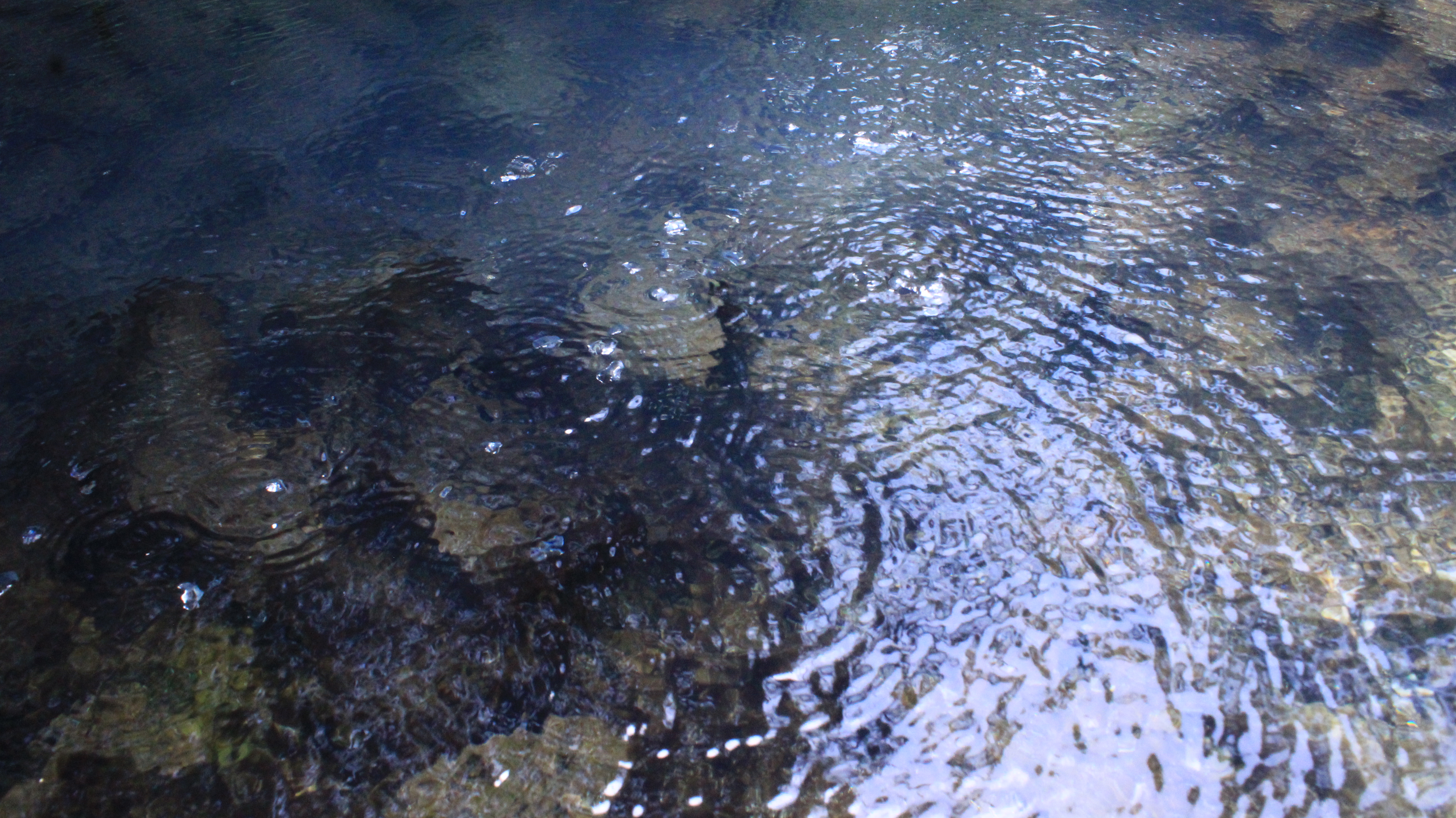
- Hot springs in Ntungamo District

- District location in Uganda
- Coordinates: 00°53′S 30°16′E
- Country: Uganda
- Region: Western Uganda
- Sub-region: Ankole sub-region
- Capital: Ntungamo

Area
  - Total: 2,051 km^{2} (792 sq mi)
  - Water: 74.2 km^{2} (28.6 sq mi)

Population (2012 Estimate)
  - Total: 480,100
  - Density: 234/km^{2} (610/sq mi)
- Time zone: UTC+3 (EAT)
- Area code: 034
- Website: www.ntungamo.go.ug

Ntungamo District is a district in Western Uganda. Like most Ugandan districts, it is named after its 'chief town', Ntungamo, the location of the district headquarters. Ntungamo was elevated to a district on 5 May 1993.

== Overview ==
In the past, Ntungamo District was part of the Ankole Kingdom, a traditional monarchy that dates back to the 18th century. The kingdom was abolished by Milton Obote in 1967. The current President of Uganda, Yoweri Museveni, and his wife, Janet Museveni, were born in the district. The Ankole Kingdom is coterminous with Ankole sub-region, home to an estimated 2.2 million inhabitants in 2002, according to the national census conducted that year.

== Location ==
Hilly green scenery on the Mbarara to Ntungamo road in Western Uganda

Ntungamo District is bordered to the north by Mitooma District, Sheema District and Rwampara District, going from west to east. Isingiro District lies to the east, the Republic of Rwanda to the south, Rukiga District to the southwest and Rukungiri District to the northwest. The district headquarters at Ntungamo, are located about 66 kilometres (41 mi), by road, southwest of Mbarara, the largest city in Ankole sub-region. The general coordinates of the district are: 00 53S, 30 16E. The district covers 2,051.4 square kilometres (792.0 mi^{2}) of which approximately 0.2% is open water, 3.4% is wetland and about 0.01% is forest.

== Population ==
In 1991, the national population census estimated the district population at about 305,200. The national census of 2002 estimated the population of Ntungamo District at about 380,000, with an estimated annual population growth rate of 2.4%. It is estimated that in 2012, the population of the district was approximately 480,100. Based on the Uganda Bureau of Statistics 2020 population projections, the current population now stands at 540,800.

== Tourism in Ntungamo District ==
Tourism in Ntungamo District is not well developed but there are several potential tourism sites, including: 1. Karegyeya Rock 2. Lake Nyabihoko 3. Uganda-Rwanda Border 4. Bird-watching in the wetlands and 5. Agricultural development projects. 6.Kyafola Hot Springs. 7.Rwoho Central Forest Reserve Kirungu

== Notable people ==
- Bernard Rwehururu
- Joselyn Kamateneti
- Credonia Mwerinde
- Joseph Kibweteere, religious leader who disappeared or died in 2000
- Musinguzi Yona, politician

== Economy ==
- coffee
- Maize
- Bananas
- Tourism
- Trade and commance
- Livestock farming

== Livestock ==
- Cattle
- Poultry
- Pigs
- Goat
- and sheep

== See also ==
- Ntungamo
- Mirama Hills
- Ankole
- Yoweri Museveni
- Janet Museveni
- Barbie Kyagulanyi
- Western Uganda
- Uganda Districts
- Kirungu Ntungamo
