= Rukungiri District =

- District
- District location in Uganda
- Coordinates: 00°47′S 29°56′E
- Country: Uganda
- Region: Western Uganda
- Sub-region: Kigezi sub-region
- Established: 1974
- Capital: Rukungiri

Area
  - Land: 1,444.9 km^{2} (557.9 sq mi)
  - Water: 222.4 km^{2} (85.9 sq mi)

Population (2012 Estimate)
  - Total: 321,300
  - Density: 241/km^{2} (620/sq mi)
- Time zone: UTC+3 (EAT)
- Website: www.rukungiri.go.ug

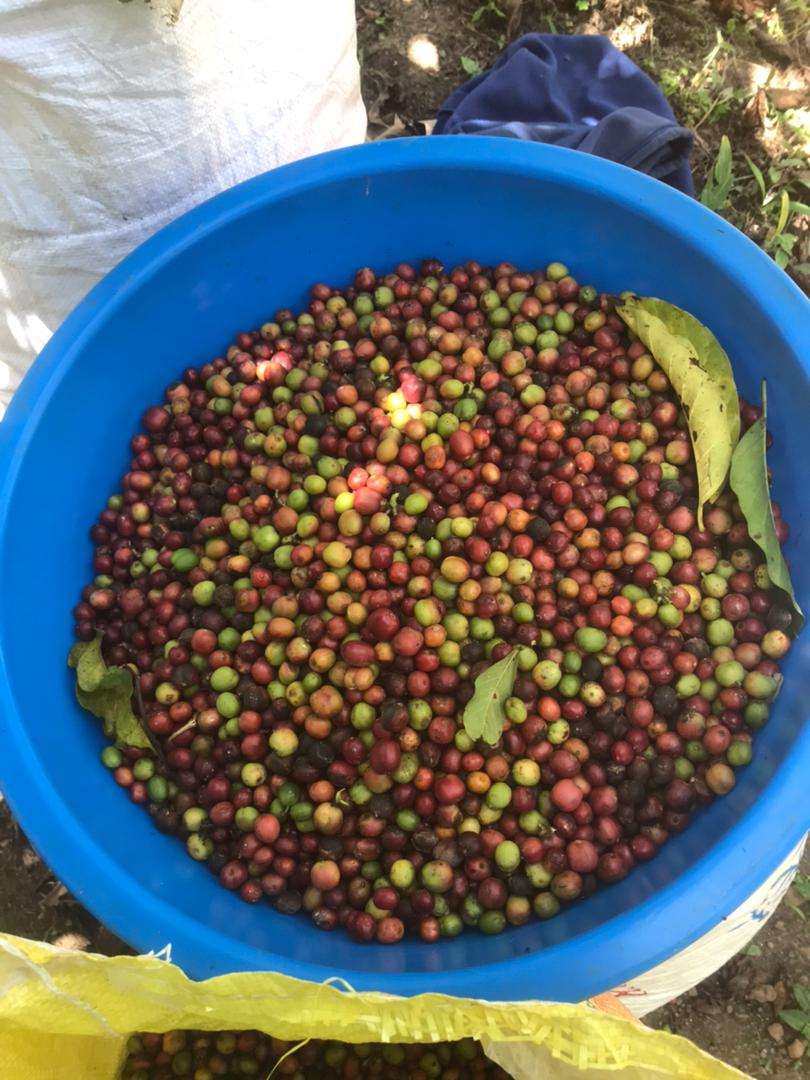
Rubosta coffee in Rukungiri district.

Rukungiri District is a district in the Western Region of Uganda. The town of Rukungiri is the site of the district headquarters.

== Location ==
The district is bordered by Lake Edward to the North West, Rubirizi District to the northeast, Mitooma District to the northeast and east, Ntungamo District to the east and southeast, Rukiga District and Rubanda District to the south, Kanungu District to the west, and the Democratic Republic of the Congo via Lake Edward to the northwest. The district headquarters are approximately 382 kilometres (237 mi), by road, south-west of Kampala, Uganda's capital city.

== Prominent people ==
The district is the birthplace of Kizza Besigye, who was a candidate for the Ugandan presidency in 2001, 2006,2011 and 2016.

Other prominent Ugandans who hail from the district include:

- Allen Kagina former URA Executive Director
- Edmund Paul Kalekyezi, Lawyer and trade advisor to the government of Guyana.
- Philemon Kitaburaza Karegyesa (deceased) former Secretary General of Kigezi
- Hon. Kham Karekaho Karegyesa (deceased) former Minister in Obote 2 Gov't and son of Omukama Karegyesa, king of Rujumbura, Mpororo
- Brian Mushana Kwesiga - entrepreneur, engineer, and civic leader; former president and CEO, Ugandan North American Association (UNAA)
- Maj.Gen. Jim Muhwezi Minister of Security, Member of Parliament representing Rujumbura and former Minister of Education and Sports, former Minister of Health and former ISO Director General also serving as the head of NRM Veterans in the CEC
- Gen. Aronda Nyakairima (deceased), the former minister of internal affairs and former Chief of Defence Forces of the UPDF
- Lt. Gen. Henry Tumukunde, the former Updf Chief of planning, Updf chief of personnel and administration, Updf Commander of 4th division, director of ISO, director of CMI, MP of Rubaabo, Minister of Security and Presidential Candidate in 2021.

== Parliamentary representation ==
The parliamentary representatives of this district are Namanya Naboth (FDC) for Rubabo, Jim Muhwezi(NRM) for Rujumbura, Betty Muzanira (FDC) woman representative and Ronald Kaginda (FDC) Rukungiri Municipality.

== Population ==
In 1991, the population of the district was estimated at 230,100. The 2002 national census estimated the population at 275,200. The district annual population growth rate was calculated at 1.6 percent. In 2012, the population was estimated at 321,300.

== Economic activities ==
Employment in urban centers is scarce, with many qualified candidates clamoring for the few available positions.

The economy of Rukungiri relies on trade, industry, agriculture, and human resources. Africa is a resource-rich continent. Recent growth has been due to growth in sales in commodities, services, and manufacturing. Rukungiri District is largely depended on agriculture(subsistence farming). Trade is the main economic activity in Rukungiri town.

== Other points of interest ==
The following points of interest are in Rukungiri District:

- Kisiizi Hospital - A 250-bed private hospital administered by the Church of Uganda
- Karoli Lwanga Hospital, Nyakibale- A 200-bed hospital administered by the Uganda Catholic Church
- Immaculate Heart Girls' School-Nyakibale, one of the top academic giant Schools in the country

== Secondary Schools ==
- St. Charles Lwanga Seminary, Nyakibale
- St. Gerald's S S Nyakibale
- St.Mark S.S Nyakibale
- Mary Seat of Wisdom, Nyakibale
- St. Francis S S Buhunga High School
- St.Jerome Ndama S.S

== Livestocks ==
1. Cattle
2. Goat
3. Sheep
4. Poutry
5. Pigs

== See also ==
1. Kigezi
2. Districts of Uganda
3. Western Region, Uganda
4. Parliament of Uganda
