= Rukungiri =

- Location in Uganda
- Coordinates: 00°47′24″S 29°55′30″E
- Country: Uganda
- Region: Western Region of Uganda
- Sub-region: Kigezi sub-region
- District: Rukungiri District
- Elevation: 5,380 ft (1,640 m)

Population (2024 Census)
  - Total: 43,529

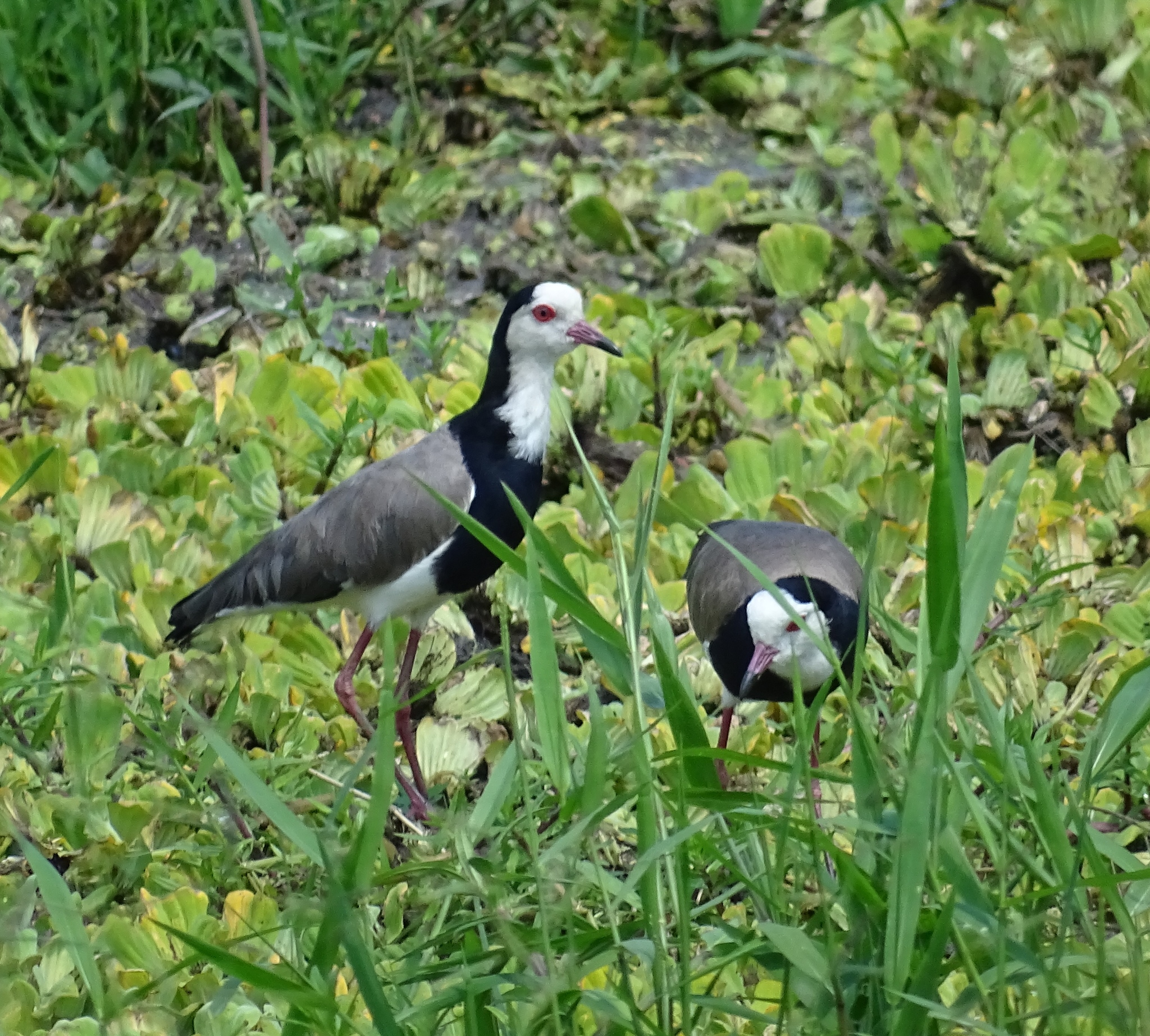
Long-toed Lapwing, Rukungiri, Uganda

Rukungiri is a town in Rukungiri District of the Western Region of Uganda. It is the site of the district headquarters.

== Geography ==
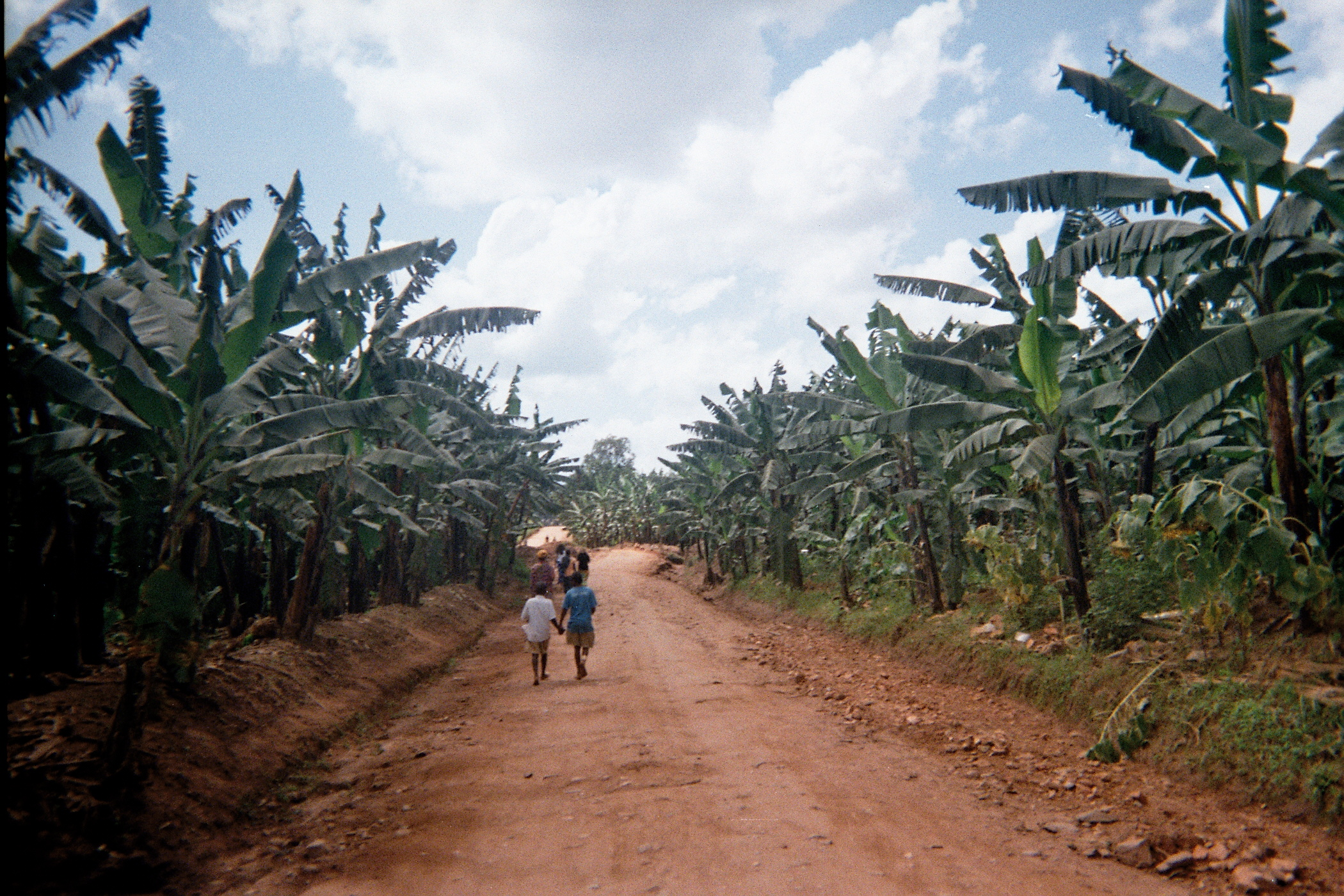
Road in Kisizi or Kisiizi, a community in the Rukungiri District of Uganda.

Rukungiri is approximately 80 kilometres (50 mi) north of Kabale City, the largest city in the Kigezi sub-region. It is about 115 kilometres (71 mi), southwest of Mbarara, the largest city in the Western Region of Uganda.

Rukungiri is approximately 381 kilometres (237 mi), by road, southwest of Kampala, the capital and largest city of Uganda. The coordinates of the town are 0°47'24.0"S, 29°55'30.0"E (Latitude:-0.7900; Longitude:29.9250).

== Overview ==
Rukungiri is a two-street town surrounded by numerous hills and valleys. Most of the surrounding hills, however, have lost their natural shape because of human activity, most notably agriculture. The town itself is located on a hilltop. In some places, the agricultural terraces on the hills cover them from the foot to peak.

== Population ==
According to the 2002 national census, Rukungiri had 12,765 inhabitants. In 2010, the Uganda Bureau of Statistics (UBOS) estimated the population at 14,400. In 2011, UBOS estimated the mid-year population at 14,700. In 2014, the national population census put the population at 36,509. In 2020, UBOS estimated the mid-year population of the town at 37,200 people.

Historical population
Year	Pop.	±%
2002	12,765	—
2010	14,400	+12.8%
2011	14,700	+2.1%
2014	36,509	+148.4%
2020	37,200	+1.9%

== Points of interest ==
The following additional points of interest are located in or close to the town limits:

1. The offices of Rukungiri Town Council

2. The offices of Rukungiri District Administration

3. Rukungiri central market

4. Rukungiri Stadium

5. The 51 kilometres (32 mi) Ntungamo–Rukungiri Road ends here.

== See also ==
- Districts of Uganda
- List of cities and towns in Uganda
