= Yoweri Museveni =

President of Uganda since 1986

His Excellency Yoweri Museveni CGH
- Museveni in 2012

9th President of Uganda
- Incumbent
- Assumed office 29 January 1986 (Note: Acting: 26–29 January 1986)
- Prime Minister: See list: Samson Kisekka (1986–1991) George Cosmas Adyebo (1991–1994) Kintu Musoke (1994–1999) Apollo Nsibambi (1999–2011) Amama Mbabazi (2011–2014) Ruhakana Rugunda (2014–2021) Robinah Nabbanja (2021–present)
- Vice President: See list: Vacant (1986–1991) Samson Kisekka (1991–1994) Specioza Kazibwe (1994–2003) Gilbert Bukenya (2003–2011) Edward Ssekandi (2011–2021) Jessica Alupo (2021–present)
- Preceded by: Tito Okello

Secretary General of the Non-Aligned Movement
- Incumbent
- Assumed office 16 January 2024
- Preceded by: Ilham Aliyev

Personal details
- Born: Yoweri Kaguta Museveni Tibuhaburwa; 15 September 1944 (age 82) Ntungamo, Protectorate of Uganda
- Party: NRM
- Other political affiliations: UPM (1980–1986)
- Spouse: Janet Kataaha (m. 1973)
- Children: 4, including Muhoozi and Natasha
- Education: University of Dar es Salaam (BA)
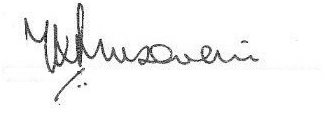
- Signature
- Website: Official website

Military service
- Allegiance: Uganda
- Branch/service: Front for National Salvation; Popular Resistance Army; National Resistance Army
- Years of service: 1971–1986
- Rank: General
- Battles/wars: 1972 invasion of Uganda; Uganda–Tanzania War; Ugandan Bush War

Yoweri Kaguta Museveni Tibuhaburwa (Note: /joʊˈwɛri muːˈsɛvəni, ˌmʊsəˈveɪni/ yoh-WERR-ee moo-SEV-ən-ee, MUU-sə-VAY-nee;) (born 15 September 1944) is a Ugandan politician and former rebel leader who has served as the president of the republic of Uganda since 1986. Museveni has long been widely considered to be a dictator, with political parties being effectively banned from 1986 to 2005, and the use of political repression, lawfare and ballot stuffings to maintain power since the 2005 Ugandan multi-party referendum. (Note: Multiple sources:) As of 2026, after ruling Uganda for more than 40 years, he is currently the third longest-serving non-royal leader in the world behind dictators Paul Biya and Teodoro Obiang Nguema Mbasogo.

Born in Ntungamo, Uganda (then under British control), Museveni studied political science from the University of Dar es Salaam where he initiated the University Students' African Revolutionary Front. In 1972, he joined the failed invasion of Uganda against Idi Amin's dictatorship.The next year, Museveni established the Front for National Salvation and fought alongside Tanzanian forces in the Tanzania–Uganda War, which overthrew Amin. Museveni contested the subsequent 1980 general election on the platform of Uganda Patriotic Movement, though claimed electoral fraud after losing to the unpopular Milton Obote. Museveni unified the opposition under the National Resistance Army and started the Ugandan Bush War. On 30 January 1986, after the decisive Battle of Kampala, Museveni was sworn as president.

As president, Museveni suppressed the Ugandan insurgency and oversaw involvement in the Rwandan Civil War and the First Congo War. He ordered an intervention against the Lord's Resistance Army in an effort to halt their insurgency. His rule has been described by scholars as competitive authoritarianism, or illiberal democracy. The press has been under the authority of government. His presidency has been characterized by relative economic success and, in its later period, efforts to further repress LGBTQ people, alongside numerous constitutional amendments, like the scrapping of presidential term limits in 2005 and age limits in 2017.

On 14 January 2021, Museveni was re-elected to a sixth term with 58.6% of the vote, despite many videos and reports showing ballot box stuffing, over 400 polling stations with 100% voter turnout and human rights violations. In response to protests during the 2026 Ugandan general election, Museveni has reportedly deployed the military, sent special military forces to jail opposition leader Bobi Wine, and deployed "snatch squads" to kidnap protesters. Amid increasing allegations of voter repression, Museveni was declared the victor of the 2026 Ugandan general election after receiving 71% of the vote over opposition candidate Bobi Wine.

== Early life ==
Yoweri Museveni was born on 15 September 1944 to parents Mzee Amos Kaguta (1916–2013), a cattle keeper, and Esteri Kokundeka Nganzi (1918–2001), in Ntungamo. He is an ethnic Hima of the kingdom of Mpororo (now part of Ankole). According to Julius Nyerere, Museveni's father, Amos Kaguta, was a soldier in the King's African Rifles' 7th battalion during World War II. When Yoweri was born, relatives used to say, "His father was a mu-seven" (meaning "one of the seventh"). This is how he obtained the name Museveni.

== Educational background ==
Museveni started his education in 1953 at Kyamate Boys School, then joined Mbarara High School in 1959. After his family's migration from Ntungamo in 1960s, then within the British Protectorate of Uganda, he was admitted to Ntare School in 1961. He applied to Makerere University (then Makerere College) but got rejected on grounds of failing to meet the proof of citizenship requirements. Then President Apollo Milton Obote pleaded Museveni's case for him, but the university still declined to admit Museveni. The president then used his influence in Tanzania to recommend Museveni's admission to the University of Dar es Salaam. Museveni studied economics and political science there. Studying under Walter Rodney, among others, Museveni wrote a university thesis on the applicability of Frantz Fanon's ideas on revolutionary violence to post-colonial Africa. He joined Uganda's intelligence service under President Apollo Milton Obote in 1970.

== Early leadership role ==
While at university, he formed the University Students' African Revolutionary Front student activist group and led a student delegation to FRELIMO standing for Frente de Libertação Moçambique which translates in English as Mozambique Liberation Front-held territory in Portuguese Mozambique where they received military training.

== Career ==
=== 1971–1979: Front for National Salvation and the toppling of Amin ===
Museveni eventually began to gather a group of left-leaning intellectuals who were ready to engage in militant operations against the Ugandan government of Milton Obote. When Obote was overthrown by Idi Amin during the 1971 Ugandan coup d'état, however, Museveni's group allied with Obote's exiled loyalists to oppose Amin. Based in Tanzania, Museveni's group repeatedly entered Uganda to gather intelligence and carry out sabotage missions. In August 1971, Museveni's force unsuccessfully attempted to set up a guerrilla base on Mount Elgon.

The coalition of exile forces opposed to Amin invaded Uganda from Tanzania in September 1972 and were repelled. Museveni's group suffered heavy losses during this failed operation. In October, Tanzania and Uganda signed the Mogadishu Agreement that denied the rebels the use of Tanzanian soil for aggression against Uganda. Museveni broke away from the mainstream opposition and formed the Front for National Salvation (FRONASA) in 1973. In August of the same year, he married Janet Kainembabazi.

In October 1978, Ugandan troops invaded the Kagera Salient in northern Tanzania, initiating the Uganda–Tanzania War. Tanzanian President Julius Nyerere ordered the Tanzania People's Defence Force (TPDF) to counter-attack and mobilized Ugandan dissidents to fight Amin's regime. Museveni was pleased by this development. In December 1978 Nyerere attached Museveni and his forces to Tanzanian troops under Brigadier Silas Mayunga. Museveni and his FRONASA troops subsequently accompanied the Tanzanians during the counter-invasion of Uganda. He was present during the capture and destruction of Mbarara in February 1979, and involved in the Western Uganda campaign of 1979.

In course of these operations, he alternatively spent time at the frontlines and in Tanzania. While in Tanzania, he discussed the cooperation of various anti-Amin rebel groups as well as the political future of Uganda with Tanzanian politicians and other Ugandan opposition figures such as Obote. He played a significant part in the Moshi Conference which led to the unification of the opposition as the Uganda National Liberation Front (UNLF). Yusuf Lule was appointed as UNLF chairman and the potential president of Uganda after Amin's overthrow. Museveni felt dissatisfied with the results of the conference, believing that he and his followers were not granted enough representation.

=== 1980–1986: Ugandan Bush War ===
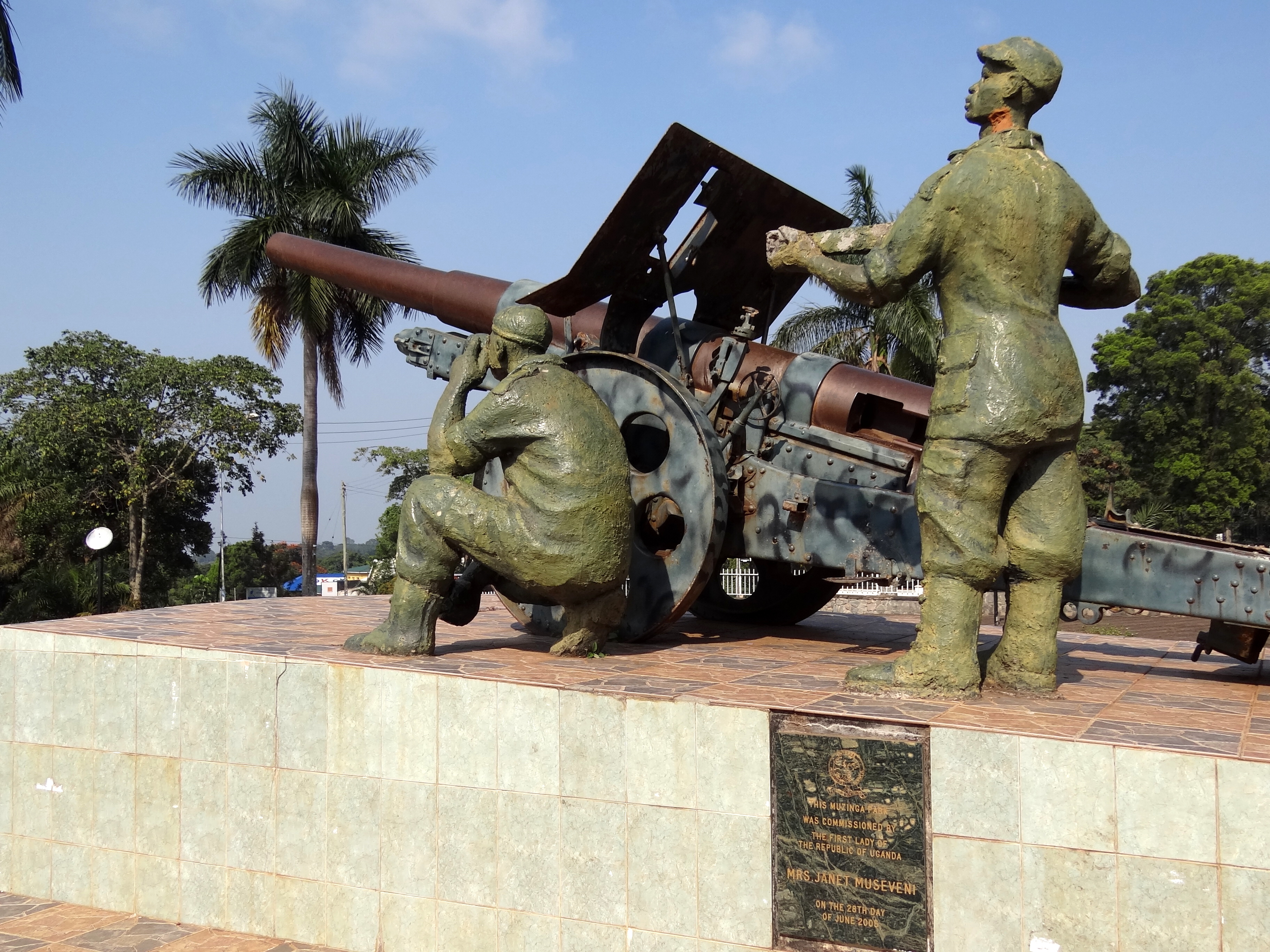
Military monument in Entebbe, dedicated by Museveni's wife

==== Obote II and the National Resistance Army ====
With the overthrow of Amin in 1979 and the contested election that returned Milton Obote to power in 1980, Museveni returned to Uganda with his supporters to gather strength in their rural strongholds in the Bantu-dominated south and south-west to form the Popular Resistance Army (PRA). They planned a rebellion against the second Obote regime (Obote II) and its armed forces, the Uganda National Liberation Army (UNLA). The insurgency began with an attack on an army installation in the central Mubende district on 6 February 1981. The PRA later merged with former president Yusufu Lule's fighting group, the Uganda Freedom Fighters, to create the National Resistance Army (NRA) with its political wing, the National Resistance Movement (NRM). Two other rebel groups, the Uganda National Rescue Front (UNRF) and the Former Uganda National Army (FUNA), engaged Obote's forces. The FUNA was formed in the West Nile sub-region from the remnants of Amin's supporters.

From the 15th to 18th June of 1985, a group of NRA/NRM members (nine members) including Museveni met in Unterolberndorf, Austria where they penned a manifesto and developed a "Ten-point Programme" for Uganda's future. The ten points encompassed proposed policies for: democracy; security; consolidation of national unity; defending national independence; building an independent, integrated, and self-sustaining economy; improvement of social services; elimination of corruption and misuse of power; redressing inequality; cooperation with other African countries; and a mixed economy. The Central Intelligence Agency's World Factbook estimates that the Obote regime was responsible for more 100,000 civilian deaths across Uganda.

==== 1985 Nairobi Agreement ====
On 27 July 1985, sub factionalism within the Uganda People's Congress government led to a successful military coup against Obote by his former army commander, Lieutenant-General Tito Okello, an Acholi. Museveni and the NRM/NRA were angry that the revolution for which they had fought for four years had been "hijacked" by the UNLA, which they viewed as having been discredited by gross human rights violations during Obote II.

Despite these reservations, the NRM/NRA eventually agreed to peace talks presided over by a Kenyan delegation headed by President Daniel arap Moi. The talks, which lasted from 26 August to 17 December, were notoriously acrimonious and the resultant ceasefire broke down almost immediately. The final agreement, signed in Nairobi, called for a ceasefire, demilitarization of Kampala, integration of the NRA and government forces, and absorption of the NRA leadership into the Military Council. These conditions were never met.

==== Battle of Kampala ====
While involved in the peace negotiations, Museveni was courting General Mobutu Sésé Seko of Zaire to forestall the involvement of Zairean forces in support of Okello's military junta. On 20 January 1986, several hundred troops loyal to Amin were accompanied into Ugandan territory by the Zairean military. The forces intervened following secret training in Zaire and an appeal from Okello ten days previously. By 22 January, government troops in Kampala had begun to quit their posts in masses as the rebels gained ground from the south and south-west.

== Presidency ==
Museveni was sworn in as president on 29 January 1986. After a ceremony conducted by British-born Chief Justice Peter Allen, he said this was not "a mere change of guard" but "a fundamental change." Speaking to crowds of thousands outside the Ugandan parliament, Museveni promised a return to democracy, stating: "The people of Africa, the people of Uganda, are entitled to a democratic government. It is not a favor from any regime. The sovereign people must be the public, not the government." After becoming President, Museveni imposed the "Movement system", which was a de facto ban on political parties, under this which parties were restricted to the point of not functioning, making Uganda a de jure no-party democracy. In practice, the system acted as a vehicle for Museveni and the National Resistance Movement to maintain an iron grip on the country, turning it into a de facto one-party state. Uganda has remained a de facto one-party state ever since.

=== Rise to power: 1986–1996 ===
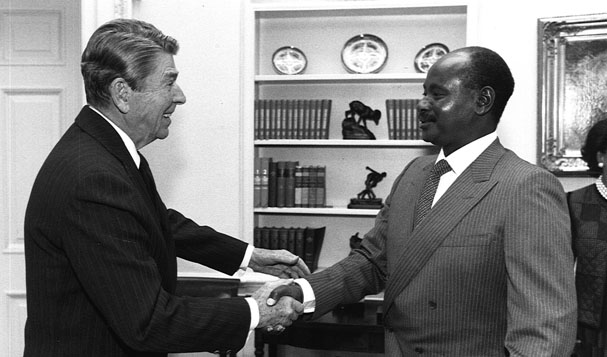
Museveni's meeting with President Ronald Reagan at the White House in October 1987

==== Political and economic regeneration ====
Uganda began participating in an IMF Economic Recovery Program in 1987. Its objectives included the restoration of incentives in order to encourage growth, investment, employment, and exports; the promotion and diversification of trade with particular emphasis on export promotion; the removal of bureaucratic constraints and divestment from ailing public enterprises so as to enhance sustainable economic growth and development through the private sector and the liberalization of trade at all levels.

==== Human rights and internal security ====
The NRM came to power promising to restore security and respect for human rights. This was part of the NRM's ten-point programme, as Museveni noted in his swearing in speech:

The second point on our programme is security of person and property. Every person in Uganda must [have absolute] security to live wherever he wants. Any individual, any group who threatens the security of our people must be smashed without mercy. The people of Uganda should die only from natural causes which are beyond our control, but not from fellow human beings who continue to walk the length and breadth of our land.

Although Museveni headed a new government in Kampala, the NRM could not project its influence fully across Ugandan territory, finding itself fighting a number of insurgencies. From the beginning of Museveni's presidency, he drew strong support from the Bantu-speaking south and southwest, where Museveni had his base. Museveni managed to get the Karamojong, a group of semi-nomads in the sparsely populated northeast that had never had a significant political voice, to align with him by offering them a stake in the new government. The northern region along the Sudanese border proved more troublesome. In the West Nile sub-region, inhabited by Kakwa and Lugbara (who had previously supported Amin), the UNRF and FUNA rebel groups fought for years until a combination of military offensives and diplomacy pacified the region.

The leader of the UNRF, Moses Ali, gave up his struggle to become the second deputy prime minister. People from the northern parts of the country viewed the rise of a government led by a person from the south with great trepidation. Rebel groups sprang up among the Lango, Acholi, and Teso peoples, though they were overwhelmed by the strength of the NRA except in the far north where the Sudanese border provided a safe haven. The Acholi rebel Uganda People's Democratic Army (UPDA) failed to dislodge the NRA occupation of Acholiland, leading to the desperate chiliasm of the Holy Spirit Movement (HSM). The defeat of both the UPDA and HSM left the rebellion to a group that eventually became known as the Lord's Resistance Army, which turned upon the Acholi themselves.

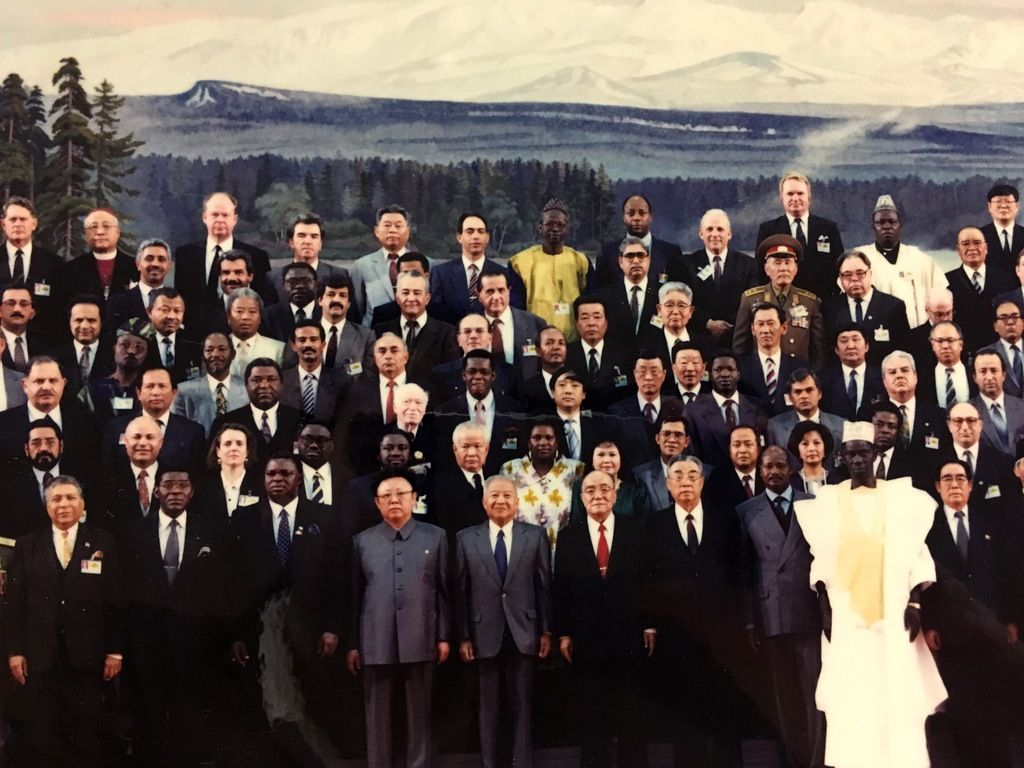
Museveni (first row, third from right) at Kim Il Sung's 80th birthday celebration in 1992

The NRA subsequently earned a reputation for respecting the rights of civilians, although Museveni later received criticism for using child soldiers. Undisciplined elements within the NRA soon tarnished a hard-won reputation for fairness. "When Museveni's men first came they acted very well—we welcomed them", said one villager, "but then they started to arrest people and kill them".

In March 1989, Amnesty International published a human rights report on Uganda, Uganda, the Human Rights Record 1986–1989. It documented gross human rights violations committed by NRA troops. According to Olara Otunnu, a United Nations Diplomat argued that Museveni pursued a genocide to Nilotic – Luo people living in the Northern part of the country. In one of the most intense phases of the war, between October and December 1988, the NRA forcibly cleared approximately 100,000 people from their homes in and around Gulu town. Soldiers committed hundreds of extrajudicial executions as they forcibly moved people, burning down homes and granaries. In its conclusion, the report offered some hope:

Any assessment of the NRM government's human rights performance is, perhaps inevitably, less favourable after four years in power than it was in the early months. However, it is not true to say, as some critics and outside observers, that there has been a continuous slide back towards gross human rights abuse, that in some sense Uganda is fated to suffer at the hands of bad government.

On 13 September 2019, Museveni's former Inspector General of Police (IGP) General Kale Kayihura was placed on the United States Department of the Treasury sanctions list for gross violation of Human rights during his reign as the IGP (from 2005 to March 2018). This was due to activities of the Uganda Police's Flying Squad Unit that involved torture and corruption. Kayihura was subsequently replaced with Martin Okoth Ochola.

=== First elected term (1996–2001) ===
==== Elections ====
The first elections under Museveni's government were held on 9 May 1996. Museveni defeated Paul Ssemogerere of the Democratic Party, who contested the election as a candidate for the "Inter-party forces coalition", and the upstart candidate Kibirige Mayanja. Museveni won with 74.3 percent of the vote from a turnout of 72.9 percent of eligible voters. There were 15,615 polling stations by then with 8,492,231 registered voters out of which only 6,193,816 voters voted with 5,997,626 valid votes and 196,190 invalid votes representing 3.2%.15,615 polling stations sent their results of votes. Although international and domestic observers described the vote as valid, both the losing candidates rejected the results. Museveni was sworn in as president for the second time on 12 May 1996. In 1997, he introduced free primary education.

The table below shows in sight of the 1996 election for presidency.
Name of the candidates	Number of votes cast	Percentage votes
Kaguta Museveni Yoweri	4,458,195	74.3
Ssemogerere Paul Kawanga	1,416,140	23.6
Mayanja Muhammad Kibirige	123,291	2.1

The election culminated in a petition filed by Besigye at the Supreme Court of Uganda. The court ruled that the elections were not free and fair but declined to nullify the outcome by a 3–2 majority decision. The court held that although there were many cases of election malpractice, they did not affect the result in a substantial manner. Chief Justice Benjamin Odoki and Justices Alfred Karokora and Joseph Mulenga ruled in favor of the respondents while Justices Aurthur Haggai Oder and John Tsekoko ruled in favor of Besigye.

=== Second term (2001–2006) ===
==== 2001 elections ====
In 2001, Museveni won the presidential elections by a substantial majority, with his former friend and personal physician Kizza Besigye as the only real challenger. Museveni had 5,088,470 votes, which stood at 69.4%, followed by his counterpart Besigye, who got 2,029,190 votes standing at 27.7%. The total number of voters who registered were 10,775,836 out of which only 7,511,606 voted with total vaild votes of 7,327,079 and invalid votes of 184,527. The leading district in voting was Kamwenge in which 111,146 voters voted and 110,188 voters were valid standing at 92.1%. In a populist publicity stunt, Museveni travelled on a bodaboda motorcycle taxi to submit his nomination form for the election.

There was recrimination and bitterness during the 2001 presidential elections campaign, and incidents of violence occurred following the announcement of the win by Museveni. Besigye challenged the election results in the Supreme Court of Uganda. Two of the five judges concluded that there were such illegalities in the elections and that the results should be rejected. The other three decided that the illegalities did not affect the result of the election in a substantial manner, but stated that "there was evidence that in a significant number of polling stations there was cheating" and that in some areas of the country, "the principle of free and fair election was compromised."

The table below shows how each candidate was voted.
Name of candidates	Numbers of voters who voted	Percentage of voting
Museveni Kaguta	5,088,470	69.4
Besigye Kizza	2,029,190	27.7
Awori Aggrey	103,653	1.4
Mayanja Kibirige	73,045	1.0
Bwengye Francis	22,666	0.3
Chaapa K	10,055	0.1

Besigye had been a close confidant of the president and was his physician during the Ugandan Bush War. They had a terrible fallout shortly before the 2001 elections, when Besigye decided to stand for the presidency. The 2001 election campaigns were a heated affair, with Museveni threatening to put his rival "six feet under".

==== Political pluralism and constitutional change ====
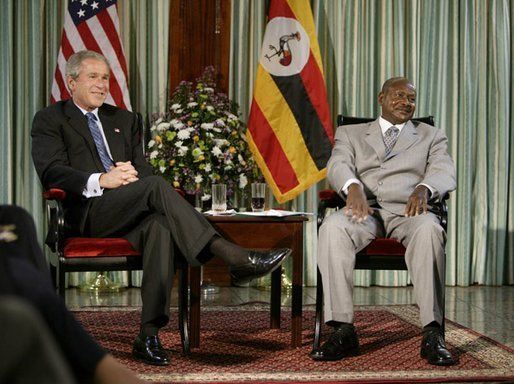
Museveni and US President George W. Bush in June 2003

After the elections, political forces allied to Museveni began a campaign to loosen constitutional limits on the presidential term, allowing him to stand for election again in 2006. The 1995 Ugandan constitution provided for a two-term limit on the tenure of the president.

Moves to alter the constitution and alleged attempts to suppress opposition political forces have attracted criticism from domestic commentators, the international community, and Uganda's aid donors. In a press release, the main opposition party, the Forum for Democratic Change (FDC), accused Museveni of engaging in a "life presidency project", and for bribing members of parliament to vote against constitutional amendments, FDC leaders claimed:

The country is polarized with many Ugandans objecting to [the constitutional amendments]. If Parliament goes ahead and removes term limits, this may cause serious unrest, political strife and may lead to turmoil both through the transition period and thereafter ... We would therefore like to appeal to President Museveni to respect himself, the people who elected him, and the Constitution under which he was voted President in 2001 when he promised the country and the world at large to hand over power peacefully and in an orderly manner at the end of his second and last term. Otherwise, his insistence to stand again will expose him as a consummate liar and the biggest political fraudster this country has ever known.

As observed by some political commentators, including Wafula Oguttu, Museveni had previously stated that he considered the idea of clinging to office for "15 or more" years ill-advised. Comments by the Irish anti-poverty campaigner Bob Geldof sparked a protest by Museveni supporters outside the British High Commission in Kampala. "Get a grip Museveni. Your time is up, go away", said Geldof in March 2005, explaining that moves to change the constitution were compromising Museveni's record against fighting poverty and HIV/AIDS.

In an opinion article in the Boston Globe and in a speech delivered at the Wilson Center, former US Ambassador to Uganda Johnnie Carson heaped more criticism on Museveni. Despite recognizing the president as a "genuine reformer" whose "leadership [has] led to stability and growth", Carson also said, "we may be looking at another Mugabe and Zimbabwe in the making". "Many observers see Museveni's efforts to amend the constitution as a re-run of a common problem that afflicts many African leaders – an unwillingness to follow constitutional norms and give up power".

In July 2005, Norway became the third European country in as many months to announce symbolic cutbacks in foreign aid to Uganda in response to political leadership in the country. The UK and Ireland made similar moves in May. "Our foreign ministry wanted to highlight two issues: the changing of the constitution to lift term limits, and problems with opening the political space, human rights and corruption", said Norwegian Ambassador Tore Gjos. Of particular significance was the arrest of two opposition MPs from the FDC. Human rights campaigners charged that the arrests were politically motivated. Human Rights Watch stated that "the arrest of these opposition Members of Parliament smacks of political opportunism".

A confidential World Bank report leaked in May suggested that the international lender might cut its support to non-humanitarian programmes in Uganda. "We regret that we cannot be more positive about the present political situation in Uganda, especially given the country's admirable record through the late 1990s", said the paper. "The Government has largely failed to integrate the country's diverse peoples into a single political process that is viable over the long term... Perhaps most significant, the political trend-lines, as a result of the President's apparent determination to press for a third term, point downward."

Museveni responded to the mounting international pressure by accusing donors of interfering with domestic politics and using aid to manipulate poor countries. "Let the partners give advice and leave it to the country to decide ... [developed] countries must get out of the habit of trying to use aid to dictate the management of our countries." "The problem with those people is not the third term or fighting corruption or multiparters", added Museveni at a meeting with other African leaders, "the problem is that they want to keep us there without growing".

In July 2005, a constitutional referendum, which was won by pro-democracy forces lifted a 19-year de-facto ban on political parties. Before the vote, the FDC spokesperson stated, "Key sectors of the economy are headed by people from the president's home area... We have got the most sectarian regime in the history of the country in spite of the fact that there are no parties."

Many Ugandans saw Museveni's conversion to political pluralism as a concession to donors – aimed at softening the blow when he announces he wants to stay on for a third term. Opposition MP Omara Atubo has said Museveni's desire for change was merely "a façade behind which he is trying to hide ambitions to rule for life".

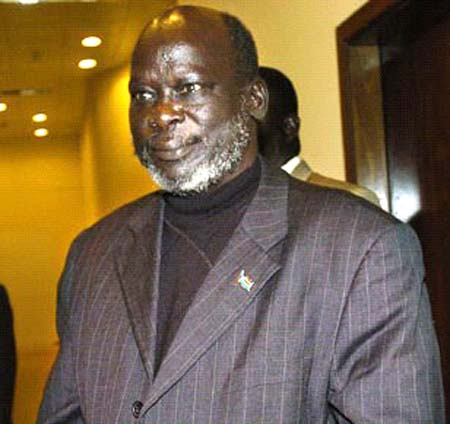
Dr John Garang De Mabior

In September 2004, Museveni delivered the keynote address at the Ugandan North American Association (UNAA) convention in Seattle, Washington, accompanied by First Lady Janet Museveni and U.S. Congressman Jim McDermott.

==== Death of John Garang ====
On 30 July 2005, Sudanese vice-president John Garang was killed when the Ugandan presidential helicopter crashed while he was flying back to Sudan from talks in Uganda. Garang had been Sudan's vice-president for three weeks before his death. Widespread speculation as to the cause of the crash led Museveni, on 10 August, to threaten the closure of media outlets that published "conspiracy theories" about Garang's death. In a statement, Museveni claimed that the speculation was a threat to national security. "I will no longer tolerate a newspaper which is like a vulture. Any newspaper that plays around with regional security, I will not tolerate it – I will close it." The following day, popular radio station Kampala Frequency Modulation(KFM) had its license withdrawn for broadcasting a debate on Garang's death. Radio presenter Andrew Mwenda was eventually arrested for sedition in connection with comments made on his KFM talk show.

=== February 2006 elections ===
On 17 November 2005, Museveni was chosen as the NRM's presidential candidate for the February 2006 elections. His candidacy for a further third term sparked criticism, as he had promised in 2001 that he was contesting for the last time.The arrest of the main opposition leader Kizza Besigye on 14 November – charged with treason, concealment of treason, and rape – sparked demonstrations and riots in Kampala and other towns. Museveni's bid for a third term, the arrest of Besigye, and the besiegement of the High Court during a hearing of Besigye's case (by a heavily armed Military Intelligence group dubbed by the press as the "Black Mambas Urban Hit Squad"), led Sweden, the Netherlands, and the United Kingdom to withhold economic support to Museveni's government because of their concerns about the country's democratic development. On 2 January 2006, Besigye was released after the High Court ordered his immediate release.

The 23 February 2006 elections were Uganda's first multi-party elections in 25 years and were seen as a test of its democratic credentials. Although Museveni did worse than in the previous election, he was elected for another five-year tenure, having won 59 percent of the vote against Besigye's 37 percent. Besigye alleged fraud and rejected the result. The European Union and independent Ugandan electoral observers described the 2006 elections as not a fair and free contest. The Supreme Court of Uganda later noted that the election was marred by intimidation, violence, voter disenfranchisement and other irregularities; it voted 4–3 to uphold the results.

=== Third term (2006–2011) ===
In 2007, Museveni deployed troops to the African Union's peace-keeping operation in Somalia (AMISOM).Also in this term, Museveni held meetings with investors that included Wisdek, to promote Uganda's call centre and outsourcing industry and create employment to the country.

==== September 2009 riots ====
In September 2009, Museveni refused Kabaka Muwenda Mutebi, the Buganda King, permission to visit some areas of the Buganda Kingdom, particularly the Kayunga district. Riots occurred and over 40 people were killed while others were imprisoned. Furthermore, nine more people were killed during the April 2011 "Walk to Work" demonstrations. According to the Human Rights Watch 2013 World Report on Uganda, the government failed to investigate the killings associated with both of these events.

==== Fundamentalist Christianity ====
In 2009, Microsoft and National Broadcasting Company (MSNBC) and NPR reported on Jeff Sharlet's investigation regarding ties between Museveni and the American fundamentalist Christian organization The Fellowship (also known as "The Family"). Sharlet reports that Douglas Coe, leader of The Fellowship, identified Museveni as the organization's "key man in Africa".

==== LGBT rights ====
Further international scrutiny accompanied the 2009 Ugandan efforts to institute the death penalty for homosexuality, with British, Canadian, French, and American leaders expressing concerns for human rights. British newspaper The Guardian reported that Museveni "appeared to add his backing" to the legislative effort by, among other things, claiming "European homosexuals are recruiting in Africa", and saying gay relationships were against God's will. Museveni and members of NRM continue to use the terms "gay" and "homosexuals" to degrade opponents and in particular members of the National Unity Platform. In 2023, Museveni signed an anti-LGBTQ+ bill and called on other African leaders to reject the "promotion of homosexuality".

=== Fourth term (2011–2016) ===
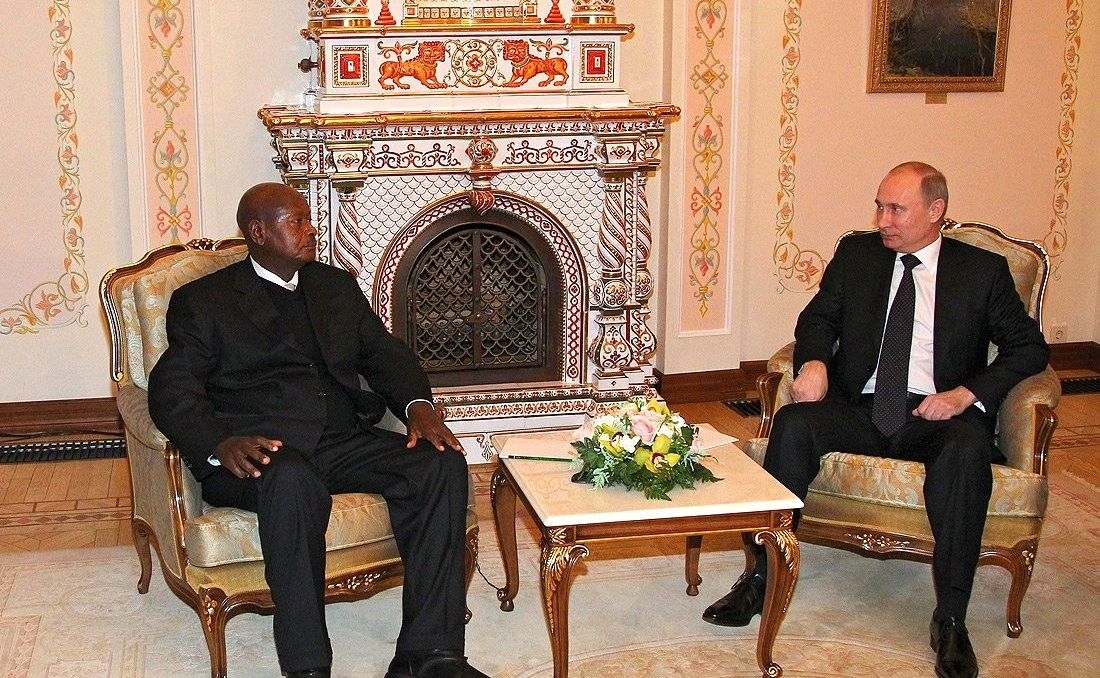
Vladimir Putin and Museveni in 2012

Museveni was reported a winner on Sunday, 20 February 2011 at 4:32:54PM with a 68.38 percent majority with 59.29 percent of registered voters having voted. In this election cycle, the electoral commission registered the first female presidential candidate.

The table below shows the insight results of 2011 election for presidency
Number	Name of candidates	Number of votes cast	Percent
1	Yoweri Museveni Kaguta	5,428,369	68.38
2	Besigye Kifefe Kizza	2,064,963	26.01
3	Mao Nobert	147,917	1.86
4	Olara Otunu	125,059	1.58
5	Betty Olive Kamya Namisango	52,782	0.66
6	Abed Bwanika	51,708	0.65
7	Bidandi Ssali Jaberi	34,688	0.44
8	Samuel Lubega Mukaaku Walter	32,726	0.41

Total number of voters who reigistered were 13,954,129 across a total of 23,968 polling stations of which 23,851 sent the results to the Electoral Commission representing 99.51% of total polling stations. In the results sent, 7,938,212 votes were valid representing 95.96%, 334,548 votes were invalid that is 4.04% giving an overall total of votes cast to be 8,272,760. The election results were disputed by both the European Union and the opposition. "The electoral process was marred with avoidable administrative and logistical failures", according to the European Union election observer team. Following the fall of Egypt's Hosni Mubarak and Libya's Muammar Gaddafi, Museveni became the fifth-longest serving African leader.

In October 2011, the annual inflation rate reached 30.5 percent, principally due to food and fuel increases. Earlier in 2011, opposition leader Kizza Besigye staged "Walk to Work" protests against the high cost of living. On 28 April 2011, Besigye was arrested because Museveni said Besigye had attacked first, a charge he denied. Besigye's arrest led to more riots in Kampala. Besigye promised that "peaceful demonstrations" would continue. The government's response to the riots has been condemned by donor nations.

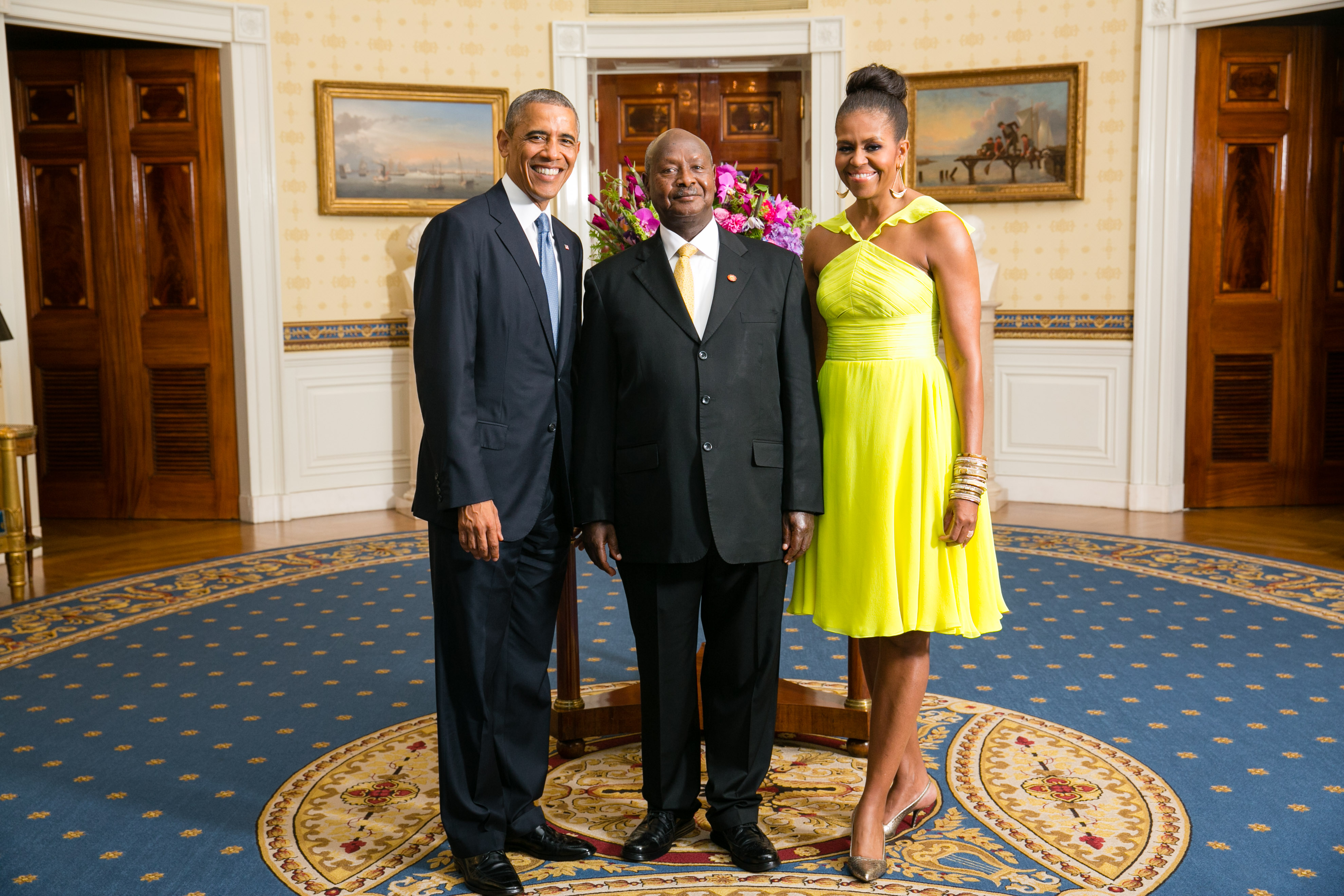
Museveni is greeted by US President Barack Obama in August 2014.

In more recent years, infringements on press freedom have increasingly been a central focus. According to Human Rights Watch, "Between January and June [2013], a media watchdog organization registered 50 attacks on journalists, despite multiple pledges to respect media freedom." During this period, two widely read periodicals, The Daily Monitor and The Red Pepper, were shut down and seized by the government because they published allegations about a "plot to assassinate senior government and military officials who [were] opposed to Ugandan President Yoweri Museveni ... and his plans to hand over power to his son when he retires".

Another issue of human rights became an issue in early 2014 when Museveni signed an anti-homosexuality bill into law. In an interview with CNN, Museveni called homosexuals "disgusting" and said that homosexuality was a learned trait. Western leaders, including United States President Obama, condemned the law.

Museveni has criticized the US's involvement in the Libyan Civil War, and in a UN speech argued that military intervention from African countries produces more stable countries in the long term, which he calls "African solutions for African problems".

=== Fifth term (2016–2021) ===
==== 2016 election ====
The presidential candidates included Museveni and Kizza Besigye, who complained of rigging and violence at polling stations. Voting was extended in several locations after reports of people not being allowed to cast their votes. According to the Electoral Commission, Museveni was reported again another winner on Monday,22 February 2016 with 60.62% percent of the vote followed by Besigye's 35.61 percent. Opposition candidates claimed that the elections were marred by widespread fraud, voting irregularities, the repeated arrest of opposition politicians, and a climate of voter intimidation.

Results of candidates who contested alongside Museveni
Contestant	Number of votes obtained	Percent of votes
Yoweri Kaguta Museveni	5,971,872	60.62
Kizza Besigye Kifefe	3,508,687	35.61
Amama Mbabazi	136,519	1.39
Abed Bwanika	89005	0.90
Baryamreeba Venansius	52,798	0.54
Maureen Faith Kyalya Waluube	42,833	0.43
Benon Buta Biraaro	25,600	0.26
Mabirizi Joseph	24,498	0.25

The registered number of polling stations was 28,010 across the country, with a total of 15,277,198 registered voters, although not everyone voted. Only 10,329,131 voters (representing 69.61% of the total) voted, out of which 9,851,812 votes were valid, indicating 95.38% voting precision.

==== 2018 age limit bill ====
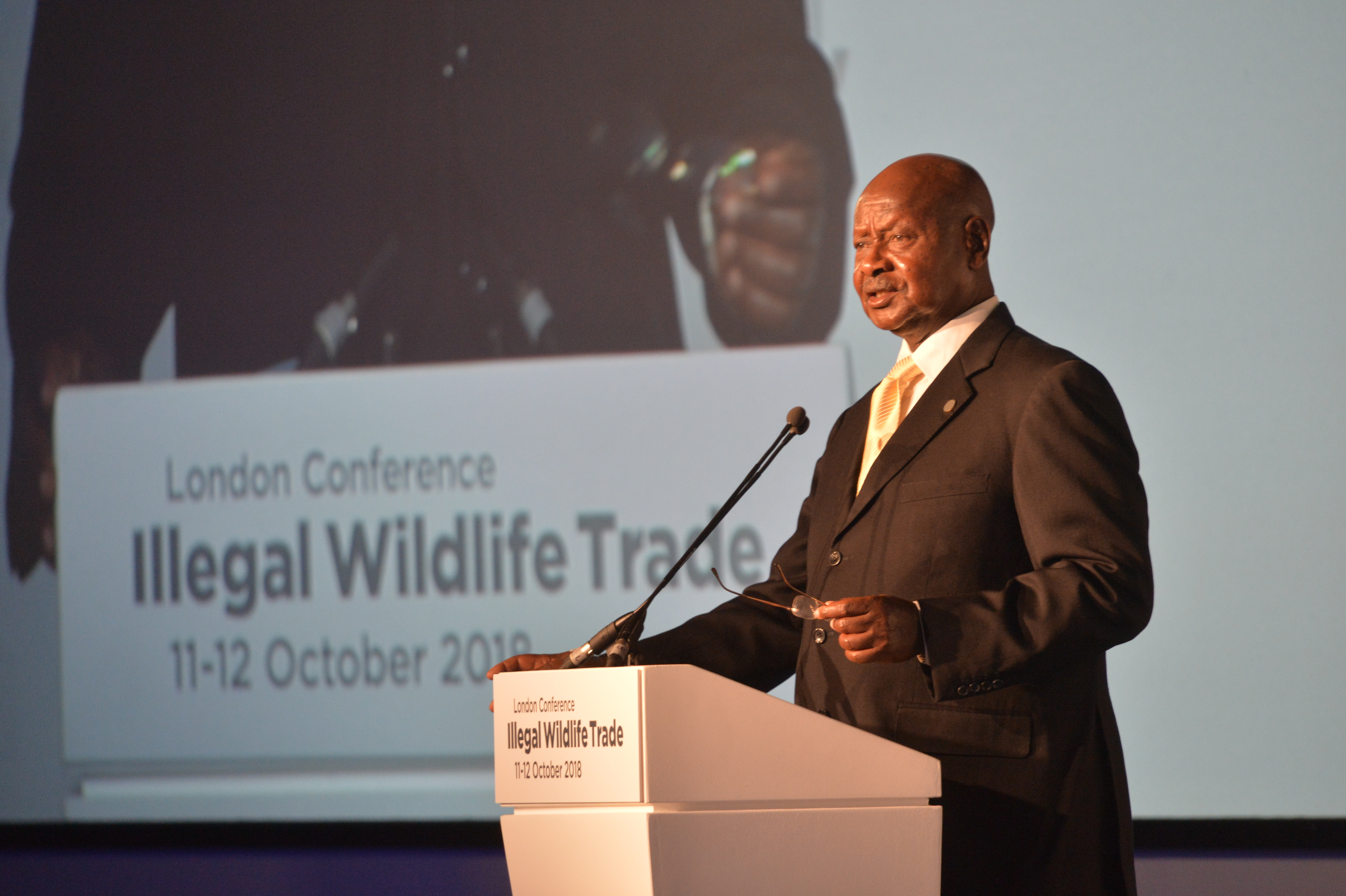
Museveni speaking at the Illegal Wildlife Trade Conference in London, October 2018

Museveni, as the incumbent president of Uganda, signed the Constitutional Amendment Bill No. 2 2017, commonly known as the "Age Limit" bill on 27 December 2017. The bill was passed by the 10th parliament of Uganda on 20 December 2017. As of 27 December 2017, in accordance with articles 259 and 262 of the Constitution of Uganda, the bill has effectively amended the Constitution to remove the presidential age limit caps. Before the amendment, article 102 (b) barred people above 75 and below 35 from running for the highest office. The current age limit bill also extends the term of office of parliament from five years to seven. The bill also restores presidential two-term limits which had been removed in a 2005 constitutional amendment.

==== Challenge to the bill ====
After Museveni signed the 2018 Age Limit Bill into law on 27 December 2017 (but parliament received the letter on 2 January 2018), the general public protested, as they had been doing prior to the signing of the bill, using all avenues including on social media. In October 2017, some MPs returned what they alleged were bribes to facilitate the bill.

The Uganda Law Society and members of the opposition house sued and challenged the bill in court, citing that the process leading to the vote was in violation of Articles 1, 2, 8A, 44 (c), 79 and 94 of the Ugandan constitution because the Speaker of Parliament [Kadaga] closed debate on the Amendment after only 124 out of 451 legislators had debated the bill. They also argued that the use of force by the army and police during the bill debate was inconsistent with and in contravention of Articles 208(2), 209 and 259, among others. The third argument they made was that the bill violated other constitutional clauses in relation to the extension of terms and electoral procedures. One legislator, Mbwaketamwa Gaffa, said, "when the president ascents [sic] to the bill, it might be legal, but it will be illegitimate, and we are going to challenge it."

==== Public reaction to the new bill ====
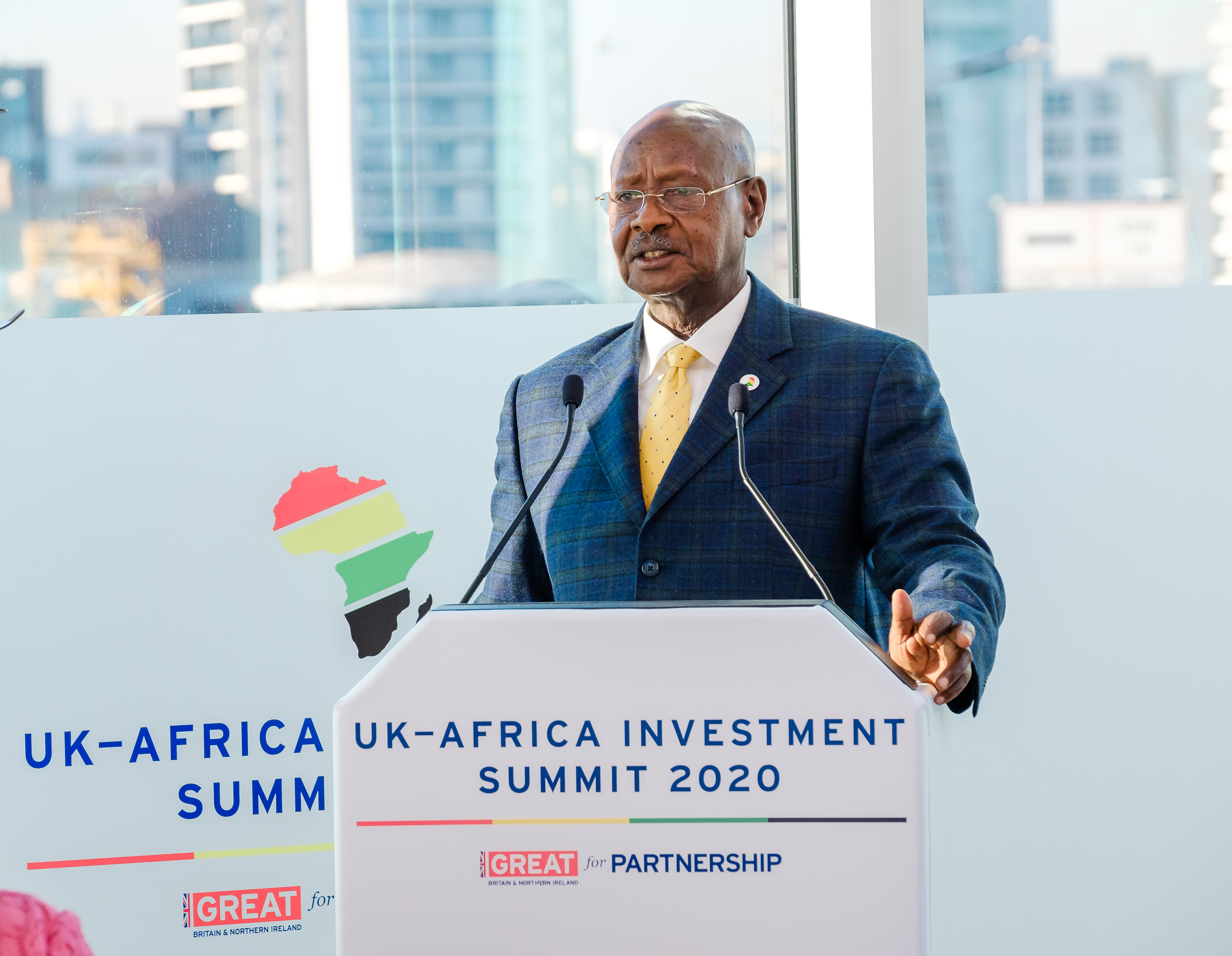
Museveni speaking at the UK–Africa Investment Summit in London, January 2020

The law enforcement agencies in Uganda, such as the police, the military etc., have arrested at least 53 people, including opposition leader Kizza Besigye, for demonstrating against the bill to scrap the presidential age limit.

A three-month survey conducted between September and November by civil society organizations recorded that 85 percent of the sampled population opposed the removal of the age limit, with only 15 percent in support. Ugandan lawmakers have voted predominantly to remove the presidential age limits because they want to pave way for the Museveni to spend a sixth term in office. Human rights lawyer Nicholas Opiyo said that removing the age limit, one of the most important safeguards, will entrench a dictatorial and autocratic regime in Uganda.

=== Sixth term (2021–2026) ===
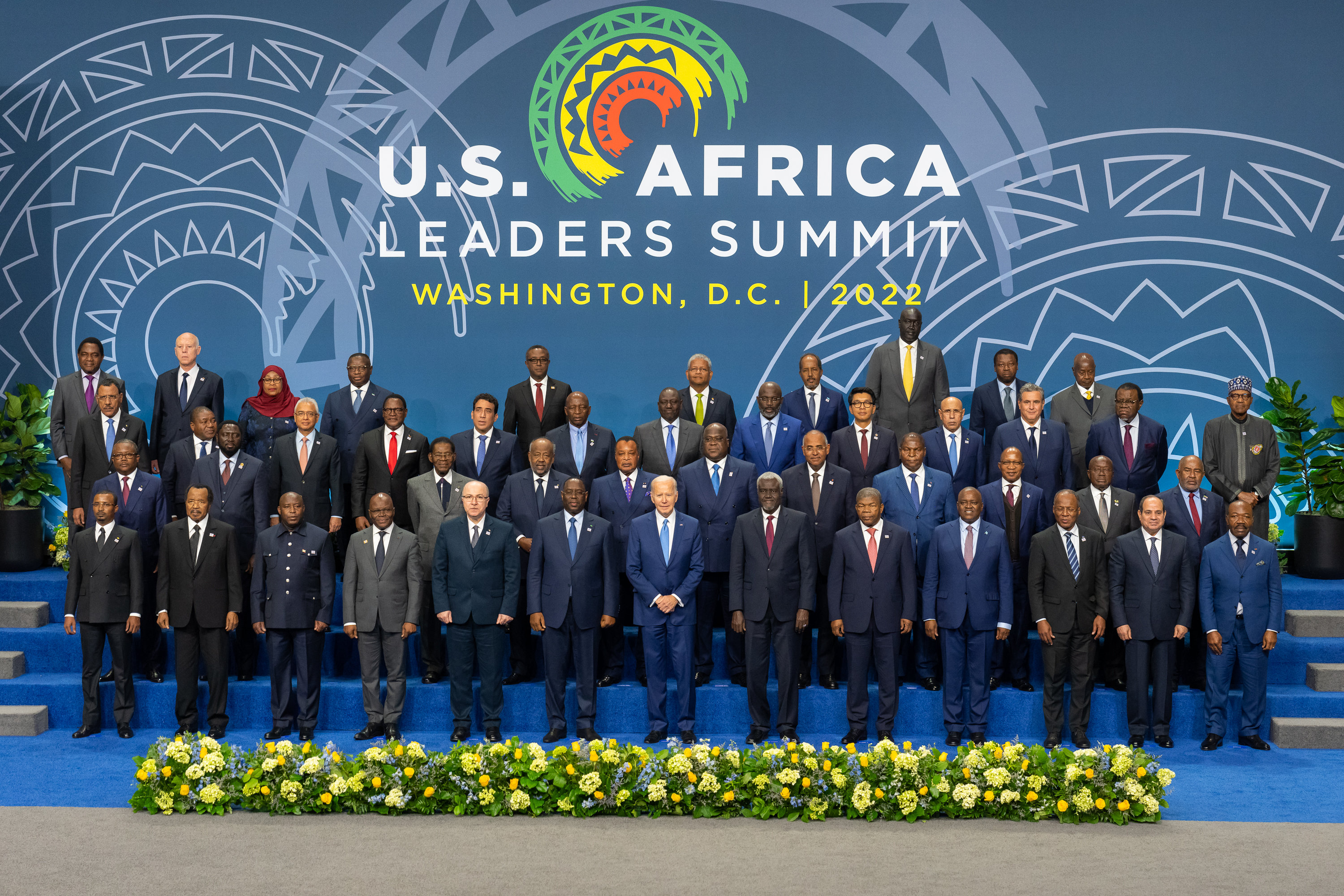
Museveni and US President Joe Biden at the United States–Africa Leaders Summit in Washington, D.C., in December 2022

On 16 January 2021, the Electoral Commission of Uganda announced that Museveni had won reelection to a sixth term on 14 January with 58.6% of the vote. Runner-up Bobi Wine, and other opposition leaders refused to accept the results, claiming that the election was the most fraudulent in Uganda's history. During the campaign for the presidential elections on 19 November 2020, Museveni described Wine's campaign as being financed by foreigners, and, in particular, foreign homosexuals.

Independent organizations and democracy experts confirmed the elections were neither free nor fair. The Electoral Commission published a Declaration of Results form that turned out to be fraudulent. The Electoral Commission then promised an investigation, which did not take place. Wine was placed under house arrest on 15 January. Independent international observers called for investigation into potential election fraud amidst a nationwide internet shutdown, human rights abuses, and denied accreditation requests. Wine was released on 26 January.

In June 2021, 44 people were arrested at an LGBT center, with the pretext of violating Coronavirus Disease Standard Operating Procedures. In July 2022, Museveni hosted Russian Foreign Minister Sergey Lavrov, saying that "We don't believe in being enemies of somebody's enemy."

In October 2022, Museveni apologized to Kenya on behalf of his son, Muhoozi Kainerugaba, who had tweeted that he could invade Kenya in two weeks.

In March 2023, Museveni rejected an earlier version the Anti-Homosexuality Act, 2023, which already included life imprisonment for homosexuality and death penalty for aggravated homosexuality, stating that the bill was not tough enough. He signed a harsher version of the act into law in May 2023 that imposed jail time for children convicted, rehabilitation, as well as duty to report homosexuals.

In July 2023, Museveni attended the 2023 Russia–Africa Summit in Saint Petersburg and met with Russian President Vladimir Putin. Without specifically mentioning the Russian invasion of Ukraine or any other war, Museveni said that the "only justified wars are the just wars, like the anti-colonial wars. Wars of hegemony will fail and waste time and opportunity. Dialogue is the correct way."

After the Hamas attack on Israel in October 2023, Museveni expressed concern over the situation and called for dialogue and a two-state solution to the Israeli–Palestinian conflict. In June 2025, Museveni announced his candidacy for the January 2026 presidential election.

Museveni was formally declared the candidate of his party the following month. On 27 August 2025, the ruling National Resistance Movement endorsed Museveni as presidential candidate for the 2026 election. The party, which was holding its 5th National Conference, also endorsed Museveni as the party chairperson until 2031.

=== Seventh term (2026–present) ===
Initial results released on 16 January showed Museveni leading in the 2026 presidential election with 76.25% of the vote, ahead of Bobi Wine with 19.85%. Wine's supporters protested the results but were unable to prevent Museveni's reelection. On 17 January, Museveni was officially declared the winner with 71.65% of the vote. He was sworn in for his seventh term as president on 12 May.

== Other responsibilities ==
=== International recognition ===
Museveni was elected chairperson of the Organisation of African Unity (OAU) in 1991 and 1992. Perhaps Museveni's most widely noted accomplishment has been his government's successful campaign against HIV/AIDS. During the 1980s, Uganda had one of the highest rates of HIV infection in the world, but now Uganda's rates are comparatively low, and the country stands as a rare success story in the global battle against the virus. One of the campaigns headed by Museveni to fight against HIV/AIDS was the ABC program. The ABC program had three main parts "Abstain, Be faithful, or use Condoms if A and B are not practiced." In April 1998, Uganda became the first country to be declared eligible for debt relief under the Heavily Indebted Poor Countries (HIPC) initiative, receiving US$700 million in aid.

Museveni was lauded by some for his affirmative action program for women in the country. He had a female vice-president, Specioza Kazibwe, for nearly a decade, and has done much to encourage women to go to college. On the other hand, Museveni has resisted calls for greater women's family land rights (the right of women to own a share of their matrimonial homes). The New York Times in 1997 said about Museveni:

These are heady days for the former guerilla who runs Uganda. He moves with the measured gait and sure gestures of a leader secure in his power and his vision. It is little wonder. To hear some of the diplomats and African experts tell it, President Yoweri K. Museveni started an ideological movement that is reshaping much of Africa, spelling the end of the corrupt, strong-man governments that characterized the cold-war era. These days, political pundits across the continent are calling Mr. Museveni an African Bismarck. Some people now refer to him as Africa's "other statesman", second only to the venerated South African President Nelson Mandela.

In official briefing papers from Madeleine Albright's December 1997 Africa tour as Secretary of State, Museveni was claimed by the Clinton administration to be a "beacon of hope" who runs a "uni-party democracy", despite Uganda not permitting multiparty politics. Museveni has been an important ally of the United States in the war on terror.

In December 2000, Museveni opened the 12th annual Ugandan North American Association (UNAA) convention in Kampala, Uganda.

=== Regional conflict ===
Following the Rwandan genocide of 1994, the new Rwandan government felt threatened by the presence across the Rwandan border in the Democratic Republic of the Congo (DRC) of former Rwandan soldiers and members of the previous regime. These soldiers were aided by Mobutu Sese Seko, leading Rwanda (with the aid of Museveni) and Laurent Kabila's rebels during the First Congo War to overthrow Mobutu and take power in the DRC.

In August 1998, Rwanda and Uganda invaded the DRC again during the Second Congo War, this time to overthrow Kabila, who was a former ally of Museveni and Kagame. Museveni and a few close military advisers alone made the decision to send the Uganda People's Defence Force (UPDF) into the DRC. A number of highly placed sources indicate that the Ugandan parliament and civilian advisers were not consulted over the matter, as is required by the 1995 constitution.

Museveni apparently persuaded an initially reluctant High Command to go along with the venture. "We felt that the Rwandese started the war and it was their duty to go ahead and finish the job, but our President took time and convinced us that we had a stake in what is going on in Congo", one senior officer is reported as saying.

The official reasons Uganda gave for the intervention were to stop a "genocide" against the Banyamulenge in the DRC in concern with Rwandan forces, and that Kabila had failed to provide security along the border and was allowing the Allied Democratic Forces (ADF) to attack Uganda from rear bases in the DRC. In reality, the UPDF were deployed deep inside the DRC, more than 1,000 kilometres (620 mi) to the west of Uganda's border with the DRC.

Troops from Rwanda and Uganda plundered the country's rich mineral deposits and timber. The United States responded to the invasion by suspending all military aid to Uganda, a disappointment to the Clinton administration, which had hoped to make Uganda the centerpiece of the African Crisis Response Initiative. In 2000, Rwandan and Ugandan troops exchanged fire on three occasions in the DRC city of Kisangani, leading to tensions and a deterioration in relations between Kagame and Museveni. The Ugandan government has also been criticized for aggravating the Ituri conflict, a sub-conflict of the Second Congo War. The Ugandan army officially withdrew from the Congo in 2003 and a contingent of UN peace keepers was deployed. In December 2005, the International Court of Justice ruled that Uganda must pay compensation to the DRC for human rights violations during the Second Congo War.

== Personal life ==
Museveni does not have a specific place of worship, and attends different cathedrals for security reasons.

He is married to Janet Kataaha Museveni, née Kainembabazi, with whom he has four children:

- Muhoozi Kainerugaba – born in 1974, a general in the Uganda People's Defence Forces (UPDF) who was promoted to the rank of major general in 2016 and later general in 2022
- Natasha Karugire – born in 1976, fashion designer and consultant, married to Edwin Karugire, private secretary to the president of Uganda for household affairs
- Patience Rwabwogo – born in 1978, pastor of Covenant Nations Church Buziga, Kampala, married to Odrek Rwabwogo
- Diana Kamuntu – born in 1980, married to Geoffrey Kamuntu

== Electoral history ==
=== Electoral history of Museveni ===
Year	Office	Party	Votes received				Result
Year	Office	Party	Total	%	P.	Swing	Result
1996	President of Uganda	IND	4,458,195	74.33%	1st	—N/a	Won
2001	President of Uganda	IND	5,123,350	69.33%	1st	−5.00	Won
2006	President of Uganda	NRM	4,109,449	59.26%	1st	−10.07	Won
2011	President of Uganda	NRM	5,428,369	68.38%	1st	+9.12	Won
2016	President of Uganda	NRM	5,971,872	60.62%	1st	−7.76	Won
2021	President of Uganda	NRM	6,042,898	58.38%	1st	−2.24	Won
2026	President of Uganda	NRM	7,946,772	71.65%	1st	+13.27	Won

=== Table of regional voting results for Museveni in 2026 general election ===
Region	Number of votes
Kampala	26,823
Rwenzori	127,234
Teso	467,057
Busoga	414,819
Buganda	682,925
Kigezi	390,069
Karamoja	233,540
Sebei	108,736
Bugisu	209,192
Bukedi	347,903
Toro	365,103
Lango	250,102

== Honours and awards ==
=== National honours ===
- Order of Katonga (6 February 2023)

=== Foreign honours ===
Ribbon	Distinction	Country	Date	Reference
	Order of Playa Girón	Cuba	9 January 1988	
	Grand Cross of the Order of Good Hope	South Africa	November 1997	
	Order of the Republic of Serbia, 2nd Class	Serbia	2016	
	Grand Collar of the Order of Independence	Equatorial Guinea	25 August 2017	
	Grand Cross of the National Order of Merit	Guinea	30 June 2018	
	Member of the Order of South Africa	South Africa	28 February 2023	
	Chief of the Order of the Golden Heart	Kenya		

=== Honorary degrees ===
University	Country	Honour	Year
Humphrey School of Public Affairs	United States	Doctor of Laws	1994
Mbarara University of Science and Technology	Uganda	Doctor of Laws	2003
Latin University of Theology	United States	Doctor of Divinity	2007
Fatih University	Turkey	Honorary degree	2010
Makerere University	Uganda	Doctor of Laws	2010
University of Dar es Salaam	Tanzania	Doctor of Literature	2015

== See also ==
- National Resistance Movement
- Front for National Salvation
- List of current heads of state and government
- List of heads of the executive by approval rating
- Anti-LGBTQ rhetoric
- Politics of Uganda

== Notes ==
Political offices
Preceded by Tito Okello	President of Uganda; 1986–present	Incumbent
Diplomatic posts
Preceded by Lawrence Gonzi	Chairperson of the Commonwealth of Nations; 2007–2009	Succeeded by Patrick Manning
