= Janet Museveni =

First Lady of Uganda since 1986

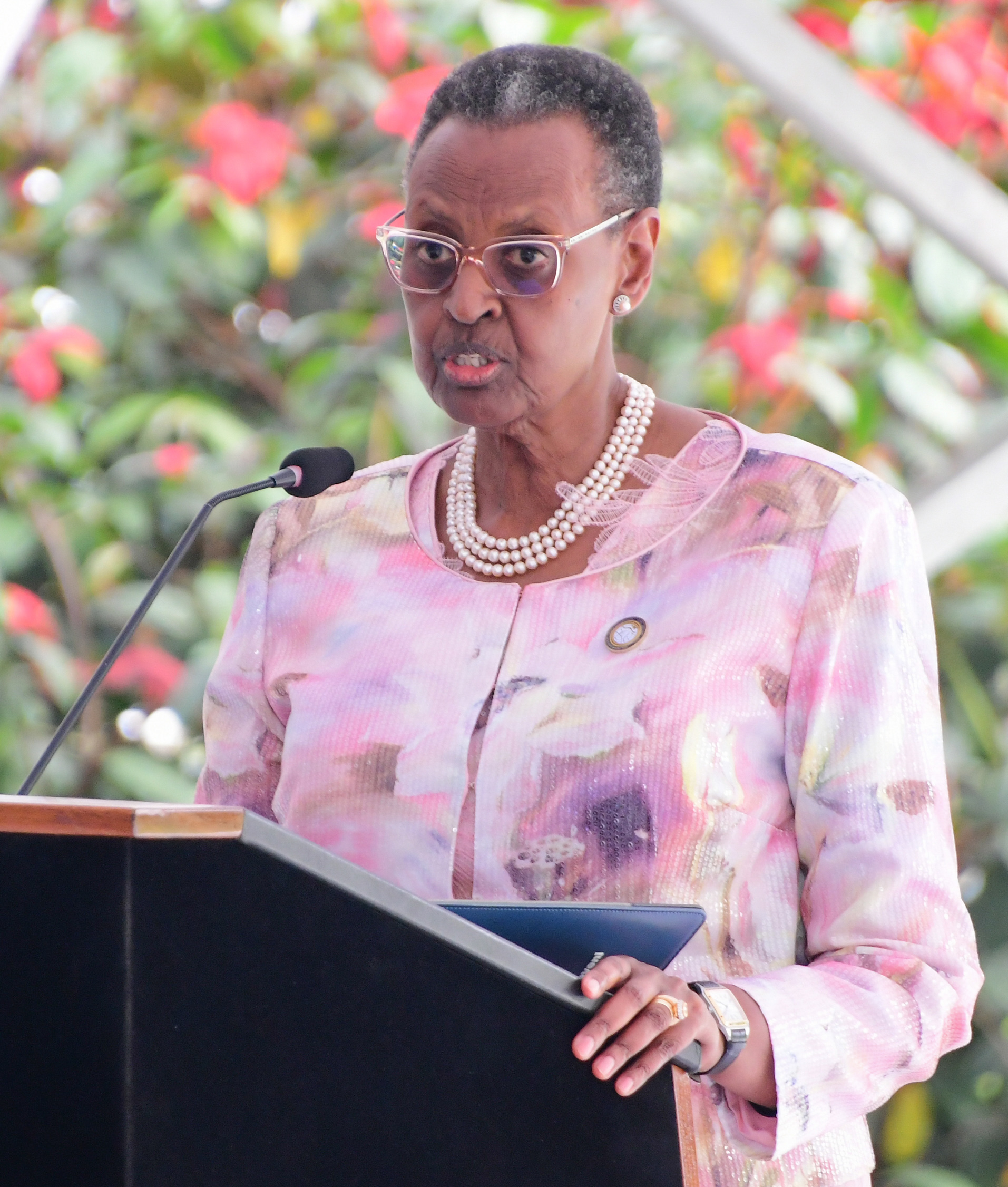
- Janet Museveni in 2024

First Lady of Uganda
- Incumbent
- Assumed role 26 January 1986 (Note: Acting: 26–29 January 1986)
- President: Yoweri Museveni

Minister of Education and Sports
- Incumbent
- Assumed office 6 June 2016
- President: Yoweri Museveni
- Preceded by: Jessica Alupo

Minister for Karamoja Affairs
- In office 27 May 2011 – 6 June 2016
- President: Yoweri Museveni
- Succeeded by: John Byabagambi

Personal details
- Born: Janet Kainembabazi Kataaha; 24 June 1948 (age 78) Kajara County, Ntungamo District, Protectorate of Uganda
- Spouse: Yoweri Museveni (m. 1973)
- Children: Muhoozi Kainerugaba; Natasha Karugire; Patience Rwabwogo; Diana Kamuntu

Janet Kainembabazi Museveni (née Kataaha; born 24 June 1948) is a Ugandan politician and the First Lady of Uganda since 1986. She is married to Yoweri Kaguta Museveni Tibuhaburwa, the incumbent president of Uganda.

She has been Cabinet Minister of Education and Sports since 6 June 2016 in the 11th and 12th Parliaments of Uganda. Although her own education record is questioned, she later graduated at Uganda Christian University, Mukono in Masters Art in organisational Leadership and Management on 30 October 2015. She previously served as Minister for Karamoja Affairs in the Ugandan Cabinet from 27 May 2011 to 6 June 2016.

She also served as the elected Member of Parliament representing Ruhaama County in Ntungamo District, between 2011 and 2016. She published her autobiography, My Life's Journey, in 2011.

== Early life and marriage ==
Janet Kainembabazi Kataaha was born in Kajarra County, Ntungamo District to Mr. Edward Birori and Mrs. Mutesi. She attended Kyamate Primary School, and Bweranyangi Girls' Senior Secondary School in Uganda. She was awarded a Master of Arts in Organisational Leadership and Management on 30 October 2015 from Uganda Christian University.

Janet Museveni went into exile in 1971 because they were plundering Uganda, when Idi Amin Dada toppled the Milton Obote regime in a military coup. She married Yoweri Museveni in August 1973. When Idi Amin's regime fell from power in April 1979, she moved back to Uganda from Tanzania where she had been living in exile with her husband.

In February 1981 when Yoweri Museveni launched his guerrilla war against the government of President Obote, Janet Museveni and her children re-located to Nairobi, Kenya, where they lived with family friends until 1983. In 1983, they moved to Gothenburg, Sweden, and stayed there until May 1986, four months after Museveni's National Resistance Army had seized power in Kampala.

== Career ==
Janet Museveni founded the Uganda Women's Effort to Save Orphans (UWESO), a private relief agency in late 1986, which she said was shaped by her experience as a refugee. She became involved with the HIV/AIDS campaigns in Uganda in the 1990s, forging ties with radical pastor Martin Ssempa for abstinence-only sex education in Uganda. In November 2005, she announced that she would seek the parliamentary seat of Ruhaama county in the February 2006 general elections. She contested the seat against the candidate for the Forum for Democratic Change, Augustine Ruzindana, and won overwhelmingly. She was re-elected in March 2011 to another five-year term.

On 16 February 2009, Janet Museveni was appointed State Minister for Karamoja Affairs, by her husband, President Yoweri Museveni.

In September 2009, she attended the Ugandan North American Association (UNAA) Convention in Chicago, Illinois during her first international trip in that role, focusing on engaging with the Ugandan diaspora.

On 27 May 2011, she was elevated to Minister for Karamoja Affairs, complete with a State Minister for Karamoja Affairs.

On 6 June 2016, after her husband's re-election as President, she was appointed Minister of Education and Sports.

== Personal life ==
She is married to Yoweri Museveni, with whom she has four children:

- Muhoozi Kainerugaba – Born 24 April 1974, General in the UPDF and a Presidential Adviser.
- Natasha Karugire – Born 1976, fashion designer and consultant. Married to Edwin Karugire. Private Secretary to the President of Uganda for Household Affairs.
- Patience Rwabwogo – Born 1978, pastor of Covenant Nations Church, Buziga, Kampala – Married to Odrek Rwabwogo.
- Diana Kamuntu – Born 1980, married to Geoffrey Kamuntu.
- She is a member of the Anglican Church of Uganda.

== Published works ==
- My Life's Journey. Fountain Publishers. 2011. ISBN 978-9970-25-102-5.

== See also ==
- Parliament of Uganda
- Cabinet of Uganda
- Government of Uganda
- Henry Tumukunde
