= Ishasha =

Ishasha may refer to:

- Ishasha, Democratic Republic of the Congo, a town in North Kivu Province, Democratic Republic of the Congo
- Ishasha River Camp Airport, an airport in Ishasha Sector, Queen Elizabeth National Park, Uganda
- Ishasha River, a river that forms the international border between DR Congo and southwest Uganda
- Ishasha Airport (Democratic Republic of the Congo), an airport
- Ishasha, Uganda, a border crossing point and refugee transit station in Kanungu District, Uganda
