= Kwizera Eudia =

Ugandan politician and social worker

- Died: 2017 May 12; Nsambya Hospital in Kampala
- Resting place: Rubugiru Town Council in Kisoro District
- Citizenship: Ugandan
- Education: Certificate and Bachelors' Degree in Counselling
- Occupation: grassroots mobilizer at Compassion International
- Known for: Woman member of Parliament in the eighth Parliament of Uganda for Kisoro District from 2006 to 2011
- Successor: Sarah Mateke Nyirabashitsi
- Political party: National Resistance Movement
- Board member of: African Queens and Women Cultural Leaders Network
- Children: Michael Kwizera

Kwizera Eudia was a Ugandan politician and social worker. A member of the National Resistance Movement (NRM) party, she served in the eighth Parliament of Uganda representing Kisoro District.

== Education ==
She had a Certificate and Bachelors' Degree in Counselling.

== Political career ==
Kwizera was elected as the Woman Representative for Kisoro District in 2006 serving in the eighth Parliament of Uganda. She represented her constituency as a member of the NRM party until 2011. During her tenure in Parliament, she was involved in legislative debate and community advocacy, though specific committee assignments and bills she supported are not comprehensively recorded in public.

In the 2011 Parliamentary elections, Kwisera lost her seat to Sarah Mateke Nyirabashitsi daughter of the then State Minister Philemon Mateke.

== Career life before death ==
She died in 2017 at the age of 60s from Nsambya Hospital in Kampala. Kwizera was said to have died after a short illness. Before her death, she served as the Woman member of Parliament in the eighth Parliament of Uganda for Kisoro District from 2006 to 2011 before Sarah Mateke Nyirabashitsi, the daughter of the State Minister, Philemon Mateke took over as the MP of Kisoro District. Kwizera was buried at her ancestral home in Rubugiru Town Council in Kisoro District.

Before her political career, she was also employed as the grassroots mobilizer at Compassion International. She was a member of executive board at African Queens and Women Cultural Leaders Network. Eudia, had only one son named Michael Kwizera.

During the African MP meeting in Kenya, she encouraged African leaders to ensure the improvement of food production alongside processing and marketing.

== Death and Legacy ==
Kwizera died on 12 May 2017 at Nsambya Hospital in Kampala after a short illness. She was reported to have been in her sixties at the time of her passing. Her death was widely mourned by political colleagues and community members, who remembered her commitment to serving the people of Kisoro and her contributions to public life.

She was buried at her ancestral home in Rubuguri Town Council, Kisoro District. Kwizera is survived by her only son, Michael Kwizera.

== See also ==
- Sarah Mateke Nyirabashitsi
- List of members of the eighth Parliament of Uganda
