= Rubanda District =

- District
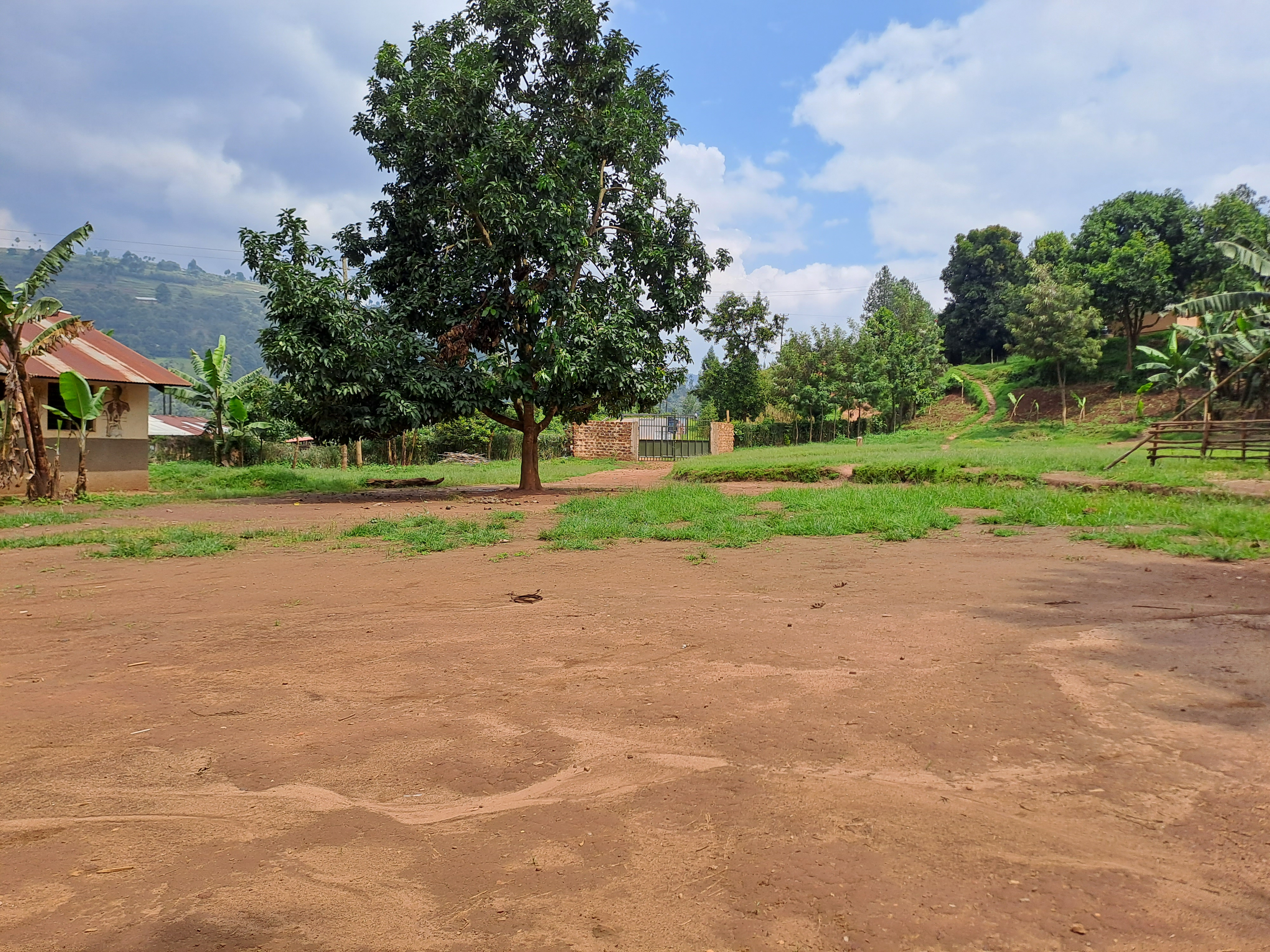
- Interactive map of Rubanda District
- Coordinates: 01°11′S 29°51′E
- Country: Uganda
- Region: Western Region
- Sub-region: Kigezi sub-region
- Capital: Rubanda
- Time zone: UTC+3 (EAT)
- Website: www.rubanda.go.ug

Rubanda District is a district in the Western Region of Uganda. The largest town in the district, Rubanda, serves as the main administrative and commercial center in the district.

== Location ==
Rubanda District is bordered by Kabale District to the east and north, Kanungu District to the north-west, Kisoro District to the west, and Rwanda to the south. The town of Rubanda is approximately 35 kilometres (22 mi), by road, west of Kabale, the largest city in the Kigezi sub-region. This is approximately 173 kilometres (107 mi), by road, south-west of Mbarara, the largest city in the Western Region. Rubanda is about 442 kilometres (275 mi), by road, south-west of Kampala, the capital and largest city of Uganda.

== Overview ==
Rubanda District was established by an Act of Parliament on 3 September 2015 and became operational on 1 July 2016. Before its creation, the district was Rubanda County in neighboring Kabale District. The rationale for its creation was to "bring services closer to the people" and to improve "service delivery" to constituents.

The district had an elevated altitude, with volcanic mountains and hills, separated by V-shaped valleys. Lake Bunyonyi, the second deepest lake in Africa, is found in the district.

== Population ==
The majority of the population are Bakiga, with a smaller number of Batwa. There are still smaller pockets of Bafumbira and Banyarwanda in the district.

== Mineral wealth ==
The district has vast deposits of iron ore in Muko sub-county and surrounding communities. The local blacksmiths called "abahesi", are able to make commercial and domestic tools, including knives, pangas (machetes), hoes and spears. Other minerals found in the districts include wolfram, tungsten, gold and peat.

== Economy ==
1. Bananas
2. Maize
3. Beans
4. Potatoes
5. Tourism(scenic hills, lakes)
6. livestock farming
7. trade and commerce

== Livestock ==
1. Poultry
2. Goat
3. Cattle
4. sheep
5. pigs

== See also ==
1. Kabale–Kisoro–Bunagana Road
2. Western Region, Uganda
3. Parliament of Uganda
