= Rutshuru River =

River in Democratic Republic of the Congo and Uganda

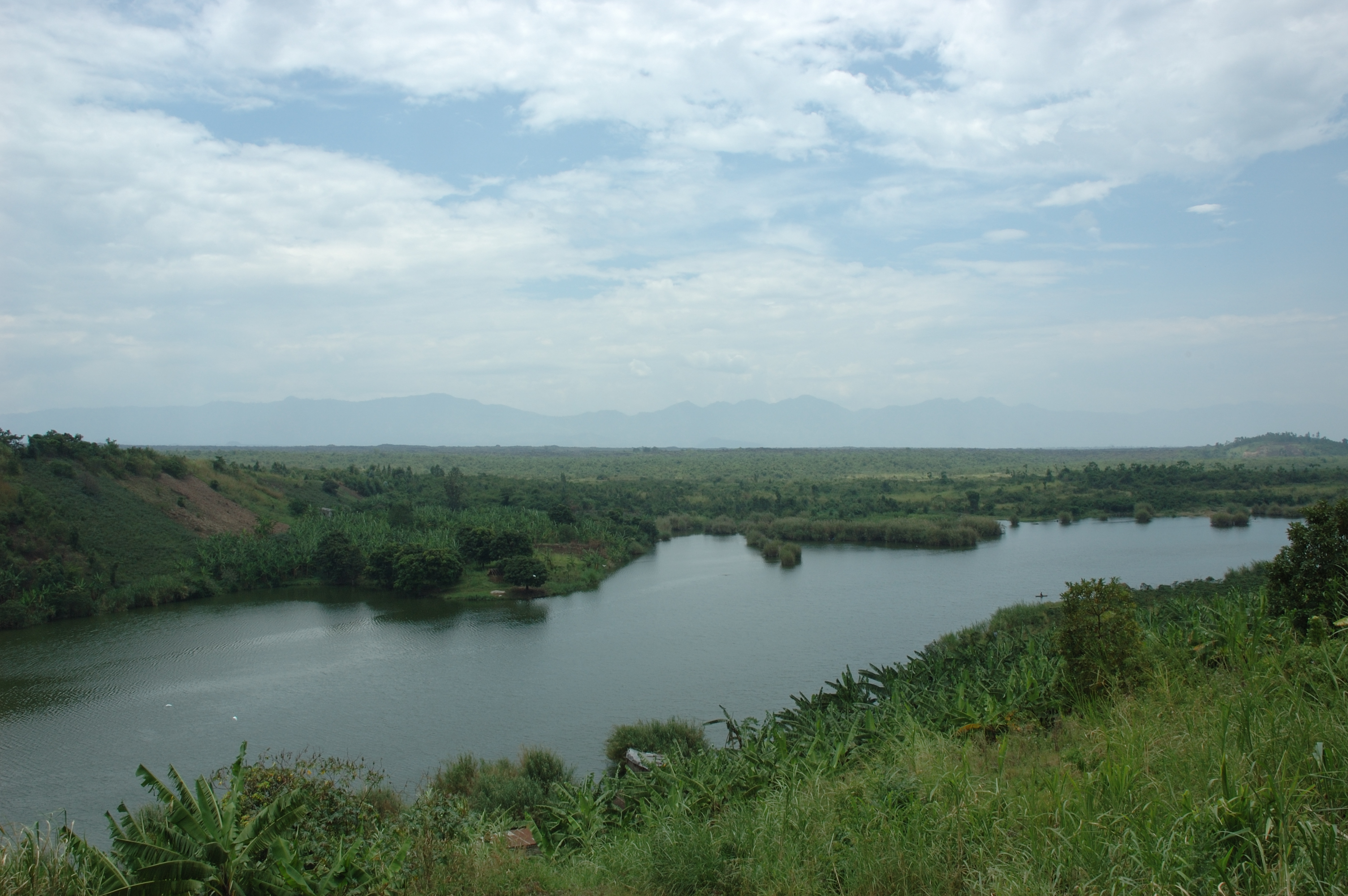

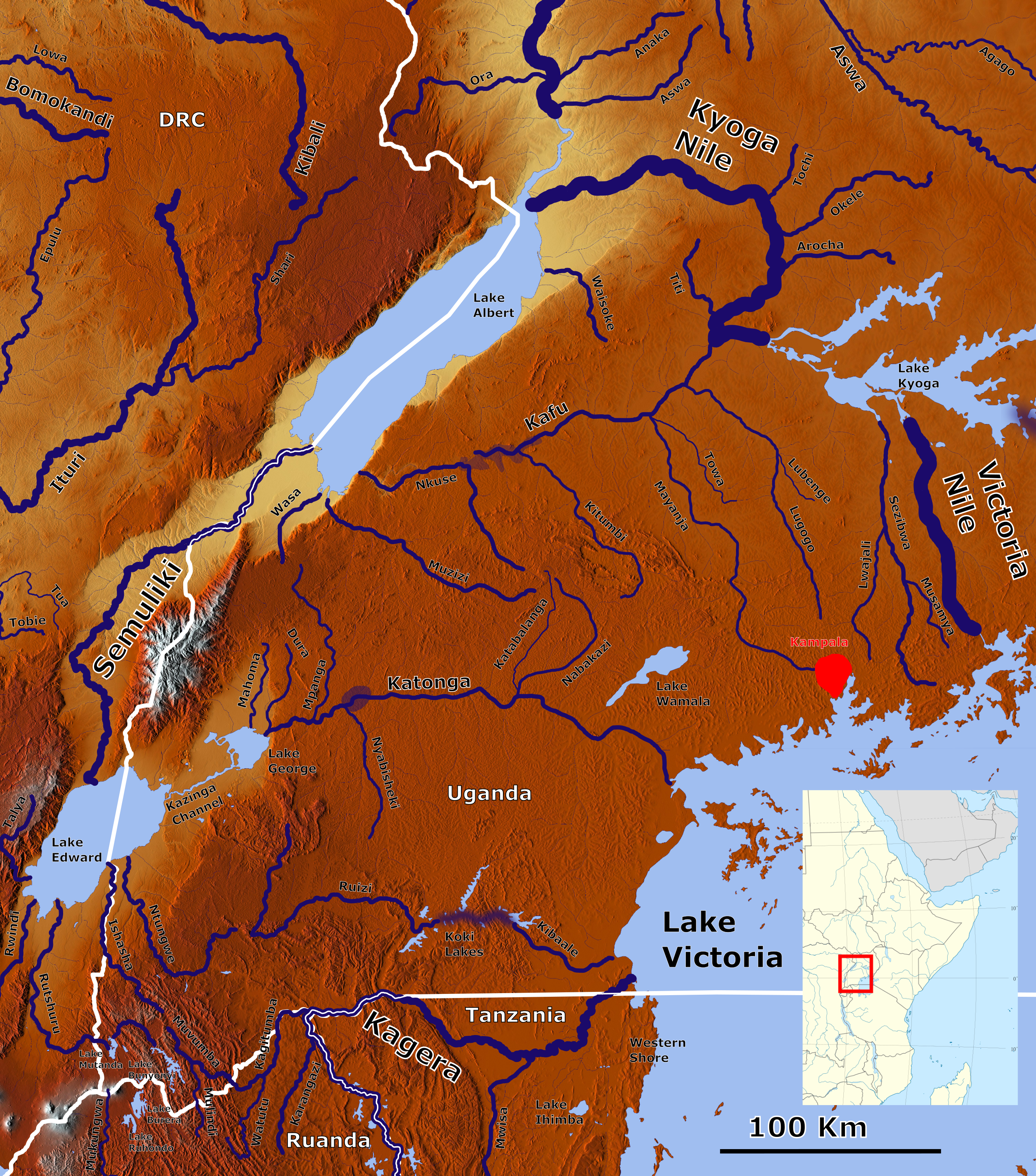
- Rivers in southwestern Uganda with the Rutshuru River (bottom corner left).

Location
- Countries: DRC; Uganda

Physical characteristics
- Source
  - coordinates: 1.249167°S 29.659996°E
- Mouth
  - coordinates: 0.642515°S 29.416237°E

The Rutshuru River (French: Rivière Rutshuru) is a river in the eastern Democratic Republic of the Congo that drains Lake Mutanda in the foothills of the Virunga Mountains in Uganda, flowing northward into Lake Rutanzige (formerly Lake Edward). For most of its length it runs through the Rutshuru Territory in North Kivu province.

== Course ==
The Rutshuru is considered the highest source of the Nile. Lake Bunyonyi, with a surface elevation of 1,962 metres (6,437 ft), is fed by the Kabirita River from Rwanda and from many affluents from the surrounding hills, which rise to elevations of 2,200 to 2,478 metres (7,218 to 8,130 ft).

Lake Bunyoni drains into the Ruhuhuma Swamp at its northern end. The eastern part of this swamp drains into the upper course of the Ishasha River, while the western part drains to Lake Mutanda at a surface elevation of 1,800 metres (5,900 ft).

Lake Mutanda discharges from its south-west corner through the Kako River and the Tshengere Swamp into the Rutshuru.

At one time, what is now Lake Kivu was in the watershed of the Rutshuru River. Volcanic eruptions at the end of the Pliocene epoch created the Virunga Mountains, blocking off this part of the drainage basin. The water rose inside the basin to form Lake Kivu, eventually breaking through at the southern end to drain into Lake Tanganyika.

In its lower reaches, the river flows through the central section of the Virunga National Park.

The Rutshuru, Rwindi and Ishasha rivers form swamps and grasslands to the south of Lake Rutanzige.

The river is home to herds of hippopotami. As of 2007, there were about 115 hippopotami per kilometer of the savannah and grass steppe along the Rutshuru River.

There has been discussion about damming the river, which would have a serious impact on the downstream riverine wetlands.

== See also ==
- Lake Bunyonyi
- Lake Edward
- Virunga National Park

== Sources ==
- Blaes, X. (October 2008). "Découpage administratif de la République Démocratique du Congo" (PDF). PNUD-SIG. Archived from the original (PDF) on 2010-04-01.
- Erfurt-Cooper, Patricia; Cooper, Malcolm (2010). Volcano and Geothermal Tourism: Sustainable Geo-Resources for Leisure and Recreation. Earthscan. ISBN 978-1-84407-870-7.
- Howell, F.; Bourlière, François (2007). African Ecology and Human Evolution. Transaction Publishers. ISBN 978-0-202-36136-9.
- Hughes, R. H.; Hughes, J. S. (1992). A directory of African wetlands. IUCN. ISBN 2-88032-949-3.
- Lambrecht, Frank L. (1991). In the shade of an acacia tree: memoirs of a health officer in Africa, 1945-1959. American Philosophical Society. ISBN 0-87169-194-9.
- UN Environment Programme (July 4, 2009). "Virunga National Park, Democratic Republic of Congo".
