= Ishasha, Uganda =

Ishasha border point
- Location of Ishasha Border Station
- Coordinates: 0°43′32″S 29°37′52″E
- Country: Uganda
- Region: Western
- District: Kanungu
- Elevation: 990 m (3,250 ft)
- Time zone: UTC+3 (East Africa Time)

Ishasha border point is a border crossing station and customs post in the Kanungu District in the Western Region of Uganda. It is inset approximately 350 metres (1,150 ft) from the Ishasha River, which is the Uganda-Democratic Republic of the Congo (DRC) border locally, and is 1.3 kilometres (0.81 mi) from the town of Ishasha, Democratic Republic of the Congo, across the river in the DRC.

== Location ==
The border point is a designated end of the Rukungiri–Kihihi–Ishasha–Kanungu Road, which partially forms the boundary of the Ishasha Sector of Queen Elizabeth National Park. Across the Ishasha River, which serves as the international border, lies the town of Ishasha, Democratic Republic of the Congo and the adjacent Virunga National Park inside which that town is situated.

The town of Kihihi is approximately 10 kilometres (6 mi) by road, southeast of Ishasha border crossing. Ishasha is located about 34 kilometres (21 mi) by road, northwest of Kanungu, the district capital. Rukungiri, the nearest large town is located approximately 58 kilometres (36 mi) by road, southeast of Ishasha border post. The geographical coordinates of Ishasha, Uganda are 0°43'32.0"S, 29°37'52.0"E (Latitude:-0.725556; Longitude:29.631111).

== Overview ==
The station is the location of a UNHCR transit centre for refugees fleeing violence in eastern DRC. From there, refugees are sent on to safer refugee settlements such as Nakivale and Kyangwali.

To the immediate north of Ishasha, Uganda is the Ishasha Sector of Queen Elizabeth National Park (QENP), in Uganda. Adjacent to QENP, across the Ishasha River, is Virunga National Park, in the DRC. The area benefits from tourist activity but personal safety remains a concern.

== See also ==
- Kanungu District
- Transport in Uganda
