= Sarah Mateke Nyirabashitsi =

Ugandan politician (1974–2024)

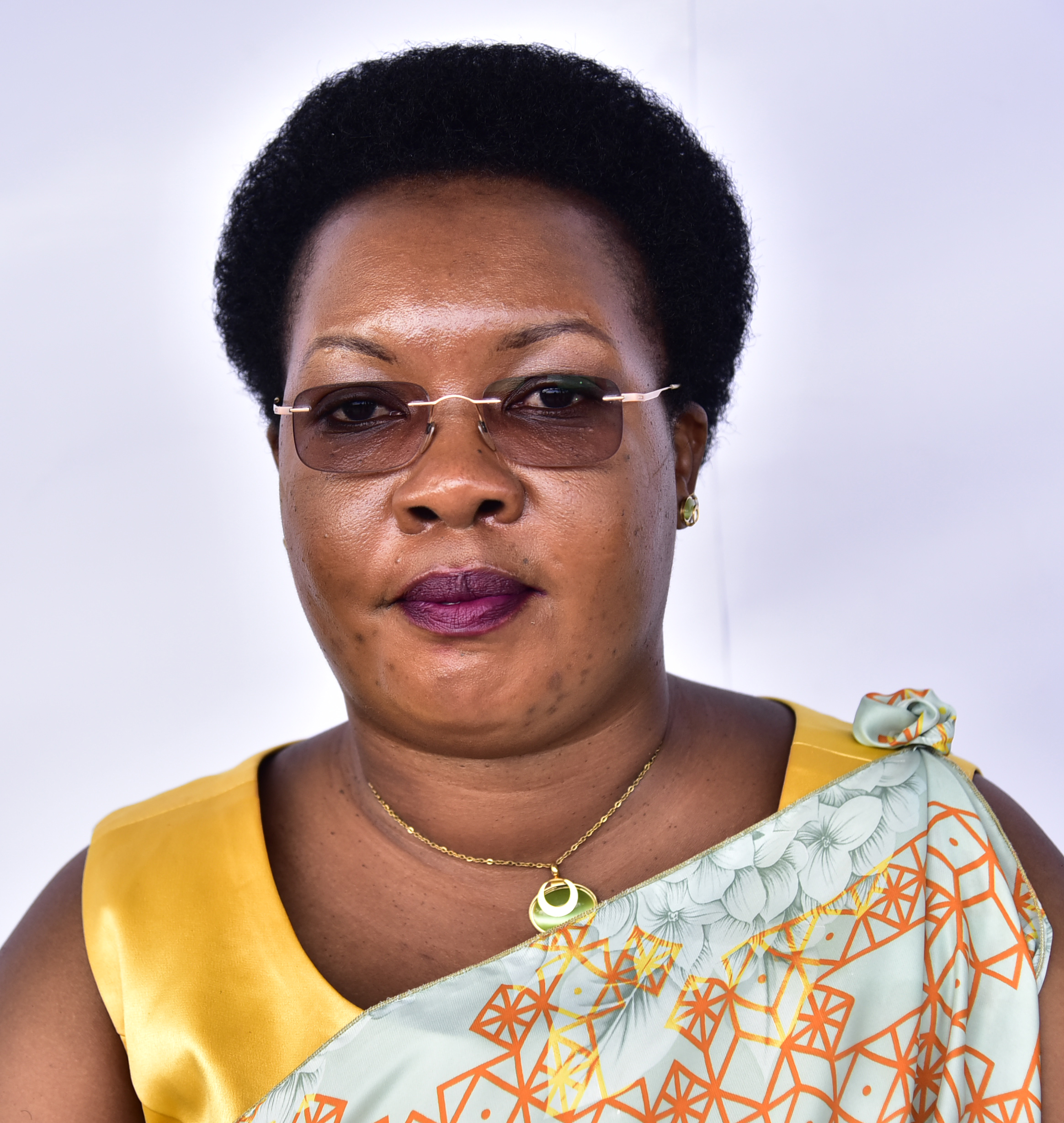
- Nyirabashitsi in 2021

Member of the Ugandan Parliament for Kisoro District 2011–2016
- In office 2021–2024
- Preceded by: Rose Kabagyenyi
- Succeeded by: Balaam Barugahara

Personal details
- Born: 15 July 1974 Chahi subcounty, Kisoro District, Uganda
- Died: 7 September 2024 (aged 50) Kampala, Uganda
- Parent: Philemon Mateke (father)
- Education: Seseme Integrate School; Maryhill High School; Bugema University; Uganda Christian University
- Occupation: Politician, educationist

Sarah Mateke Nyirabashitsi (15 July 1974 – 7 September 2024) was a Ugandan politician and educationist who was the woman representative for Kisoro District, and Minister of State for Gender, Labour and Social Development appointed in 2021 by President Yoweri Museveni in the Ugandan 11th Parliament.

== Early life and education ==
Sarah Mateke Nyirabashitsi was born on 15 July 1974 in the Chahi subcounty, Kisoro District in the Kigezi region, to Philemon Mateke and Joy Rwanfizi Mateka. She was the third born of six in the family. Her father was a politician, a former State Minister for regional affairs and her mother was a professional teacher.

Nyirabashitsi attended Seseme Integrate School then Maryhill High School for her secondary education. She joined Bugema University and graduated with a Bachelor of Business Administration degree. She also held a Master's degree in Public Health from the same University and a Postgraduate diploma in Public Administration and Management from Uganda Christian University.

== Career ==
Nyirabashitsi entered her family's businesses including timber production and transportation. She was the founder of Nyirabashitsi Foundation where she supported children to join boarding secondary schools from senior one to senior six. She was the chairperson of the Board of Trustees of the Metropolitan International University, Makerere Metropolitan Management Institute, Kampala.

Nyirabashitsi joined the public service as Assistant Town clerk of Kisoro town council.

== Political ==
In 2021, she contested the role of woman member of parliament of Kisoro District and won against incumbent Rose Kabagyeni. Nyirabashitsi was appointed Minister of State for Gender, Labour and Social Development (Children and Youth Affairs) replacing Florence Nakiwala Kiyingi. She was affiliated with the National Resistance Movement.

== Death ==
Nyirabashitsi died from a heart attack in Kampala, on 7 September 2024, at the age of 50.
