= Rose Kabagyenyi =

Ugandan politician (born 1974)

Member of the Ugandan Parliament for Kisoro District
- In office 2016–2021
- Preceded by: Sarah Mateke Nyirabashitsi
- Succeeded by: Sarah Mateke Nyirabashitsi

Personal details
- Born: 4 August 1974 (age 52)
- Party: National Resistance Movement
- Education: Makerere University; Uganda Management Institute

Rose Kabagyeni (born 4 August 1974; sometimes Rose Kabagyeni) is a Ugandan politician and former woman Member of Parliament. She was a woman Member of Parliament (MP) for the Kisoro District, a position she held from 2016 to 2021. As of 2022, she was the Senior Presidential Advisor on Agriculture in Uganda.

She is a member of the ruling National Resistance Movement political party.

== Early life and education ==
Kabagyenyi was born on 4 August 1974. She completed her primary-level education at Gikoro primary school in 1987. In 1990, she completed her Uganda Certificate of Education (UCE) for lower secondary education at the Seseme Girls secondary school in Kisoro. She attained her first certificate in agriculture in 1995 and a diploma in agriculture from the Bukalasa Agricultural College in 2000.

In 2004, Kabagyenyi achieved a Bachelor's degree in Agriculture from Makerere University in Kampala. She went further with her studies and obtained her second diploma in 2011 and a second certificate in Monitoring and Evaluation from the Uganda Management Institute in 2013.

In 2014, Kabagyenyi earned a Master's degree in Agriculture from Makerere University.

== Career ==
From 1997 to 2000, Kabagyenyi worked as the Agricultural officer for the Kisoro local government and as a district agricultural officer for the Kisoro District from 2007 to 2010.

Kabagyenyi served as a consultant for National Agricultural Advisory Services (NAADS).

As the woman member of parliament of Kisoro District she was replaced by Sarah Mateke Nyirabashitsi.

== See also ==
- Member of Parliament
- National Resistance Movement
- Parliament of Uganda
- List of members of the tenth Parliament of Uganda
- Kisoro District
