= Kigezi District =

Former district in Uganda

Coordinates: 01°13′20″S 29°53′20″E

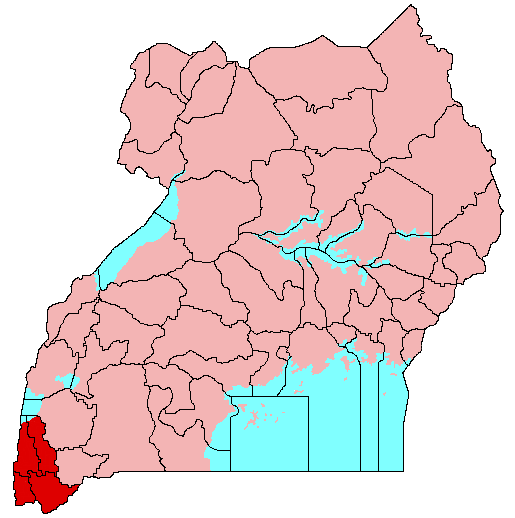
Kigezi(red)

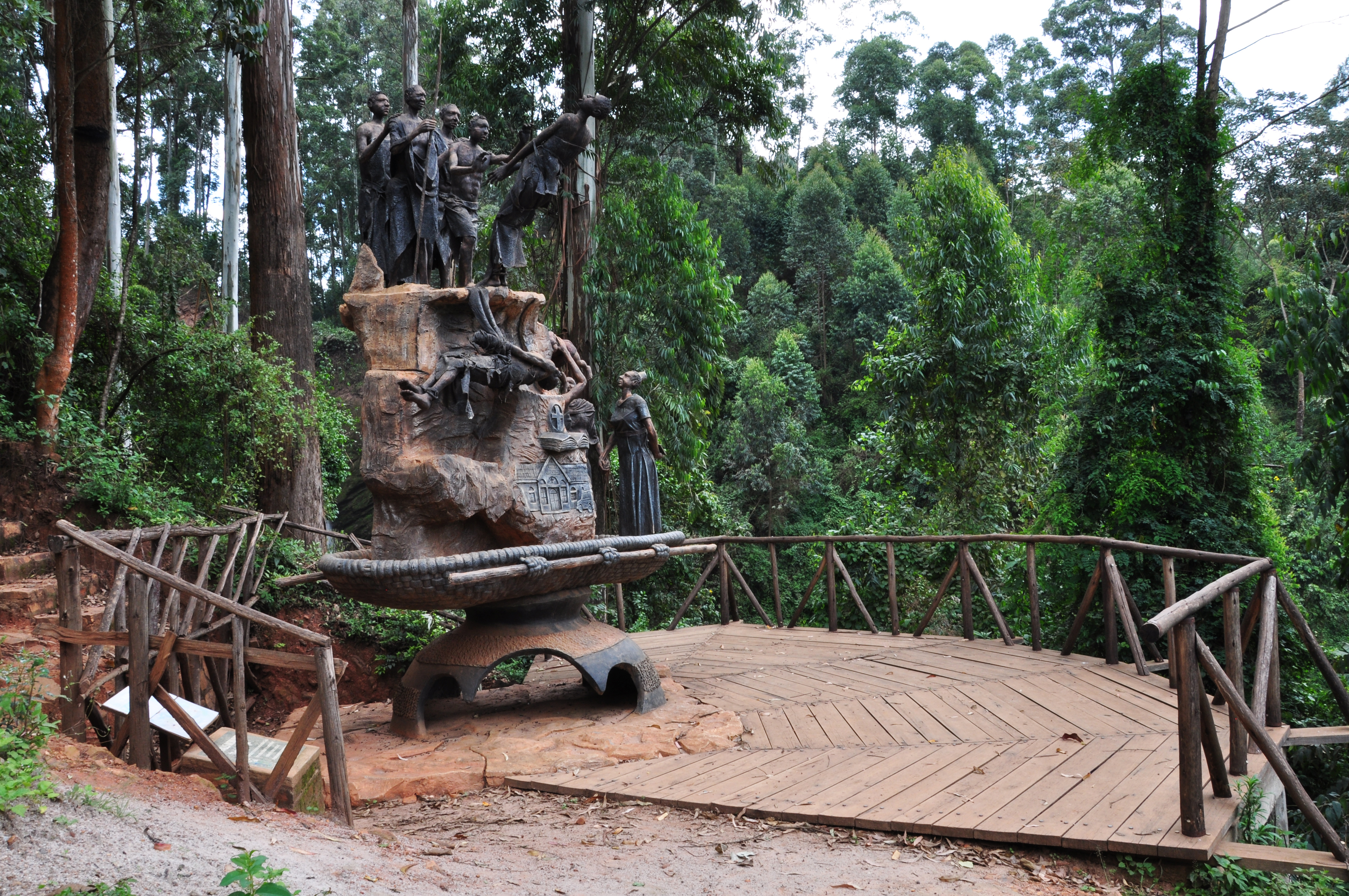
Statue found at Kisiizi falls in Kigezi Highlands.

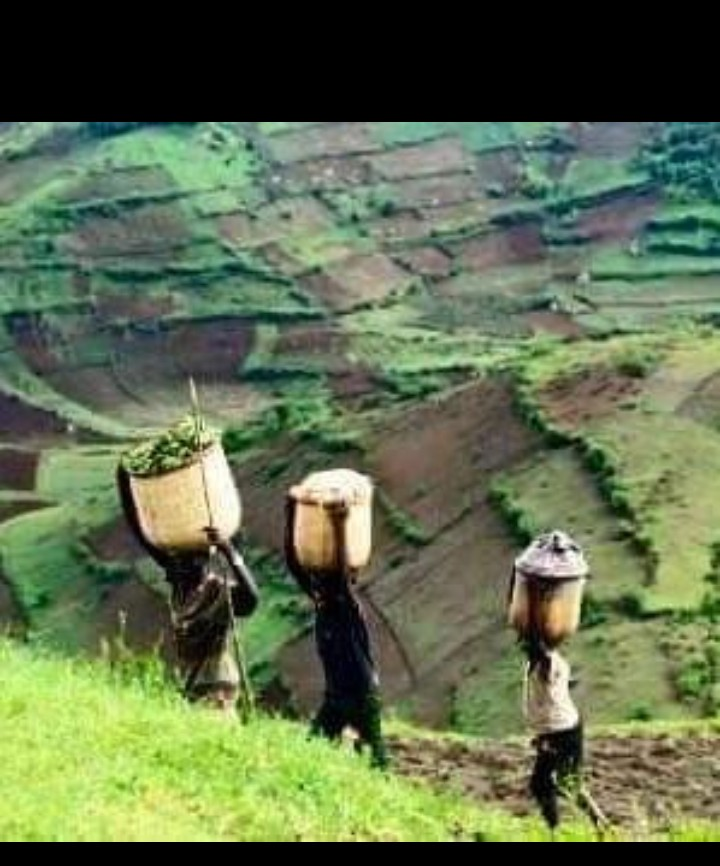
The scapes of Kigezi.

Kigezi District once covered what are now Kabale District, Kanungu District, Kisoro District and Rukungiri District, in southwest Uganda. Its terraced fields are what gives this part of Uganda its distinctive character. Kigezi was popularly known as the Switzerland of Africa. The coordinates for the region are: Latitude:01 13 20S, 29 53 20E.

== Constituencies ==
Before its division into the districts shown as above, Kigezi consisted of counties of:

- Rukiga County, southeast of modern-day Kabale District, which bordered on the then Ankole District.
- Ndorwa County, this is the central area of modern-day Kabale District, where Kabale town is still located and Lake Bunyonyi is shared with the county of Rubanda.
- Rubanda County, southwest of modern-day Kabale District, bordering Kanungu District and Kisoro District and Kinkizi County, where the famous Nyamasizi Hot Springs are located.
- Kinkizi County, northwest of modern-day Kabale District. This county shares its borders with the Democratic Republic of the Congo. It also touches on Lake Edward on the border with DRC
- Bufumbira County, southwest of modern-day Kabale District, bordering with Rubanda County. the Republic of Rwanda and the Democratic Republic of the Congo. Bufumbira County is the location of Lake Mutanda and Lake Chahafi.
- Rujumbura County, which was the most northerly county of the district and bordered on the former Ankole District and on Lake Edward.

After the division of Kigezi into the four (4) current districts, they were named after their respective main towns, namely Kabale, Kanungu, Kisoro and Rukungiri.

== People ==
The six modern districts of the former Kigezi District are inhabited predominantly by the Bakiga, Bahororo, Bafumbira and Banyarwanda people. All these ethnic groups share the similar cultural characteristics. Paul Ngologoza’s book Kigezi and Its People provides detailed information about the Bakiga people, their traditions and history.

The region is uniquely characterized by the Albertine Rift, or Western Rift Valley, and the African Great Lakes, which include Lake Bunyonyi, Lake Edward, Lake Mutanda and Lake Kyahafi. Kigezi is also the home to the chain of volcanic mountains, the Virunga Mountains, located in what is now Kisoro District, and which also form the south-west Uganda border with the Democratic Republic of Congo and Rwanda. Located in the Ugandan part of the Virunga Mountains is Mgahinga Gorilla National Park which, along with the nearby Bwindi Impenetrable National Park are home to the internationally famous mountain gorilla populations. The mountains also form part of the watershed between the two major African rivers, the Nile and the Congo, with the highest peak on the Uganda side of the border being Mount Muhabura. In the intervening valleys, often one finds expansive swampy areas, some of which, particularly those in Kabale District, have been reclaimed for pastureland.

== See also ==
- Kabale District
- Kanungu District
- Kisoro District
- Rukungiri District
- Kabale
