= Ishasha Airport (Democratic Republic of the Congo) =

- IATA: none; ICAO: FZNI

Summary
- Location: Ishasha, Democratic Republic of the Congo
- Elevation AMSL: 3,390 ft / 1,033 m
- Coordinates: 0°44′29″S 29°37′28″E

Map
- Location of airport in the Democratic Republic of the Congo

Runways
Direction	Length		Surface
Direction	m	ft	Surface
03/21	1,100	3,609	Grass
- Source: OurAirports Google Maps

Ishasha Airport (ICAO: FZNI) is an airport serving Ishasha, a town in the North Kivu Province of Democratic Republic of the Congo.

The runway has a 1,100 metres (3,600 ft) grass strip clear of structures, opening into a further 400 metres (1,300 ft) open field, however it has trees and shrubbery growing in it.

The town of Ishasha is on the Ishasha River, locally the border with Uganda.

== See also ==
- Transport in the Democratic Republic of the Congo
- List of airports in the Democratic Republic of the Congo
