= Kihihi =

Kihihi Kihiihi
- Location in Uganda
- Coordinates: 00°44′46″S 29°42′01″E
- Country: Uganda
- Region: Western Uganda
- Sub-region: Kigezi sub-region
- District: Kanungu District
- Elevation: 3,740 ft (1,140 m)

Population (2014 Census)
  - Total: 20,349
- Time zone: UTC+3 (East Africa Time)
- Climate: Aw

Kihihi, also spelt Kihiihi, is a town in Southwestern Uganda. It is the second-largest metropolitan area in Kanungu District, after Kanungu, where the district headquarters are located.

== Location ==
Kihihi is located approximately 113 kilometres (70 mi), by road, northwest of Kabale, the largest city in the sub-region. Kihihi is located approximately 16 kilometres (10 mi), by road, northwest of Kanungu, where the district headquarters are located. The coordinates of Kihiihi are:0°44'56.0"S, 29°42'01.0"E (Latitude:-0.748889; Longitude:29.700278).

== Overview ==
Kihihi is a small town in Kanungu District, approximately 30 kilometres (19 mi), by road, southeast of the International border with the Democratic Republic of the Congo at Ishasha. The straight distance is about 16 kilometres (10 mi), but due to the mountainous terrain, the roads are tortuous and winding. The town accommodates a large refugee camp administered by the United Nations High Commission for Refugees (UNHCR). It also has one bank (Stanbic Bank), one ATM and several motels and lodges.

== Population ==
In 2002, the population census put the population of the town at 15,935. In 2010, the Uganda Bureau of Statistics (UBOS), estimated the population of Kihiihi at approximately 18,800. In 2011, UBOS estimated the population at 19,200 people. In 2014, the national population census put the population of Kihiihi at 20,349.

== Points of interest ==
The following points of interest are found in Kihiihi, or close to its town limits:

- The offices and refugee camp of the UNHCR.
- The offices of Kihihi Town Council
- Kihihi Farmers Market
- Garuga Airstrip
- Kinkiizi Radio Station
- Kinkizi Polytechnic
- Religious Worshiping Centres
- Sevpnary Schools

== See also ==
- Kanungu District
- Kigezi sub-region
- Ugandan Towns
