= Lake Mulehe =

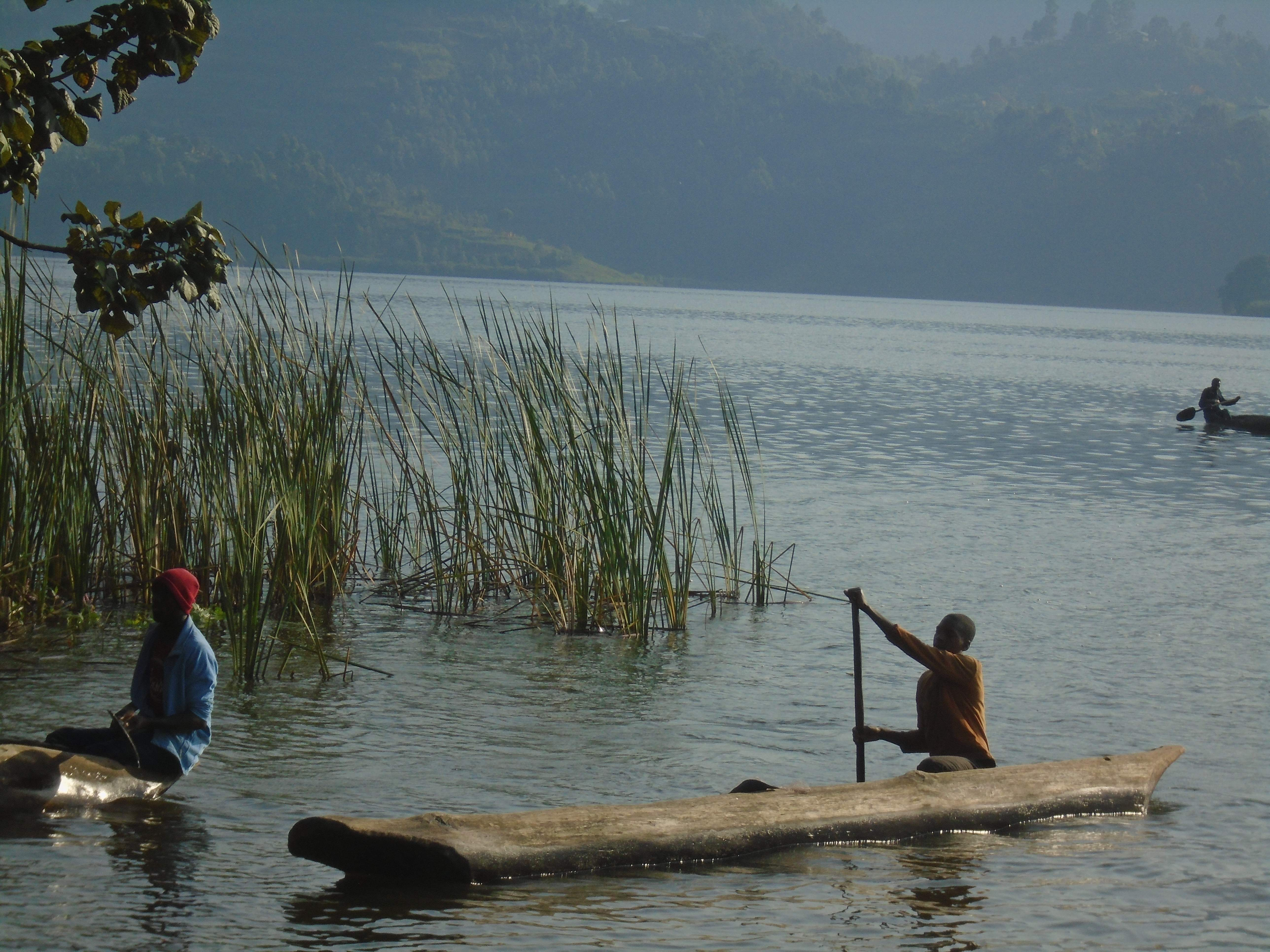

- Location within Uganda
- Location: Kisoro District, Uganda
- Coordinates: 1°13′05.0″S 29°43′21.9″E
- Type: Crater lake
- Part of: Albertine Rift
- Basin countries: Uganda

Lake Mulehe is a crater lake situated in the Kisoro District of southwestern Uganda, close to the border with Rwanda. This lake is a part of the Albertine Rift, which is well known for its biological diversity and visually striking landscapes.

== Geography ==
Lake Mulehe is located around 1°13'05.0"S 29°43'21.9"E and an elevation of roughly 1,800 meters above sea level. Surrounded by verdant vegetation and terraced hills characteristic of the area's volcanic topography, it is relatively small, spanning approximately 4.11 square kilometers.

== Biodiversity ==
The lake and its surroundings are a heaven a variety of bird species, making it a favored spot for birdwatching. Some notable bird species found in the area include the grey crowned crane and other endemic species of the Albertine Rift such as the Rwenzori turaco and Rwenzori nightjar. The lake's ecosystem also supports various aquatic species, while the surrounding areas boast diverse flora and fauna.

== Tourism and activities ==
Lake Mulehe, situated in the Virunga Mountains, has recently gained popularity among tourists due to its scenic beauty, diverse wildlife, and cultural experiences. The area offers various recreational activities such as birdwatching, boating, and hiking. The striking backdrop of the Virunga Mountains, which include Muhabura, Mgahinga, and Sabinyo, further contributes to the aesthetic appeal of the region. Lake Mulehe often forms part of tours exploring the neighboring Bwindi Impenetrable National Park, which is renowned for its mountain gorilla population.

== Cultural significance ==
The local communities surrounding Lake Mulehe possess a diverse cultural heritage, characterized by traditional practices and lifestyles that attract cultural tourism. Tourists often engage with these communities to gain insight into their customs, crafts, and way of life. The Bakiga and Bafumbira peoples, who reside in the region, are known for their hospitable nature and vibrant cultural dances.

== Conservation efforts ==
As part of the Albertine Rift, various conservation efforts are in place to maintain the natural beauty and biodiversity of Lake Mulehe and its surrounding areas. These initiatives aim to promote sustainable tourism and protect the environment from the potential impacts of human activities. Efforts are made to balance the needs of local communities with the preservation of the lake's ecosystem.
