= Lake Mutanda =

Lake in Uganda

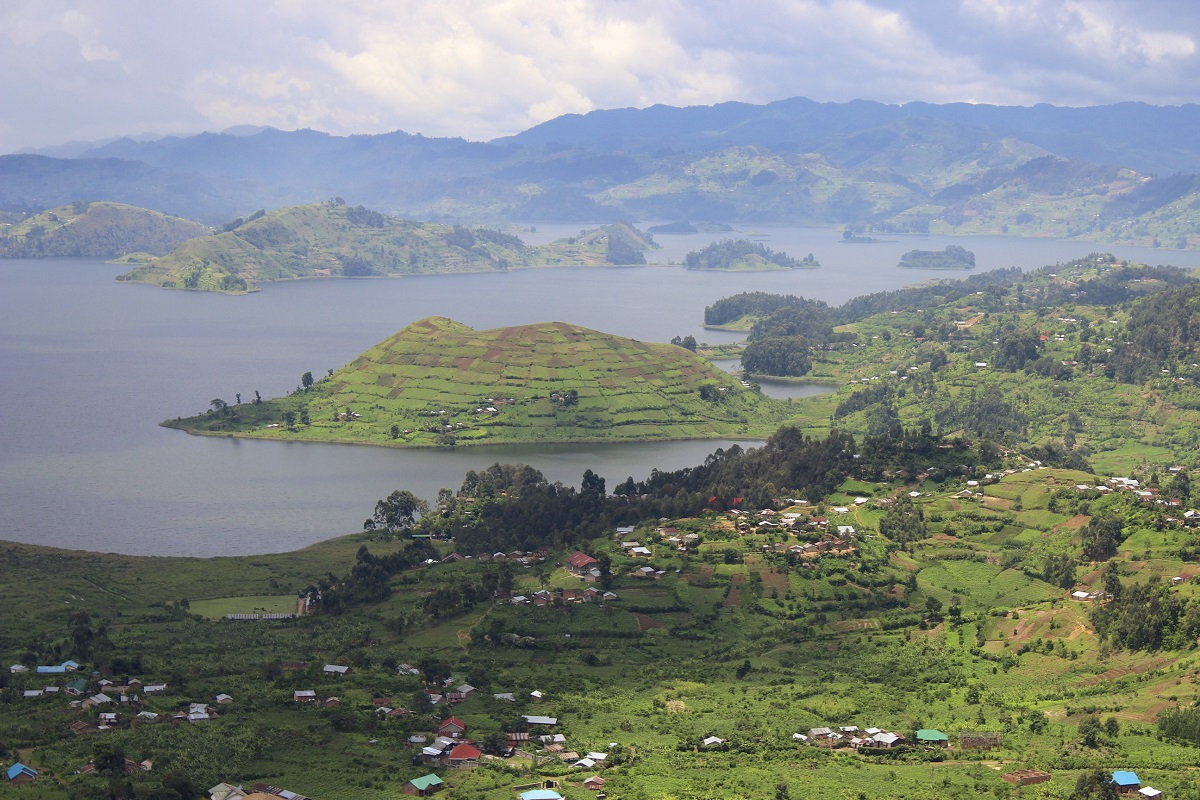

- Location within Uganda
- Location: Kisoro District, Uganda
- Coordinates: 01°14′06″S 29°40′12″E
- Basin countries: Uganda
- Surface area: 29 km^{2} (11 mi^{2})
- Max. depth: 56 m (184 ft)
- Surface elevation: 1,792 m (5,879 ft)
- Settlements: Kisoro, Uganda
- Website: lakemutanda.com

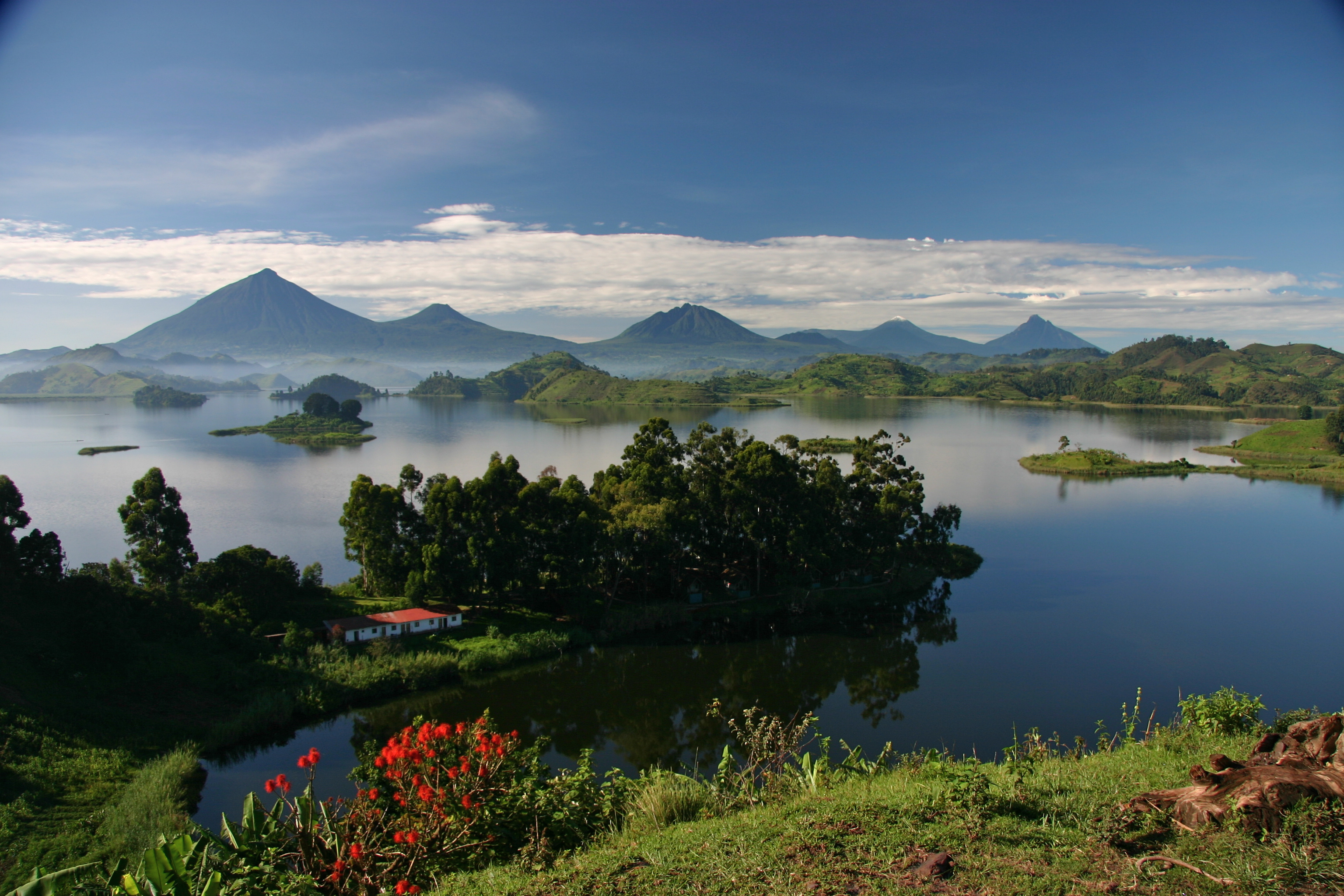
Lake Mutanda in Uganda

Lake Mutanda is a small freshwater lake in Uganda.

== Location ==
The lake is located in Kisoro District in southwestern Uganda, approximately 20 kilometres (12 mi) north of the town of Kisoro, where the district headquarters are located. This location is approximately 454 kilometres (282 mi), by road, southwest of Kampala, Uganda's capital and largest city. The coordinates of Lake Mutanda are:01 14 06S, 29 40 12E (Latitude:-1.2350; Longitude:29.6700).

== Overview ==
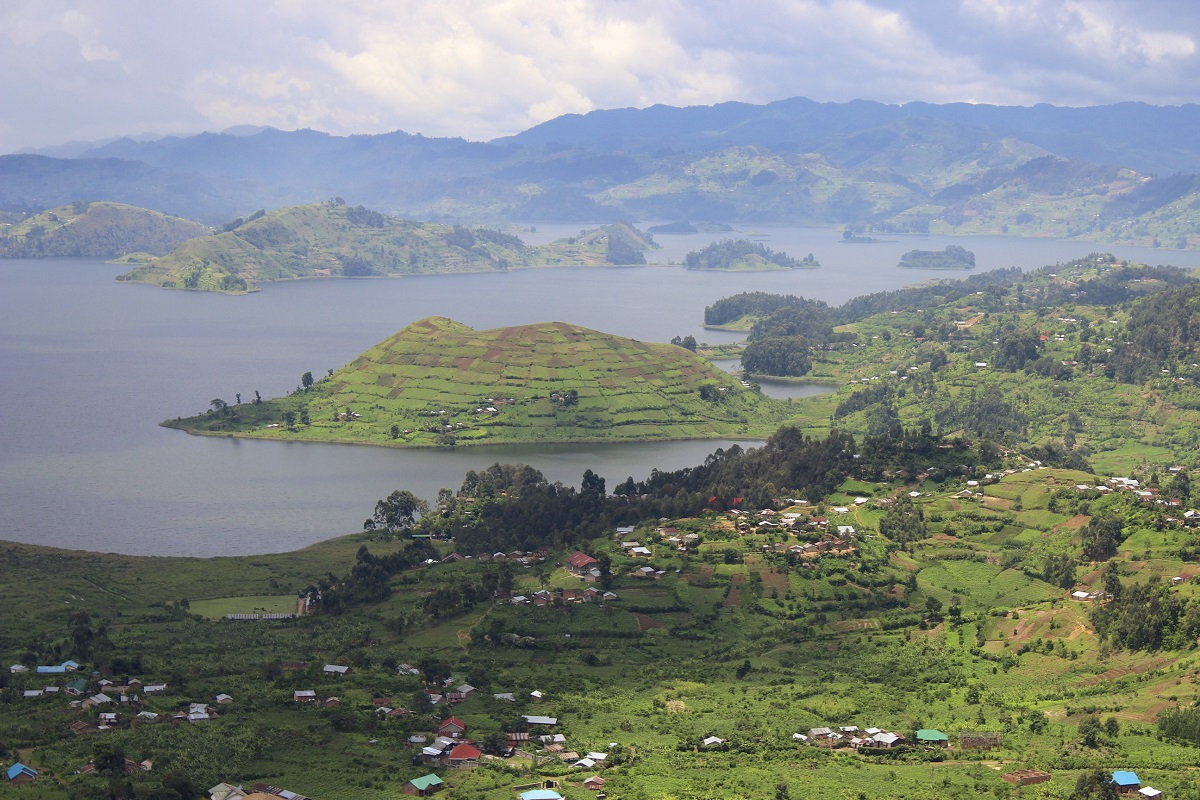
Lake Mutanda.

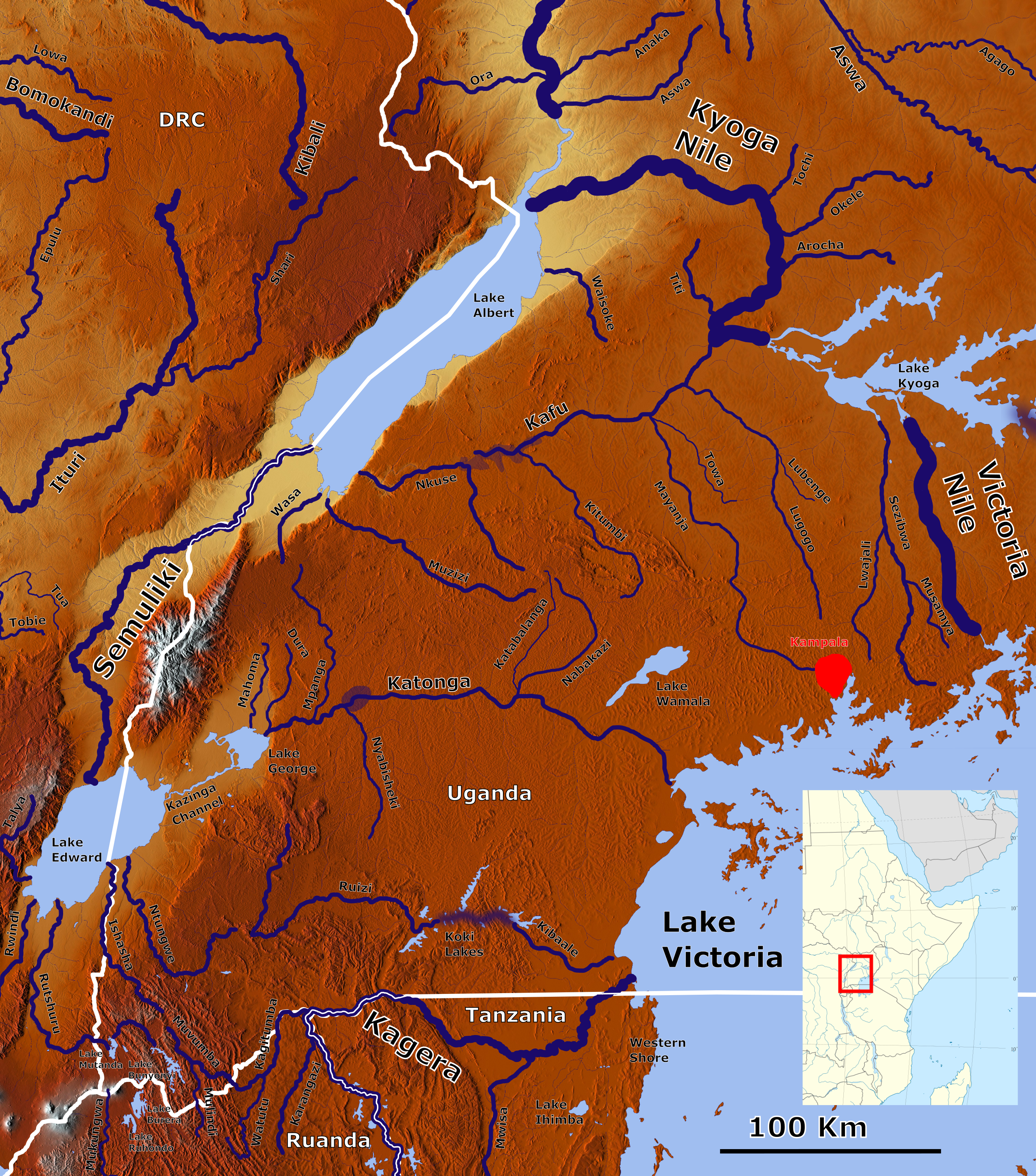
Rivers and lakes of south west Uganda. Lake Mutanda is the second largest of the lakes in the south western tip of Uganda.

It is nestled in the foothills of the Virunga Mountain Range, at an altitude of 1,800 metres (5,900 ft). The three volcanoes within the range, that are partly located in Uganda, namely: Mount Muhabura, Mount Sabinyo and Mount Gahinga, can be viewed from Lake Mutanda. There are several islands in the lake. The lake is drained by the Rutshuru River, which flows northward to Lake Edward.

== Flora and fauna ==
The environment on the islands within the lake and the surrounding countryside includes lakeside forests and wetland habitats that provide a haven for the endangered mountain gorilla.

In addition to the mountain gorilla and golden monkey in the nearby Mgahinga Gorilla National Park, the lakeside environment accommodates a variety of animal and plant species, unique to this area. Bird species include kingfisher birds, kites, ibis and Uganda's national bird, the crested crane. Weaver bird nests are a common site among the reeds along the lake shore.

In addition to the abundant and varied avian species, the lake shore supports several species of snake, chameleon, monitor lizard and frog species. There is a varied and abundant supply of insect life as well. The mammals found in Lake Mutanda include the African clawless otter. Hippopotamus was also present in the area, but were last sighted at Lake Mutanda in 1994.

== See also ==
- Kisoro
- Kisoro District
- Kigezi
