= Yvonne Mpambara =

Ugandan lawyer (born 1991)

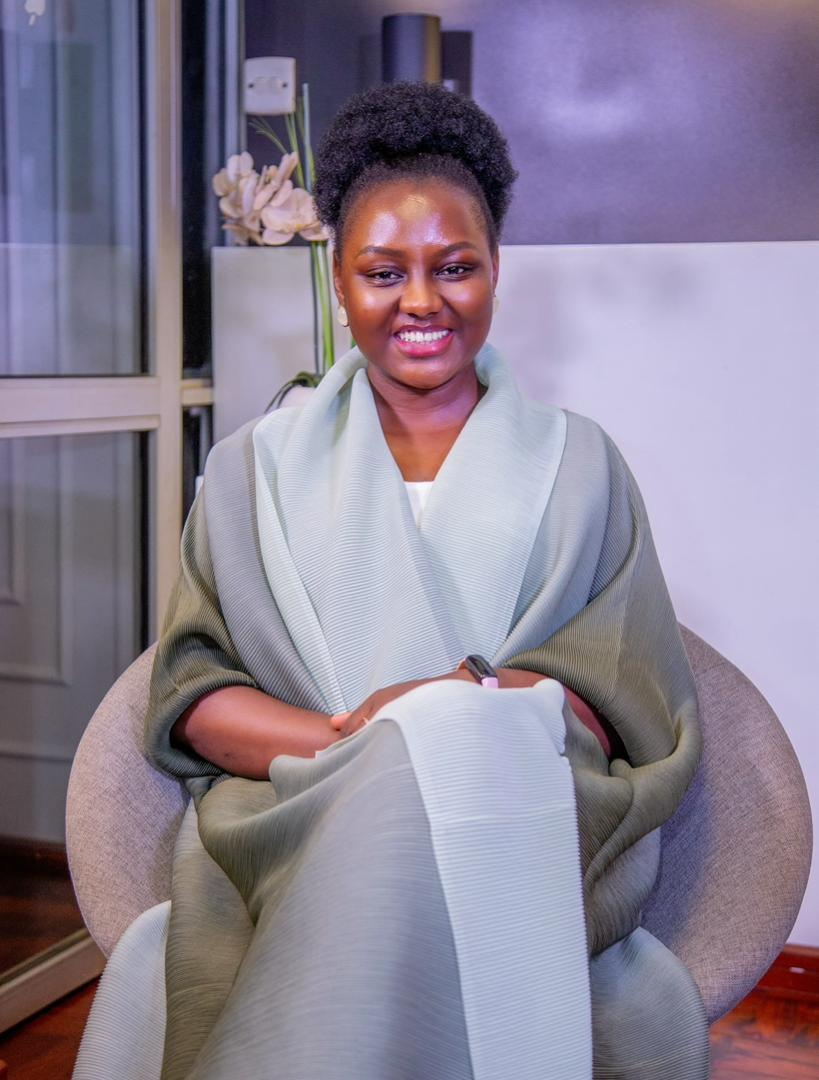
- Born: 1991 (age 34–35); Kanungu, Western Region, Uganda
- Education: Makerere University
- Occupation: Lawyer
- Years active: 2016–present
- Political party: Independent (until 2025); Women Freedom Fighters (2025–present)

Yvonne Mpambara (born c. 1991) is a Ugandan lawyer and activist. In 2025, she announced her candidacy as an independent candidate in the 2026 presidential election, though she did not make the final ballot.

== Early life and education ==
Mpambara was born in Kanungu, a town in the Western Region of Uganda; she was raised in Kabale. Mpambara's father died when she was a child.

Mpambara attended Makerere University in Kampala, graduating with an LLB in law.

== Career ==
=== Legal work ===
Mpambara worked with various human rights and civil society organisations, including SRHR Alliance Uganda, Reach a Hand Uganda, and the African Youth Caucus. In 2016, she was among a group of activists from the Forum for Women in Democracy arrested outside the National Theatre of Uganda; they had been planning to march to the Parliament of Uganda to protest plans to amend the Ugandan constitution to remove presidential age limits, which would have allowed for the long-term President of Uganda, Yoweri Museveni, to run for additional terms. The Constitutional Amendment Bill No. 2 2017 was ultimately signed into law on 27 December 2017.

=== Presidential campaign ===
On 26 August 2025, Mpambara announced her intention to run as an independent presidential candidate for the 2026 general election. Only three women had previously successfully ran as candidates for president, with none of them being elected. Of 15 women who signed an official expression of interest in running, only three, including Mpambara, gained enough signatures from voters to be considered as potential candidates for the official ballot published by the Electoral Commission of Uganda.

Mpambara's campaign advocated for inclusive governance, service delivery and legal reform, and stressed Uganda's status as a regional leader in East Africa. She called for greater decentralisation from Kampala to ensure that the regions and districts were appropriately represented in decision-making. Mpambara criticised the government's use of resources and its laws impacting disadvantaged communities, including boda boda riders, women, young people, the disabled, veterans, farmers, artists, sex workers, gig economy workers and frontline medics. She cited laws restricting access to sexual and reproductive health services as leading to an increase in the number of teenage pregnancies. Mpambara used the hashtag "#ShiftThePower" to promote her campaign.

== Smear campaign ==
On 25 September 2025, the Electoral Commission confirmed eight presidential candidates for the 2026 election; no women were selected. Mpambara subsequently filed a complaint with the commission, describing the criteria for receiving approval as a candidate as being "unclear" and accusing security forces of sabotaging her attempts to gain signatures from a majority of Ugandan districts, a prerequisite for confirmation as an official candidate, which she stated caused her to lose "thousands" of signatures. The Electoral Commission did not uphold Mpambara's complaint, nor the complaints of other female candidates.

Following the end of her campaign, Mpambara wrote an article for the British newspaper The Guardian in which she reported that she had received harassment from men throughout her campaign, including being propositioned for sex, in addition to being smeared as a "Rwandan spy" and accused of having sex with the president of Rwanda, Paul Kagame. She described the campaign as being "one of the most disrespectful periods of [her] life". Mpambara additionally criticised the Electoral Commission for only endorsing candidates from long-established political parties, stating that such parties did not give positions of power or authority to women, preventing them from running as official party candidates for the presidency.

=== Subsequent activism ===
Following the culmination of her campaign, Mpambara created the Foundation for Female Presidential Aspirants, which aimed to support future female leaders in Uganda. She also expressed her intention to establish an all-female political party, the Women Freedom Fighters.

== See also ==
- 2021 Ugandan general election
- Nancy Kalembe
- 2026 Ugandan general election
