= Paul Ngologoza =

Ugandan writer

Sir Paul Ngologoza
- Born: c. 1897; Rwanyena, Rubaya (present-day Kabale District), Uganda Protectorate
- Died: 1984
- Occupations: Local government official, writer
- Notable work: Kigezi and its People
- Awards: Officer of the Order of the British Empire (OBE)

Paul Ngologoza OBE, KSG (born 1897) was a Ugandan political leader and writer of Kigezi n'Abantu Baamwo which was later translated to Kigezi and Its People.

== Early life and career ==
Ngologoza was born in 1897 at Rwanyana (now in Kabale District), in then Kigezi District, he belonged to the Abainika sub clan of the Ba -Muhuntu clan and he attended the pre-baptismal lessons in 1922.

Ngologoza started his career as a chief (Mukungu) in 1923 and in 1925 he became a parish (Muruka) chief. He became a Sub-county chief (Gomborora) in 1929 and a county (Saza) chief in 1936, first of Kinkizi, then Rukiga.

Ngologoza was appointed as the secretary general of Kigezi in 1946 by the colonial rulers. In 1956, he served as the district's chief judge until 1959 and also served as a chairman of the appointments board for a short period of time before his retirement in 1960.

In 1967, Ngologoza was called out of his retirement to serve as the deputy speaker of the District Council. When he retired from public service, he was honored as an Officer of the Order of the British Empire (OBE) and a Knight Commander of the pontifical Equestrian Order of St. Gregory the Great (KSG).

== Legacy ==
Historians have treated Ngologoza as a significant figure in the politics and documentary record of Kigezi, including through references to his papers and archives in later historical writing. His role in regional politics and debates around religious movements in southern Uganda is also discussed in published academic work.

== His death ==
Ngologoza died in 1984 and was buried at his home in Bukinda (southeast of Kabale).

== Recognition ==
In Kabale there is a street that was named after him and a girls' scholarship program which was launched by the Uganda Chapter of the International Community of Banyakigezi.

== See also ==
- Kigezi
- Rukiga
- Bakiga
