= Kanungu Hydroelectric Power Station =

Dam in Kanungu District, Uganda

- Map of Uganda showing the location of Kanungu. Kanungu Hydroelectric Power Station (Africa) Kanungu Hydroelectric Power Station (Earth)
- Country: Uganda
- Location: Kanungu, Kanungu District
- Coordinates: 00°52′53″S 29°40′14″E
- Purpose: Power
- Status: Operational
- Opening date: 18 March 2011
- Owner: Eco Power Private Limited
- Operator: Eco Power Private Limited

Dam and spillways
- Impounds: Ishasha River

Power Station
- Commission date: 18 March 2011
- Installed capacity: 6.6 megawatts (8,900 hp)

Kanungu Power Station is a 6.6-megawatt (8,900 hp) run-of-the-river hydroelectric power station on the Ishasha River in Uganda. The station is sometimes referred to as the Ishasha Power Station.

== Location ==
The power station is in the Kanyantorogo sub-county of Kanungu District in southwestern Uganda, about 34 kilometres (21 mi) by road from the district headquarters in the town of Kanungu, although the straight air distance is only about 12 kilometres (7 mi). The geographical coordinates of the power station are: 0°52'53.0"S, 29°40'14.0"E (Latitude:-0.881389; Longitude:29.670556).

The dam and weir on the Ishasha River are 500 metres (1,600 ft) downstream from the boundary of the Bwindi Impenetrable National Park. A 1,140-metre (3,740 ft) penstock takes water downstream to the twin-Francis turbine power station, for a rated head of 91 metres (299 ft). A tailrace then takes water from the power station and returns it to the Ishasha River. Provision has been made for an open-pipe flow of 250 liters per second into the section of the river between the dam and the tailrace to ensure that local fish species are not adversely affected. A seven-kilometre (4.3 mi), 33-kilovolt transmission line connects the power station to the national grid.

== History ==
The power station was constructed by Eco Power Uganda Limited, a subsidiary of Eco Power Holdings Limited of Sri Lanka. Construction was completed in March 2011. The power plant was technically commissioned on 18 March 2011. Political commissioning was performed on 22 November 2011. The plant is expected to support development of industries and stimulate other areas of investment in Kanungu and the surrounding rural areas, including parts of the neighboring Democratic Republic of the Congo.

== See also ==
- List of power stations in Uganda
