= Bufuka =

Coordinates: 1.2788°S 29.9349°E

Bufuka Village lies on the eastern coast of Lake Bunyonyi, in Kigezi sub-region seven kilometres out of Kabale town, southwestern Uganda. It is a village of 350 people and has three islands under its jurisdiction.

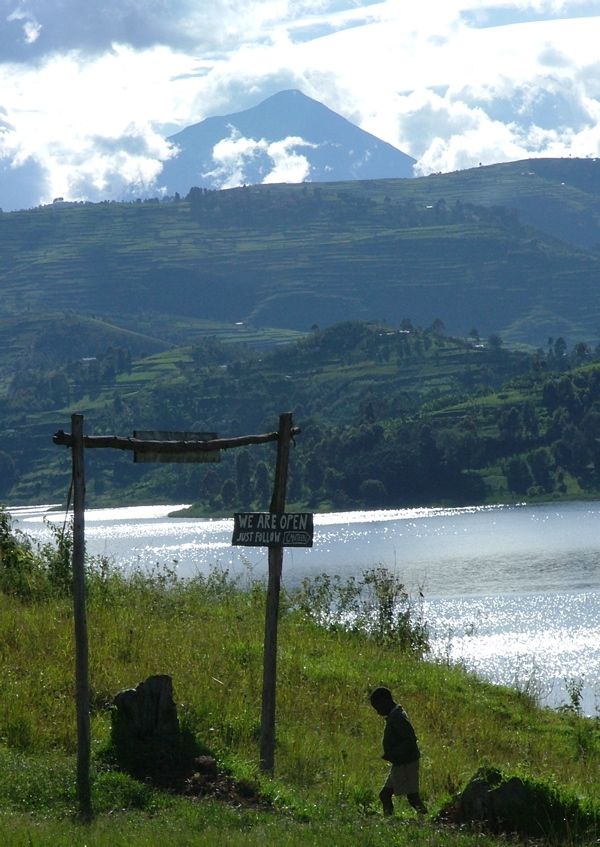
Bufuka

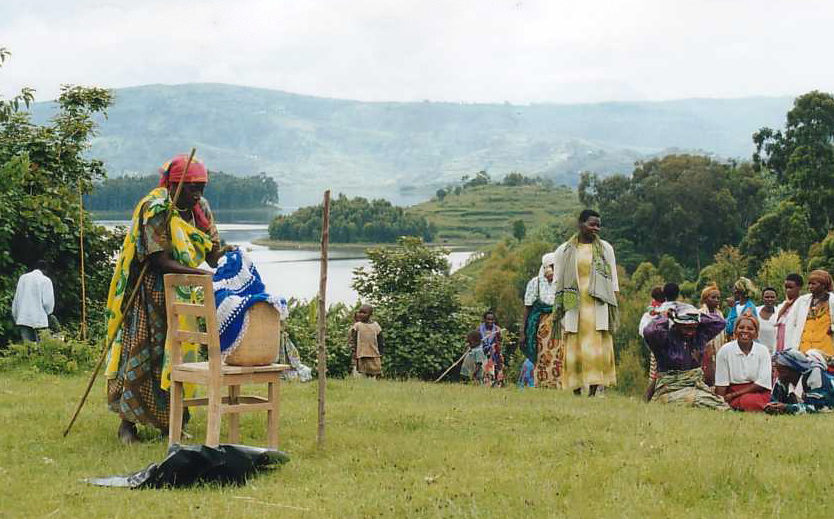
People in Bufuka

Being the closest place to the town, the area got the first tourist hotel already in the 1960s. Today the building is a ruin but there are five other operating tourist sites at Bufuka. The trading centre called Rutindo is the site of the bi-weekly market.

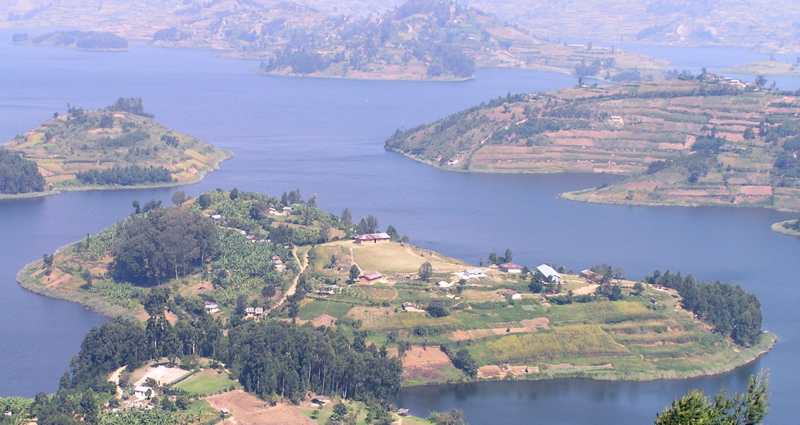
The Bufuka peninsula

The main part of the village is a peninsula where a Protestant church now lies. Bufuka Primary School was an outshoot of the church starting in 1938.
