= Ishasha River Camp Airport =

Airport in Uganda

- IATA: none; ICAO: none

Summary
- Airport type: Public
- Serves: Ishasha River Camp, Queen Elizabeth National Park
- Elevation AMSL: 3,140 ft (960 m)
- Coordinates: 00°36′50″S 29°39′55″E

Map
- Location of the airport in Uganda

Runways
| Direction | Length | | Surface |
| Direction | ft | m | Surface |
|---|---|---|---|
| 05/23 | 3,300 | 1,006 | Gravel |
- Sources: Google Maps OpenStreetMap

Ishasha River Camp Airport is an airport serving the Ishasha River Camp and the Queen Elizabeth National Park in Uganda.

The Kisoro non-directional beacon (Ident: KS) is located 39.9 nautical miles (73.9 km) south of the airport.

Ishasha River Camp is on the Ugandan side of the Ishasha River (which is locally the Uganda-Democratic Republic of the Congo border) and is a base camp for tourist safaris into the Ishasha section of the park. Several trails and roads fan out from the camp into the park.

== See also ==
- Transport in Uganda
- List of airports in Uganda
