= Ishasha, Democratic Republic of the Congo =

Town in the Democratic Republic of the Congo

Ishasha
- Town
- Ishasha
- Location in Democratic Republic of the Congo
- Coordinates: 00°44′27″S 29°37′24″E
- Country: Democratic Republic of the Congo
- Province: North Kivu
- Territory: Rutshuru Territory
- Elevation: 996 m (3,268 ft)
- Time zone: UTC+2 (Central Africa Time)
- National language: Swahili

Ishasha is a town in the Democratic Republic of the Congo (DRC). The town sits across the Ishasha River, which acts as the international border, from the much smaller Ishasha Border Post, in neighboring Uganda. This town has seen much human translocations during the last decade of the 20th century and the first 20 years of the 21 century, as a result of refugees fleeing the two Congo Wars and the associated subsequent armed militia conflicts.

== Location ==
Ishasha is located at the border with Uganda, approximately 134 kilometres (83 mi) by road, northeast of the city of Goma, the provincial capital. Ishasha is located in Rutshuru Territory, one of the administrative divisions of North Kivu Province. Rutshuru, the capital of the namesake province is located approximately 65 kilometres (40 mi), by road, southwest of Ishasha.

The geographical coordinates of Ishasha, DRC are 0°44'27.0"S, 29°37'24.0"E (Latitude:-0.740833; Longitude:29.623333).

== Overview ==
The communities around the town of Ishasha, DRC have suffered multiple dislocations during the last 30 years, starting with the First Congo War in the late 1990s, followed by the Second Congo War in the early 2000s and the subsequent civil unrest in the eastern part of the country, as a result of multiple armed insurgencies and insurrections.

== Other considerations ==
To the immediate north of Ishasha, DRC is the Virunga National Park, and adjacent to that, across the Ishasha River, is Queen Elizabeth National Park in Uganda. The area benefits from tourist activity but personal safety concerns persist.

== See also ==
- Ishasha, Uganda
