= Rubanda =

- Location in Uganda
- Coordinates: 01°11′11″S 29°50′36″E
- Country: Uganda
- Region: Western Uganda
- District: Rubanda District
- Elevation: 6,617 ft (2,017 m)

Rubanda is a town in the extreme southwest of the Western Region of Uganda. It serves as the commercial, political and administrative center of Rubanda District.

== Location ==
Rubanda is located approximately 35 kilometres (22 mi), by road, west of Kabale, the largest city in the Kigezi sub-region. This is approximately 174 kilometres (108 mi), by road, southwest of Mbarara, the largest city in Uganda's Western Region. Rubanda is about 422 kilometres (262 mi), by road, southwest of Kampala, the largest city and capital of Uganda. The town's geographical coordinates are: 01°11'11.0"S, 29°50'36.0"E (Latitude:-1.186389; Longitude:29.843333). The town sits at an elevation of 2,017 metres (6,617 ft), above sea level.

== Points of interest ==
The Kabale–Kisoro–Bunagana Road passes through Rubanda town in a north to south direction.

== See also ==
- Henry Banyenzaki
- George Wilson Kanyeihamba
