= Philemon Mateke =

Ugandan politician (born 1933)

- Born: 1933 (age 92–93); Uganda
- Citizenship: Uganda
- Education: Makerere University (Bachelor of Arts) (Master of Arts in History) (Doctor of Philosophy)
- Occupations: Academic & Politician
- Years active: 1966 — present
- Known for: Politics

Philemon Mateke (born in 1933), is a Ugandan politician. He is a formerMinister of State for Regional Affairs in the Ugandan Cabinet. He was appointed to that position on 1 March 2015, replacing Asuman Kiyingi, who was appointed State Minister of Works. On account of his cabinet post, he is an Ex-Officio Member of Parliament. He is also the first and current Chancellor of Metropolitan International University, Kisoro.

== Early life ==
He was born in Kisoro District, Western Uganda, circa 1933. After attending local elementary schools, he was admitted to Kigezi College Butobere, where he completed his O-Level studies. He transferred to Busoga College Mwiri, where he completed his A-Level education. He was admitted to Makerere University, where he obtained the degrees of Bachelor of Arts, Master of Arts in India and Doctor of Philosophy at University of London. His chosen area of study was History.

== Career ==
Following his studies at Makerere, Mateke worked as a Lecturer in the Department of History at Makerere University from the late 1960s until the late 1970s. During the Obote II regime, from 1980 until 1985, he served as the State Minister of Education. A member of the Uganda People's Congress prior to 1986, he became a member of the National Resistance Movement (NRM), soon after NRM captured power. He served in the National Resistance Council, which was the parliament of the times, from 1989 to 1996. In the 1996 election he was incharge of the Elect Museveni Task Force. He served a member of the Parliamentary Commission and later as State Minister for Labor and Industrial Relations 1998–2001. In the 2001 election, he was elected unopposed as the Chairman of Kisoro District Council (LC5). In 2011, at the end of his five-year term, he retired, until he was named State Minister for Regional Affairs on 1 March 2015. His appointment was approved by parliament on Wednesday 18 March 2015. Mateke was installed as the first Chancellor of Metropolitan International University in February 2019.

== See also ==
- Cabinet of Uganda
- Parliament of Uganda
- Government of Uganda
- African Union
