= Mount Sabyinyo =

Mountain in eastern Africa

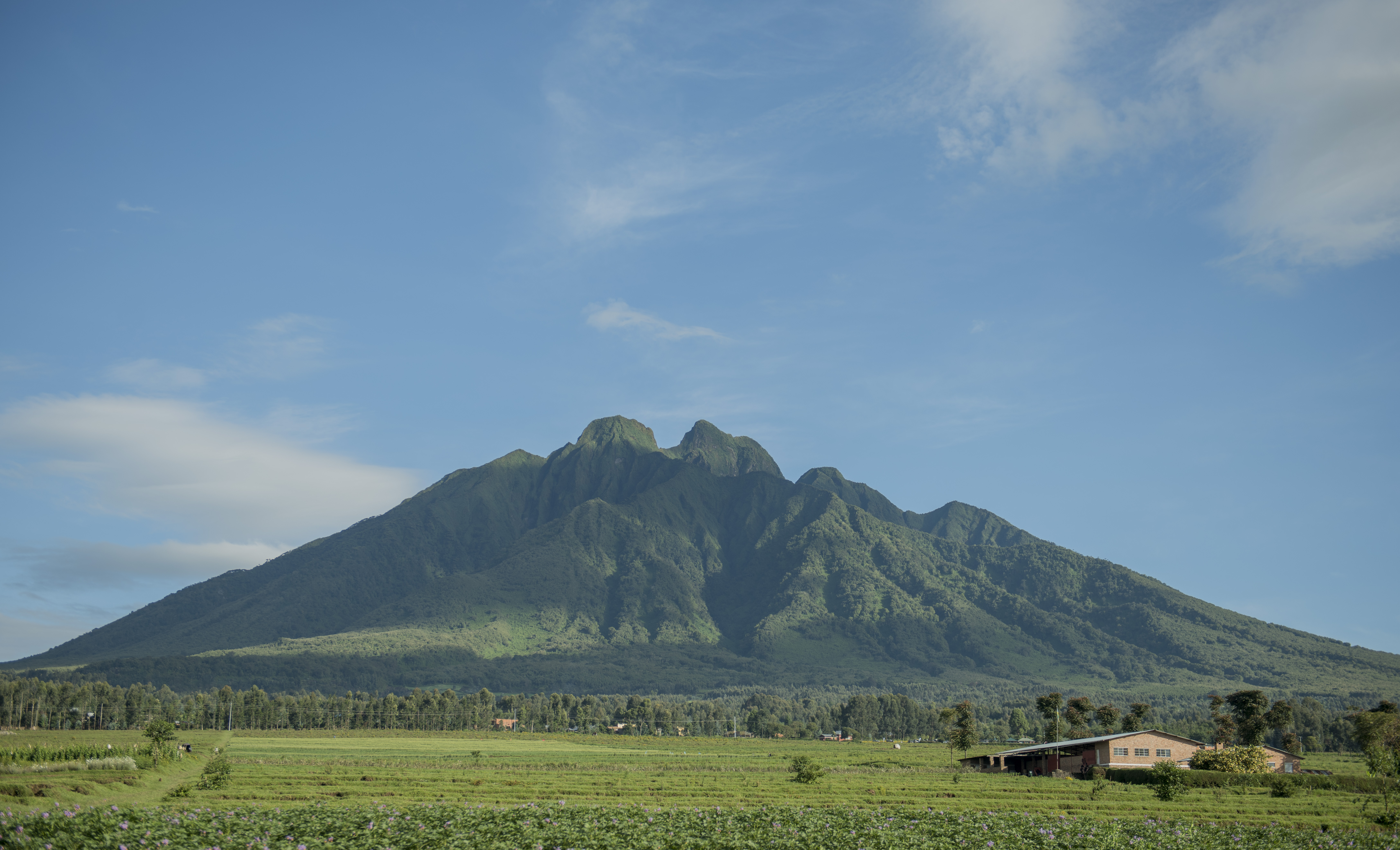
- Mount Sabyinyo

Highest point
- Elevation: 3,669 m (12,037 ft)
- Prominence: 1,046 m (3,432 ft)
- Listing: Ribu
- Coordinates: 01°24′S 29°36′E

Geography
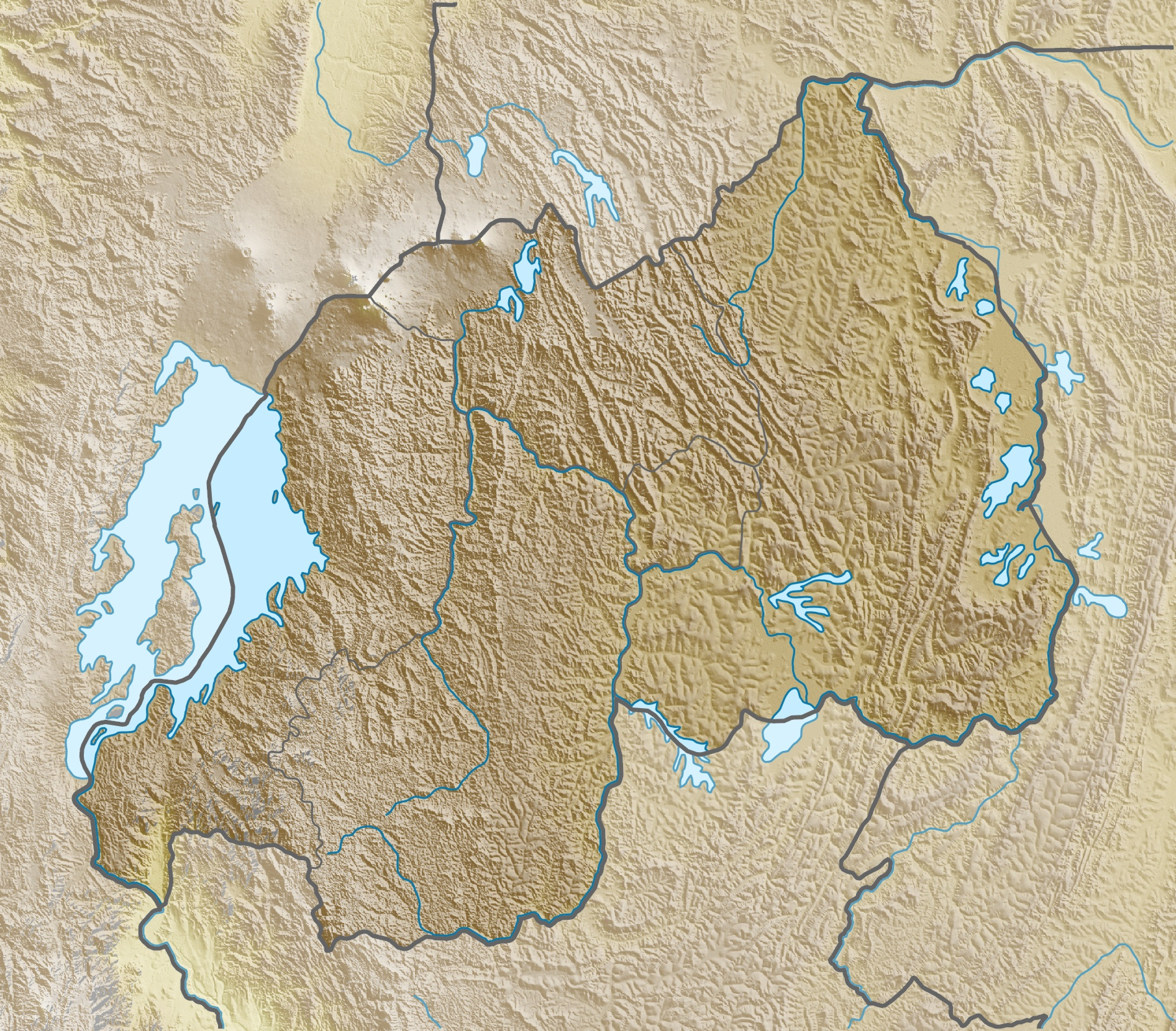
- Location within Rwanda Location within Uganda
- Location: Democratic Republic of the Congo–Rwanda–Uganda
- Parent range: Virunga Mountains

Geology
- Mountain type: Stratovolcano
- Last eruption: Pleistocene

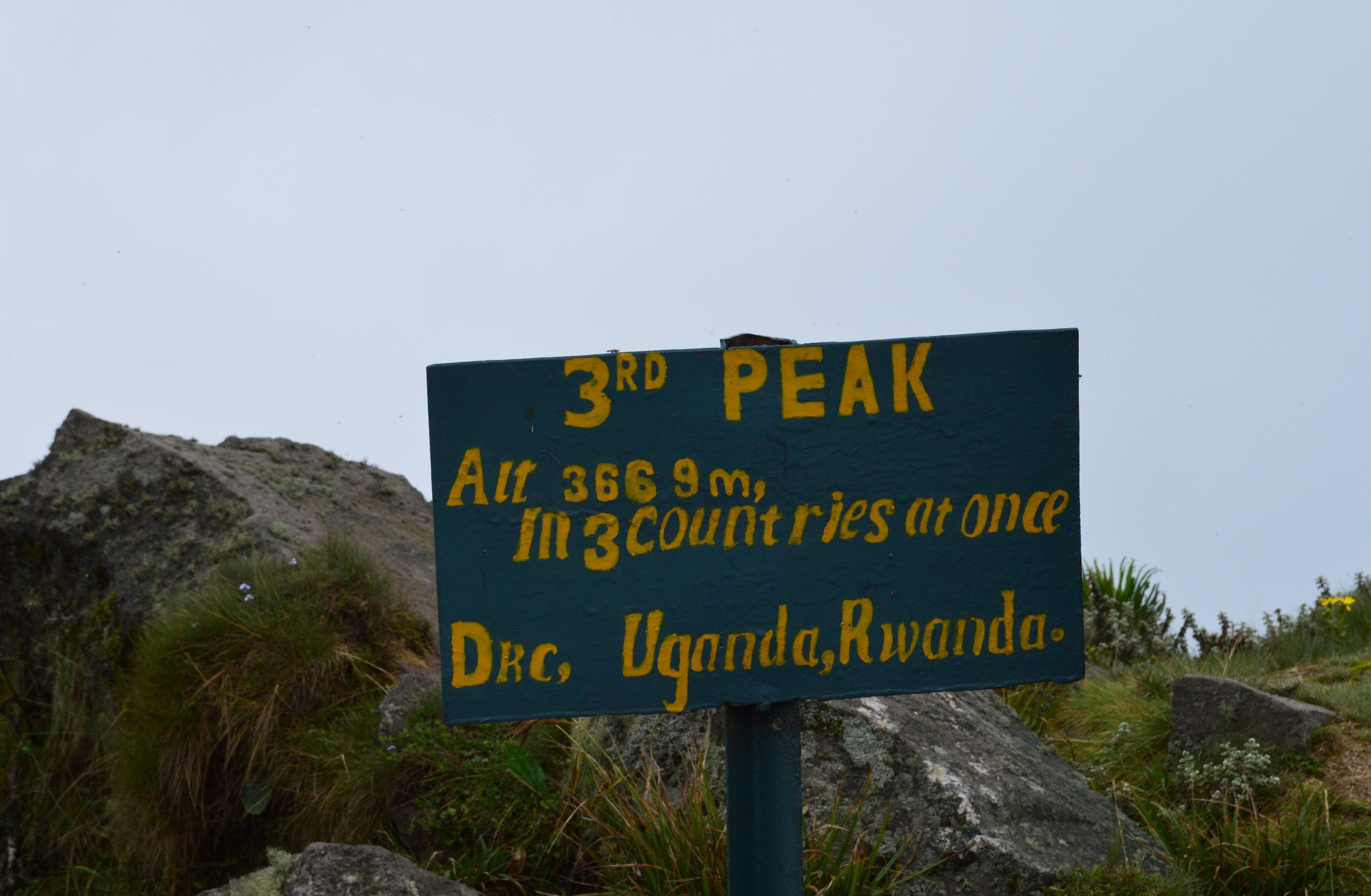
The sign marking the border tripoint at the summit of Mount Sabyinyo.

Mount Sabyinyo ("Sabyinyo" is derived from the Kinyarwanda word "Iryinyo", meaning "tooth"; also "Sabyinyo, Sabyinio") is an extinct volcano in eastern Africa in the Virunga Mountains. Mount Sabyinyo is the oldest volcano of the range. It is north-east of Lake Kivu, one of the African Great Lakes, and west of Lake Bunyonyi in Uganda. The summit of the mountain, at 3,669 metres (12,037 ft), marks the intersection of the borders of the Democratic Republic of the Congo (DRC), Rwanda, and Uganda, and holds religious significance for local tribes. It also is within the adjoining national parks established by these countries: Virunga National Park in the DRC, the Volcanoes National Park in Rwanda, and Mgahinga Gorilla National Park in Uganda.

The slopes of Mount Sabyinyo are a habitat for the critically endangered mountain gorilla. The mountain carries the local nickname "Old Man's Teeth," because its serrated summit resembles worn teeth in a gum line (in contrast to the perfect conical summits of the adjacent mountains in this range).

The peaks of Mount Sabyinyo can be easily done and accessed and trekked along the foothills from the side of Mgahinga National park in Uganda.
