= Lake Bunyonyi =

Lake in Uganda

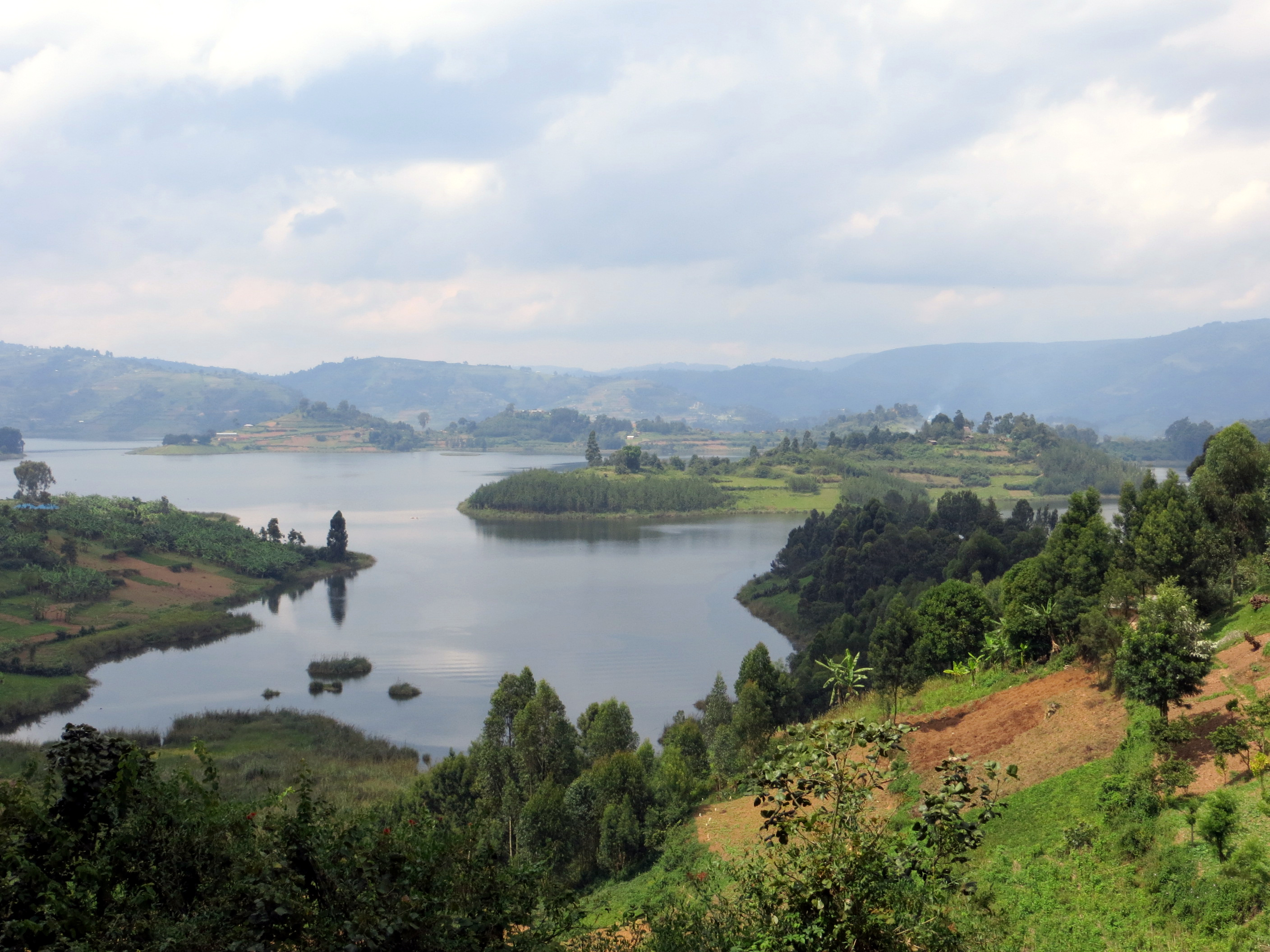

- Location within Uganda
- Location: South-western Uganda
- Coordinates: 1°17′S 29°55′E
- Type: fresh water
- Basin countries: Uganda
- Max. length: 25 km (16 mi)
- Max. width: 7 km (4.3 mi)
- Surface area: 46 km^{2} (18 sq mi)
- Average depth: 39 m (128 ft)
- Max. depth: 40 m (130 ft) (sometimes claimed to be much deeper, see text)
- Shore length^{1}: 186 km (116 mi)
- Surface elevation: 1,962 m (6,437 ft)
- ^{1} Shore length is not a well-defined measure.

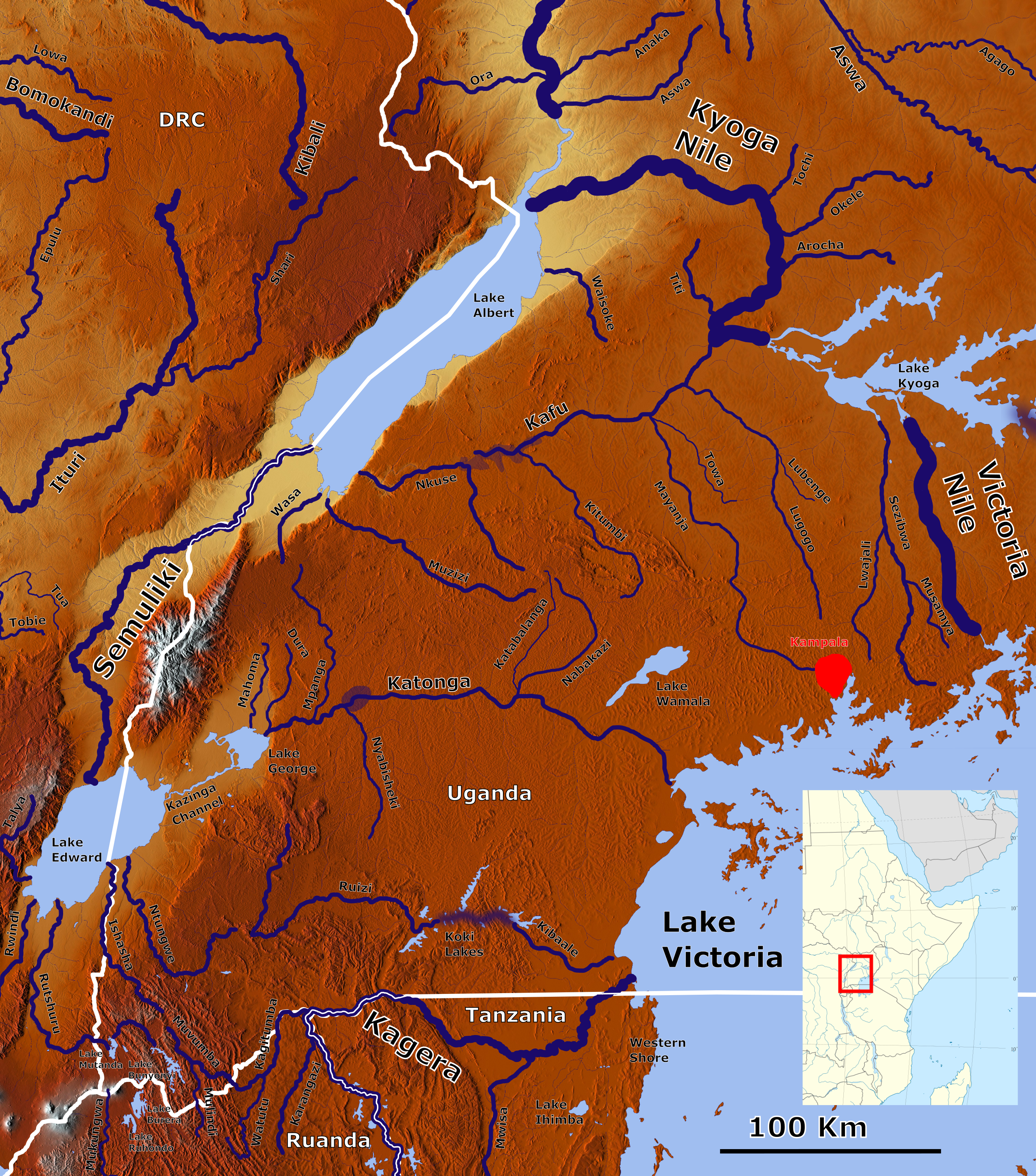
Rivers and lakes of south west Uganda. Bunyonyi is the largest of the lakes in the far south western tip of Uganda, just opposite the (on this map) similar-sized Lake Burera in Rwanda.

Lake Bunyonyi ("Place of many little birds") is in south-western Uganda between Kisoro and Kabale, close to the border with Rwanda. The lake appeared from 2004 to 2009 on the USh 5,000/= note under the title "Lake Bunyonyi and terraces". Scientific literature generally quotes a maximum depth of 40 m (130 ft), but some tourist guides and locals insist that it is much deeper, about 900 m (3,000 ft), which would make it the second-deepest lake in Africa.

Towns on its shores include Kyevu and Muko, while its 29 islands include Punishment Island and Bushara Island.

== Geography ==
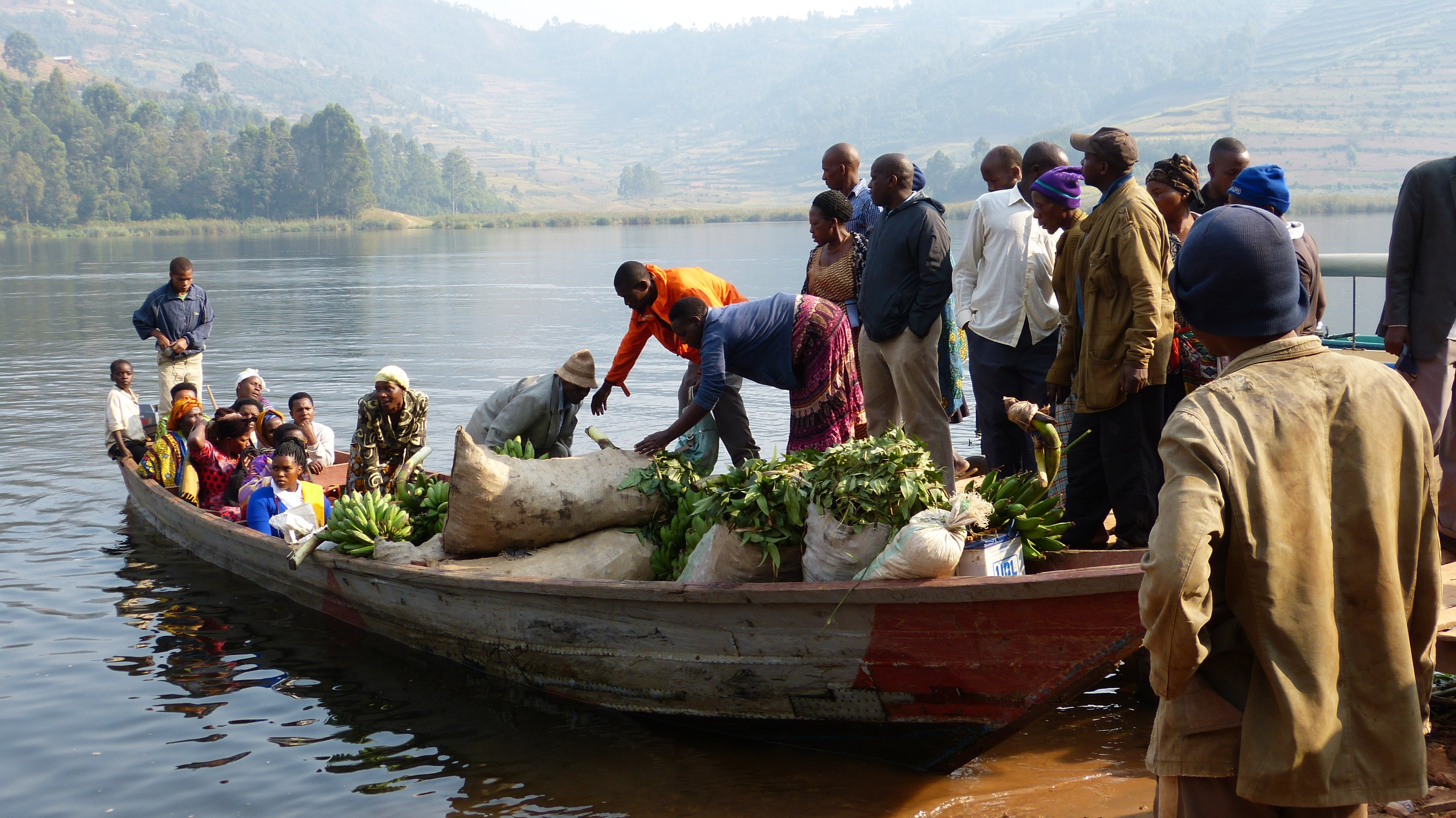
Market day at lake Bunyonyi

Lake Bunyonyi is a body of water in Kabale District and about 7 kilometres (4.3 mi) west of Kabale town. It is the largest and highest of the three small lakes (the others being Lake Mutanda and Lake Mulehe) in the Kigezi highlands that are part of the Nile basin.

The lake was formed about 18,000 years ago by a volcanic eruption blocking a valley in the Rukiga mountains near the present day village of Muko on the north-west tip of the lake. The lake's current outlet is a small stream also in Muko which flows into the Ruvuma swamp (this in turn flows into the Ruhezaminda river that ends at Lake Mutanda). The lake is about 22 km long and 6 km at its widest and at a height of about 1973 m. It is surrounded by mountains that reach heights of 600 m above the lake.

== Main islands ==
=== Akampene (Punishment Island) ===
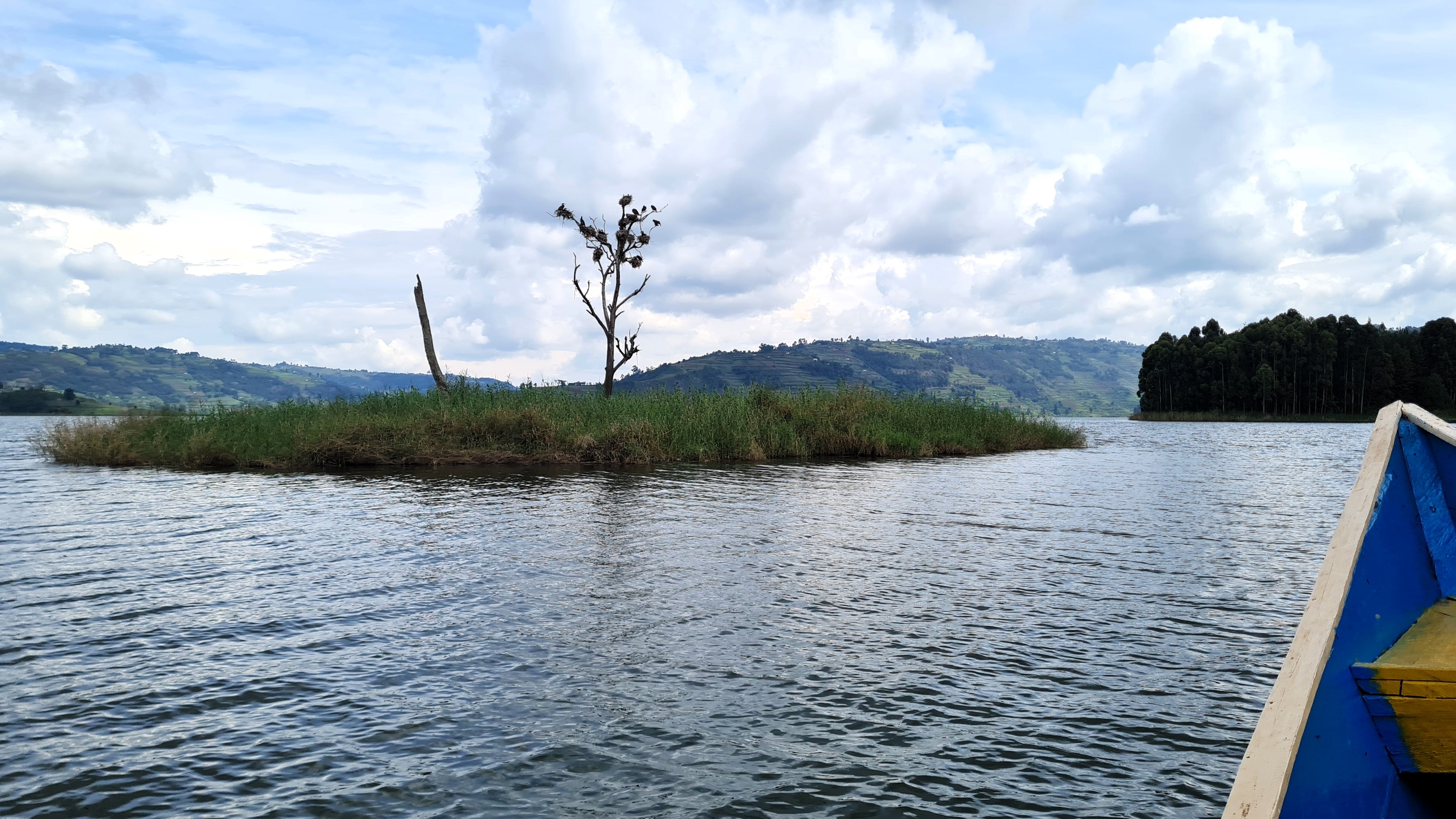
Punishment Island in Lake Bunyonyi

The Bakiga used to leave unmarried pregnant girls on this small island - to die of hunger or while trying to swim to the mainland (swimming skills were rare). This was to intimidate the rest, to show them not to do the same. A man without cows to pay the bride price could go to the island and pick up a girl. The practice got abandoned in the first half of the 20th century.

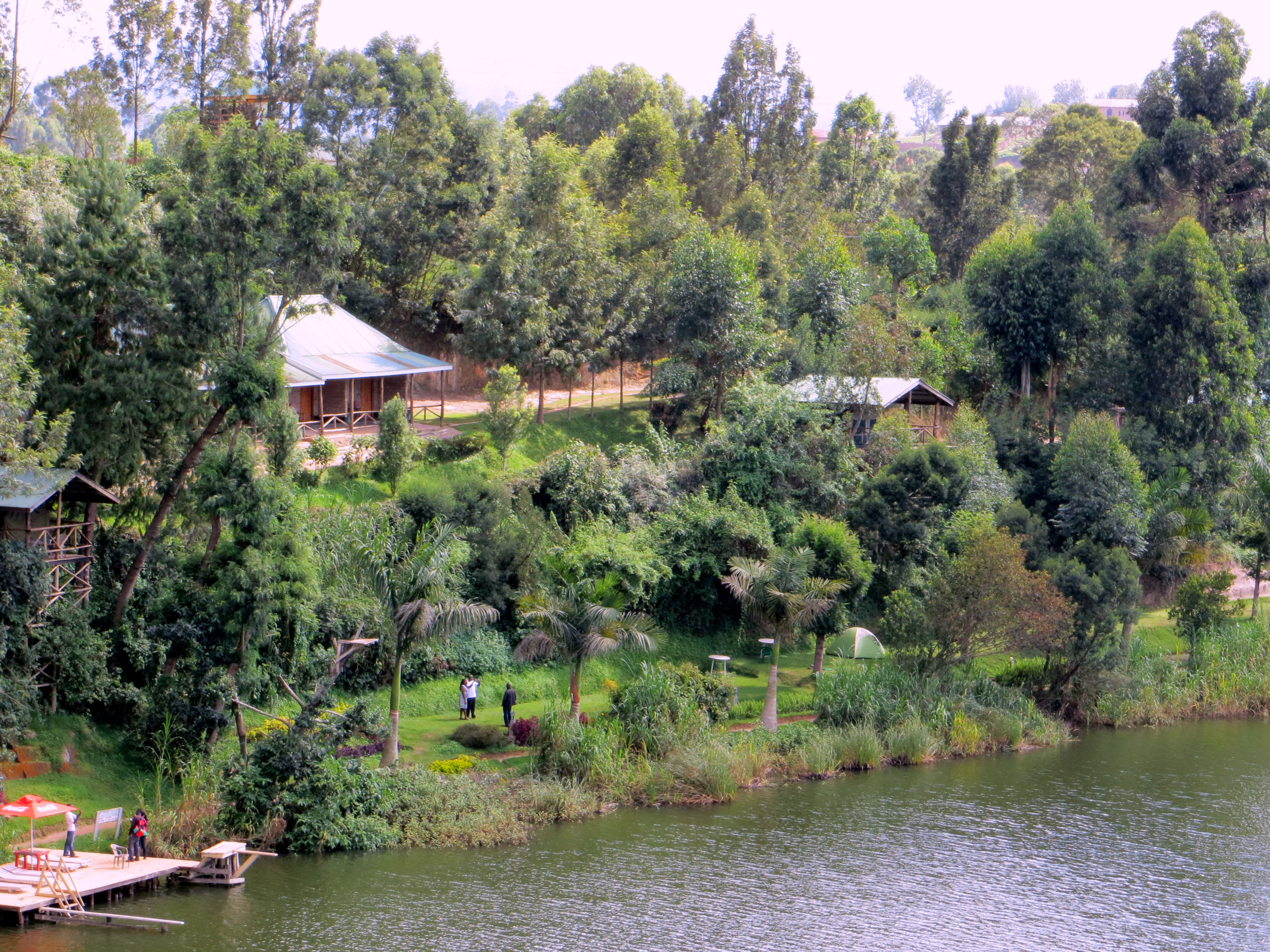
Camp on the shore of Lake Bunyonyi

=== Bwama and Njuyeera (Sharp's Island) ===
In 1921, English missionary Leonard Sharp came to this part of Uganda and in 1931 established a leprosy treatment centre on the then uninhabited Bwama island. A church, patient quarters (model villages), and a medical facility were built, while Sharp settled on Njuyeera Island (probably meaning "white cottage" after the similarity of the doctor's small white house to Sharp's father's house in Shanklin, now The White House Hotel). The rationale of the leprosy colony was that of "voluntary segregation'", where the provision of a happy community to live in would attract leprosy sufferers, so removing them from the communities where they might infect others.

== Ecology ==
Except for water birds, few aquatic animal species are naturally present in this isolated highland lake. Its water is highly stratified with the oxygen limit placed at a depth of about 7 m (23 ft).

Native vertebrates include the De Witte's clawed frog, Lake Victoria clawed frog ("bunyoniensis" form), African clawless otter and spotted-necked otter, but only the first frog is still common in the lake. Four endemic species of Caridina shrimp are found in the lake; there are indications that they might also occur in Lake Mutanda. Originally, there were no fish or crayfish in the lake, but the catfish Clarias liocephalus, Nile tilapia, Singida tilapia, haplochromine cichlids of Lake Victoria origin and red swamp crayfish have been introduced.

Aquatic vegetation is locally abundant and include species such as papyrus, swamp sawgrass (subspecies jamaicense) and blue lotus.

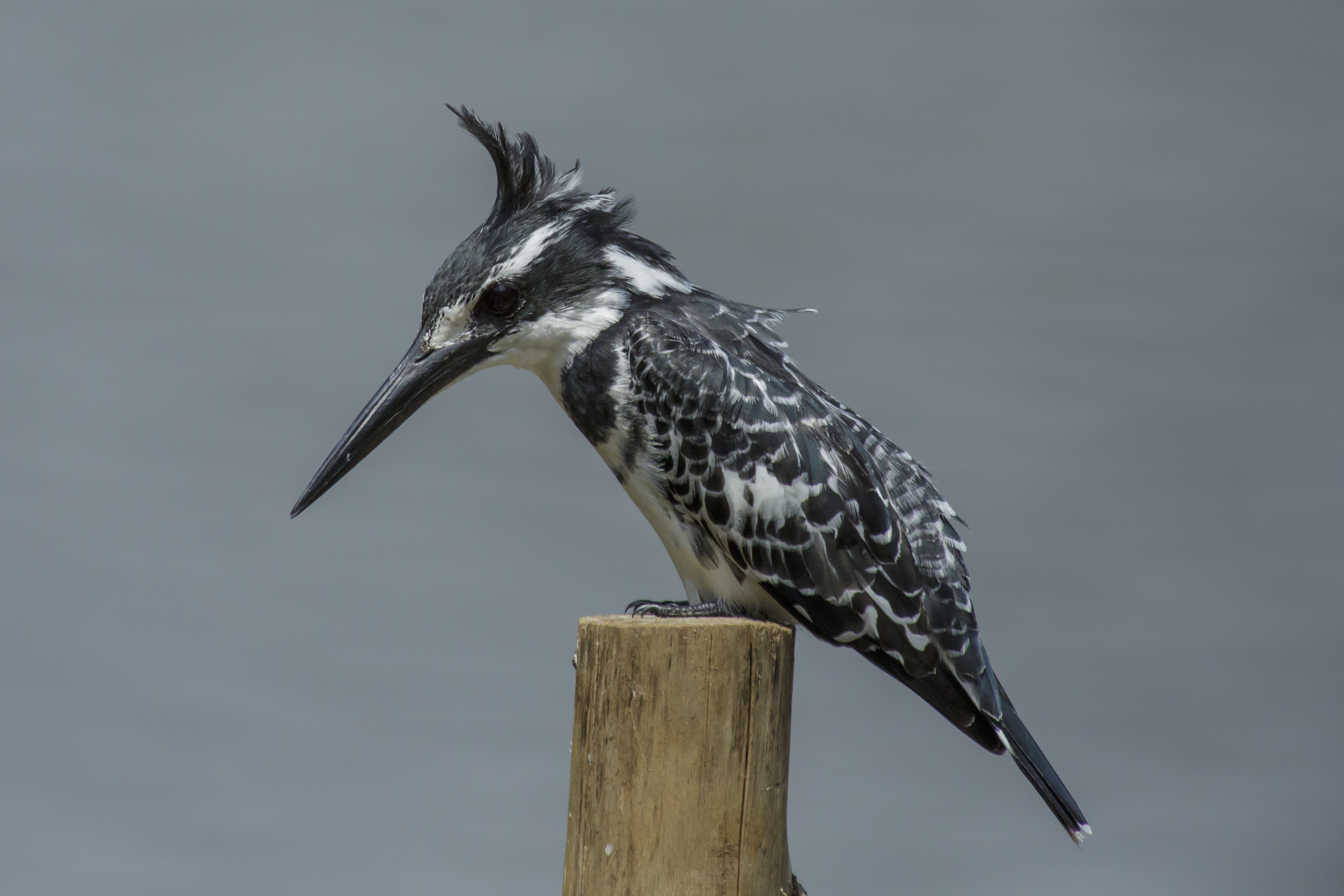
Pied kingfisher (Ceryle rudis) - Lake Bunyonyi

== Tourism ==
Lake Bunyonyi is popular for its green and lush terraced hills that are punctuated with a plethora of over 200 bird species. The place combines the art of water birds and some migratory birds. This makes it a perfect ideal for many bird enthusiasts. A dive into the Nyombi swamp reveals a variety of assorted birds. Apart from birdwatching, the place also presents other opportunities. These include sports like swimming as well as boat cruising and riding. The area is also underlined by various hikes and nature walks, all of which offer more than just nature and pleasure. A sense of traditional culture is also felt during the community walks, since one can get stopovers at the Bakiga Cultural museum as well as the blacksmith sites. For more cultural adventures, one can visit the village of Bufuka for Batwa and Bakiga experiences.

== Sources ==
- UNEMA (2009), Uganda: Atlas of our Changing Environment (PDF), Uganda National Environment Management Authority, p. 94
- Visser, S.A. (1962), "Chemical Investigations into a System of Lakes, Rivers and Swamps in S.W. Kigezi, Uganda", East African Agricultural and Forestry Journal, 28 (2): 81–86, doi:10.1080/00128325.1962.11661848
