= Kanungu District =

- District
- District location in Uganda
- Coordinates: 00°57′S 29°47′E
- Country: Uganda
- Region: Western Region
- Sub-region: Kigezi sub-region
- Established: 1 July 2001
- Capital: Kanungu

Area
  - Total: 1,274 km^{2} (492 sq mi)

Population (2012 Estimate)
  - Total: 252,100
  - Density: 197.9/km^{2} (513/sq mi)
- Time zone: UTC+3 (EAT)
- Website: www.kanungu.go.ug

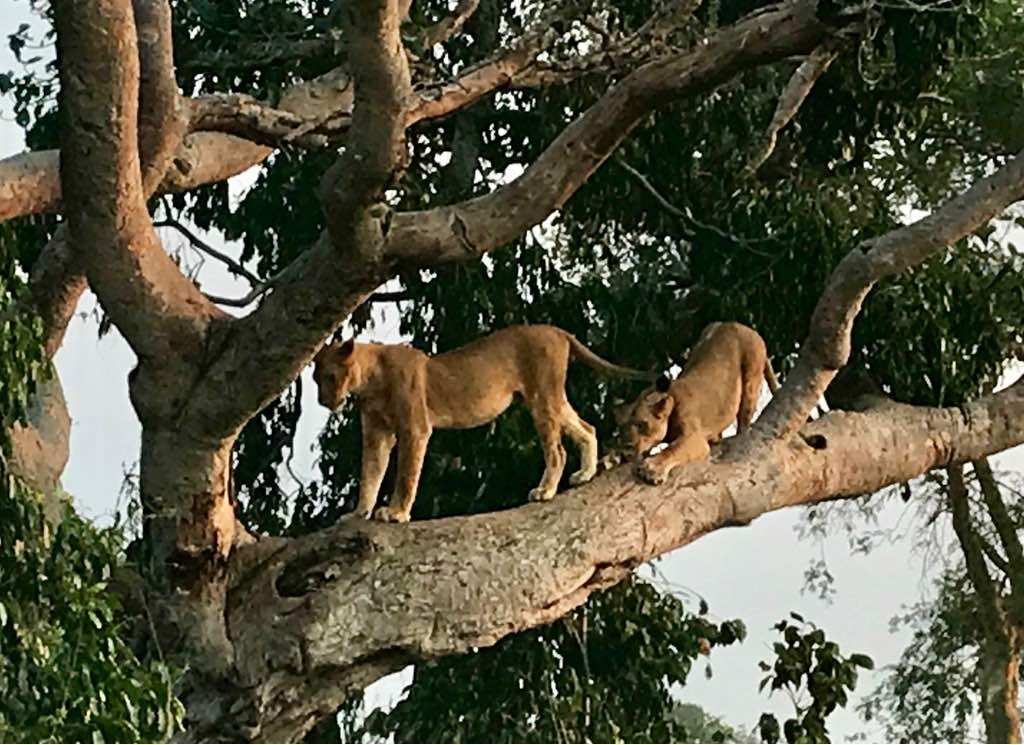
Tree-climbing lions in Ishasha in Kanungu District

Kanungu District is a district in the Western Region of Uganda. The town of Kanungu is the site of the district headquarters.

== Location ==
Kanungu District is bordered by Rukungiri District to the north and east, Kabale District to the south-east, Kisoro District to the south-west, and the Democratic Republic of the Congo to the west. The district headquarters are approximately 60 kilometres (37 mi), by road, north-west of Kabale, the largest town in the sub-region. This location is approximately 420 kilometres (260 mi), by road, south-west of Kampala, Uganda's capital and largest city. The central coordinates of the district are: 00°57'S, 29°47'E.

== Overview ==
Kanungu District was created by the sixth Parliament of Uganda in July 2001. The district comprises two counties: Kinkiizi East and Kinkiizi west with the twelve sub-counties of Kihihi, Kambuga, Nyamirama, Rugyeyo, Rutenga, Kayonza, Mpungu, Kinaaba, Katetete, Nyakinoni, Nyanga, and Kanyantorogo, and the four town councils of Kanungu, Kihihi, Butogota, and Kambuga.

The district has a distributed feeder road network and community access roads. There are three airstrips: Kayonza Tea Factory, Savannah Airstrip near Kihihi, and the Ishasha River Camp Airport in the Ishasha Sector of Queen Elizabeth National Park.

The charitable organisation CHIFCOD operates schools, colleges, and health centres in the district.

Mass murder and suicides were committed at several sites in the district by the Movement for the Restoration of the Ten Commandments of God cult in 2000.

== Population ==
In 1991, the national population census estimated the district population at 160,700. The 2002 national census estimated the population at 204,700. The annual population growth rate for the district was calculated at 2.1 percent. It has been estimated that the population in 2012 was 252,100.

The district is served by one district hospital, Kambuga Hospital located in the Kambuga Town Council. The Bwindi Community Hospital, operated by a non-governmental organization, is located at the outskirts of the Bwindi Impenetrable Forest. The district has two Health Centre IVs, one located in Kanungu Town Council, Kanungu HCIV and the other one in Kihiihi Town Council Kihiihi HCIV, and ten government Health Centre IIIs at the sub-county level.

== Religious affiliations ==
In September 2002, residents of the district self-reported their religious affiliations as follows: Christianity 95.3 percent, Islam 2.7 percent, Other 1.7 percent, and None 0.3 percent.

== Economic activities ==
Agriculture is the mainstay of the district's economy, as is the case with the majority of other Ugandan districts. The fertile soils and good climate allow for adequate produce for home consumption and surpluses that are sold. However, because of the remoteness of the district and the mountainous terrain, bringing the produce to market remains a challenge and a constraint to increased production.

Many people in the district keep livestock on a subsistence level, primarily for milk production. Milk is part of the local diet and is a requirement for almost every household. But few people keep cattle in large numbers since the people here are traditionally agriculturalists.

Crops grown in the district include:

- tobacco
- bananas
- matooke
- maize
- beans
- peas
- rice
- potatoes
- coffee
- tea
- sorghum
- cassava
- sweet potatoes

The Kayonza Tea Factory and the Kigezi Development Tea Factories, one in Butogota Town Council and the other in Rugyeyo Subcounty, purchase and process the tea grown locally. The CHIFCOD Coffee Factory supports 1,000 farmers, training them to create high-value produce then processing and exporting it. The high altitude and fertile soils allow production of temperate fruits like grapes, apples, and pears.

The district also receives revenue from the tourism sector as a majority of the world's population of mountain gorillas are harboured in the Bwindi Impenetrable National Park.

The Kanungu Hydroelectric Power Station, which is just downstream of Bwindi, provides electricity to the Kanungu district.

== In popular culture ==
The Bwindi Impenetrable Forest in Kanungu District is among the sites shown in aerial footage in the movie Black Panther.

== Livestock ==
- Chicken
- Cattle
- Pigs
- Goat
- Sheep

== See also ==
- Districts of Uganda
- Parliament of Uganda
- Western Region, Uganda
