= Kanungu =

Ugandan town

Kanungu Kanungu Town Council
- Location in Uganda
- Coordinates: 00°53′49″S 29°46′32″E
- Country: Uganda
- Region: Western Region
- Sub-region: Kigezi sub-region
- District: Kanungu District
- Elevation: 5,515 ft (1,681 m)

Population (2014 Census)
  - Total: 15,056
- Climate: Aw

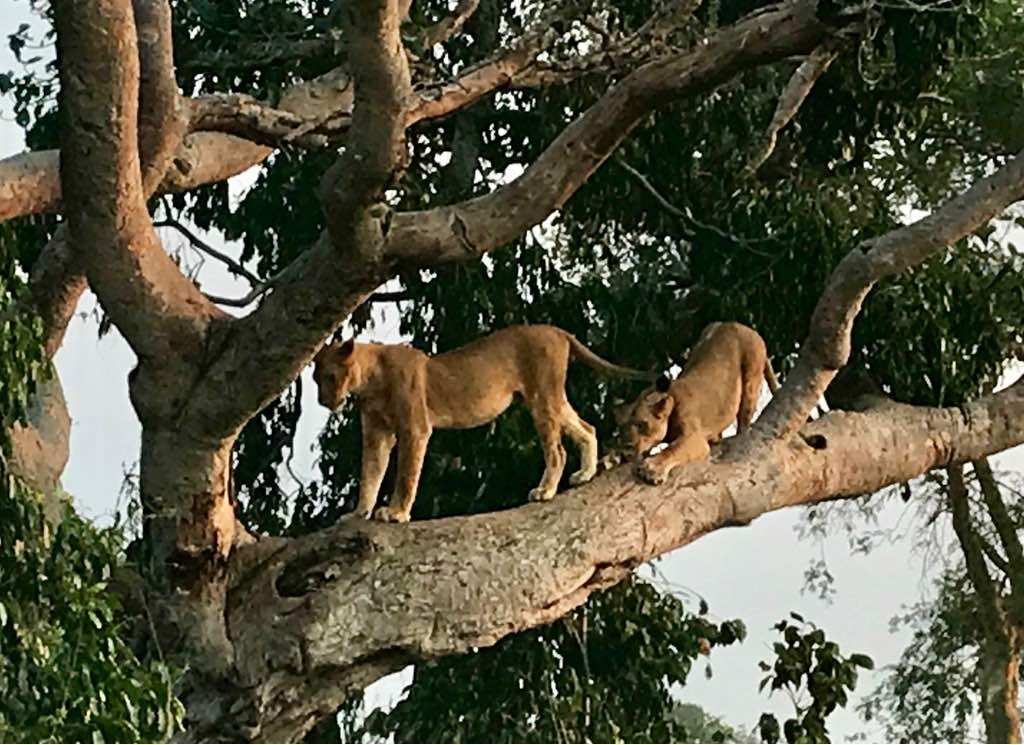
Climbing Lions in Ishasha in Kanungu District.

Kanungu is a town in the Western Region of Uganda. It is the location of the district headquarters for Kanungu District.

== Location ==
Kanungu is located approximately 43 kilometres (27 mi), on a winding dirt road, southwest of the town of Rukungiri, the nearest large town. This location is approximately 404 kilometres (251 mi), by road, southwest of Kampala, the capital and largest city of Uganda. The coordinates of the town are 0°53'49.0"S, 29°46'32.0"E (Latitude:-0.896950; Longitude:29.775556). Kanungu Town sits at an average elevation of 1,681 metres (5,515 ft), above sea level.

== Population ==
The 2014 national population census enumerated the population of Kanungu town at 15,056 inhabitants, with a projected population of 16,300 in July 2019.

== Points of interest ==
The following additional points of interest lie within Kanungu or near its borders: (a) the offices of Kanungu Town Council (b) Kanungu central market (c) a branch of PostBank Uganda (d) Kanungu Power Station, a 6.6 megawatt hydroelectric power station, also referred to as the "Ishasha Power Station".

Kanungu Town Council is connected to the national electricity grid, and is serviced by National Water and Sewerage Corporation.

== Challenges ==
Some of the challenges that the town faces, include poor sanitation and insufficient number of public trash bins. The town also lacks sufficient number of public toilets. The few that are available are described as "very dirty". Domestic animals, including cows and goats are allowed to wander freely in town. Other concerns include the absence of street lights and noise pollution.

== Notable residents ==
- Yvonne Mpambara, lawyer.

== See also ==
- Kigezi
- List of cities and towns in Uganda
- Rukungiri–Kihihi–Ishasha–Kanungu Road
