= Kisoro District =

- District
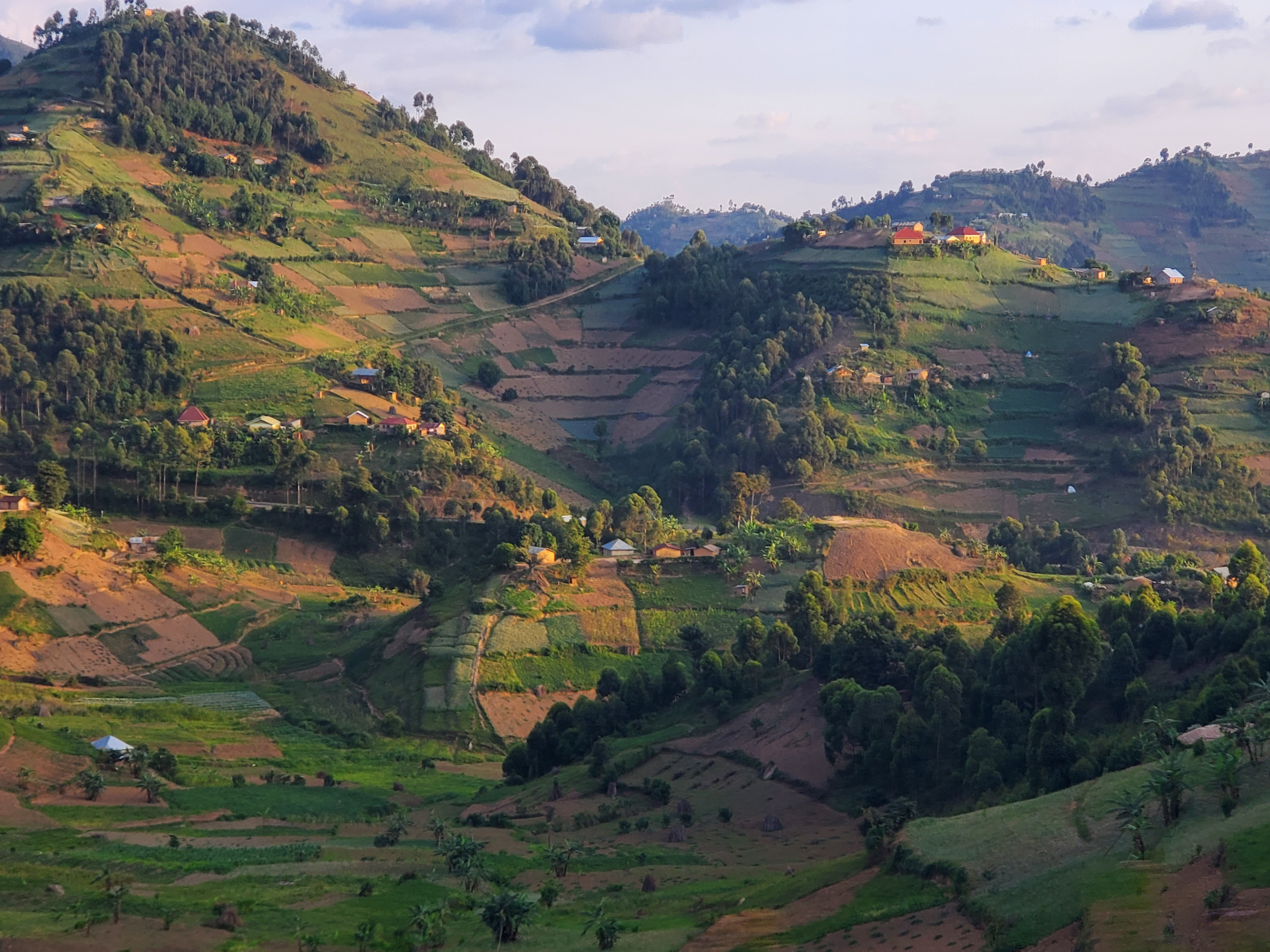
- Hills in Kisoro

- District location in Uganda
- Coordinates: 01°17′S 29°41′E
- Country: Uganda
- Region: Western Region
- Sub-region: Kigezi sub-region
- Established: 1 July 1991
- Capital: Kisoro

Area
  - Total: 728 km^{2} (281 sq mi)
  - Land: 644.6 km^{2} (248.9 sq mi)
  - Water: 56.8 km^{2} (21.9 sq mi)

Population (2014 census)
  - Total: 281,705
  - Density: 425.5/km^{2} (1,102/sq mi)
- Time zone: UTC+3 (EAT)
- Website: www.kisoro.go.ug

Kisoro District is a district in the Western Region of Uganda. The town of Kisoro is the site of the district headquarters.

== Location ==
Kisoro District is bordered by Kanungu District to the north, Kabale District to the east, Rwanda to the south, and the Democratic Republic of the Congo to the west. The town of Kisoro is approximately 45 kilometres (28 mi), by road, west of Kabale, the largest town in the sub-region.

== Population ==
In 1991, the national population census estimated the district population at 186,870. The population was estimated at 220,300 during the 2002 national census. In 2012, the population was estimated at 254,300. The national population census on 27 August 2014, enumerated the district's population at 281,705 people.

According to the 2024 national population census, the district had an estimated population of 463,622 (251,631 males and 182,031 females). Since the same report shows that the total number of Bafumbira people is 949,860, it means that more than half are living in other districts across Uganda, mostly in Kampala, Mubende, Kamwenge, and many others.

== Religion ==
As of September 2002, the religious affiliations of the district residents was as follows: Christianity – 95.8 percent, Islam – 0.8 percent, other – 1.3 percent, none – 2.2 percent.

== Tourist attractions ==
Bwindi Impenetrable Forest National Park is one of only four national parks in the world where the African mountain gorilla can be observed in the wild.

Mgahinga Gorilla National Park has mountain gorillas and covers three of the eight Virunga Volcanoes (Muhabura, Gahinga, and Sabyinyo), all of which lie on the Uganda–Rwanda border.

== Education ==
Kisoro Municipality includes Metropolitan International University, a secular, private educational institution.

== Economic activity ==
- Irish potatoes
- Bananas
- Beans
- Peas
- Cabbage

== Livestock ==
- Cattle
- Goat
- Sheep
- Pigs
- Chicken

== See also ==
1. Kisoro
2. Western Region, Uganda
3. Districts of Uganda
