= Ishasha River =

River in Uganda and Democratic Republic of the Congo

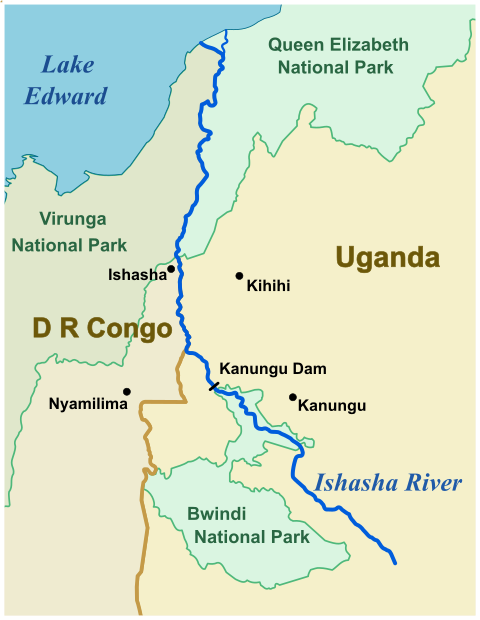
- Course of the Ishasha River

- Location within Uganda

Location
- Countries: Uganda; Democratic Republic of the Congo

Physical characteristics
- Source
  - location: Kabale District
  - elevation: 6020 ft
- Mouth
  - location: Lake Edward
  - coordinates
  - elevation: 2995 ft
- Length: 100 km (62 mi)

The Ishasha River is a river in southwest Uganda, forming part of the border with the Democratic Republic of the Congo. It runs from its source north of Kabale to its mouth at Lake Edward. Its length is very roughly 100 kilometres (62 mi) ignoring the many small meanders.

== Description ==
The river arises from drainage channels in farmland some 20 kilometres (12 mi) northwest of Kabale. It runs northwest through mountain valleys to its entrance into the northern lobe of Bwindi Impenetrable National Park. From there, it continues northwest under the heavy forest canopy to the Kanungu dam, part of the Kanungu Hydroelectric Power Station, also known as the Ishasha Power Station.

Leaving the power station, it meanders northwest through hilly terrain until it joins and becomes part of the Uganda-Democratic Republic of the Congo (DRC) border. After turning north, it continues past the DRC town of Ishasha at the southern tip of Queen Elizabeth National Park (QENP). It remains the western border of QENP until it enters the marshlands on the shore of Lake Edward.

== Location ==
Point	Coordinates (links to map & photo sources)	Notes
Kabale District source	1.09°S 29.89°E	Elevation: 6020 ft
Entering Bwindi Impenetrable Forest	0.956°S 29.778°E	Elev: 4987 ft
Kanungu power station	0.872°S 29.665°E	Elev: 3554 ft
Uganda-DRC border	0.834°S 29.639°E	Elev: 3432 ft
Ishasha town	0.735°S 29.630°E	Elev: 3285 ft
Lake Edward mouth	0.445°S 29.686°E	Elev: 2995 ft

== See also ==
- List of rivers of Uganda
- List of rivers of the Democratic Republic of the Congo
