= Katuna =

Gatuna Katuna
- Town
- Location within Uganda
- Coordinates: 1.42282°S 30.01064°E
- Country: Uganda
- Region: Western Uganda
- Sub-region: Kigezi sub-region
- District: Kabale District
- Elevation: 1,825 m (5,988 ft)
- Climate: Cwb

Katuna is a town in the Kabale District of Uganda at the border with Rwanda. The town is also called "Gatuna" in the Kinyarwanda language.

== Location ==
Katuna is located on the Ugandan border with Rwanda, in extreme southwestern Uganda. The town is located in Kamuganguzi Sub-region, Ndorwa County. This is approximately 28 kilometres (17 mi), by road, south of Kabale, the largest city in the sub-region. The coordinates of the town are:1°25'22.0"S, 30°00'39.0"E (Latitude:-1.422778; Longitude:30.010833).

== Overview ==
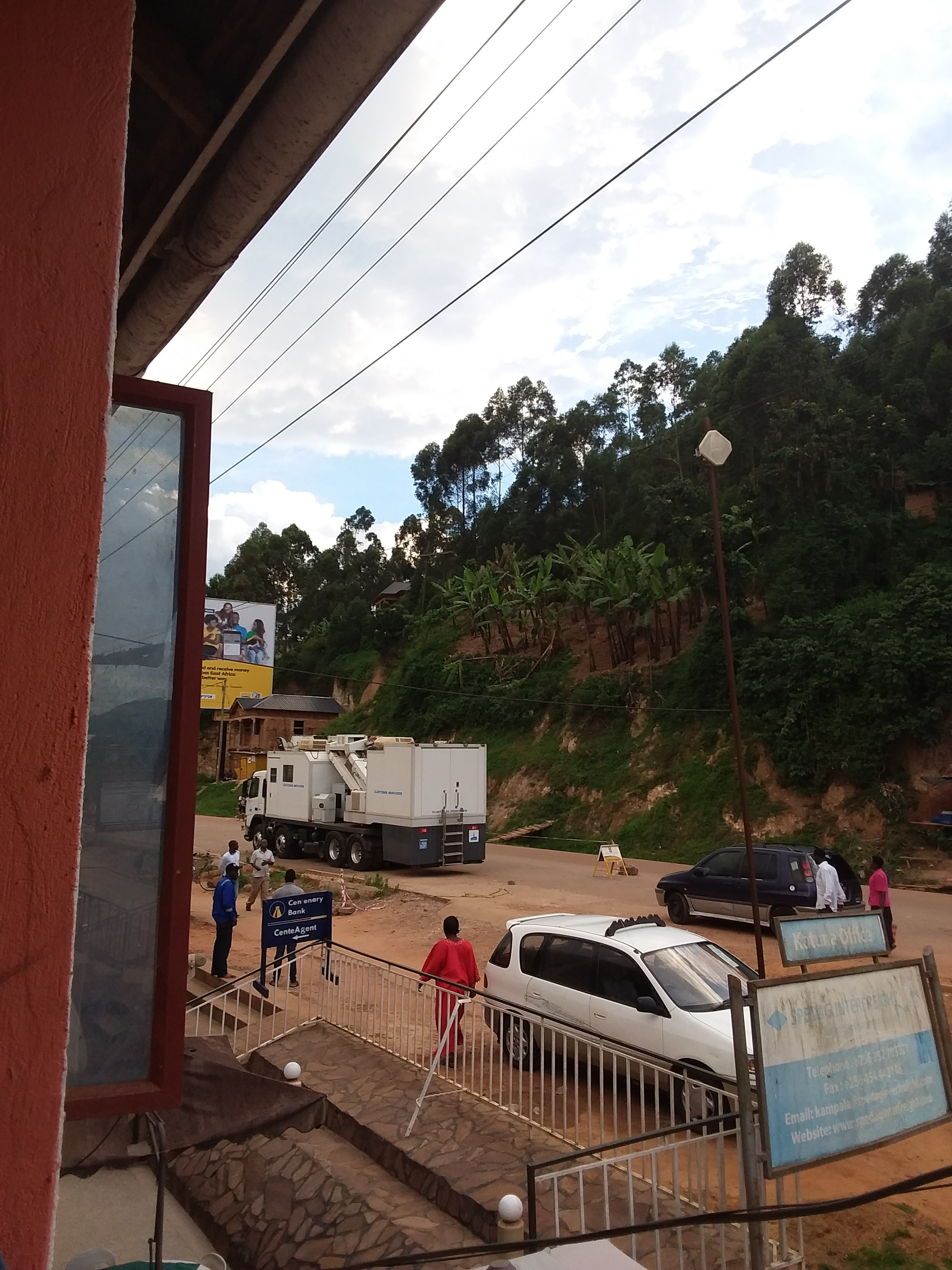
Katuna border.

Katuna is a major entrance point to Rwanda and handles most of Rwanda's imports from and exports to Uganda. Most goods bound for Rwanda from the Kenyan port of Mombasa pass through Katuna. Because of increased commercial and tourist traffic, Katuna is a fast-growing town. The border at Katuna is open 24 hours a day.

== History ==
In the pre-colonial times Katuna was a very important place. Around 1600 AD, the first Bakiga (named after their ancestor Kashyiga) arrived from Rwanda, came to the hills of Kagarama and Rwanyena, fearing to cross the big lake which they named Bunyonyi, (so big that small birds could not cross it), they discovered a shorter route along the plains where there was a tree under which they rested, played and prayed, giving thanks to their ancestors before they could proceed to the hills. They called the place Gatuna for a meeting place.

However, some fellow Rwandan immigrants who came following their relatives lost their way and went to Rubaya. That time, they migrated from Rwanda in places like Byumba, Murindi, Ruhengyere, Mukaniga and Buganza (especially from the Bumbogo Kingdom) in search of fertile land and to escape natural hazards and internal political conflicts. When Chief Rubunga was sending envoys to Mpororo, it is at Gatuna under the command of the now called the Abagyesera and Abasigi clans that the first group disobeyed and went towards Ankore. This was the beginning of the decentralization of the Rukiga Kingdom. From that time, different clans were formed, no longer heeding allegiance to the Main Chief. Rubunga belonged to the Bamuhutu ruling as a Mungura. Till today, there's still a dispute among the Bakiga who was their real King. However, many legends hold that, due to fear of the brutality of the Abungura who mistreated most of the Bakiga, after the death of Rubunga, the Bakiga formed Abakuru b’Ekika (elders of homesteads) but feared to ask the Abungura to give them Umwami or Omukama.

Thereafter they elected abakuru b’emidyango (elders of clans) who were representatives but since these had to refer to one elder, which idea they did not like, the whole of Kiga Kingdom collapsed. The colonialist benefited this situation by forming one big political district called Kigezi. Today, Gatuna is still largely occupied by the Abasigi, Abagyesera and the Abungura sub-clans.

== Population ==
As of June 2012, the population of Katuna, Uganda was estimated at 1,300.

== Geography ==
Until 1926 Katuna was located in the then Belgian Rwanda. It was the major exit point for political deserters who came to settle in Uganda. Katuna became a part of the then British Uganda after the demarcation of the Uganda-Rwanda border in 1926, based on an agreement between the British and Belgian governments. This was the last part to become part of Uganda.

Rubaya

Rubaya Subcounty is the wheat-growing area in the region. 70% of people who live Katuna, trace their ancestry to Rwanda. They are believed to have come from parts of Rwanda such as Murindi, Byumba, Ruhengyere and Mukaniga. Others trace their Rwandan roots through marriage between Rwandan women and Ugandans.

Kamuganguzi

Kamuganguzi on the other hand, is along the main road to Kigali and the inhabitants are believed to be more sociable compared to those in Rubaya.

== Native sons and daughters ==
Several important people who have steered or are steering the development of the area in Uganda and others working for international organizations or institutions trace their ancestry to the Gatuna area. Because of the enterprising spirit of the people of Katuna, many of them work in the private sector. These sons and daughters include:

- Abel Rwendeire
- Abaruhanga Amos
- Adrian Ndemere
- Amos Nzeyi
- Andrew Aja Baryayanga
- Anne Kansiime
- Augustine Rukiika Bujara
- Augustus Nuwagaba
- Benjamin Turyahikayo
- Callist Rubaramira
- Charles Kwesiga
- Charles Mbire
- David Bahati
- David Tibemanya
- Edmand Tumushabe
- Elinasani Bisamunyu
- Ezra Suruma
- Festo Karwemera
- Francis Runumi
- Frank Ntaho
- Gaetano Batanyenda
- George Bagamuhunda
- George Katwesigye
- George W. Kanyeihamba
- Henry Banyenzaki
- Isaac Kawonawo
- Ivan Mbabazi Batuma
- Jack Sabiiti
- Jimmy Twebaze
- Joy Kwesiga
- Namanya Paddy
- Perez Ahabwe
- Peter Kazenga Tibenderana
- Peter Niwagaba
- Pius Ruhemurana
- Placid Mihayo
- Ruhakana Rugunda
- Sergius Katushabe
- Shaka Ssali
- Shem Bageine
- Silver Baguma
- Stanley Ntagali
- Tereza Mbire
- Timothy Twikirize
- Tumusiime-Mutebile
- Vastina Beyendera
- Wilfred Niwagaba
- Yosamu Baguma

== Natural Attributes ==
Katuna is also famous for very fertile lands that are used for dairy cattle keeping and the growing of Irish potatoes. Because of its strategic location at the border with Rwanda, Katuna has the potential to grow into a major border town in Uganda, just like other towns such as Malaba and Busia. Katuna has a distinctive terrain. On one side of the road are very steep and rocky mountains that make the construction of houses very tedious and expensive. On the other side of the road is a swampy and marshy valley. To construct houses on the swampy side of the road, one has to first fill the place with rocks and a lot of soil. These two aspects of physical landscape make construction in Katuna very expensive. They also make Katuna a very compact place.

== Kabale University ==
About 26 kilometres (16 mi) north of Katuna, there is Kabale University in Kabale town where students from Rwanda, Burundi, and DRC come to study together with Ugandan students. This young university has distinguished itself by winning a World Bank grant for promoting the use of information technology. Enrollment of Kabale University now stands at about 1,400 students and is still growing. Some of the students at Kabale University have done their studies in schools neighboring Katuna such as St. Barnabas Senior Secondary School in Karujanga, Janan Luwum Secondary School in Kamuganguzi, Buranga Senior Secondary School, Rukore High School and Rubaya Secondary School. Kabale University offers both undergraduate and post-graduate programs.

== Tourism ==
Katuna and the surrounding countryside has tourist potential. The hilly terrain that has earned Kigezi the nickname "Switzerland of Africa" is evident around Katuna. The terraced hills look beautiful with the wide variety of food crops and forest cover. Lake Bunyonyi is located about 20 kilometres (12 mi) northwest of Katuna. The lake can be accessed from Katuna by following the murram road that passes via Kakoma to Rubaya. The numerous mountains around Katuna are good for mountain climbing. From Katuna one can also access Mt. Muhavura, a dormant volcanic mountain close to Lake Bunyonyi. Mgahinga Gorilla National Park is also accessible from Katuna. There are modest hotels, such as Katuna Inn, where tourists can relax for a drink and local dishes. There is a police station within the town. As of December 2009, there is no bank on the Ugandan side of the border. Foreign exchange transactions are conducted by money changers who deal with currencies including United States Dollars, Rwandan francs and Ugandan shillings. Temperatures in the town sometimes fall as low as 40 °F (4 °C) at night. But during the day it gets warm, temperatures rising to as high as 60 °F (16 °C).

== Katuna market ==
In August 2015, the Ugandan government commissioned the construction of a USh 28 billion market at Kiruruma Government Farm. The market, which is located a few kilometers from the Katuna border town, is supported by the Common Market for Eastern and Southern Africa (Comesa) with funding from the European Union.

== See also ==
- Gatuna, Rwanda
- Kabale
- Kabale District
- Kabale University
