= Kigezi College Butobere =

Secondary school in Kabale, Kabale District

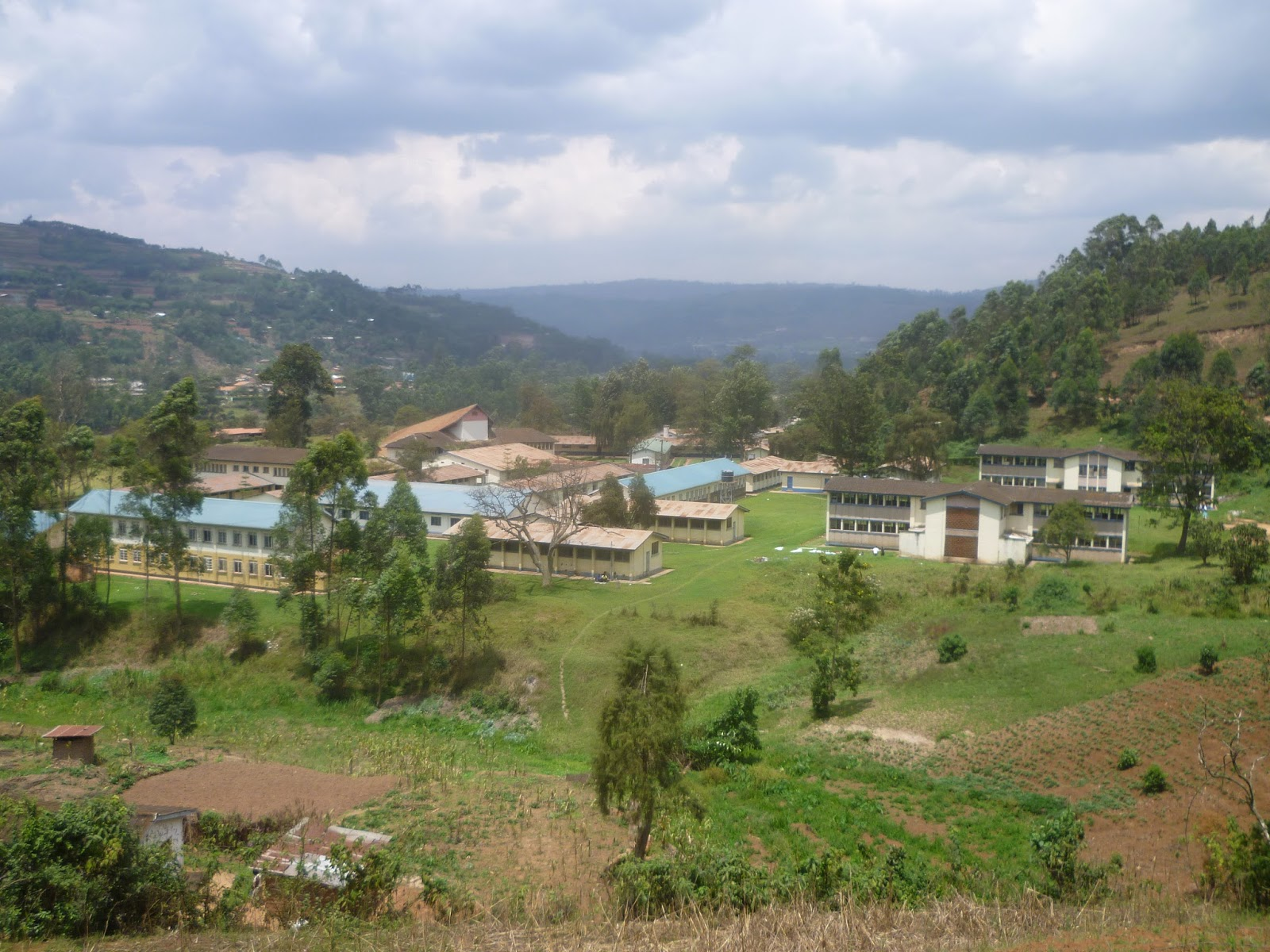
- View of Kigezi College Butobere (SINIYA) from one of the hills around the school.

Location
- Kabale, Kabale District; Uganda; 01°15′07″S 30°00′50″E

Information
- Type: Secondary School
- Motto: Progress Through Labour
- Established: 1957
- Chairman: Moses Turyomurugyendo Ntahobari
- Headteacher: Masiko Justus
- Former Headteachers: Katonda Kenneth, Osuu John Robert, Muganga Joseph Twine, Geoffrey Bashungwa, James Ilakut Akabwai
- Gender: Male
- Language: English
- Houses: Lumumba, Makobore, Bikangaga and Bwankosya.
- Sports: Rugby, Soccer, Track, Tennis, Volleyball, Basketball
- Nickname: "SINIYA"
- Alumni name: Abasiniya
- Website: https://kigezicollegebutobere.sc.ug

Kigezi College Butobere is the first boys-only, boarding, senior secondary school located in Kabale District in the Western Region of Uganda.

== Location ==
The school is 3 km from the centre of the town of Kabale (2014 population: 49,667), the largest urban area in the Kigezi sub-region off the Kabale-Mbarara road. This is in extreme southwestern Uganda, approximately 405 kilometres (252 mi), by road, southwest of Kampala, the capital of and largest city in Uganda. The coordinates of the school campus are 1°15'07.0"S, 30°00'50.0"E (Latitude:-1.251944; Longitude:30.013889).

== History ==
Kigezi College Butobere opened as the only senior secondary school in Kigezi District for boys in January 1957 and remained so until 1965, when Kigezi High School was upgraded to senior secondary status.

Graham Thomas, the headmaster from 1964 to 1966 initiated the change in the school’s name from Butobere Senior Secondary School to Kigezi College Butobere.

Kigezi District then comprised the present districts of Kabale, Rukungiri, Kisoro, Kanungu, Rukiga and Rubanda. The first students proclaimed to anyone who wanted to hear (okuteera omuranga) that only they attended a senior secondary school. And the peasantry of the clever young and future men of ‘Siniya’ baptised it thus.

In the 1950s, Government decided to establish non-faith-based secondary schools in each district in the country. Kigezi was given the slot for 1956, after which Mbarara District was to follow in 1957. Religious fights ripped apart the Kigezi chance, forfeiting their turn to Mbarara where Ntare School was started in 1956. How? The Catholics wanted it at St Mary’s Rushoroza while the Anglicans wanted it at Kigezi High School in Rugarama. Mzee Paulo Ngorogoza, a staunch Catholic and the Administrative Secretary of the district did not quite sit on the fence.

So when the parties disagreed and forfeited their turn, Government insisted that Ngorogoza selects an independent site for the 1957 intake. The sites he chose were rejected outright for being unsuitable. Ngorogoza later grudgingly selected the marshy and hilly 96 acres (38.7ha) of government land at Butobere, thinking that the Government would fail to develop it. (‘Butobere’ actually means marshland in Runyankore-Rukiga).

To his surprise, the colonialists took the offer. They planned the school main infrastructure of classrooms, dormitories and dining hall/kitchen on the tiny but ample flattish land of about 10 acres. Below this was left about 6 acres for sports facilities and another 10 acres for a lagoon and natural bush in the marshy valley. Channels to drain the land were dug and engineering took over. About 76 acres of land around the hill was left for staff quarters, facing the school’s main campus. The first building that catered for all purposes was Bwankosya. It served as a classroom, staff room, dining and dormitory for the 19 pioneer students and two teachers that started the school in February 1957. Later other classroom blocks, dining, kitchen and dormitory were built. And so Kigezi College Butobere was born.

== School Infrastructure ==
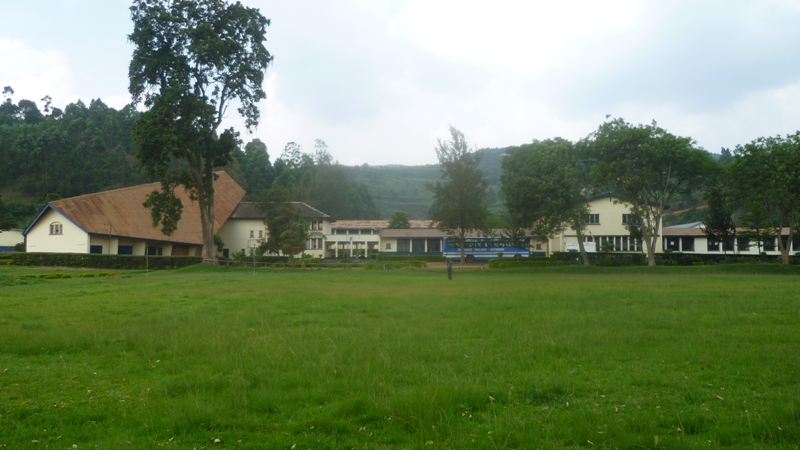
Kigezi College Butobere

Construction of these modern facilities played an integral part in making the school grow. These facilities included the construction of Kennedy Hall, the library block, and the Makobore and Bikangaga hostels which boasted modern indoor plumbing facilities. The school had well-furnished science laboratories, classroom blocks, dining facilities for the residents, a utility vehicle, and blue sweater (omugyogyi) with rain cape uniforms for the students.

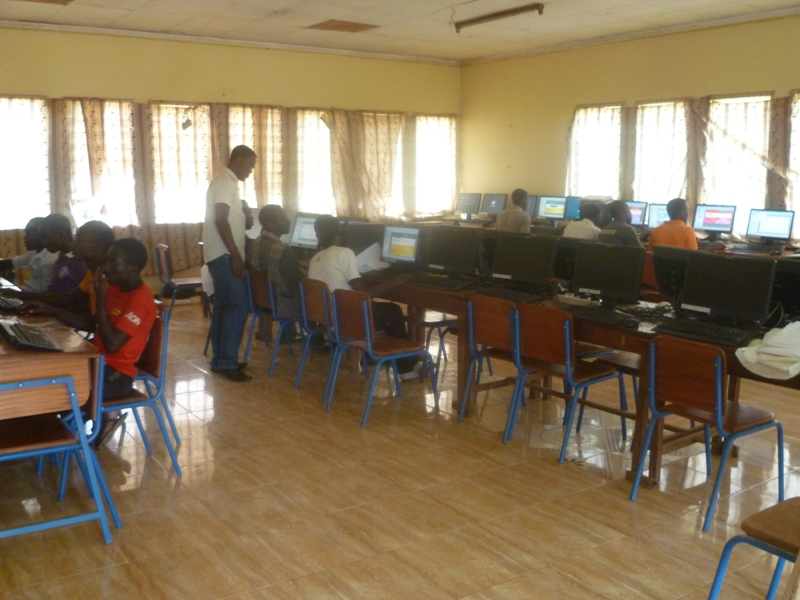

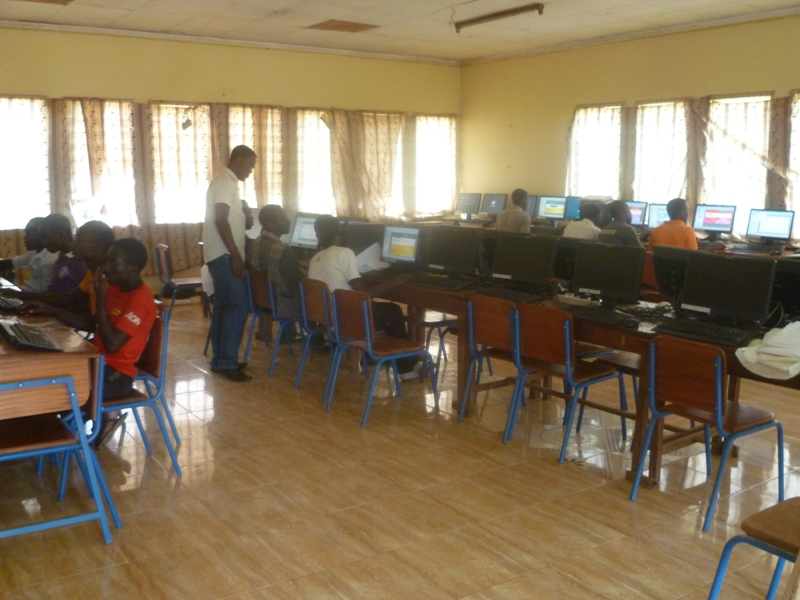
Kigezi College Butobere Computer Lab

In 1966 to 1969, there were two pitches – one for football, the other for rugby – which games were popular. Names of footballers like Shem Bageine were revered in football, athletics and academics.

=== Sports Infrastructure ===
Boxing was introduced in 1967 but some of the males injured others and it was soon abolished. There was a Grand Piano in Kennedy Hall, freely available to all. It turned many basiniya into musicians. Chess was a school game. Every dormitory had Snakes and Ladders, Scrabble and places to hang a net and play volleyball. Cross country was run around the 96 acres of the school land, along a route covering about six kilometers of valleys and hills. The schools to beat were Kichwamba and St Leos Kyegobe.

Entertainment and Rhythm clubs, at one time run by Amama Mbabazi, 1966–69 and others also produced creative plays and dances. With all these facilities, Siniya’s unsung slogan was “a healthy body, a healthy mind”. Yet most ‘Basiniya’ kept within the confines of the school which had no fence. Year in, year out, with classes only up to Senior Four, Butobere produced results that sent the boys to schools such as Makerere College School, King’s College Budo, Busoga College Mwiri, St Mary’s College Kisubi, Namilyango College, and others.

In its early days, the school competed well with its peers academically and in sports. In recent years, the school's academic performance has slipped.
It is also best known for its patriotic name "Siniya" and slogan "The only Siniya North of the River Limpopo and South of the Sahara". The Alumni are referred to as "Abasiniya" (plural) or "Omusiniya" (singular).

== Rivalries ==
The school has had rivalries with other schools in academics, sports, and social matters. The rivals have included St. Mary's College Rushoroza and Kigezi High School commonly known as "SHANKA".

== Prominent alumni ==
Notable Alumni of the school include:

1. Amama Mbabazi - Lawyer and politician. Former Prime Minister of Uganda 2011 - 2014
2. Lt. Gen. Henry Tumukunde - Current Minister of Security and Lieutenant General in the Uganda People's Defence Force
3. Emmanuel Tumusiime-Mutebile - Economist and academic. Governor of the Bank of Uganda since 2001. Chancellor, International University of East Africa, since 2014
4. Mondo Kagonyera - Veterinarian, academic, and politician. Former Chancellor of Makerere University and Current Chancellor of Kabale University
5. Hon. Henry Musasizi - Rubanda West MP & Chairman of the National Committee of Parliament.
6. Hon. Andrew Aja Baryayanga - Former Kabale Municipality MP
7. Adison Kakuru - Politician, businessman, farmer, and environmentalist
8. Gen David Muhoozi- Former Chief of Defence Forces UPDF and Current State Minister Of Internal Affairs

== Gallery ==
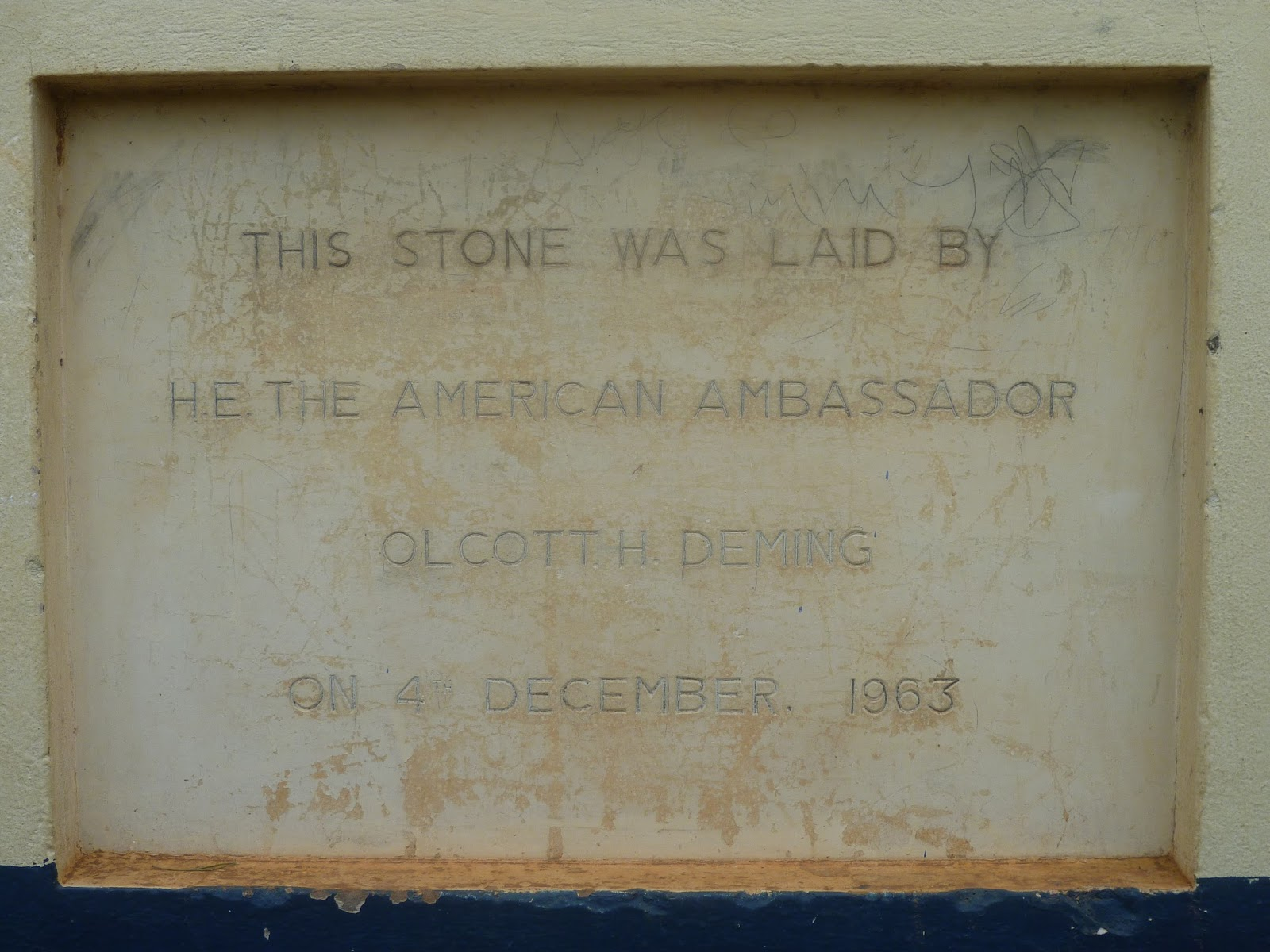
Foundation stone at Kennedy Hall, photographed in 2015

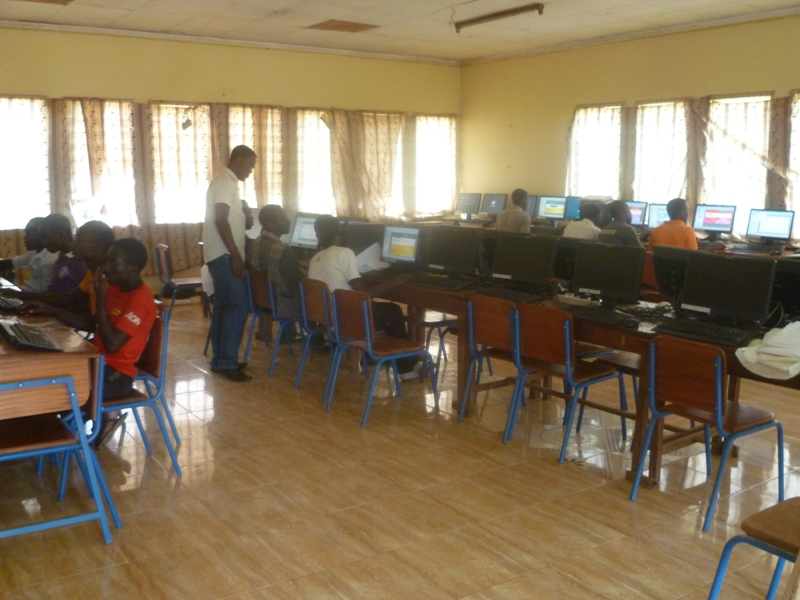
Session in the SINIYA computer laboratory

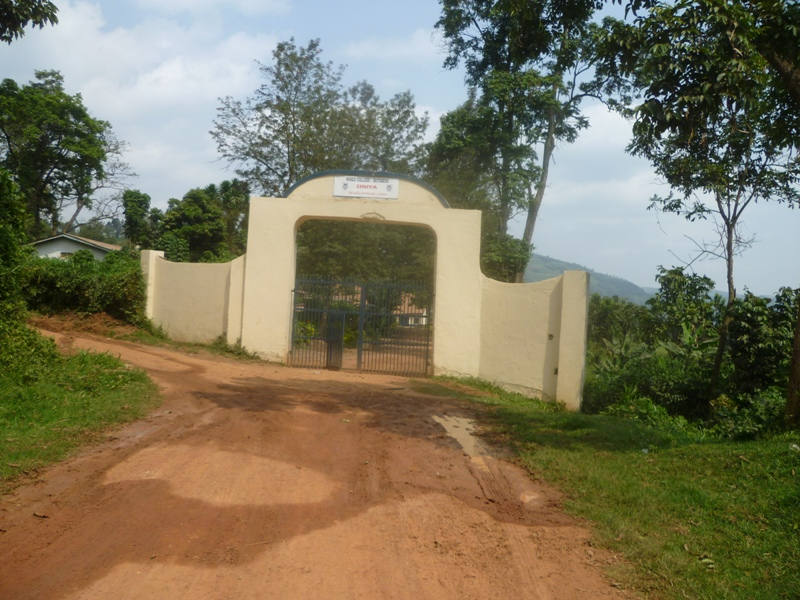
SINIYA gate, December 2016

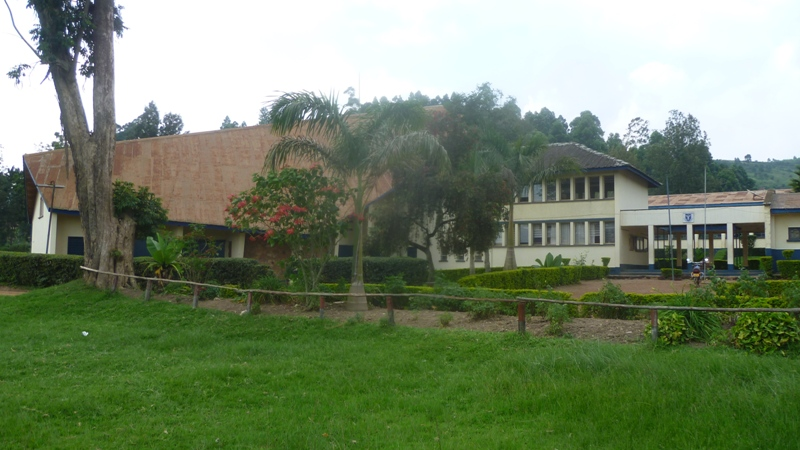
Kennedy Hall and part of the administration block

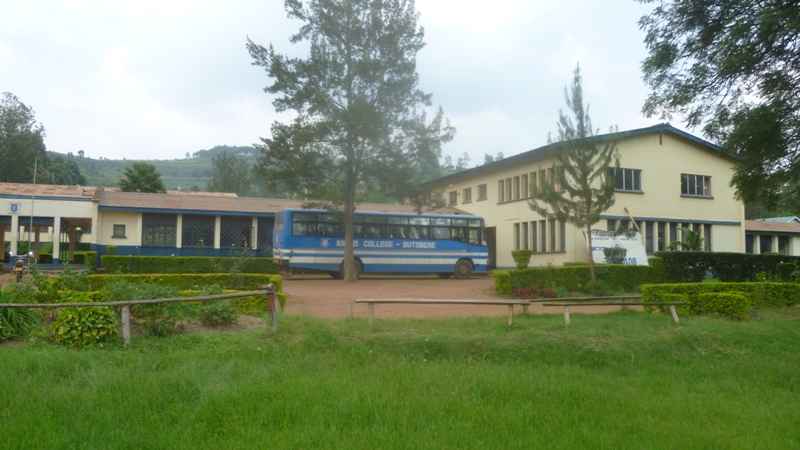
Front view of the administration block

== See also ==
- Education in Uganda
- List of schools in Uganda
