= Mparo, Rukiga =

Mparo
- Location in Uganda
- Coordinates: 01°11′04″S 30°03′16″E
- Country: Uganda
- Region: Western Uganda
- Sub-region: Kigezi sub-region
- District: Rukiga District

Mparo is a town in the Western Region of Uganda and the political and administrative center of Rukiga District. However, the largest town in the district and its major commercial center is Muhanga.

== Location ==
Mparo is located in Mparo Parish, Rwamucuucu sub-county, in Rukiga District, on the west bank of Kanyabaha River, immediately west of the urban center of Rwakahinda. This is about 21 kilometres (13 mi), by road, northeast of Kabale, the largest city in Kigezi sub-region. This is approximately 384 kilometres (239 mi), by road, southwest of Kampala, the largest city and capital of Uganda. The approximate geographical coordinates of Mparo, Rukiga District are: 01°11'04.0"S, 30°03'16.0"E (Latitude:-1.184444; Longitude:30.054444).

== Overview ==
Mparo is the location of the headquarters of Rukiga District, which became operational on 1 July 2017.

== See also ==
- Charles Mbire
- Anne Kansiime
- Godfrey Kalimugogo
- Jack Sabiiti
- Amama Mbabazi
- Adison Kakuru
