= Katuna–Muko Road =

Ugandan road

Coordinates: 01°20′29″S 29°52′17″E

Route information
- Length: 54 mi (87 km)
- History: Designated in 2019; Expected completion in 2024

Major junctions
- South end: Katuna
- North end: Muko

Location
- Country: Uganda

Highway system
- Roads in Uganda

The Katuna–Muko Road in the Western Region of Uganda connects the towns of Katuna and Muko, both in Kabale District.

== Location ==
The road starts at Katuna, at the international border with Rwanda, and approximately 26 kilometres (16 mi) south of Kabale, the largest city in the Kigezi sub-region, and the location of the headquarters of Kabale District.

From there, the road takes a general north-westerly direction, looping around the southern shores of Lake Bunyonyi. It passes between the Rwandan border to the west and the western shores of the lake to the east. It goes through a community called Kashasha, about 52 kilometres (32 mi) from Katuna.

The road then continues northwards for another 36 kilometres (22 mi), to end at Muko, on the Kabale–Kisoro–Bunagana Road. Muko is approximately 42 kilometres (26 mi), north-west of Kabale.

== Overview ==
This road is of importance to Uganda for two reasons. Lake Bunyonyi is increasingly becoming attractive to tourists, some of whom may come in from Rwanda, by road. Secondly, increased tourism demands increased services, leading to improved standards of living for those who provide those services. Improved transportation for the residents will enable them to benefit from the increased economic activity around the lake.

== Upgrading to bitumen ==
In February 2019, David Bahati, the junior minister for economic planning, who also doubles as the area member of parliament, announced that the government of Uganda had officially approached the African Development Bank and the Exim Bank of China to request a loan of US$96 million to upgrade this road to class II bitumen. The road is still in the planning stage.

== See also ==
- Economy of Uganda
- Transport in Uganda
- List of roads in Uganda
