= Jacklyn Jolly Tukamushaba =

Jacklyne Jolly Tukamushaba
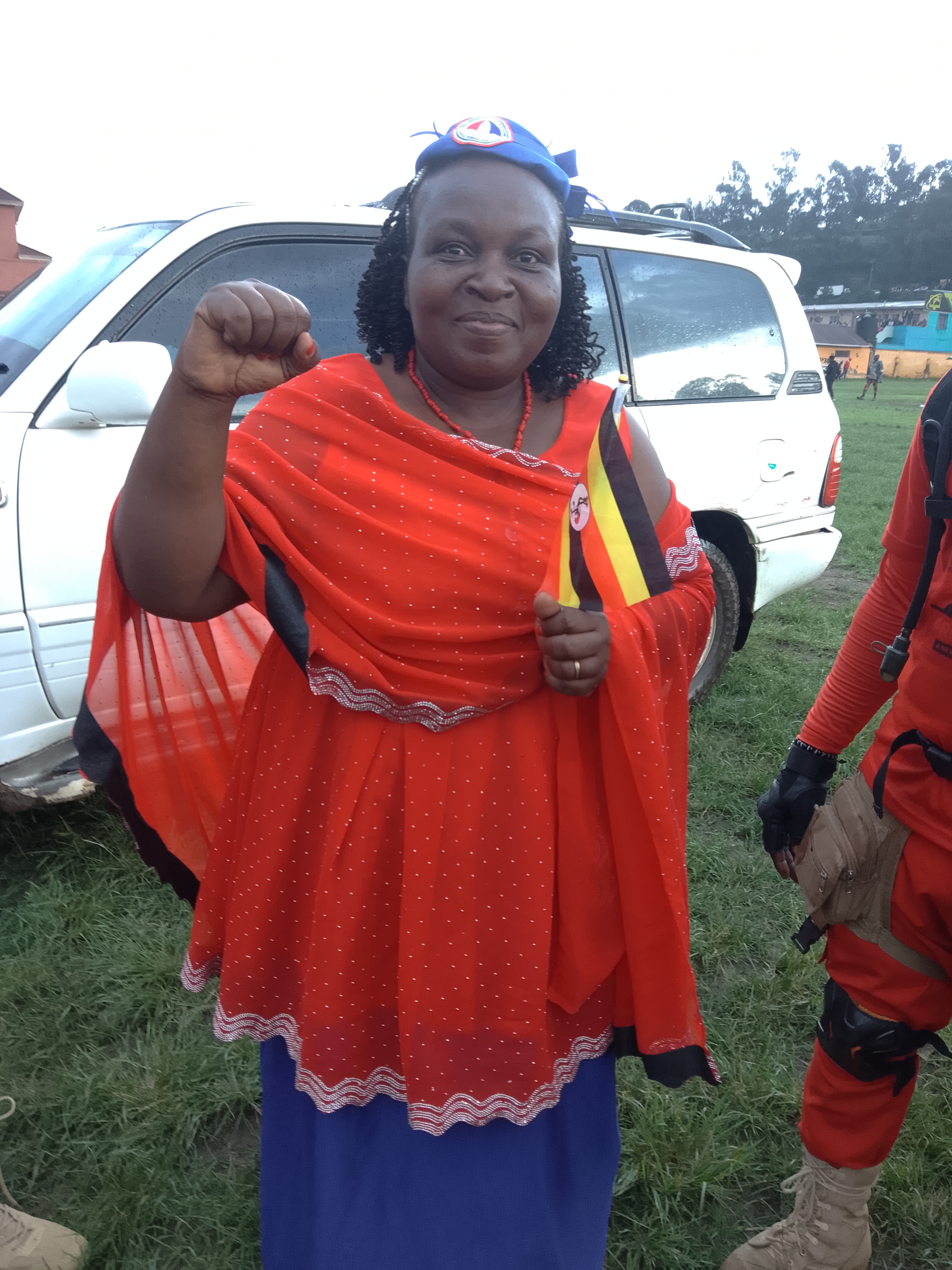
- Born: Kigara B, Kamwezi Sub‑county, Rukiga District, Uganda
- Education: Diploma in Business Education; Bachelor of Commerce; Master of Business Administration
- Alma mater: National Teachers College Kabale; Makerere University; Uganda Martyrs University
- Occupations: Politician, accountant, educator
- Known for: Political leadership within NUP
- Office: Deputy President of the National Unity Platform (Western Uganda)
- Political party: National Unity Platform (NUP)

Jacklyne Jolly Tukamushaba is a Ugandan politician and the Deputy President of the National Unity Platform (NUP) in charge of Western Uganda.

== Early life and education ==
Tukamushaba was born in Kigara B Village, Kamwezi Sub‑county, Rukiga District. She attended Kamwezi Primary School and St. Theresa Secondary School before earning a Diploma in Business Education from National Teachers College Kabale and a Bachelor of Commerce degree from Makerere University, and later completed a Master of Business Administration at Uganda Martyrs University, Nkozi.

== Political career ==
Tukamushaba serves as the Deputy President of the National Unity Platform (NUP) in charge of Western Uganda. In October 2025, she was nominated as the NUP candidate for the Rukiga District Woman Member of Parliament seat but was defeated in the January 2026 election.

In February 2026, Tukamushaba was remanded in custody on charges of incitement to violence.

== Career outside politics ==
Before becoming a leader at the National Unity Platform (NUP), Tukamushaba worked as an accountant and educator. She taught at local secondary schools and held finance and administration roles with World Vision’s Rukiga Area Development Program and with Community Efforts for Child Empowerment (CECE).
