= Godfrey Kalimugogo =

- Born: Godfrey Mwene Kalimugogo; 1 January 1943; Kabale District, Uganda
- Died: 25 January 2015 (aged 72)
- Education: Makerere University, University of Dar es Salaam
- Occupations: Diplomat, writer
- Writing career
- Genre: Fiction
- Notable works: Sandu, the Prince

Godfrey Mwene Kalimugogo (1943 – 25 January 2015) was a novelist and diplomat from Uganda. He also served as a diplomat, representing Uganda in Tanzania and Ethiopia. He retired from the diplomatic service in 2003.

== Early life ==
Kalimugogo was born in the village of Kyocezo, Kabale District, circa 1943 in south-western Uganda near the Rwandan border.

== Education ==
Kalimugogo was educated at Kihanga Boys' School in Mparo, Rukiga District, from where he went to Nyakasura School in Fort Portal, Kabarole District. He graduated with an honours degree in English and classical literature from Makerere University College of the University of East Africa in 1968. He obtained a postgraduate degree from the University of Dar es Salaam.

== Writing ==
His first book was published in 1972. A number of Kalimugogo's novels focus on the "lifestyle of the greedy hedonist and the ramifications associated with overt love of sex, booze and money".

Kalimugogo's first book, Dare to Die, was released in 1972, but it was his third novel, Trials and Tribulations in Sandu’s Home, released in 1974, that distinguished him as a witty writer. It was put on the literature syllabus. At the time of his death, he had published fifteen books. In 2004 and 2010, respectively, A Visitor Without a Mission and Bury Me in a Simple Grave earned him honours from the National Book Trust of Uganda.

== Works ==
- Dare to Die. East African Literature Bureau. 1972.
- The Pulse of the Woods. East African Literature Bureau. 1974.
- The Department. East African Literature Bureau. 1976.
- Trials and Tribulations in Sandu's Home. East African Literature Bureau. 1976. ISBN 978-0860704089.
- The Prodigal Chairman. Uzima Press. 1979.
- Pilgrimage to Nowhere. 1981.
- Sandu, the Prince. Kenya Literature Bureau. 1982.
- A Visitor Without a Mission. Victor B. Services. 2003.
- Bury Me in a Simple Grave. Baroque Publishers. 2009. ISBN 9789970181018.
- A Murky River. Baroque Publishers. 2009.
- The Honourable MP Who Resigned. VB Services. 2010. ISBN 9789970450039.
- Escape from the shadows. VB Services. 2012.
- A Sacred Letter of Love. 2013.
- A Gang Of Traitors. 2014.
- The Billionaires' Disease. 2015.
