= Andrew Baryayanga =

Ugandan politician (born 1979)

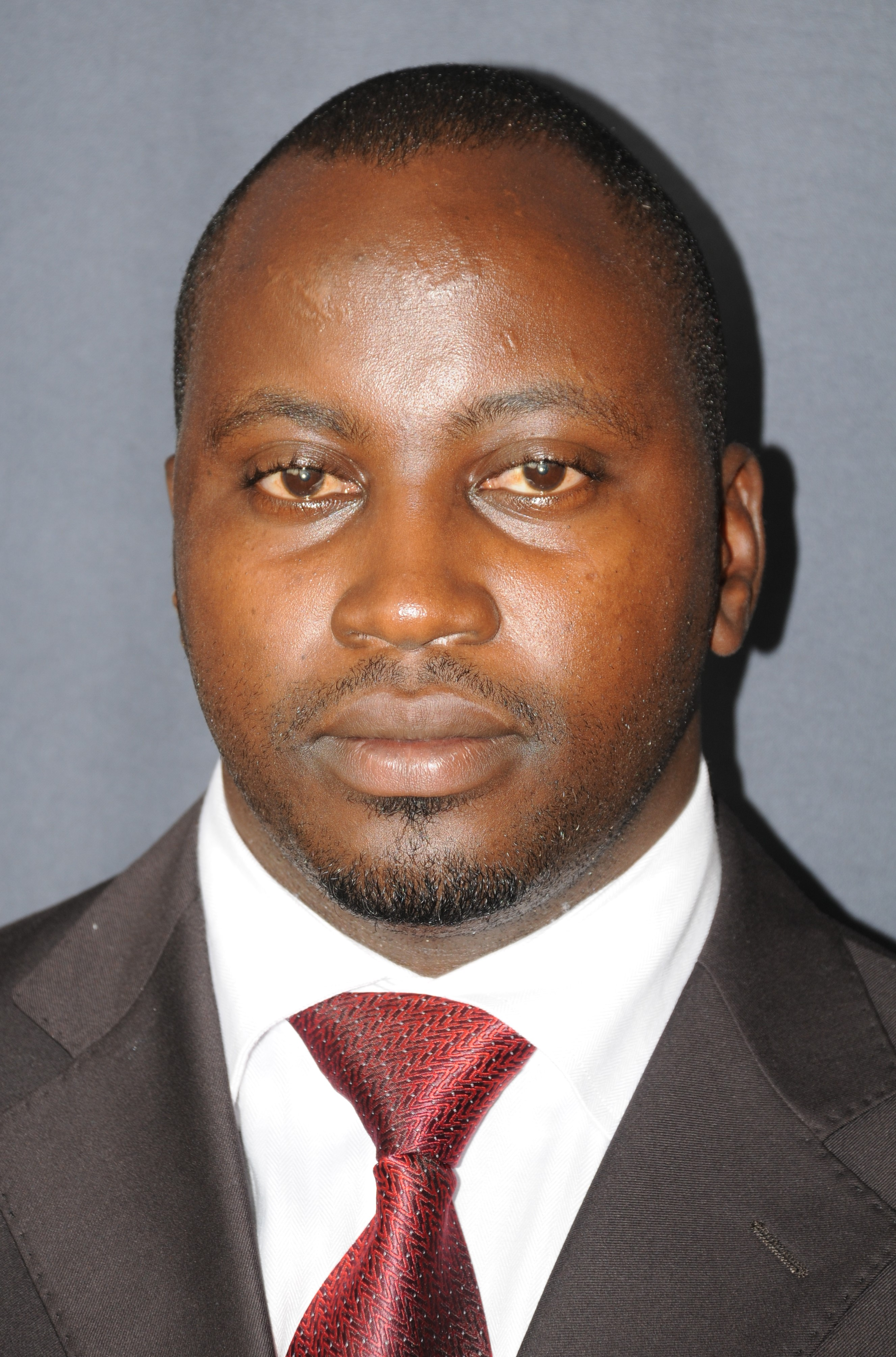

Honorable

Personal details
- Born: Andrew Baryayanga; 24 September 1979 (age 46) Kabale, Uganda
- Citizenship: Uganda
- Education: Makerere University (Bachelor of Arts) (CCNA)
- Occupation: Administrator, politician
- Known for: Entrepreneurship, politics

Andrew Aja Baryayanga (born 2 September 1979) is a Ugandan administrator, Microsoft Certified Professional, entrepreneur and politician. He is the reelected Member of Parliament for Kabale Municipality now serving a second term of office and is not affiliated to any political party in Uganda.

Baryayanga was the Independents Chief Whip and served on the Committee on Commissions, State Authorities & State Enterprises and the Committee on Natural Resources in the 10th Parliament of Uganda.

In the 9th Parliament, Baryayanga served on the Committee on Commissions, State Authorities & State Enterprises and the Committee on Natural Resources and during this term, he challenged the Inspector general of Government (IGG) inquiry on the Karuma hydropower project in the constitutional court. Baryayanga is also the founding director of Baata Engineering Company, an engineering contractors firm in Eastern Africa.

== Early life and education ==
Baryayanga was born in Kabale District, Kigezi sub-region, on 24 September 1979 in a Christian family of the Kiga people. He attended Kigezi High School Primary for his primary education and Kigezi College Butobere for both his O-level and A-Level academic qualifications. Consequently, he acquired his PLE certification in 1995, his UCE certification in 1999 and UACE certification in 2001.

Baryayanga further advanced to Makerere University for his university education where he graduated in 2007 with a Bachelor of Arts in Arts degree. Still in the same institution of higher education, Baryayanga acquired a CCNA certification in 2008 given his newly found love for information technology at the time. He continued to advance his computer knowledge by acquiring an MCSE certification (2010) from Tirat Carmel in Israel.

== Career ==
After acquiring his bachelor's degree in 2007, Baryayanga worked as a compliance support manager at De Point Consultants Limited. In 2009, he founded and served as director for Baata Engineering Company, a position he still holds.

In 2011, Baryayanga joined elective politics as an independent politician after falling out with the NRM during the ruling political party's primaries. He went on to win his first election and became a member of the 9th Parliament of Uganda representing Kabale Municipality. In 2016, he won reelection and continues to serve the same constituency in the 10th Parliament of the Pearl of Africa.

In the 9th Parliament, Baryayanga served on the Committee on Commissions, State Authorities & State Enterprises and the Committee on Natural Resources and during this term, he challenged the IGG’s power to investigate, let alone recommend the cancellation of a procurement in relation to the Karuma hydropower project. In the 10th Parliament, he is the Independents Whip and continues to serve on the Committee on Commissions, State Authorities & State Enterprises and the Committee on Natural Resources in the 10th Parliament of Uganda. Baryayanga is an advocate for the rights of independents or non-partisan politicians in Parliament and was one of the key drafters of the Biofuels Bill 2014.

== See also ==
- Kabale District
- Kigezi region
