= Shaka Ssali =

Ugandan-born American journalist and television presenter (1953–2025

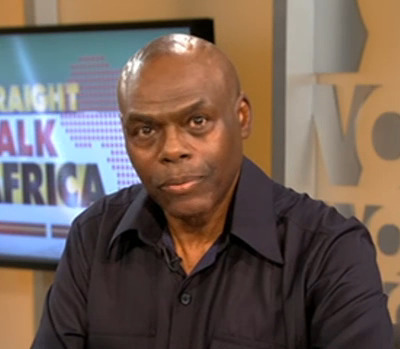
- Shaka Ssali, host of Straight Talk Africa
- Born: Turyagyenda Bernard; April 9, 1953; Kabale District, Protectorate of Uganda
- Died: March 27, 2025 (aged 71); Virginia, U.S.
- Other name: Kabale Kid
- Education: University of California, Los Angeles (BA, MA, PhD in Cross-Cultural Communications)
- Alma mater: Kigezi College Butobere Kigezi Junior Secondary School Kikungiri Primary School
- Occupations: Journalist, Broadcaster, Media Personality
- Years active: 1980s–2021
- Employer: Voice of America (VOA)
- Known for: Host of Straight Talk Africa
- Notable work: Straight Talk Africa
- Parents: John Mushakamba (father); Joyce Mushakamba (mother)
- Awards: UN Peacekeeping Special Achievement Award, Ford Foundation Fellow, UNAA Lifetime Achievement Award

Shaka Ssali (April 9, 1953 – March 27, 2025), also known as Kabale Kid, was a Ugandan-born American journalist best known as the host of Straight Talk Africa on Voice of America (VOA). He led the program for more than two decades, where he was recognized for facilitating discussions on democracy, governance, and development across Africa.

== Early life and education ==
Ssali was born in Kabale District, Western Uganda to John and Joyce Mushakamba. He attended Kikungiri Primary School, and later studied at Kigezi High School. He joined Kigezi College Butobere for junior secondary education. In 1965, he enrolled at Kigezi College Butobere for senior secondary studies, where he excelled in sports.

His education was interrupted in the 1960s, leading him to leave school early. During this period, he enlisted in the Uganda People's Defence Force as a paratrooper.

In 1976, Ssali moved to the United States looking for safety from Idi Amin’s oppressive regime. He later pursued higher education at the University of California, Los Angeles (UCLA), earning bachelor’s, master’s, and doctoral degrees in Cross-Cultural Communications.

== Career ==
Ssali began his broadcasting career at VOA as co-host of Africa World Tonight. In 2000, he became the founding host of Straight Talk Africa, a weekly talk show that featured African leaders, analysts, and citizens discussing political and social issues. His signature opening phrase—“I’m profoundly honored and exceedingly humbled”—became closely associated with the program.

Ssali retired from VOA in May 2021 but continued to mentor young journalists and participate in public speaking engagements.

== Recognition ==
In September 2024, the Ugandan North American Association (UNAA) presented Ssali with a Lifetime Achievement Award, recognizing his contributions to African media.

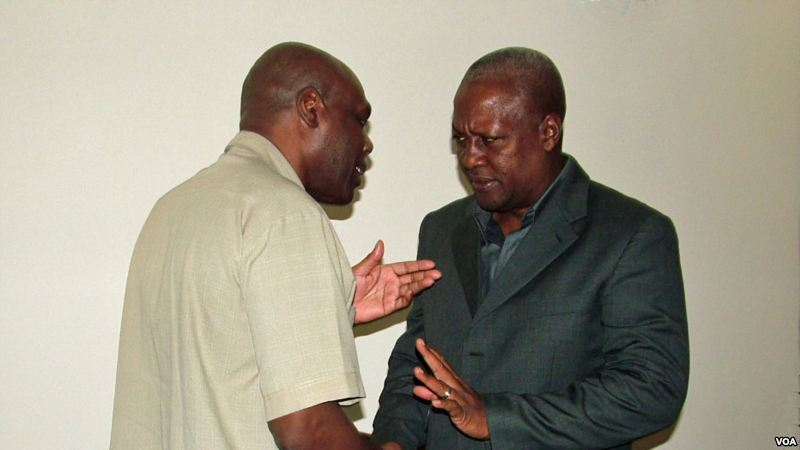
VOA's Shaka Ssali and Ghana's President John Dramani Mahama meet in Accra.

He was also a former Ford Foundation fellow and a recipient of several awards, including the United Nations Peacekeeping Special Achievement Award in International Journalism.

== Death ==
He died on March 27, 2025, in Virginia, at the age of 71, following surgery. He leaves behind a legacy of being a mentor to emerging journalists and a bridge between African leaders and the public.

== See also ==
- Ugandan Americans
