= Caroline Kamusiime =

Ugandan legislator and member of parliament

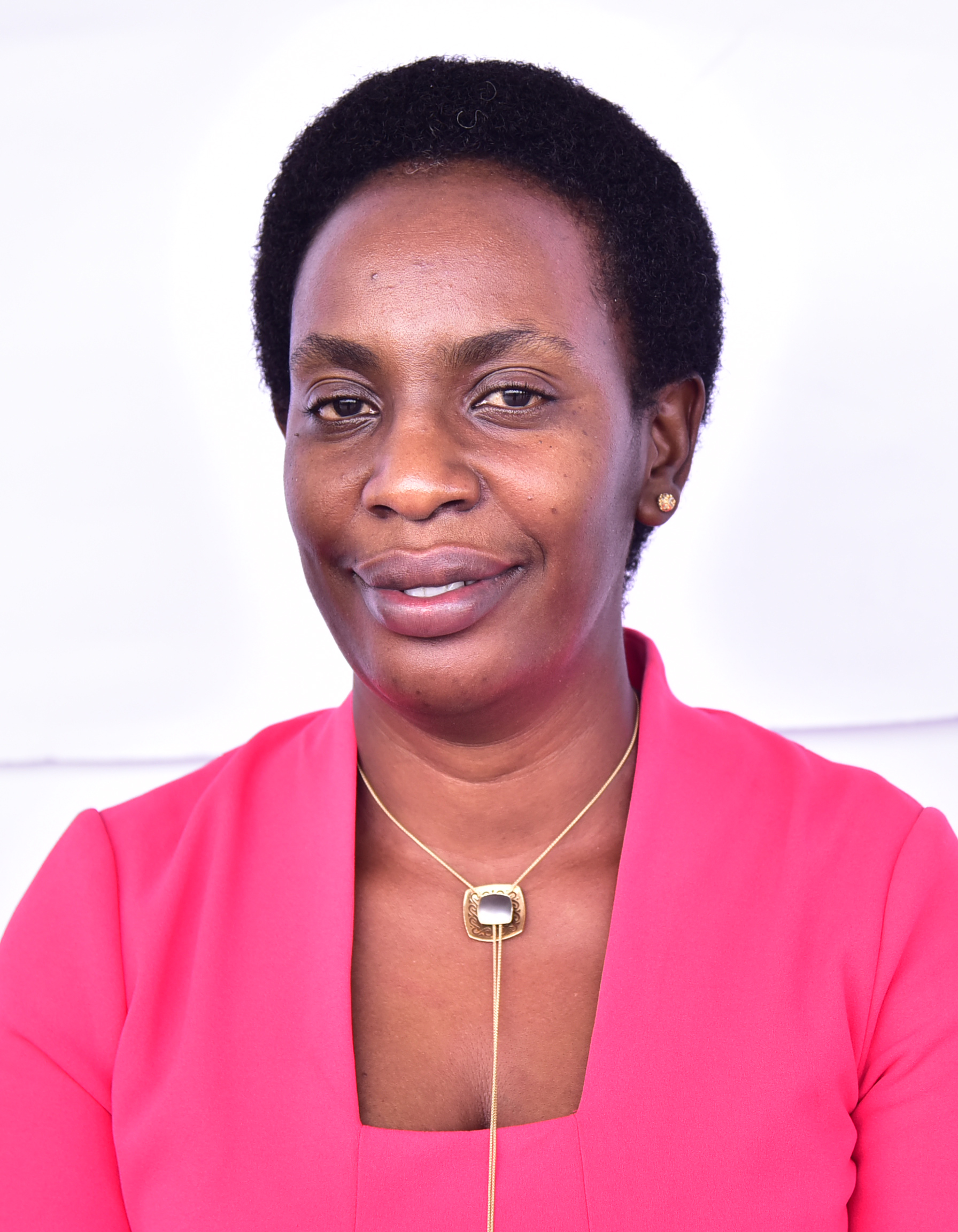
- Born: 23 November 1982 (age 43); Rukiga District
- Education: Kololo High School; Bishop Comboni College Kanungu; Makerere University (Bachelor's degree in information technology)
- Occupation: Legislator
- Political party: National Resistance Movement (NRM)

Caroline Kamusiime (born 23 November 1982) is a Ugandan female legislator representing the people of Rukiga district as district woman member of parliament of Uganda. She is a member of the National Resistance Movement (NRM) the party in political leadership in Uganda under the chairmanship of Yoweri Kaguta Museveni president of the republic of Uganda.

Kamusiime has been part of efforts to finding a solution for the feud and cold relations between Rwanda and Uganda, where Rwanda closed its borders to Uganda accusing Uganda of funding elements that want to bring down the Rwandan regime.

In 2021, she was re elected as a member of the 11th parliament.

In the 2026 January general elections, she lost her east to Dr Sylvia Arinaitwe, who was elected and sworn in as the woman member of parliament for Rukiga district in the 12th parliament of Uganda.

== Early life and education ==
Kamusiime was born on 23 November 1982. She undertook her O‑Level education from Kololo High School where she sat her Uganda Certificate of Education (UCE) in 1997. She later enrolled at Bishop Comboni College Kanungu, where she completed her Uganda advanced certificate of education (UACE) in 1999. She later received a bachelor's degree in information technology from Makerere university in 2010.

== Career ==
Kamusiime has been a member of the Parliament of Uganda since 2017.

She was information technology officer at MTN Uganda from 2011 to 2016,

She was also a front-desk officer at British American tobacco Uganda from 2006 to 2010 and was an accountant for caltex Uganda from 2000 to 2006.

In the Uganda parliament, she serves on the legal and parliamentary affairs committee
