= Gatuna (disambiguation) =

Gatuna may refer to the following:

- Gatuna, Uganda, the Ugandan town on the border with Rwanda, also known as Katuna
- Gatuna, Rwanda, the Rwandan town on the border with Uganda.
