= Crystal Bright =

American musician and artist

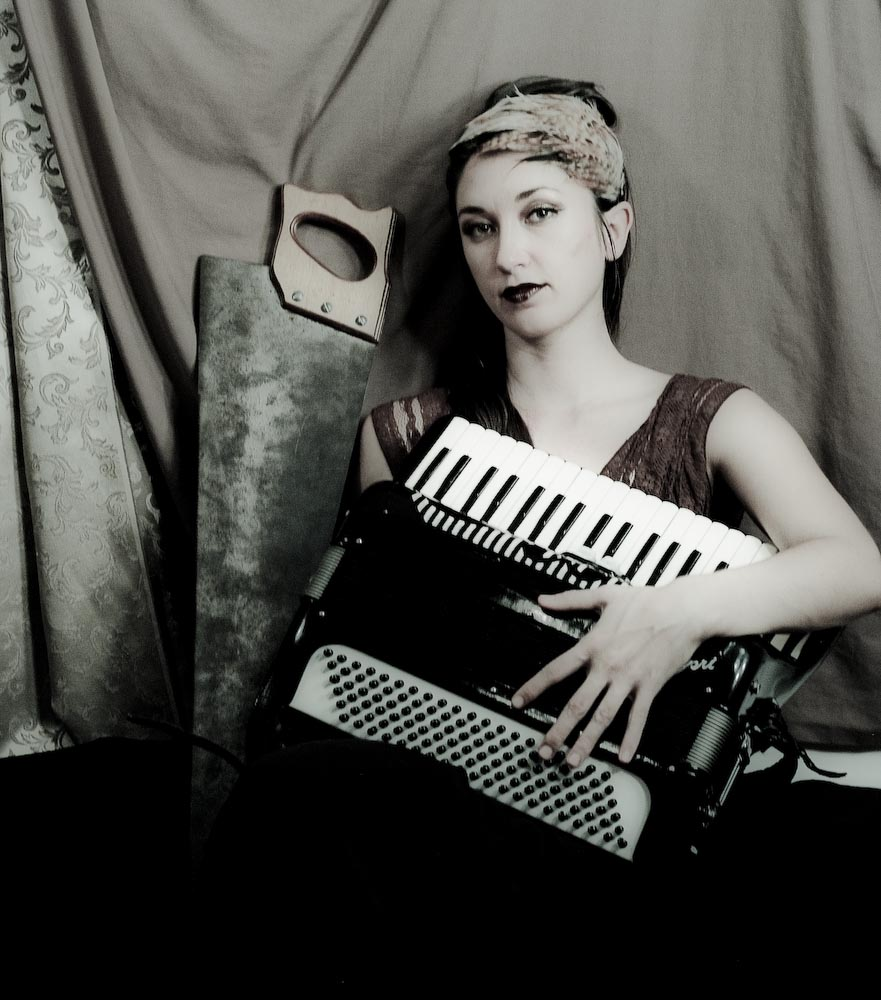
- Crystal Bright

Background information
- Born: Crystal Dawn Bright; Annapolis, Maryland; United States
- Genres: World music, folk, jazz, Flamenco, Cabaret, Mariachi, Brazilian Samba, Balinese gamelan, Chinese, Indonesian, Ugandan
- Occupations: Singer, songwriter, multi-instrumentalist, music teacher, performance artist, theatrical director & producer, holistic health coach / nutritionist
- Instruments: Vocals, musical saw, accordion, keyboards, concertina, adungu, bombo, zheng, piano, guitar, vihuela
- Years active: 2010–present
- Website: www.crystalbrightandthesilverhands.com

Crystal Dawn Bright is a musician and multimedia artist from North Carolina. She is a singer, songwriter, multi-instrumentalist, music teacher, performance artist, theatrical director & producer, and holistic health coach / nutritionist. As founder and leader of the band Crystal Bright & the Silver Hands, she has released three studio albums and one live album, been reviewed internationally, and performed with the North Carolina Symphony. She won the North Carolina Symphony's Triangle Talent Search in September 2010 and released a music video in October 2011. The local YES! Weekly named her Best Singer in March 2012, Best Songwriter in May 2014, and Best Musician in the Triad in May 2015. Her music has been called "carnival folk, fairytale pop and gypsy jazz" and was described by the BBC as "a pleasant kind of bonkers."

== Education and awards ==
Bright was born in Annapolis, Maryland and raised in Mount Pleasant, North Carolina, where she began taking music lessons at the age of seven. After performing in numerous high school musicals, Bright studied Drama before earning a Bachelor's degree in Anthropology from the University of North Carolina at Greensboro. She then earned a master's degree in Ethnomusicology from Florida State University while performing in a variety of genre-spanning acts.

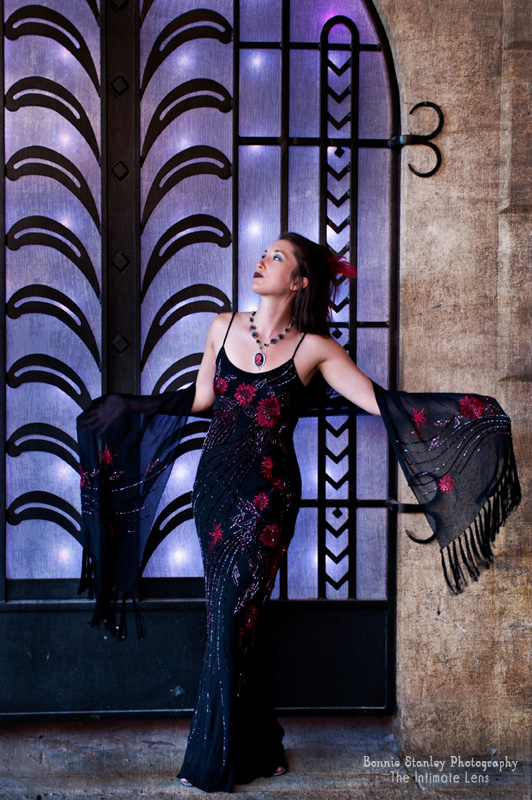
Crystal Bright

Inspired by P.J. Harvey, Björk, Tori Amos, Tom waits, Yann tiersen, Gotan project, Lhasa de Sela and The Tiger Lillies, Bright played in Mariachi, Balinese gamelan, Chinese, Ugandan, Brazilian Samba and Indonesian ensembles. After graduate school, Bright traveled the world where she studied flamenco dancing in Spain, worked for the Montana Conservation Corps in Yellowstone National Park, and became further acquainted with other cultures and their music.

She won the North Carolina Symphony's Triangle Talent Search in September 2010. The local YES! Weekly named her Best Singer in March 2012, Best Songwriter in May 2014, and Best Musician in the Triad in May 2015. She was featured as the Nimbit Artist of the Week on the PreSonus Studio One Blog in December 2014 and was featured on Band of the Day in May 2015.

Her singing has been described as "captivating and mysterious," featuring her "mystical, even otherworldly" vocal inflections. Her "operatic voice teems with ethereal beauty" and she plays many unusual instruments, including a musical saw, accordion, keyboards, concertina, adungu (Ugandan harp), bombo (Argentinian drum), zheng (zither), piano, guitar and vihuela.

Bright is a certified Holistic Health Coach / Nutritionist with a degree from the Institute for Integrative Nutrition in New York City. She practices through her company Crystal Bright Holistic Health.

== Art and theater projects ==
Bright acted, sang and played music in two collaborations with mixed media sculptor Grey Pascal at Acme Art Studios in Wilmington, NC. "20/20: Filters of Light and Insight" was a 3D performance art piece which debuted on May 28, 2010, with a theme that revolved around two mythological lovers striving to express divine beauty. "Downward Spiral" took place on October 15, 2011, and illustrated the metamorphosis of a girl into a woman who exudes creative power.

Bright wrote, directed, produced and starred in the musical interpretive movement theater production "Illuminating and Transcending the Shadow," which featured her performing with her band the Silver Hands and a cast of 16 costumed actors. The whimsical yet impassioned production chronicled the journey of conquering the self-imposed oppression that holds people back. The show was co-produced by Rusty McDonald of DividingMe Photography. The show debuted at the Broach Theater in Greensboro, NC in October 2010 with three further performances at the Greensboro Fringe Festival's 10th Anniversary Showcase at the Cultural Arts Center's City Arts Studio Theater in January 2012.

Bright co-produced and starred in "Bones & Lilies," a collaboration with members of The Flowjo Family Circus which combined a musical concert with experimental theatre, performance art, interpretive dance, and circus arts including acrobatics, aerial silks, hooping, belly dance, juggling, stilt walking and a fire processional. There were two performances on March 2 and 3, 2012 at The Flowjo in Carrboro, NC.

== Crystal Bright and the Silver Hands ==
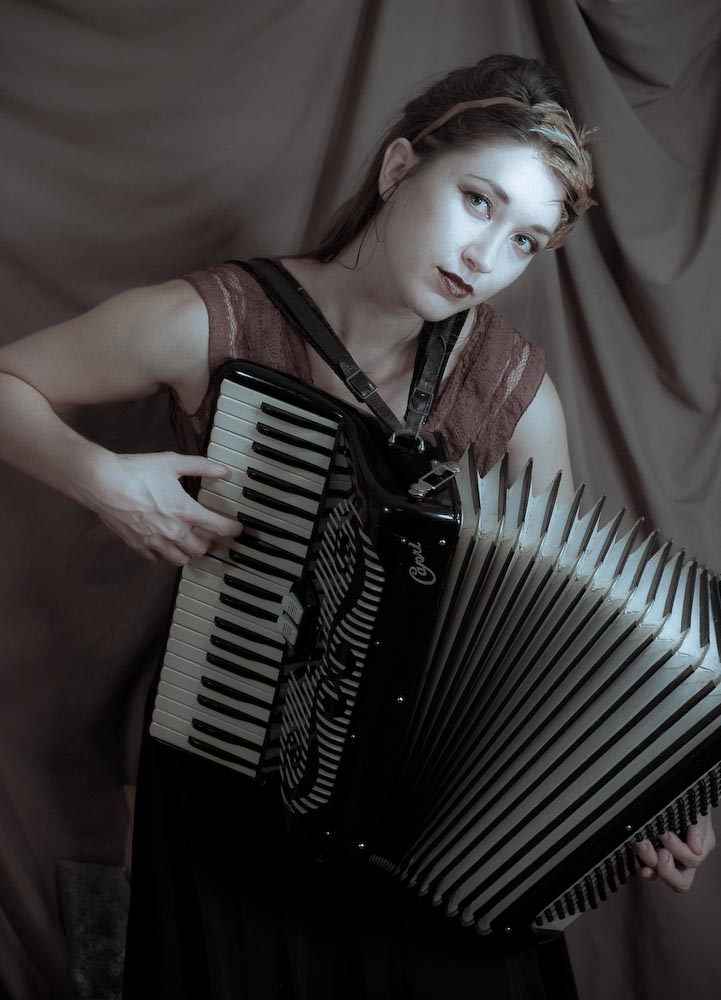
Crystal Bright

Founded in Greensboro, North Carolina in 2010, Crystal Bright & the Silver Hands take their name from a classic piece of folklore by The Brothers Grimm. "There is a story called 'The Handless Maiden'," Bright said, "and it is about her losing her hands and gaining them back in the end, representing her coming into her full creative and soulful self, which I felt like I was doing then, and am still doing." "I had written all these songs and I needed help in creating a band and taking my music to the next level. The Silver Hands help me create something bigger than my own hands could."

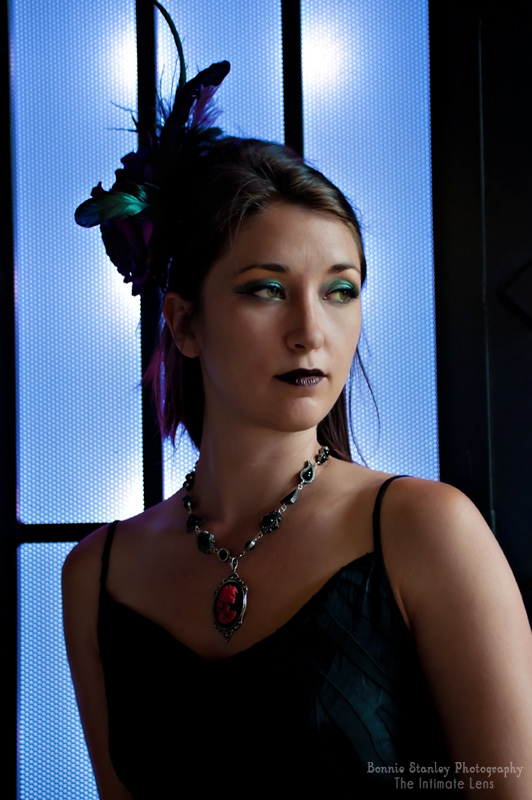
Crystal Bright

Compared to Kate Bush, Gogol Bordello, Danny Elfman, and Amanda Palmer and Brian Viglione's The Dresden Dolls, Bright creates "a haunted, whimsical, multicultural sonic cabaret" – "the sound of dark fairy tales" and "European carnivals." They deliver a "grand sense of theatricality" with Bright's unusual and unexpected arrangements and time signatures. One reviewer wrote that "the Silver Hands understand the importance of a little chaos... especially among such beautifully orchestrated music."

With songs deeply rooted in folktales, fables, myths and dream archetypes, Bright's lyrics and melodies portray the world as a dark, strange and often funny place. She prefers to write about society and culture rather than relationships. A major inspiration is the book "Women Who Run With Wolves: Myths and Stories of the Wild Woman Archetype” by Clarissa Pinkola Estes. Song topics include twists on Hans Christian Andersen's Little Match Girl and The Ugly Duckling, the Slavic witch Baba yaga, and the Inuit folk tale of the Skeleton Woman.

As of February 2018, Bright has performed over 800 concerts, including festivals such as South by Southwest (SXSW), Dragon Con, MidPoint Music Festival, FloydFest, Shakori Hills Grassroots Festival, Savannah Stopover and Steampunk World's Fair. She has performed shows with artists including Beats Antique, Voltaire, Adam Arcuragi, The Love Language, Pearl and the Beard, Holy Ghost Tent Revival, Rising Appalachia, Larkin Grimm and Lolo. Bright collaborated and performed with the North Carolina Symphony on an arrangement of her song "Toy Hammer" for their 2010 New Year's Eve program at Meymandi Concert Hall in Raleigh, North Carolina. Bright and the Silver Hands performed a live score to the classic silent horror movie The Cabinet of Dr. Caligari in October 2015 and October 2016.

=== Albums ===
Their self-titled debut album, Crystal Bright & the Silver Hands, was released in June 2010 to reviews praising its "experimental vaudeville" and "twisted carnival folk." Their second album, Muses & Bones, was released in March 2012. It was mastered by Grammy Award-winning engineer Gene Paul (son of guitarist/inventor Les paul) at G&J Audio. It was described as "stunningly beautiful," filled with "power, grace and style," and "a record for freaks and thinkers, healers and hippies, the cool and the curious and for people who just want a little more."

Their third album, "Live on All Hallows' Evening", was released in April 2013 and chronicles a collaborative performance with the Castaway Cabaret performance art troupe at The Blind Tiger in Greensboro, NC in October 2012. Their fourth album, "The Absolute Elsewhere" was released in May 2015 with every song written to accompany a piece of art created by Rusty McDonald of DividingMe Photography. The album was featured on the front page of AllMusic.com who described it as "wildly eclectic, engaging and creative" with "no shortage of twists and turns."

=== Video ===
The video for "Drowned Out", from their second album, Muses & Bones, won the Best Overall Video award at the HearNC Music Video Festival at Cat's Cradle in Chapel Hill, NC in December 2011 and won DrunkenMermaid's Video Battle of the Bands in June 2012. It was screened at the Indie Grits Film Festival as part of the Shuffle Magazine Showcase at the Nickelodeon Theatre in Columbia, SC in April 2012 and at The Carrboro Film Festival at the Carrboro Century Center in Carrboro, NC in November 2012.

Following a private showing at DragonCon in Atlanta GA in late August 2018, the video for "Choke", from The Absolute Elsewhere, was released on October 23, 2018. Beginning in early 2016, the video, with a cast and crew of over 50 people, was filmed in 4 different locations in NC over the course of over 2 years. It features an alternate version of Crystal as a child, played by Rachael Skipper, wandering through an abandoned castle, Castle Mont Rouge, and surrounding field before encountering a mirror in a house of horrors and turning into the adult version of Crystal, played by Crystal herself. The adult Crystal is chased by inhabitants of the house as the song gets more intense at the end. The video for "Choke" was directed and produced by Ron Royster and filmed (and produced) by Craig Thieman.

=== Members ===
Permanent members:

- Crystal Bright – Vocals, musical saw, accordion, keyboards, concertina, adungu, bombo, zheng, piano, guitar, vihuela

Rotating members:

- Jeremy Haire – Electric and nylon guitars
- Rob DiMauro – Drums
- Omar Ruiz-Lopez - Violin
