= Adison Kakuru =

Ugandan politician (born 1962)

Adison Kakuru is a Ugandan politician, businessman, farmer, and environmentalist. He was the elected member of Parliament representing Rukiga County in Kabale District in the 8th Parliament of Uganda. He also served as the elected district chairperson of Kabale District (LC 5 chairman), district council speaker in Kabale, and member of the Kabale District Council representing Rwamucucu Sub-county. He is a member of the National Resistance Movement political party.

== Biography ==
Kakuru was born on 14 April 1962 in Kabale District. He attended Kigezi College Butobere for his O and A level education. Kakuru obtained a Bachelor of Science degree in forestry, with honors, from Makerere University in 1990. He also holds a Master of Science degree in environment and natural resources management from Makerere University. He attended the International Agricultural Centre, Wageningen, Netherlands.

== Career ==
Kakuru has served as an officer in the research department of the Forestry Department as a counterpart staff to the Government of Uganda's Agroforestry Research Network for Africa (AFRENA).

At the Ugandan National Agricultural Research Organization, he worked as a research officer/centre manager at the Forestry Research Institute and also worked on other projects. He was head of the Kabale AFRENA Station. He was also head of the Natural Resources section of Africare under Africare/USAID, a Title II Food for Peace funded Project called the Uganda Food Security Initiative.

As an environmentalist, Kakuru worked at the Regional Centre for Services in Surveying, Mapping and Remote Sensing, in Nairobi, Kenya; the International Centre for Research in Agroforestry in Nairobi; the International Atomic Energy Agency and the Food and Agriculture Organization in Vienna, Austria; the National Agricultural Research Organisation in Kampala, Uganda; and the World Mountain Peoples' Association in Paris, France.

== Politics ==
In April 1992, Kakuru was elected a member of the Kabale District Council, representing the Rwamucucu Sub-county. He held the office until 2002, serving as chairperson of the District Education Committee and the District Production and Environment Committee. In April 1998, he was elected district council speaker of Kabale, a position he held until March 2002, while also serving as the chairman of the District Council Business Committee.

Kakuru became the Kabale District chairperson in April 2002, defeating Francis Runumi. He was re-elected to the same office in 2006. In March 2010, he resigned to take part in the 2010 Rukiga county federal by-election.

In March 2010, Kakuru was elected a member of the 8th Ugandan Parliament, representing Rukiga County in the Kabale District after defeating Forum for Democratic Change candidate Jack Sabiiti. While in Parliament, he served on the standing committee Physical Infrastructure and the sessional committee of Commissions, Statutory Authorities and Government Enterprises.

In the 2011 national election, he lost to Jack Sabiiti.

== See also ==
- Jack Sabiiti
- Parliament of Uganda
