= James Makubuya =

James K. Makubuya
- Born: Gayaza, Wakiso District, Uganda
- Genres: Traditional Ugandan, world music
- Occupations: Ethnomusicologist; musician; singer; dancer; choreographer; educator
- Instruments: Endongo; adungu; endingidi; amadinda; engoma
- Years active: 1989–present
- Labels: Music of the World; Traditional Crossroads
- Website: wabash.edu
James Makubuya
- Massachusetts Institute of Technology (1996–2000)
- Wabash College

 }}

}}

James K. Makubuya (born in Gayaza, Wakiso District, Uganda) is an ethnomusicologist, instrumentalist, singer, dancer, and choreographer. He plays several traditional instruments from various parts of Uganda, including the endongo (8-string bowl lyre) and adungu (9-string bow harp), endingidi (1-string tube fiddle), amadinda (12-slab log xylophone), akogo (lamellaphone), and engoma (drums).

== Early life ==
Makubuya was born in the town of Gayaza (located 30 km from Kampala, near Lake Victoria, in the Buganda region of Uganda), and is a member of the Baganda ethnic group.

== Education ==
He holds a B.A. in music and English literature from Makerere University in Kampala, Uganda (1980); a Master of Music degree in Western music and music education from Catholic University of America in Washington D.C. (1988), and a Ph.D. in ethnomusicology from the University of California, Los Angeles (1995).

His main research focuses on organological studies in which has written many scholarly papers, including a comparative study of East African bowl lyres, bow harps, and tube fiddles.

== Career ==
He has taught at the Massachusetts Institute of Technology (1996–2000), where he founded the ensemble, and is an Associate Professor of Music at Wabash College in Crawfordsville, Indiana, where he directs the WAMIDAN ensemble.

Makubuya performs in a cross-cultural duo with Chinese pipa performer Wu Man. His Abadongo, for endongo, mbuutu, and string quartet was performed at the University of California by the composer and the Kronos Quartet.

He has recorded three solo CDs and appears as a guest artist on a fourth (Wu Man and Friends, 2005). His music has also been featured in several films, including Mississippi Masala (1991).

== Writings ==
- Makubuya, James (1995). "Endongo: The Role and Significance of the Baganda Bowl Lyre of Uganda." Los Angeles, California: University of California, Los Angeles. Ph.D. dissertation.

== Discography ==
- 1993 - The Uganda Tropical Beat I
- 1989 - African Odyssey (Music of the World)
- 1998 - Taata Wange
- 2000 - Watik, Watik: Music from Uganda. Music of the World
- 2005 - Wu Man and Friends. Traditional Crossroads.

== See also ==
- Shaka Ssali
- Ugandan Americans
