= Henry Musasizi =

Ugandan politician (born 1981)

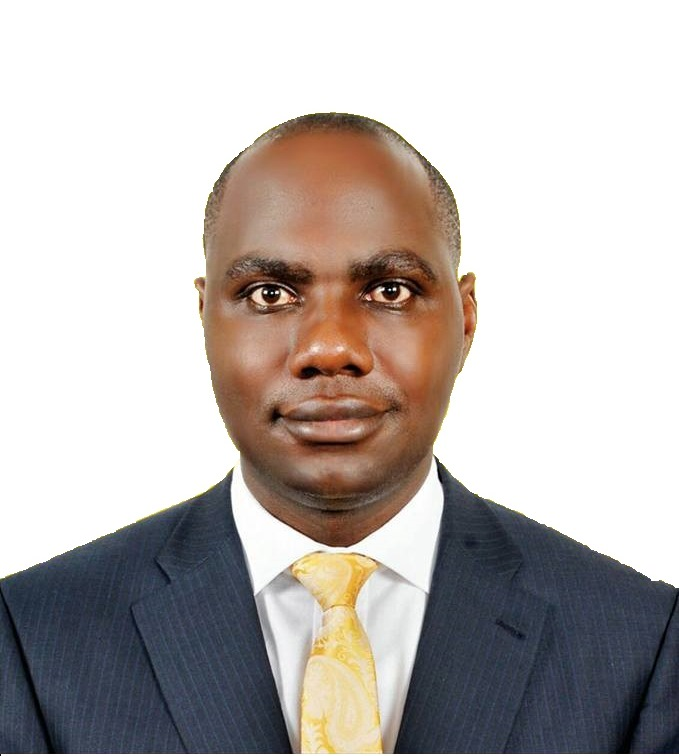

Honorable

Personal details
- Born: Henry Musasizi; 25 February 1981 (age 45) Kabale, Uganda
- Citizenship: Uganda
- Education: Heriot-Watt University (MBA); Makerere University (Bachelor of Commerce); ICPAU (CPA Certificate)
- Occupation: Accountant, Politician
- Known for: Accountancy, politics

Henry Ariganyira Musasizi (born 25 February 1981) is a Ugandan business administrator, certified public accountant and politician. He serves as the Minister of Finance, Planning and Economic Development — Uganda's top finance post — and is the re-elected Member of Parliament for Rubanda County East, representing the NRM, Uganda's ruling political party.

Musasizi was elevated to full Cabinet minister in May 2026, replacing long-serving Finance Minister Matia Kasaija. On 11 June 2026, he delivered the National Budget for FY 2026/27, projecting Uganda's fastest economic growth in decades at 10.2%, driven by the commencement of commercial oil production.

Musasizi was the chairperson of the Committee on Finance, Planning and Economic Development and a member of the Business Committee in the 10th Parliament of Uganda. He is the Chairperson NRM Rubanda District. He also served on the Public Accounts Committee in the 9th Parliament of the Pearl of Africa.

== Early life and education ==
Musasizi was born in Rubanda, Kabale District, on 25 February 1981 in a Catholic family of the Bakiga. He had his primary education in his home district of Kabale acquiring his PLE certification in 1994. He then attended Kigezi College Butobere for his O-Level education, attaining his UCE certification in 1998, and the same school for his A-Level education where he acquired his UACE certification in 2000.

Musasizi further advanced to Makerere University where he graduated in 2005 with a Bachelor of Commerce. He then pursued a postgraduate certificate at the Institute of Certified Public Accountants of Uganda (ICPAU) and became a certified public accountant in 2009. In 2012, Musasizi attained a Master of Business Administration from Heriot-Watt University, a public university based in Edinburgh, Scotland.

== Career ==
=== Accountancy ===
Upon acquiring his bachelor's degree in 2005, Musasizi worked for a year as an accountant with Caritas-Kabale Diocese, the social services and development department of the Roman Catholic Diocese of Kabale. In 2007, he got employment at the African Medical and Research Foundation, AMREF, and still worked as an accountant up-to 2010 when he resigned to join elective politics.

=== Political ===
In 2011, Musasizi bid for the Rubanda County East parliamentary seat on the NRM ticket, and went on to win in both the party’s primaries and in the general elections and became a member of Uganda's 9th Parliament. In 2016, Musasizi won re-election and continued to serve the constituents of Rubanda County East in the 10th Parliament of the Republic of Uganda. In the 9th Parliament, Musasizi served on the Public Accounts Committee. In the 10th Parliament of Uganda, he was the chairperson of the Committee on Finance, Planning and Economic Development and is a member of the Business Committee.

On June 8, 2021, Musasizi was appointed by H.E. Yoweri Museveni as the State Minister of Finance, Planning and Economic Development in charge of General Duties. In this role, he supervised budget implementation, debt management, and fiscal transfers to local governments. Musasizi contested again in the 2026 general election for the Rubanda East county Parliament seat and won defeating independent Kenneth Jogo Biryabarema, former district LC5 chairperson, who garnered 15,961 votes. Jasper Ayebare (DF) got 42 votes, while Collins Victor Atuheire (independent) received 131 votes.

In May 2026, as part of a major cabinet reshuffle ahead of the 2026–2031 political term, President Museveni elevated Musasizi to the full Cabinet position of Minister of Finance, Planning and Economic Development, replacing long-serving minister Matia Kasaija. On 11 June 2026, Musasizi delivered his first national budget at Kololo Ceremonial Grounds, projecting Uganda's economy to grow at 10.2% in FY 2026/27 — the country's fastest projected growth in decades — driven by the commencement of commercial oil production and a resurgent tourism sector.

== See also ==
- Parliament of Uganda
- Kabale District
- National Resistance Movement
