= Tereza Mbire =

Ugandan entrepreneur

- Tereza Kabahita Mbire
- Born: 25 December 1934 (age 91)
- Other name: Mama Mbire
- Citizenship: Ugandan
- Education: Butare Primary School; Rushoroza Girls' School
- Alma mater: Kinyamasika Teachers college Tadmora hotel (Tel Aviv)
- Occupations: Entrepreneur, presidential advisor, advocate, teacher
- Known for: Co-founder of Uganda Women's Finance and Credit Trust; Founder of Uganda Women Entrepreneurs' Association Ltd. (UWEAL)
- Spouse: Possiano Mbire (died 1985)
- Children: 6 (including Charles Mbire)
- Awards: Honorary doctorate (Nkumba University, 2008); World of Difference Award; Knight of the Order of St. Sylvester (2021)

Tereza Mbire (also known as Mama Mbire; born 25 December 1934) is a Ugandan entrepreneur, presidential advisor and advocate. She is a co-founder of the Uganda Women's Finance and Credit Trust and founder of the Uganda Women Entrepreneurs' Association Ltd.

== Biography ==
Mbire started her studies at Butare Primary School and went to Rushoroza Girls' School for secondary school. She later trained as a teacher at Kinyamasika Teachers college. Mbire started her first business at 19 as a primary school teacher in Kabale district, making dresses after school for sale.

She left her teaching job to take advantage of the scholarship Israel was offering for people training in hotel management. She spent 2 years in Israel, receiving a diploma in hotel and tourism management from Tel Aviv's Tadmora hotel.After returning from Israel, Mbire became the first African executive housekeeper at the Apollo Hotel (now known as the Sheraton Hotel in Kampala), where she worked until 1973. She later joined Uganda Hotels and became a nationwide trainer for three years.

Mbire has a professorship recognition from United Graduate and Seminar of America and was also a recipient of an honorary doctorate from Nkumba University in 2008.

Furthermore, she started a flower shop, Kampala florist, becoming Uganda's first and only florist for close to 15 years.

She later opened a garments' industry called Pop-in industry, a factory that tailored women's clothes, but was forced to change business after Idi Amin's soldiers looted 100 sewing machines and rendered 200 workers and Mbire jobless.

Mbire started "Home pride", a bakery that was the first to introduce sliced bread in Uganda.

She later went into interior design with "Habitat interiors" by capitalizing on her experience arranging rooms at Sheraton Hotel.

Mbire, alongside Ms Ida Wanendeya, Justice Mary Maitun, and Ms Mary Mulumba, co-founded the Uganda Women's Finance and credit Trust with a mission to offer collateral free loans to low income earners and more particularly women who had no collateral.

Mbire received a global recognition Award for leading women entrepreneurs of the world from the star group of America and was recipient of the World of Difference Award at the International Global Alliance of Women Global Forum in Washington DC.

She was also knighted by Pope Francis in 2021 for her work in the Catholic Church.

== Personal life ==
Tereza Mbire was married to Possiano Mbire with whom she had 6 children and 10 grandchildren. Her husband died in 1985.

The song "Maama Mbire" by Bobi Wine and Juliana Kanyomozi was a dedication from her son Charles Mbire to celebrate her 70th birthday in 2004.
