= Muhanga (disambiguation) =

Muhanga is a city in Rwanda.

Muhanga may also refer to:

- A.S. Muhanga, an association football club based in Muhanga, Rwanda
- Muhanga District in Rwanda
- Commune of Muhanga in northern Burundi
- Kayanja Muhanga (born 1965), Ugandan military officer
- Muhanga, Rukiga, a town in Rukiga District, Western Region, Uganda
