= Festo Karwemera =

Ugandan historian and curator

- Born: 1925; Kabale, Uganda
- Died: 27 August 2020 (aged 94–95); Rugarama, Kabale
- Other name: Omugurusi Festo Karwemera Mwene Karagare Kabure-Nkeecwere
- Occupations: Teacher, historian, curator, author
- Years active: 1955–2020
- Known for: The Home of Edirisa Museum
- Spouse: Aidah Mary Ziryabura

Festo Karwemera (also referred to as Omugurusi Festo Karwemera Mwene Karagare Kabure-Nkeecwere; 1925 – 27 August 2020) was a Ugandan historian, cultural activist and teacher. As an author he was known for primarily documenting and writing in the Runyankore-Rukiga language. He was also credited as the founder and curator of the Bakiga Cultural Museum in Kabale.

== Background and education ==
Karwemera was born to a cleric, Karagare Kabure-Nkeecwere in Karubanda village, Buhara sub county, Kabale District in 1925.

He attended Muyebe Sub Selected Grade School, Kinyasano Junior Primary School and Kigyezi High School. After leaving junior high school in 1944, Karwemera enrolled at Nyakasura Vernacular Teacher Training College qualifying as a teacher of vernacular. He also qualified as a Grade II teacher from Bishop Tucker Teachers College in Mukono.

== Career ==
In 1955, Karwemera worked as a head teacher at Katare Primary School and was then promoted to Assistant Education Supervisor for Anglican Church Schools in Kigezi District in 1959. Between 1964 and 1965, he worked as a head teacher at Hornby High School in Kabale, Uganda.

In 1966, the Diocese of Kigezi appointed him to serve as the Kigezi regional chairperson for the Save The Children Fund. Between 1970 and 1972, he was the head of the National Trading Corporation in Kabale.

In the 1980s he served in various positions in local government such as the head of Kabale District Service Commission. He was the head Kabale Town Council when it was transformed into a municipality during this time.

As a private businessman, he was a grain trader.

== Legacy ==
Karwemera founded the Bakiga Cultural Museum in Kabale (sometimes referred to as The Home of Edirisa Museum or locally Akehongo Kabaana Ba Karwemera (Karwemera's Children's Hiding Place)).

In June 2017, he was awarded an honorary doctorate in literature by Kabale University for promoting culture.

== Personal life ==
Karwemera was married to Aidah Mary Ziryabura.

He died on 27 August 2020 with the cause of death given as multiple organ failure.

== Publications ==
Karwemera authored a number of publications in the Runyakore – Rukiga language such as

- 1966 – Otebwa Orurimi Rwawe, (Don't forget your language)
- 1975 – Shutama nkuteekyerereze
- 1980 – Ija twevugye
- 1994 – Emicwe n'emigyenzo y’aBakiga (Values and Norms Of Bakiga)
- 1995 – Empandiika ya Runyankore-Rukiga: egufuhaziibwe
- 2008 – Encuukye Tushome Tujerenge
- 2012 – Katondoozi y'orunyankore-Rukiga: Thesaurus of Runyankore-Rukiga (co-authored with Yoweri Museveni et al.)

=== Translations ===
Karwerwa is credited for his work and contributions to:

- The 1995 Constitution of Uganda to Rukiga – Runyakore;
- The English Bible to Rukiga – Runyankore;

== See also ==
- Kabale District
