= Catheline Ndamira =

Ugandan businesswoman and politician

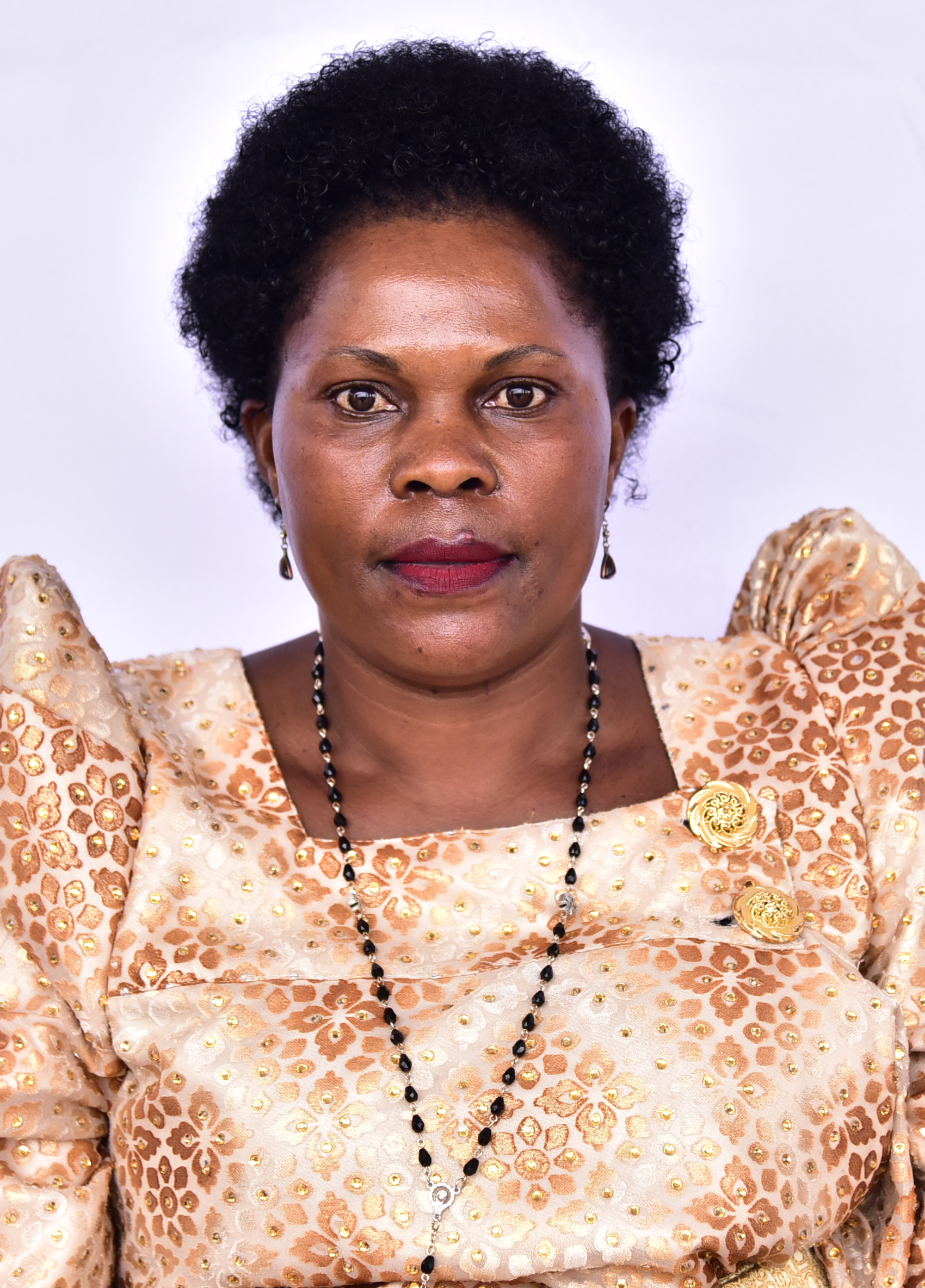
- Born: 13 August 1977 (age 49); Kabale District
- Education: Rubirizi S.S.S
- Alma mater: Makerere University Business School (certificate in business administration); Uganda Martyrs University (Bachelor of Business Administration and Management)
- Occupation: politician

Catheline Ndamira is a Ugandan businesswoman and politician who has also been the Kabale District woman representative a position she has held since 2016.

== Background and education ==
She was born on 13 August 1977. Catheline Ndamira attended Rubirizi S.S.S. for her high school education. She studied Business at Makerere University Business School, graduating with the certificate in business administration in 2008, She went on to obtain a diploma from Makerere University Business School, in Kampala in 2010. In 2014, she obtained a Bachelor of Business Administration and Management from the Uganda Martyrs University.

== Work experience ==
Between 2010 and 2015 she worked as a financial Administrator at VIDAS ENGINEERING SERVICES CO. LTD

Following the February 2016 general election, Catheline Ndamira Atwakiire was unanimously elected as Kabale District woman representative on 2016.

== Parliamentary duties ==
Besides her duties as a member of the Ugandan Parliament, she sits on the following parliamentary committees:

- Public Accounts Committee member
- committee on health- Member
