= Herbert Kabafunzaki =

Ugandan politician

State Minister for Labor, Employment and Industrial Relations Cabinet of Uganda

Personal details
- Born: Herbert Kabafunzaki; 9 December 1975 (age 50) Uganda
- Citizenship: Uganda
- Spouse: Mrs. Kabafunzaki
- Occupation: Politician
- Known for: Politics

Herbert Kabafunzaki is a Ugandan businessman and politician, who has served as State Minister for Labor, Employment and Industrial Relations since June 2016. He was sworn in with the rest of the cabinet on 22 June 2016.

Kabafunzaki is the elected Member of Parliament for Rubanda County, in Kabale District and a member of Uganda's ruling party, the National Resistance Movement.

== Early life and education ==
He was born in Rwamucucu sub-county, in Rukiga County, in Rukiga District, in the Western Region of Uganda.He attended St. Mary's College Rushoroza for secondary education.

== Political career ==
Prior to his election to the parliament in 2016, he served on Wakiso District Local Council as the elected representative for Makindye A Zone (today known as Ssabagabo), from 2011 until 2016 and was later arrested for collecting a bribe of five million Uganda shillings from ceo of AYA group Uganda .

== Other considerations ==
Kabafunzaki is reported to have served as the chief executive officer of Berteeen Business Systems, a Ugandan enterprise. He has also served in the past as a national delegate of the Federation of Uganda Football Associations, the ruling soccer body in the country.

== See also ==
- Cabinet of Uganda
- Kabale District
