= Adungu =

Stringed musical instrument of the Acholi people of Northern Uganda

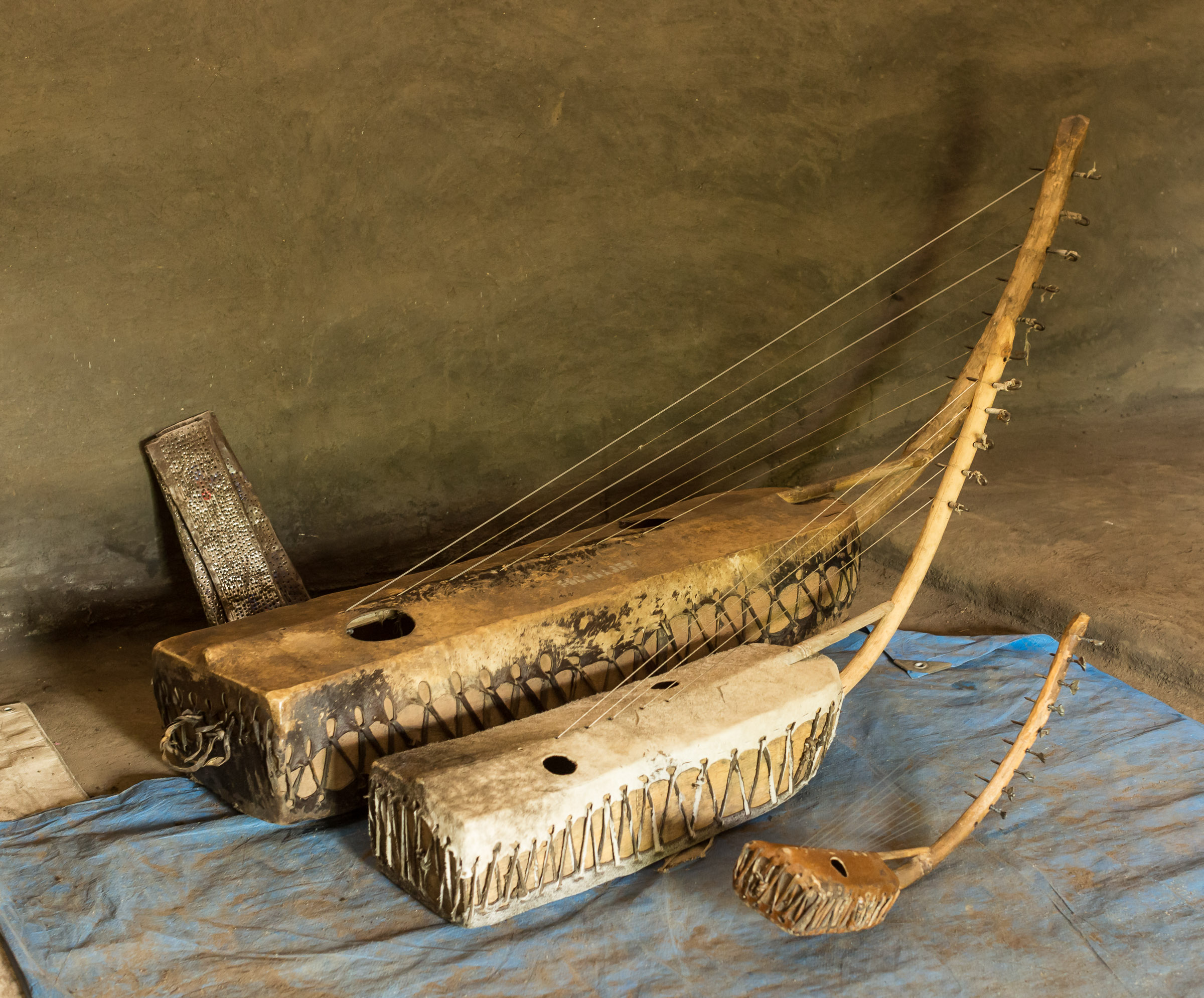
Three different sizes of adungu in a Baptist church in Adjumani Settlement in northwestern Uganda.

The Adungu, also called the Endongo or Ennanga or Bow harp in English, is a traditional stringed musical instrument of the Acholi people of Northern Uganda and the Alur people of northwestern Uganda. It is an arched harp of varying dimensions, ranging from six to ten strings or more.

== Physical description and construction ==
The physical form of the a'dungu African harp derives from uniquely African origins.

The adungu is characterized by its distinctive arched design, featuring a hollowed-out wooden body covered with cow leather as a soundboard. Nylon strings (traditionally gut or sinew) pass through the soundboard to tuning pegs housed in a curved wooden branch or frame. The instrument comes in various sizes, from smaller instruments played close to the body to larger bass adungu on which the player can sit. The construction involves an eight-stringed configuration attached inside a wooden-built hollow semi-circular resonating chamber with an animal skin cover on top. The larger adungu instruments are known for creating an incredibly rich, bass sound that forms the foundation of traditional Ugandan music ensembles.

== Cultural Significance and Musical Tradition ==
The adungu is an open harp chordophone that has deep cultural significance among the Nilo-Saharan-speaking peoples of northwestern Uganda. The instrument became somewhat nationalized during the politically tumultuous period beginning in the 1960s when it and other traditional instruments began to be taught to school children around Uganda as part of cultural preservation efforts.

The physical form of the adungu derives from uniquely African origins and represents centuries of musical tradition among the Alur and Acholi peoples. Different ethnic groups have their own names for similar instruments: in the Teso region, it is called Adungu, while the Baganda call it Ennanga.

The musical form commonly known as adungu music today, is tuned to the diatonic major scale of classic European music and bears the influence of the British presence in Uganda. Traditionally the Adungu is tuned to a pentatonic scale within both the Acholi and Alur cultures. The a'dungu may be played alone, in an ensemble, or as vocal accompaniment. The instrument appears in various sizes that can be loosely categorized into soprano, alto, tenor, and bass.

== Tuning and Playing Technique ==
Adungu instruments are typically tuned diatonically, allowing for the performance of both traditional folk melodies and more complex musical arrangements. The tuning is achieved through large nails or pegs that secure and adjust the tension of the strings. This tuning system, while effective, has occasionally presented challenges for musicians traveling with the instrument due to the appearance of the large tuning nails.

The playing technique varies depending on the size of the instrument. Smaller adungu are held close to the body and played with both hands, while larger bass instruments allow the musician to sit and play with greater leverage for the deeper, more resonant tones.

A'dungus are often played in quartets or quintets. The strings of the bass a'dungu are tuned only to the pitches of the tonic triad, and more notes can be played by placing the finger on a string any distance from the neck to raise the pitch. The tenor, alto, and soprano a'dungus are tuned to the pitches of a diatonic major scale. The bass and tenor instruments are played on the ground, while the alto and soprano are played held against the chest.

Tuning is not standardized, and players will usually tune by ear to each other shortly before a performance. The a'dungus are not in a particular key, and the tonality can be adapted to the preferences of the performers.

The a'dungu is generally not used melodically, and instead outlines chords. Generally, a single note is played at a time on the bass and tenor instruments, while the alto and soprano a'dungus are used to play triads. In performance, complex arpeggiation gives simple tonal chord progressions an energetic, sometimes syncopated rhythmic drive.

Modern performers adept with the adungu include the native Ugandan musician James Makubuya and the American artist Crystal Bright.
