= Jack Sabiiti =

Ugandan lecturer, public administrator and politician

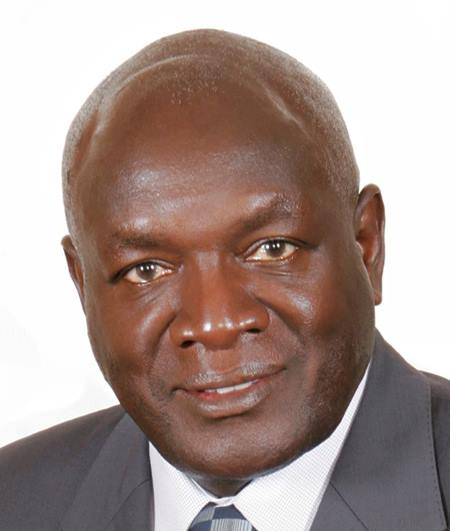

Honorable

Personal details
- Born: Jack Sabiiti; 27 April 1947 (age 79) Kabale, Uganda
- Education: Makerere University (Bachelor of Arts); Dalhousie University (Master of Public Administration)
- Occupation: Administrator, politician
- Known for: Public administration, politics

Jack Crissy Sabiiti (born 27 April 1947) is a Ugandan lecturer, public administrator and politician. He is the former Member of Parliament for Rukiga County, Kigezi sub-region and a founding member of FDC, an opposition party in Uganda. He was the first treasurer general of FDC and now serves as the party's treasurer for Kabale District.

He represented the constituents of Rukiga County in the 7th & 9th Parliaments and as a member of the constituent assembly that promulgated the 1995 Constitution of the Republic of Uganda. In the 9th Parliament, he served as the chairperson of the Committee on Public Service and Local Government and as a member of the Budget Committee whereas in the 7th Parliament, he was the vice chairperson of the Public Accounts Committee and a member of both the Budget Committee and the Committee on Foreign Affairs.

== Early life and education ==
Sabiiti was born in Mparo Parish, Rwamucucu Sub-county, Kabale District on 27 April 1947 in an Anglican family of the Bakiga. He is the second of five children and a brother to the late Dr. Jimmy Kamugisha. His father, Festo Bakainaga was an agricultural extension worker and his mother, Tabitha Rwomushana, a nurse. His paternal grandfather, Sirasi Kikooko, was a Gombolola chief and his maternal grandfather, Tomasi Rwomushana, a Saza chief.

He received his primary education in his home district of Kabale at Kihanga Primary School and Nyakisoroza Primary School where he was a prefect and once led a demonstration against a teacher of arithmetic who apparently "was not up to the job". He attained his PLE certification in 1961 and then joined Kigezi High School where he first met Bank of Uganda governor Emmanuel Tumusiime-Mutebile and attained a Junior Secondary School Certificate in 1963.

In 1964, he joined Old Kampala Senior Secondary School for his senior school education, attaining a UCE certification in 1967 and a UACE certification in 1969. At the public high school, he was a student leader, the chairperson of the school debating society and a member of the drama club.

Sabiiti further advanced to Makerere University where he had a failed bid at the guild presidency and graduated in 1973 with a Bachelor of Arts in Political science and Public administration. In 1977, he joined Dalhousie University on a scholarship and attained a Master of Public Administration in 1978. At the Canadian institution, he was a member of International Students Committee.

In 1982, Sabiiti trained as a military officer in Libya during the Ugandan Bush War and over the years, he acquired various certifications that included among others, the following: a policies and management of state oil and mining industries certificate from Duke University in 1993; a project appraisals and analysis certificate from American University in 1994; a result oriented management certificate from Uganda Management Institute (UMI) in 1998; a procurement and financial management certificate from the Eastern and Southern African Management Institute (ESAMI) in 1999; a local government finance and management certificate from the Institute for Public-Private Partnerships (IP3) in 2003 and a local environmental management certificate from LIFE Academy in 2005.

== Career and politics ==
After attaining his bachelor's degree in 1973, Sabiiti worked as an administrative officer in the Ministry of Local Government, the Ministry of Defense and the Office of the President. He also served as a district commissioner in the former districts of Acholi, Bukedi and Madi up until 1981.

During the Resistance War of the early 80s, he immigrated to Nairobi and worked as a part-time lecturer for human resource and finance management at the University of Nairobi (UoN) and as a finance and administration manager with C. A. Libirds & Associates, up until 1984 when he secured employment as a full-time lecturer at USIU Africa.

In 1985, Sabiiti served as the spokesperson for Uganda Freedom Movement (UFM) during the peace talks that led to the drafting of the 1985 Nairobi Agreement. In the same year, he moved to Netherlands with his family and worked as a finance and administration manager for the Netherlands Refugee Foundation. On his return, he served as a board member for National Water and Sewerage Corporation (NWSC) from 1988 to 1995 and as a member of the constituent assembly that ushered in the 1995 Constitution of Uganda.

From 1995 to 1998, he further served as a board member of the National Environmental Management Authority (NEMA) and then worked as Undersecretary for the Ministry of Land, Water and Environment, the Ministry of Energy and the Ministry of Justice and Constitutional Affairs up until 2001 when he was elected Member of Parliament for Rukiga County in the 7th Parliament of Uganda.

In the year 2002, after the 2001 elections, Sabiiti and a few others lobbied Parliament to set up a committee for investigating the violence that had marred the 2001 presidential and parliamentary elections. In 2005, as the vice chairperson of PAC, he initiated a bill that led to the independence of the Office of the Auditor General from the executive.

On losing his reelection bid in the 2006 general elections, Sabiiti was hired as a consultant for International Republican Institute (IRI) in 2007. Between 2008 and 2010, he worked as a full-time lecturer of political economy at Kampala International University (KIU).

In 2011, he rejoined parliament still as a representative for the constituents of Rukiga County. In the 9th Parliament, he served as the chairperson of the Local Government Accounts Committee, a member of the Finance & Budget Committee and as the Shadow Minister of Public Service.

In 2016, he lost in his reelection bid to Herbert Kabafunzaki and now works as a full-time lecturer at Kampala international University and among other assignments, serves as the current FDC treasurer for Kabale District.

== Personal details ==
Jack Sabiiti is married to Stella Mystica Sabiiti and they have four children: Ritah Asiimwe Sabiiti, Moses Rwomushana Sabiiti, Jason Ntaro Sabiiti and Tabitha Kentaro Sabiiti. He is the patron of Old Kampala Students Association and also serves on the National Water Board. He is close friends with Dr. Ruhakana Rugunda, Gen. Moses Ali and Professor Tumusiime Mutebire.

== See also ==
- Kabale District
- Forum for Democratic Change
- Parliament of Uganda
