= Muhanga, Rukiga =

Muhanga
- Location in Uganda
- Coordinates: 01°10′16″S 30°07′27″E
- Country: Uganda
- Region: Western Uganda
- Sub-region: Kigezi sub-region
- District: Rukiga District
- Established: 1 July 2010

Government
  - Mayor: James Twijukye

Population (2014 Census)
  - Total: 11,706

Muhanga is a town in the Western Region of Uganda. It is the main commercial centre and largest town of Rukiga District. However, the district headquarters are located at Mparo.

== Location ==
Muhanga is located on the Mbarara-Ntungamo-Kabale-Katuna Road, about 43 kilometres (27 mi), southwest of Ntungamo, the nearest large town on the road from Katuna to Mbarara. This is about 35.5 kilometres (22 mi), by road, northeast of Kabale, the largest city in the Kigezi sub-region. Muhanga is approximately 374 kilometres (232 mi), by road, southwest of Kampala, the largest city and capital of Uganda. The geographical coordinates of Muhanga, Rukiga are: 01°10'16.0"S, 30°07'27.0"E (Latitude:-1.171111; Longitude:30.124167).

== Overview ==
The town is subdivided into several wards, including (a) Muhanga Central (b) Butare (c) Highland (d) Nyakabungo and (e) Rutare. Muhanga became a town council in 2010. Prior to that, it was a trading center, established in the 1970s. Due to its proximity to the international border with Rwanda, smuggling of goods across the common border has contributed to its rapid growth. The smuggling has since stopped, according to James Tumwijukye, the town's current mayor.

== Population ==
According to the Uganda Bureau of Statistics (UBOS), as of the August 2014 national census and household survey, Muhanga Town Council comprised 2,766 households. The average family size was 4.1, with a total of 5,87 males and 5,859 females in the town. The total population of the town at that time was 11,706 people.

== Points of interest ==
Muhanga has a central fresh produce market that opens daily. The town is also home to Bukinda Primary Teacher’s College, eight primary schools and six secondary schools.
