= Mathew Rukikaire =

Ugandan academic

The Honourable Canon Mathew Rukikaire

Chancellor of Kabale University

Member of the Uganda Parliament for Rukungiri District
- In office 1996–2001

Personal details
- Born: 14 October 1938 (age 88) Uganda
- Citizenship: Uganda
- Education: Makerere University
- Occupation: Politician, veterinarian, academic, university administrator

Matthew Rukikaire (born 14 October 1938), is a Ugandan politician and university administrator who serves as the Chancellor of Kabale University. He was a member of the sixth Parliament of Uganda.

== Early life and education background ==
Rukikaire was born on 14 October 1938 in Kabale District to Ernest Nyabagabo and Enid Kagore. He attended Kigezi High School (lower school), Seseme Primary School and Nyakatare Primary School for his primary education and Ntare School for his secondary education. He was Head Prefect of Ntare School during his time there.

He attended King's College Budo for his A-Level studies, where he was also Head Prefect. Rukikaire later joined Makerere University, where he was elected Gulid President in 1962, the year Uganda gained Independence from the UK.

== Career ==
Rukikaire served as the Secretary of the Uganda People's Congress and as Secretary of the East African Industrial Board. He also stood for member of parliament for Rujumbura County in Rukungiri District. In addition, he served as chairman of the board of directors of the National Bank of Commerce and worked as a government economist, East Africa to the European Economic Commission in Brussels.

He served as a regional trading manager for Shell International. He was also Minister of State for Finance, Planning, and Economic Development in charge of Privatisation in the 1990s. He was appointed Chancellor of Kabale University in October 2025 by President Yoweri Museveni. In addition, Rukikaire is the author of 70 Years a Witnes.

== Awards ==
Matthew Rukikaire was awarded the Nalubaale Medal of Honour, and was also the Order of Merit by King's College Budo.

== See also ==
- Mondo Kagonyera
- Crispus Kiyonga
- John Ssebuwufu
- Ruhakana Rugunda
