= Charles Mbire =

Ugandan entrepreneur

- Born: 1959 (age 66–67); Mparo, Rukiga District; Uganda
- Citizenship: Uganda
- Education: Essex University (Bachelor of Science in Economics); Leicester University (Master of Business Administration)
- Occupations: Chairman, MTN Uganda; Eskom Uganda; Uganda Securities Exchange; Director, Rift Valley Railways
- Years active: 1980s–present

Charles Magezi Mbire is a Ugandan businessman, entrepreneur, and industrialist in. He was reported to be the wealthiest indigenous Ugandan, with an estimated net worth exceeding US$200 million, as of January 2012.

== Early life and education ==
Mbire Charles Magezi was born in 1959 to Ponsiano Mbire, and Thereza Mbire in Mparo, Rukiga District, southwestern Uganda. He is the third-born in the family, with three sisters, two of them older than him, and two younger brothers.

He attended Kabale Primary School and Kitante Primary School for his elementary education. He studied at St. Mary's College Kisubi for his O-Level education. He then attended Namasagali College for his A-Level studies. He studied business and economics and graduated with the honors degree of Bachelor of Science, from Essex University in England. He went on to obtain a Master of Business Administration from Leicester University.

His investments are in energy, finance, real estate, telecommunications, pharmaceuticals, agribusiness, and transportation.

== Business interests ==
Mbire is part owner and/or member of the board of directors of the following Ugandan businesses:

- Afro Alpine Pharma Limited
- East Africa Fish Farming Limited
- Eskom Uganda Limited
- Invesco (Uganda) Limited
- MTN Uganda Limited
- Polino Holdings Limited
- Sunco Investments Limited
- Bomi Holdings Limited
- Rift Valley Railways
- Chui Investments Limited - an investment company specializing in the construction, operations and ownership of small and medium-sized power stations in Uganda
- Bank of Baroda

== Other responsibilities ==
Mbire was appointed chairman of the Uganda Securities Exchange in 2010. He is also a member of the Presidential Investor Roundtable, an elite group of businesspeople who advise the President of Uganda on how to improve business competitiveness and business conditions in the country. He was appointed by Minister of Health to Malaria Free Uganda Board (A PPP initiative of Ministry of health and private sector), a group of senior multisectoral leaders formed to advocate and mobilize resources for malaria elimination, in October 2026.

== Net worth ==
In December 2008, it was estimated that Mbire's net worth exceeded US$65 million. In January 2012, his net worth was estimated to have increased to over US$200 million. In January 2019, he was estimated to be worth US$400 million.
