= World Vision Uganda =

Christian non-governmental organization in Uganda

- Formation: 1986
- Location: Nakasero-Kampala, Uganda
- Parent organization: World Vision International

World Vision Uganda is a Christian Non-Governmental Organization and a branch of World Vision International committed to addressing poverty through relief, development, and advocacy programs. It was started in Uganda in 1986 to offer relief, and resettlement packages as well as help reconstruct the districts in central Uganda affected by the Ugandan Bush War of 1981-1986.

== History ==
World Vision was founded in 1950 by Bob Fierce to protect and care for children and those in need and operates in about 100 countries worldwide.

== Program area of focus ==
=== Education ===
The vision of the child protection program is to build communities' capacity to protect and heal children, preparing them for a better future. Its goal is to increase positive relationships between children, their families, and the community in general and the target stakeholders include parents and caregivers, most vulnerable boys and girls, faith-based and cultural leaders, teachers, civil society organizations, government, and non-governmental organizations.

=== Clean water, sanitation, and hygiene ===
Advocate for and provide access to clean water, sanitation, and hygiene to children, their families, and education institutions to promote child good health and education and give parents ample time dedicated to income-generating activities.

=== Economic development ===
This aims to elevate poverty by offering training to smallholder farmers on sustainable agriculture and natural resource management techniques and establishing saving groups for easy access to credit funds for improved rural livelihoods.

=== Education ===
The goal is to provide quality, include, save, and transformative education to vulnerable children through providing reading materials for children with disabilities, girl child education programs, training of teachers, and community literacy facilitators.

=== Health and nutrition ===
The program provides food and medical support to breastfeeding mothers, treatment of children against communicable diseases like Tuberculosis, and support to community health workers.

== Location ==
World Vision Uganda is located on Plot 15B, Nakasero Road, P.O Box 5319, Kampala, Uganda.
