= Columbia Film Society =

American nonprofit organization

Coordinates: 33.998219°N 81.032447°W

The Columbia Film Society is a nonprofit organization founded in January 1979 in Columbia, South Carolina. It is a community arts organization whose aim is to stimulate discussion and enhance appreciation of media arts in the community by presenting a wide variety of alternative films and sponsoring media arts events and educational programs.

The Society is mostly known for operating the Nickelodeon Theatre, a 77-seat storefront venue located in the shadow of the state capitol building. Using this current home, the Society showcases films and videos found outside the commercial cinemas in the area. In June 2005 the Society (along with the help of private citizens, corporate sponsors and other civic organizations including the City of Columbia) purchased the historic former Fox Theater, a 1936 Art Deco cinema, to use as a future home for the Society. This facility will offer two theaters for programs.
