= Augustus Nuwagaba =

Ugandan economist

- Born: 1964 (age 61–62); Uganda
- Citizenship: Uganda
- Education: Makerere University (Doctor of Philosophy in economics, inclusion, and poverty eradication); London School of Economics (Master of Science); Eastern and Southern African Management Institute (Master of Business Administration in Monetary Policy and Commercial Bank competitiveness)
- Occupation: Economic transformation consultant
- Years active: 1986–present
- Known for: Specialized consulting services
- Title: Global economist
- Spouse: Lillian Nuwagaba

Augustus Nuwagaba is the Deputy governor of the Central Bank of Uganda and an international consultant on economic transformation. He is a wealth creation expert in Africa. He has an MBA in application of central bank monetary policy on commercial bank competitiveness. Nuwagaba has worked intensively in analysis of fiscal metrics for governments in Africa, review of financial performance and analysis of tax policies. He works as the managing consultant at REEV Consult International Limited, a private consultancy firm, incorporated in Uganda. He was Consultant for the African Peer Review Mechanism under NEPAD, was a member of the African Regional Panel of Experts on Development. Nuwagaba is a member of the World Bank Consultative Group that developed the African Plan of Action. He was the team leader of FINSCOPE - Financial Penetration Project (2013). He was a team leader for Developing Financial Management and Training manual for Parliamentary Accountability Committees, member of audit committee of the Ministry of Finance Planning and Economic Development of the Republic of Uganda, winner of International Award for significant Contribution to World Society. In addition, he was a consultant for mid-term review of the National Development Plan for the Republic of Uganda (2010–2014). He is a consultant for formulating the East African Community development investment plan (2016-2020). Nuwagaba is a regular speaker at the induction of members of parliament of Uganda.

== Background and education ==
He was born in 1964 in Kabale Municipality in the Western Region of Uganda, the sixth-born in a family of seven siblings. His father died when Nuwagaba was four years old, so he was raised by his mother, who died when Nuwagaba was in Senior 2, at the age of 16.

He attended Kigezi High School from 1979 to 1985, serving as head prefect during his stay. In 1986. he entered Makerere University faculty of Social Sciences, graduating in 1989. Later he graduated from the London School of Economics with the degree of Master of Science. He returned to Makerere University and pursued studies leading to the award of the degree of Doctor of Philosophy. His field of specialization for his doctorate degree was Economics, Inclusive growth and Poverty Eradication. He also holds the degree of Master of Business Administration obtained from the Eastern and Southern African Management Institute majoring in monetary policy and commercial bank competitiveness.

== Career ==
Nuwagaba has been a member of the teaching staff at Makerere University, since he returned from his master's degree studies in London in the early 2000s. He serves as the chairperson of the Makerere University Academic Staff Association. He also serves as the Managing Consultant at Reev Consult International Limited, a private consultancy firm, incorporated in Uganda in 2000. The company offers consultancy services in the areas of impact assessments, planning, social policy analysis, management services and institutional development services. The overall objective of the company is to achieve capacity development and poverty reduction in the geographical areas that they serve. Over the years, Reev Consult has provided consultancy services to International organizations including the World Bank, European Union, UNDP, USAID, DFID, UNFPA, DANIDA; SNV, IDRC, African governments, CSOs and the private sector. He has been a keynote speaker at both National and International level (Uganda celebrating 50 year, Dublin International conference, Orienting of 9th and 10th parliament of Uganda).

== Personal details ==
Augustus Nuwagaba has been married to Lillian Nuwagaba since 1997. Together they are the parents of four children. He is Christian. He is a Rotarian with Rotary Club of Muyenga district 9211 (Major Donor). He was the 34th President of the club serving in the Rotary year 2021-2022.

== Authorship ==
Over the years he has authored and co-authored a number of publications in a various international journals;

- Dualism in Kampala: Squalid Slums in a Royal Realm. Published in African Urban Economies.
- Toward Addressing Skills Development and Employment Crisis in Uganda: The Role of Public Private Partnerships.
- Urbanisation and Environmental Crisis in A Ugandan City: Implications for Environment Management and Sustainable Development.
- Population Crisis in Sub-Saharan Africa: Who is Responsible? An Illustrative Analysis of Population Trends in Uganda.
- The Impact of Macro-adjustment Programmes on Housing Investment in Kampala City - Uganda: Shelter Implications for the Urban Poor.
- Who Is Growing?: Ending Inequality in Uganda: A Study of the Drivers of Inequality in Uganda.
