= Kigezi High School =

Coordinates: 01°14′25″S 29°58′59″E

- Kabale, Kabale District; Uganda

Information
- Type: Public High School (12-18)
- Motto: I Serve
- Established: 1922
- Athletics: track, tennis, volleyball, basketball, netball, cricket and football.
- Nickname: Shanka
- Website: www.kigezihigh.sc.ug

Kigezi High School, is a mixed, boarding high school in Kabale, Kabale District, Western Uganda.

== Location ==
The school is located off the Kabale-Kisoro Road on a hill called Rugarama, approximately 10 kilometres (6.2 mi), by road, northwest of the central business district of the town of Kabale. The coordinates of Kigezi High School are:1°14'25.0"S, 29°58'59.0"E (Latitude:-1.240278; Longitude:29.983056).

== History ==
The school was founded by the Church Missionary Society, in 1922. It affiliated with Kigezi Diocese of the Church of Uganda. The school made 100 years in existence in 2022.

== Notable alumni ==
- Emmanuel Tumusiime-Mutebile - Economist and banker. Governor of the Bank of Uganda (2001 to 2022), Chancellor, International University of East Africa (since 2014).
- Ruhakana Rugunda - Physician, politician, and diplomat. Prime Minister 2014 to 2021. Former Minister of Health of Uganda from May 2013 to September 2014. Former Minister of Information Communication Technology from 2011 until 2003. Former Uganda's Permanent Representative at the United Nations, from January 2009 until May 2011.
- Mildred Barya - Author, poet, and journalist.
- Kiiza Besigye - Physician, politician, and former military officer in the Uganda People's Defence Force. Former president of the Forum for Democratic Change political party. Contestant in Uganda's 2001, 2006, and 2011 presidential elections. Lost all of them.
- Pamela Mbabazi - university professor, academic, and academic administrator
- Augustus Nuwagaba - Social Worker, academic, researcher, and university professor. Associate professor of social work, population studies, and poverty eradication in the Department of Social Work and Social Administration at Makerere University.
- Abed Bwanika - Veterinarian, politician, and pastor. Two-time former presidential candidate. President of the People's Development Party.
- Philemon Mateke - Ugandan politician and academic. He has been the State Minister of Foreign Affairs for Regional Affairs since March 2015.
- Mwesigwa Rukutana - lawyer and politician
- Jack Sabiiti - lecturer, public administrator and politician

== See also ==
- Education in Uganda
- Kabale District
