= Shem Bageine =

Ugandan politician

Shem Bajura Bageine is a Ugandan politician and former Cabinet Minister who has played a notable role in regional diplomacy and national politics. He is the former Minister of State for East African Affairs in the Ugandan Cabinet. He was appointed to that position on 1 March 2015. On account of being a Cabinet minister, Shem Bageine is also an ex officio Member of Parliament by virtue of his ministerial position.

== Political career ==
Bageine has had a long involvement in public service in Uganda: Minister of State for East African Affairs where he was appointed to this position on 1 March 2015. In this role, he represented Uganda in matters related to the East African Community (EAC) a regional intergovernmental organisation focused on economic and political intergraton among partner states.

At East African Legislative Assembly (EALA), according to his involvement in EAC affairs, Bageine served as an ex-folio member of the EALA during the 3rd Assembly(2012-2017) reflecting his role in shaping regional policies and cooperation.

At the Parliament of Uganda, according to the position he was holding at the ministerial office, Bageine served as an ex-folio Member of Parliament during the 9th Parliament of Uganda (2011-2017).

During his tenure, he participated in key regional discussions and was involved in presenting financing proposals for the EAC budget including engaging in negotiations on key issues such as EAC Monetary Union Protocol and measures to reduce non-tariff barriers to trade among member states. Parliamentary records and motions paying tribute to his leadership within EALA highlight his active participation in further integration objectives.

== Professional Life ==
Outside politics, Bageine has been known as a professional surveyor and is associated with Bageine & Company Ltd a real estate and property management firm in Kampala. He is listed as a registered surveyor in Uganda indicating his professional involvement in land economics and property valuation.

Bageine has also publicly supported cooperative banking initiatives as means of promoting saving culture and economic stability for ordinary Ugandans.

== Personal life ==
Bageine is a son to Shem Sabiti Bageine. Bageine was married to Elizabeth Wanjiru, Citizen Tv's 'Mother-in-Law' for 13 year before they divorced.

== See also ==
- Cabinet of Uganda
- Parliament of Uganda
- Government of Uganda
- East African Community
