= Rukiga District =

- District
- Interactive map of Rukiga District
- Coordinates: 1°11′S 30°06′E
- Country: Uganda
- Region: Western Uganda
- Sub-region: Kigezi sub-region
- Capital: Mparo

Area
  - Total: 426.3 km^{2} (164.6 sq mi)

Population (2014 census)
  - Total: 100,726
  - Density: 268/km^{2} (690/sq mi)
- Time zone: UTC+3 (EAT)
- Website: www.rukiga.go.ug

Rukiga District is a district in Western Uganda. Its capital is Mparo while Muhanga is the largest town.

== Location ==
Rukiga District is bordered by Ntungamo District to the east, the Republic of Rwanda to the southeast, Kabale District to the southwest, Rubanda District to the northwest and Rukungiri District to the north. Muhanga, the largest town in the district, is about 35.5 kilometres (22 mi), by road, northeast of Kabale, the largest city in Kigezi sub-region. This is about 43 kilometres (27 mi), by road, southwest of Ntungamo, along the Mbarara-Ntungamo-Kabale-Katuna Road. Muhanga is approximately 374 kilometres (232 mi), by road, southwest of Kampala, the largest city and capital of Uganda.

== Overview ==
As of August 2017, Rukiga District is made up of the following sub-counties: (a) Bukinda (b) Kamwezi (c) Kashambya and (d) Rwamucuucu. Muhanga Town Council completes the list of administrative subdivisions in Rukiga. Prior to 1 July 2017, Rukiga was a county in Kabale District.

The district is predominantly rural, with the majority of inhabitants engaged in agriculture. However, several urban centers exist in the district, including: (i) Mparo (ii) Muhanga (iii) Bukinda (iv) Kamwezi (v) Kangondo (vi) Sindi (vii) Rushebeya (viii) Kashumuuruzi (ix) Kitunga (x) Kantare (xi) Nyaruziba (The main trading center for Kashambya sub-county) (Xii) Kanyabugunga and (xiii) Rugoma.

The town of Mparo, where the district headquarters are located, became a town council on 1 July 2017, the day Rukiga attained district status.

== Population ==
The August 2014 national census and household survey enumerated the population in Rukiga District at 100,726 people.

== Economy ==
- Irish potatoes
- Beans
- maize
- Bananas
- Tourism
- Livestock Farming
- Trade and commerce

== Livestocks ==
- Cattle
- goat
- Sheep
- poultry

== See also ==
- Districts of Uganda
- Western Region, Uganda
