= Kigezi sub-region =

Ugandan sub-region

- Sub-region of Uganda
- Interactive map of Kigezi sub-region
- Coordinates: 1.2222°S 29.8889°E
- Country: Uganda
- Region: Western Region
- Districts: Kabale, Kanungu, Kisoro, Rubanda, Rukiga, Rukungiri
- Largest city: Kabale

Population (2024 census)
  - Total: 1,787,231
- 2014 census: 1,376,774
- Time zone: UTC+3 (EAT)

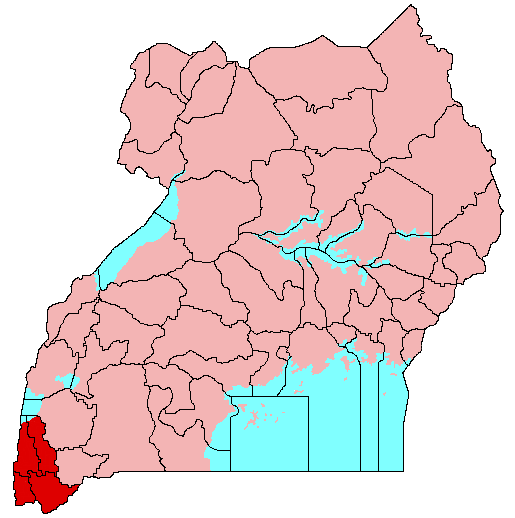
Kigezi (red)

Kigezi sub-region is a sub-region in the Western Region of Uganda. UBOS publishes district and lower-level profiles for Kigezi as one of Uganda’s sub-regions. The sub-region aligns with the historic Kigezi District area, later divided into multiple districts.

Kigezi sub-region consists of the following districts:

- Kabale District
- Kanungu District
- Kisoro District
- Rubanda District
- Rukiga District
- Rukungiri District

The six districts correspond to older county units widely referenced in Kigezi history: Bufumbira (Kisoro), Kinkizi (Kanungu), Ndorwa (Kabale), Rubanda, Rukiga, and Rujumbura (Rukungiri).

The sub-region was home to approximately 1.2 million inhabitants, according to the 2002 national census. The majority of the inhabitants of the sub-region belong to three major ethnic groups: (a) the Bakiga, the Bahororo and Banyarwanda. Other ethnicities include(d) the Batwa, the Bafumbira and others. The inhabitants of the sub-region also collectively refer to themselves as Abanyakigezi (singular Omunyakigezi).

== History ==
The present-day sub-region covers much of the former Kigezi District, a historic administrative unit in south-western Uganda.

Parliament created new districts from Kabale District as part of Uganda’s district-splitting process: Rubanda (effective 1 July 2016) and Rukiga (effective 1 July 2017).

== Geography and environment ==
Kigezi lies in Uganda’s south-west, near the borders with Rwanda and the Democratic Republic of the Congo. The landscape includes highlands, terraced hillsides, and rift-related features linked to the Albertine Rift system.

Key natural features and protected areas linked to the sub-region include: Bwindi Impenetrable National Park (gorilla habitat, UNESCO World Heritage Site). Mgahinga Gorilla National Park (Kisoro District, 33.7 km2). Lake Bunyonyi (Kabale and Rubanda districts, 61 km2).

== Demographics ==
The 2024 census recorded 1,787,231 people in Kigezi sub-region, up from 1,376,774 in the 2014 census.

== Economy ==
Agriculture supports many households, with Irish potato production prominent in parts of Kigezi, especially around Kabale and Kisoro.

Tea production also occurs in parts of the sub-region, with processing linked to the Kayonza area in Kanungu District.

Tourism is tied to gorilla trekking and protected-area visitation in Bwindi and Mgahinga.

== Education ==
Kabale City hosts Kabale University, a public university with roots in community-led founding and later transition to public status.

== Transport ==
Road corridors link Kabale to Lake Bunyonyi tourism areas and onward toward Kisoro and Mgahinga, supporting cross-district mobility and tourism access.

== See also ==
- Regions of Uganda
- Districts of Uganda
- Western Region, Uganda
- Kigezi District
