= Kabale District =

- District
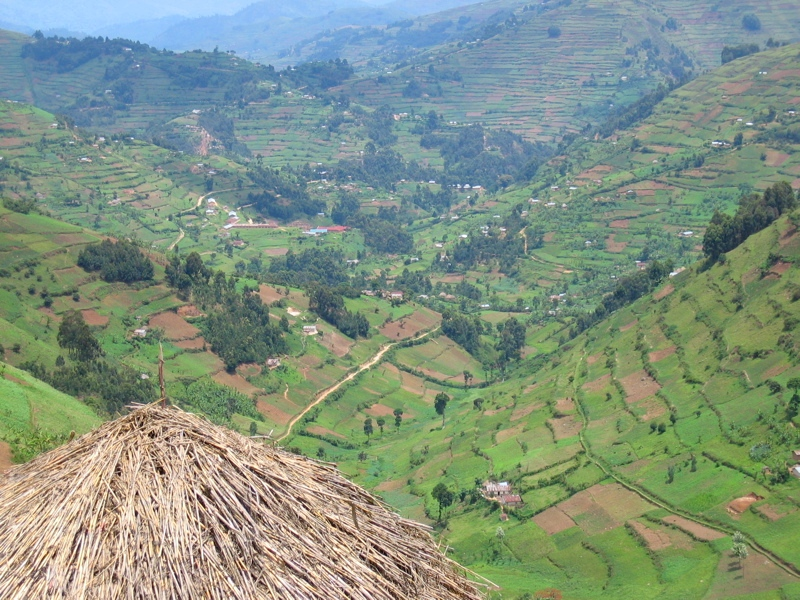
- Kabale's landscape

- District location in Uganda
- Coordinates: 01°15′S 30°0′E
- Country: Uganda
- Region: Western Region
- Sub-region: Kigezi sub-region
- Capital: Kabale

Area
  - Land: 620 km^{2} (240 sq mi)

Population (2020 Estimate)
  - Total: 248,700
  - Density: 401.2/km^{2} (1,039/sq mi)
- Time zone: UTC+3 (EAT)
- Website: www.kabale.go.ug

Kabale District is a district in the Western Region of Uganda. Kabale hosts the district headquarters. It was originally part of Kigezi District, before the districts of Rukungiri, Kanungu, Kisoro, Rubanda and Rukiga were excised to form separate districts. Kabale is sometimes nicknamed "Kastone" as in the local language Rukiga, a "kabale" is a small stone.

== Location ==
The Kabale District is bordered by Rukungiri District to the north, Rukiga District to the north-east, Rwanda to the east and south, Rubanda District to the west, and Kanungu District to the north-west. Kabale is approximately 143 kilometres (89 mi), by road, southwest of the city of Mbarara, the largest urban centre in Uganda's Western Region. Kabale is located approximately 410 kilometres (255 mi), by road, south-west of Kampala, the capital of Uganda. Kabale sits approximately 25 kilometres (16 mi), north of the town of Katuna at the international border with Rwanda.

== Population ==
The national population census and household survey of 27 August 2014, enumerated the population of the district at 230,609. The Uganda Bureau of Statistics (UBOS) estimated the district population, as constituted on 1 July 2020, at 248,700. Of these, 120,000 are estimated to be males and the remaining 128,700 are estimated to be females. UBOS calculated the average annual population growth rate at 1.3 percent, between 2014 and 2020.

== Notable people ==
- David Bahati, Ugandan MP infamous in the international community for authoring the 2009 Uganda Anti-Homosexuality Bill
- Amama Mbabazi, former Prime Minister
- Ruhakana Rugunda, Former Prime Minister of Uganda
- Matthew Rukikare, politician
- Ezra Suruma, economist
- Emmanuel Tumusiime-Mutebile, governor of Bank of Uganda
- Shem Bageine, Ugandan politician.
- George Kanyeihamba, Retired Judge
- Paul Ngologoza OBE, KSG, Author
- Anne Kansiime, comedienne, actress, and entertainer

== Economic activity ==
- Irish potatoes
- Bananas
- Peas
- Cabbage
- Maize
- Beans

== Livestock ==
- Cattle
- Chicken
- Goat
- Sheep

== See also ==
- Kigezi sub-region
- Western Region, Uganda
- Districts of Uganda
- Parliament of Uganda
