= Bwindi Impenetrable National Park =

National park in Uganda

- IUCN category II (national park)
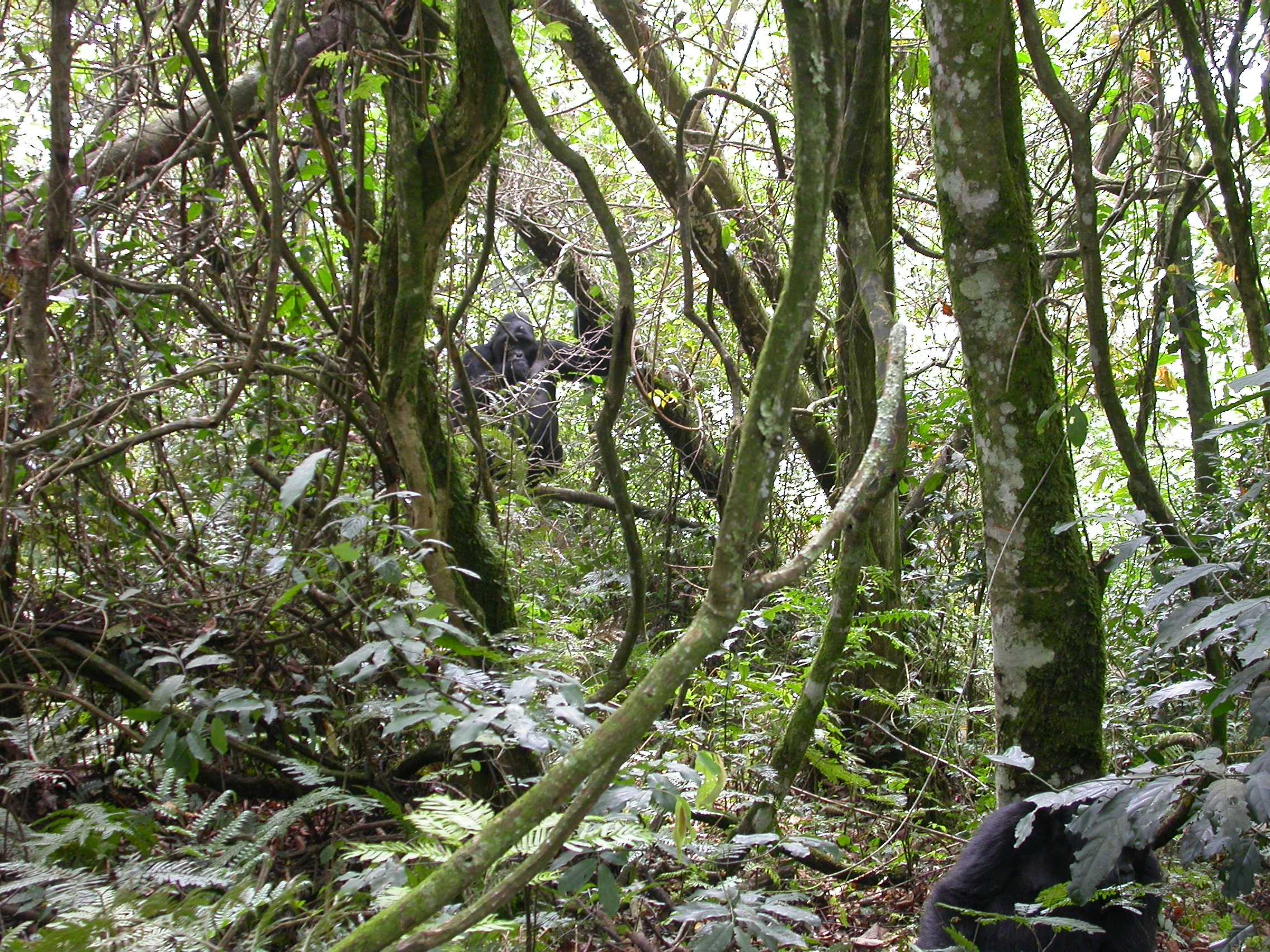
- Mountain gorillas in Bwindi Impenetrable Forest

- Location within Uganda
- Location: Kanungu District, Uganda
- Nearest city: Kanungu
- Coordinates: 01°01′S 29°41′E
- Area: 331 km^{2} (128 sq mi)
- Established: 1991
- Governing body: Uganda Wildlife Authority
- Website: https://nationalparks.ug/park?bwindi-impenetrable

UNESCO World Heritage Site
- Type: Natural
- Criteria: vii, x
- Designated: 1994 (18th session)
- Reference no.: 682
- Region: Africa

Bwindi Impenetrable National Park is a national park in southwestern Uganda. It is part of the Bwindi Impenetrable Forest and is situated along the Democratic Republic of the Congo border next to the Virunga National Park and on the edge of the Albertine Rift. Composed of 321 km^{2} (124 sq mi) of both lowland and montane forest, it is accessible only on foot. It is a United Nations Educational, Scientific and Cultural Organization-designated World Heritage Site.

Species diversity is a feature of the park. It provides habitat for 120 species of mammals, 350 species of birds, 310 species of butterflies, 27 species of frogs, chameleons, geckos, and many endangered species. Floristically, the park is among the most diverse forests in East Africa, with more than 1,000 flowering plant species, including 200 species of trees and 104 species of ferns. The northern (low elevation) sector has many species of Guineo-Congolian flora, including two endangered species, the brown mahogany and Brazzeia longipedicellata. In particular, the area shares in the high levels of endemisms of the Albertine Rift.

The park is a sanctuary for colobus monkeys, chimpanzees, and many birds such as hornbills and turacos. It is most notable for the 400 Bwindi gorillas, half of the world's population of the endangered mountain gorillas. Fourteen mountain gorilla groups live in four different sectors of Buhoma, Ruhijja, Rushaga and the Nkuringo in the districts of Kanungu, Kabale and Kisoro respectively, all under the management of Uganda Wildlife Authority.

== History ==
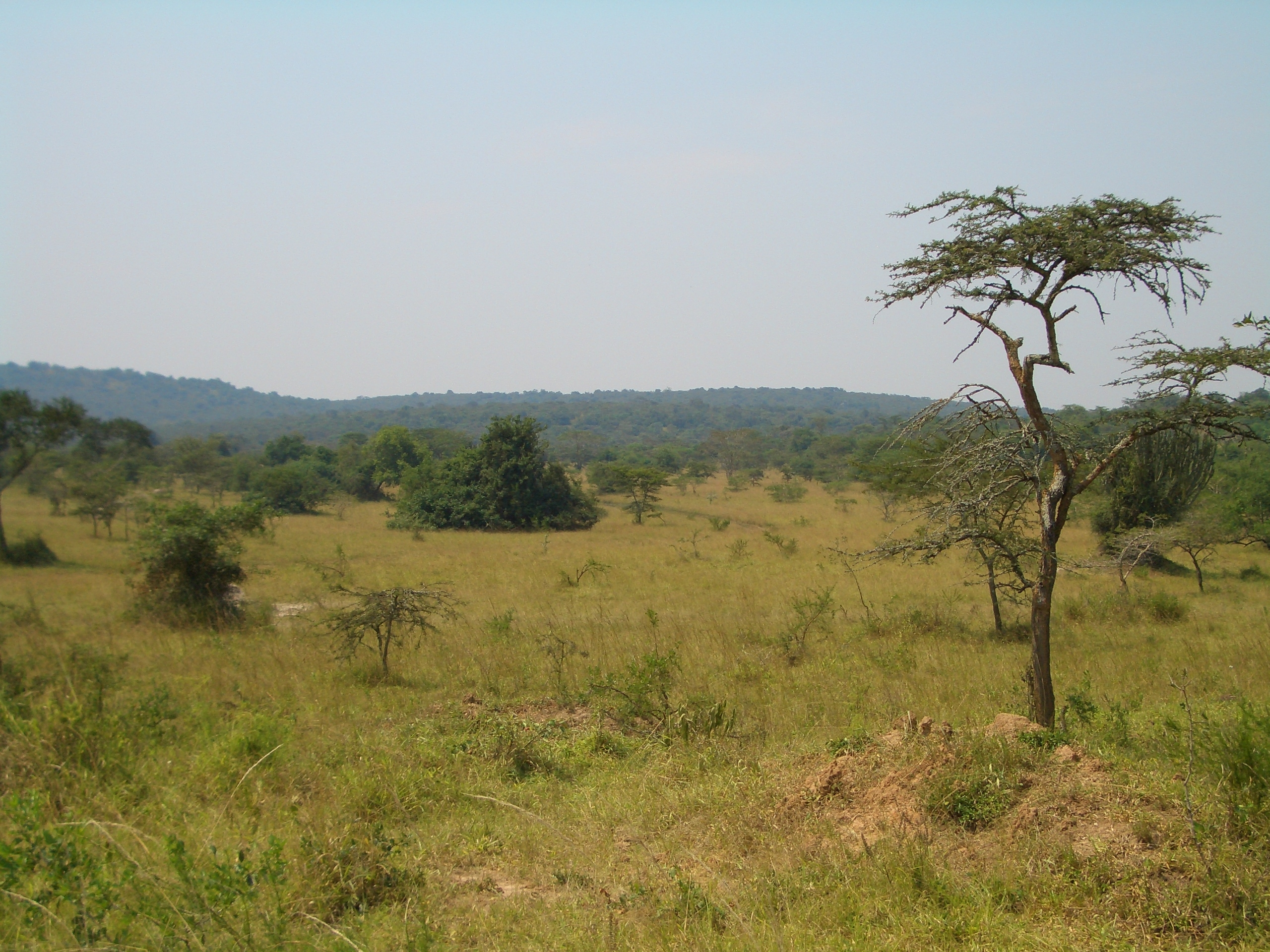
Bwindi Impenetrable National Park

Park boundaries

In 1932, two blocks of the Bwindi Impenetrable Forest were designated as Crown Forest Reserves. The northern block was designated as the "Kayonza Crown Forest Reserve", and the southern block designated as the "Kasatora Crown Forest Reserve". These reserves had a combined area of 207 square kilometres (80 sq mi). In 1942, the two reserves were combined and enlarged, then renamed the Impenetrable Central Crown Forest. This new protected area covered 298 square kilometres (115 sq mi) and was under the joint control of the Ugandan government's game and forest departments.

In 1964, the reserve was designated as an animal sanctuary to provide extra protection for its mountain gorillas and renamed the Impenetrable Central Forest Reserve. In 1966, two other forest reserves became part of the main reserve, increasing its area to almost 321 km^{2} (124 sq mi). The park continued to be managed as both a game sanctuary and forest reserve.

In 1991, the Impenetrable Central Forest Reserve, along with Mgahinga National Park and Rwenzori Mountains National Park, was designated as a national park and renamed Bwindi Impenetrable National Park. It covered an area of 330.8 square kilometres (127.7 sq mi). The national park was declared in part to protect a range of species within it, most notably the mountain gorilla. The reclassification of the park had a large impact on the Indigenous Batwa people, who were evicted from the forest and no longer permitted to enter the park or access its resources. Gorilla tracking became a tourist activity in April 1993, and the park became a popular tourist destination. In 1994, a 10 km^{2} (3.9 sq mi) area was incorporated into the park and it was inscribed on the World Heritage List. The park's management changed when Uganda National Parks, since renamed the Uganda Wildlife Authority, became responsible for the park. In 2003, a piece of land next to the park with an area of 4.2 km^{2} (1.6 sq mi) was purchased and incorporated into the park.

In March 1999, a force of 100–150 former Rwandan Interahamwe guerrillas infiltrated across the border from the DRC and kidnapped 14 foreign tourists and their Ugandan guide from the park headquarters, eventually releasing six and murdering the remaining eight with machetes and clubs. Several victims were reportedly tortured, and at least one of the female victims was raped. The Ugandan guide was doused with gasoline and lit on fire. The Interahamwe attack was reportedly intended to "destabilize Uganda" and frighten away tourist traffic from the park, depriving the Ugandan government of income. The park was forced to close for several months, and the popularity of the gorilla tours suffered badly for several years, though attendance has since recovered due to greater stability in the area. An armed guard also now accompanies every tour group.

== Geography and climate ==
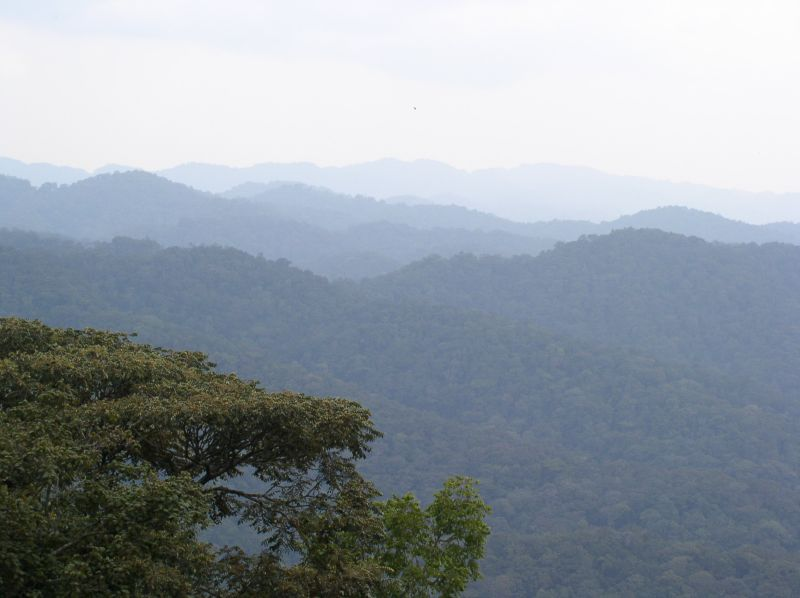
Mountains of Bwindi

Kabale town to the south-east is the nearest main town to the park, 29 km (18 mi) away by road. The park is composed of two blocks of forest that are connected by a corridor of forest. The shape of the park is a legacy of previous conservation management, when the original two forest blocks were protected in 1932. There is agricultural land where there were previously trees directly outside the park's borders. Cultivation in this area is intense.

The park's underlying geology consists of Precambrian shale phyllite, quartz, quartzite, schist, and granite. The park is at the edge of the Western Rift Valley in the highest parts of the Kigezi Highlands, which were created by up-warping of the Western Rift Valley. Its topography is very rugged, with narrow valleys intersected by rivers and steep hills. Elevations in the park range from 1,190 to 2,607 m (3,904 to 8,553 ft), and 60 percent of the park has an elevation of over 2,000 m (6,600 ft). The highest elevation is Rwamunyonyi Hill at the eastern edge of the park. The lowest part of the park is at its most northern tip.

The forest is an important water catchment area. With a generally impermeable underlying geology where water mostly flows through large fault structures, water infiltration and aquifers are limited. Much of the park's rainfall forms streams, and the forest has a dense network of streams. The forest is the source of many rivers that flow to the north, west, and south. Major rivers that rise in the park include the Ivi, Munyaga, Ihihizo, Ishasha, and Ntengyere rivers, which flow into Lake Edward. Other rivers flow into Lakes Mutanda and Bunyonyi. Bwindi supplies water to local agricultural areas.

Bwindi has a tropical climate. Annual mean temperature ranges from a minimum of 7 to 15 °C (45 to 59 °F) to a maximum of 20 to 27 °C (68 to 81 °F). Its annual rainfall ranges from 1,400 to 1,900 mm (55 to 75 in). Peak rainfall occurs from March to April and from September to November. The park's forest plays an important role in regulating the surrounding area's environment and climate. High amounts of evapotranspiration from the forest's vegetation increase the precipitation that the region outside the park receives. It also lessens soil erosion, a serious problem in south-western Uganda. It lessens flooding and ensures that streams continue to flow in the dry season.

== Biodiversity ==
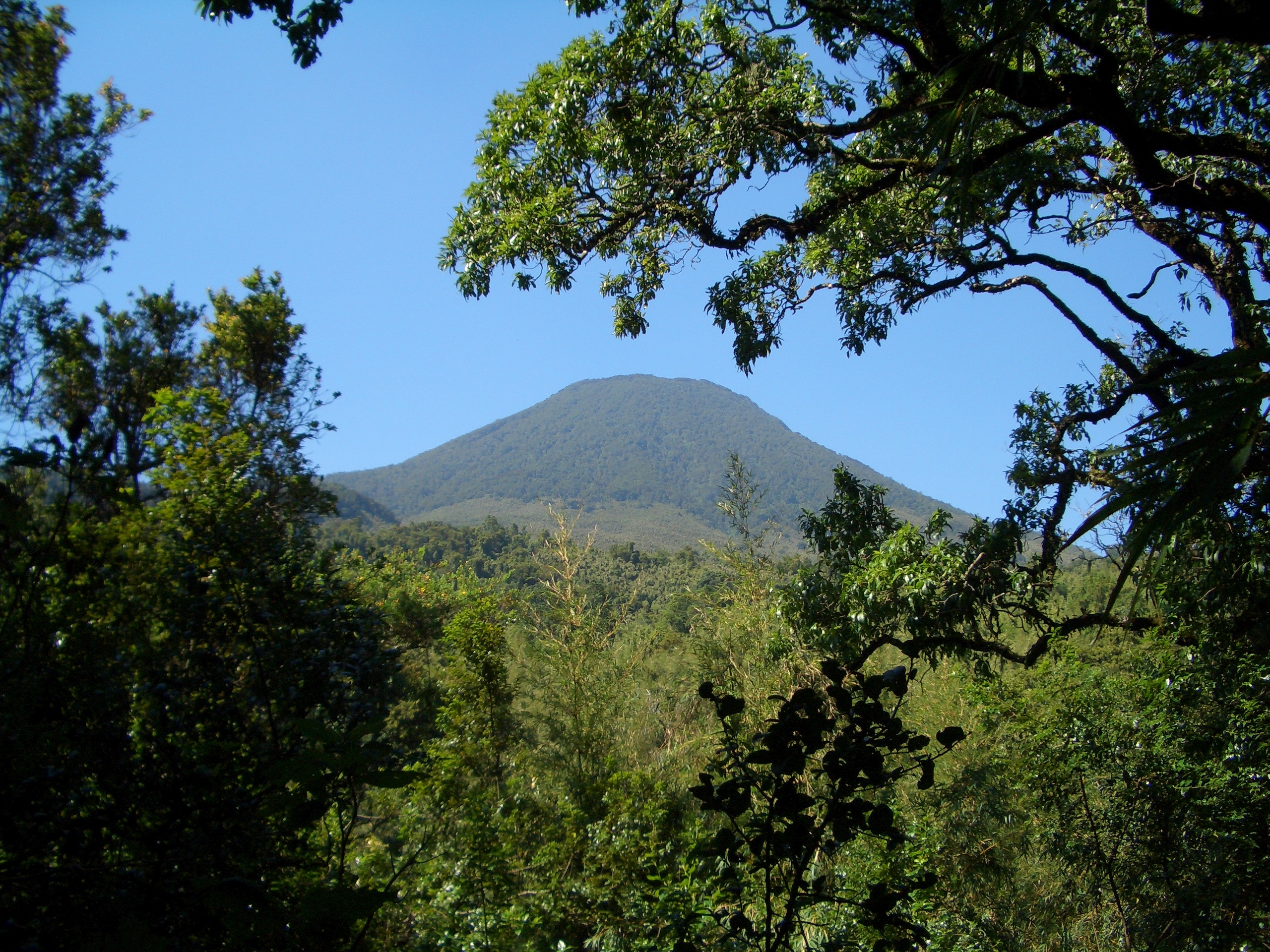
Bwindi Impenetrable Forest

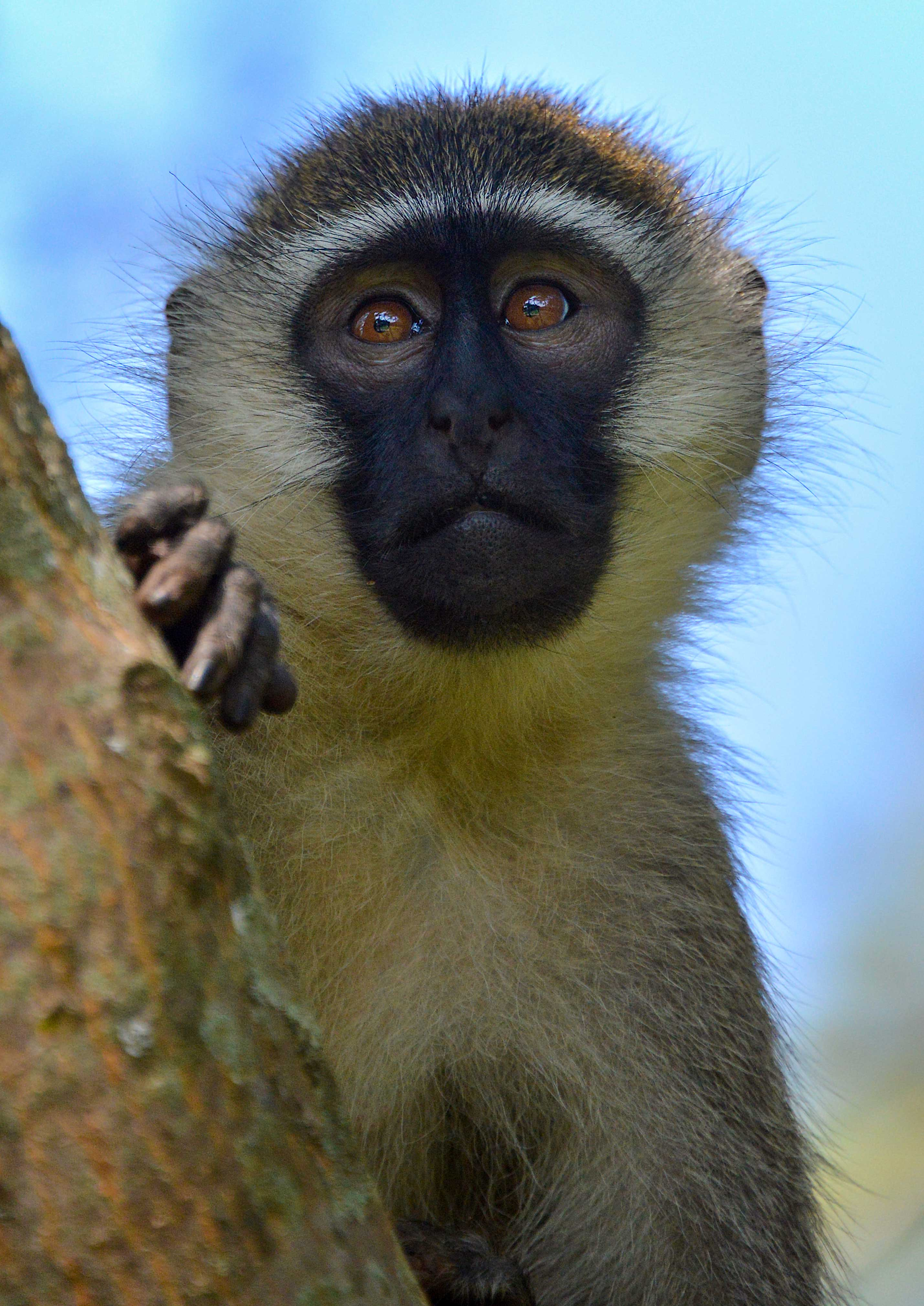
Vervet monkey in Uganda

The Bwindi Impenetrable Forest is old, complex, and biologically rich. Diverse species are a feature of the park, and it became a UNESCO World Heritage Site because of its ecological importance. Among East African forests, Bwindi has some of the richest populations of trees, small mammals, birds, reptiles, butterflies, and moths. The park's diverse species are partly a result of the large variations of elevation and habitat types in the park, and may also be because the forest was a refuge for species during glaciations in the Pleistocene epoch. The park's forests are afromontane, which is a rare vegetation type on the African continent. Located where plain and mountain forests meet, there is a continuum of low-altitude to high altitude primary forests in the park, one of the few large tracts of East African forest where this occurs. The park has more than 220 tree species, and more than 50% of Uganda's tree species, and more than 100 fern species. The brown mahogany is a threatened plant species in the park.

Bwindi Impenetrable National Park is important for the conservation of the afromontane fauna, especially species endemic to the Western Rift Valley's mountains. It is thought to have one of the richest faunal communities in East Africa, including more than 350 bird species and more than 200 butterfly species. There are an estimated 120 mammal species in the park, of which 10 are primates, and more than 45 are small mammals. Along with mountain gorilla, species in the park include common chimpanzee, L'Hoest's monkey, African elephant, African green broadbill, and cream-banded swallowtail, black and white colobus, red-tailed monkeys, vervets, the giant forest hog. The fish species in the park's rivers and streams are not well known.

The first-ever census of chimpanzees in the park was conducted in 2025, and found there to be 426 chimpanzees living in Bwindi.

=== Mountain gorillas ===
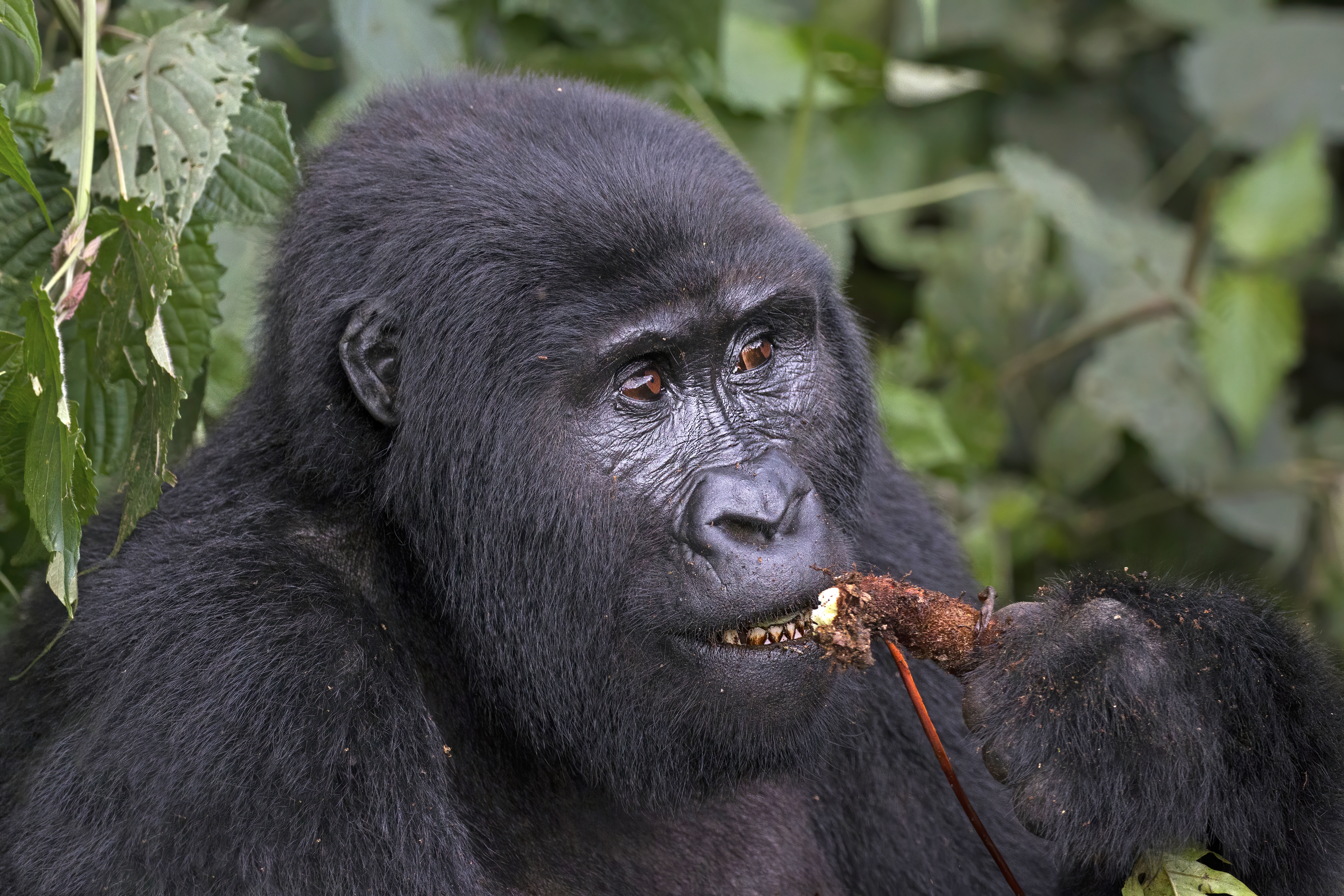
A mountain gorilla eating a root in the park

Bwindi Impenetrable National Park hosts a population of the mountain gorilla (Gorilla beringei beringei), known as the Bwindi population, which makes up almost half of all the mountain gorillas in the world. A 2006 census of the mountain gorilla population in the park showed that its numbers had increased modestly from an estimated 300 individuals in 1997, to 320 individuals in 2002 to 340 individuals in 2006. A census conducted in 2018 estimated that there were 36 social groups with a total of 459 mountain gorillas, as well as an additional 16 solitary individuals living in Bwindi. Poaching, disease and habitat loss are the greatest threat to the gorillas. The Bwindi mountain gorillas have been proposed by Craig Stanford as a separate, as yet unnamed subspecies of Gorilla beringei.

The mountain gorilla is an endangered species, with an estimated total population of about 650 individuals. There are no mountain gorillas in captivity, but during the 1960s and 1970s, some were captured to start captive breeding.

== Conservation ==
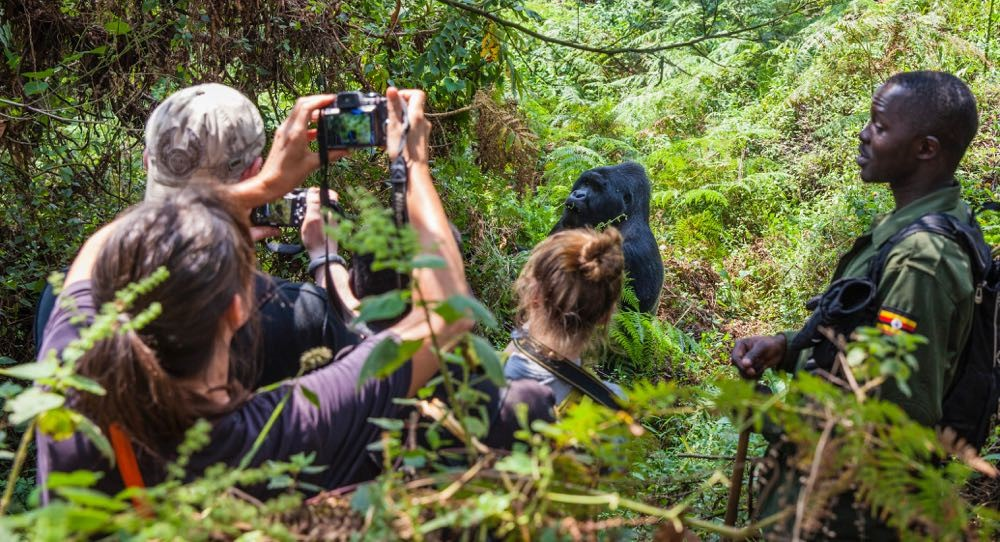
Armed park ranger with tourists seeing the gorillas

The park is owned by the Uganda Wildlife Authority, a parastatal government body. The park has total protection, although communities adjacent to the park can access some of its resources.

The areas bordering the park have a high population density of over 300/km^{2} (780/sq mi). Some of the people who live in these areas are among the poorest people in Uganda. The high population and poor agricultural practices place great pressure on the Bwindi forest, and are one of the biggest threats to the park. Ninety percent of the people are dependent on subsistence agriculture, as agriculture is one of the area's few ways of earning income.

Prior to Bwindi's gazetting as a national park in 1991, the park was designated as a forest reserve, and regulations about the right to access the forest were more liberal and seldom enforced. Local people hunted, mined, logged, pit sawed, and kept bees in the park. It was gazetted as a national park in 1991 because of its rich biodiversity and threats to the integrity of the forest. Its designation as a national park gave the park higher protection status. State agencies increased protection and control of the park. Adjacent communities' access to the forest immediately ended. This closing of access caused large amounts of resentment and conflict among these local communities and park authorities. The Batwa, an ethnic group that had relied on the forest, were badly affected. The Batwa fished, harvested wild yams and honey, and had ancestral sites within the park. Despite the Batwa people's historical claim to land rights and having lived in the area for generations without destroying the area's ecosystem, they did not benefit from any national compensation scheme when they were evicted. Non-Batwa farmers who had cut down the forested areas in order to cultivate them, received compensation and their land rights were recognised. People have lost livestock and crops from wildlife, and there have been some human deaths. The habituation of gorillas to humans in order to facilitate tourism may have increased the damage they do to local people's property because their fear of people has decreased.

== See also ==
- Institute of Tropical Forest Conservation – a forest research institute in the park
- Forests of Uganda
- Tropical rainforests ecoregions
