= Institute of Tropical Forest Conservation =

Ugandan research institute

The Institute of Tropical Forest Conservation (ITFC) is a post-graduate research institute based in the Bwindi Impenetrable Forest, in south-western Uganda. The institute is a semi-autonomous part of Mbarara University of Science and Technology and is focused on research, training, and monitoring for conservation management in the Albertine Rift ecoregion.

ITFC is located on the Eastern border of Bwindi Impenetrable National Park in Ruhija village, Rubanda district of South Western Uganda. The long history of ITFC's work in ecological and sociological research has established it as a leading post graduate research institution and field station. With over 200 publications about conservation in the region and a wealth of national, regional and international partners and donors - ITFC's work in conservation has influenced the direction of conservation the world over, and more specifically in the Albertine Rift ecoregion.

The Bwindi Impenetrable Forest is a tropical moist broadleaf forest in the Afromontane Albertine Rift montane forests ecoregion. It is primarily protected within the Bwindi Impenetrable National Park (BINP).

== History ==
ITFC dates back to 1983 with an ecological survey of the Bwindi forest by Thomas M. Butynski, funded by the New York Zoological Society which is now Wildlife Conservation society. The forest is part of the only homeland of endangered mountain gorillas, which are now endemic to the Virunga Mountains.

In 1986, the Impenetrable Forest Conservation Project (IFCP) began with support from the World Wildlife Fund. The project's mission was to protect the last remaining Afromontane forests of south-west Uganda: Bwindi, Mgahinga, and Echuya.

In 1991, the Bwindi Impenetrable Forest Reserve became the Bwindi Impenetrable National Park and the Mgahinga Forest Reserve became Mgahinga Gorilla National Park, a UNESCO World Heritage Site.

The IFPC became the ITFC - a semi autonomous academic unit of Mbarara University of Science and Technology in 1991, the same year in which Bwindi Impenetrable National Park was established. The Establishment of Bwindi Impenetrable and Mgahinga National Parks was after a successful recommendation by ITFC (then IFCP), Mbarara University of Science and Technology and other conservation partners after they expressed the danger that Bwindi and Mgahinga Forests faced if not quickly gazetted as National parks.

== Work ==
As part of their work, ITFC carries out ecological research and monitoring on the state on both plants and animals all around the Albertine Rift ecoregion. This takes place in such places as Mount Rwenzori National Park, Queen Elizabeth National Park, Semuliki National Park, Mount Elgon National Park, Mgahinga Gorilla National Park, Bwindi Impenetrable National Park and the Greater Virunga Landscape. Activities such as vegetation monitoring, animal monitoring, Gorilla population census, community involvement in conservation, promotion of sustainable tourism practice among so many others are the regular activities at ITFC.
