= Nigerian lowland forests =

Ecoregion in Nigeria and Benin

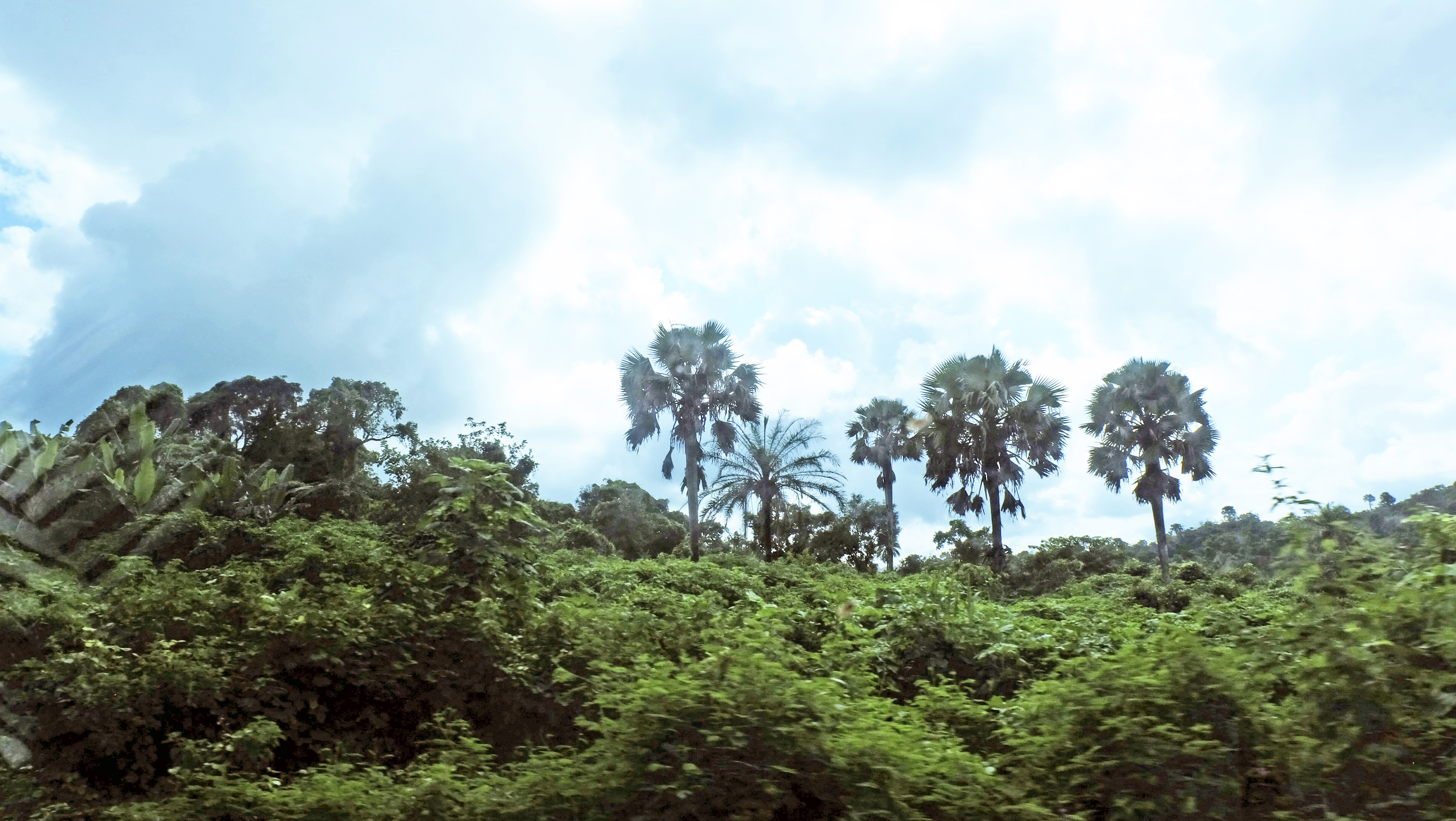
- Forest near Benin City

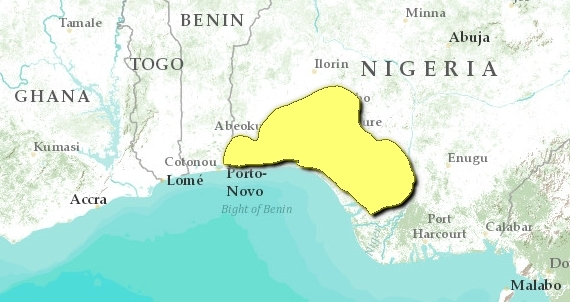
- Map of the Nigerian lowland forests

Ecology
- Realm: Afrotropical
- Biome: Tropical and subtropical moist broadleaf forests
- Borders: Central African mangroves; Cross-Niger transition forests; Guinean forest-savanna mosaic; Niger Delta swamp forests

Geography
- Area: 67,340 km^{2} (26,000 mi^{2})
- Countries: Nigeria; Benin
- Coordinates: 6.8°N 5.0°E

Conservation
- Conservation status: critical/endangered

The Nigerian lowland forests, also known as the Nigerian rainforest, are tropical moist forest ecoregion in southwestern Nigeria and southeastern Benin. The ecoregion is densely populated and home to several large cities, including Lagos, Ibadan, and Benin City. They are considered one of the most biodiverse habitats in the country and are home to a wide range of plant and animal species. There is still significant tree cover, but the remaining enclaves of forest are increasingly fragmented. Though many areas are now used for timber, which provides business for timber traders. The ecoregion is wetter along the coast and drier inland, resulting in bands of vegetation zones that run parallel to the coast for the 400 km length of the region. With the establishment of a Department of Woods and Forests for the Colony and Protectorate of Lagos in 1897 to control timber extraction that had started as early as the 1880s, Nigeria saw the beginning of the first kind of forest management To better control the use of forest resources, the British colonial authority established forest reserves.

Through the implementation of forestry ordinances,16 local communities were granted the freedom to hunt, fish, gather, tap rubber, and farm within designated areas. The majority of the country's forests were reserved before 1930, though some were added in the Niger Delta and the savanna region as late as the 1960s and 1970s. As a result, Nigeria now has 96,000 km^{2} (37,000 sq mi) of designated forest reserves, with 20,700 km^{2} (8,000 sq mi) of those reserves being in the forest ecological zone, and the remaining 82 reserves being in the country's lowland forests, which make up 10,504 km^{2} (4,056 sq mi) or about 15% of the total area. Large sections of forest continued to fall beyond the forest reserves even during this time. Prior to 1960, working plans were used to manage forest reserves, and colonial officials made sure that these plans were strictly followed. The amount of timber being extracted, however, increased by 1960, and once the 1970s saw the start of oil windfall earnings, domestic demand for timber goods skyrocketed. In an effort to boost foreign cash and support local businesspeople, economic trees like mahoganies and iroko (Milicia excelsa), which were formerly controlled by foreigners and expatriates, were selectively logged in huge quantities under laxer forestry rules. These are great economic trees that aid the people in development and building of houses.

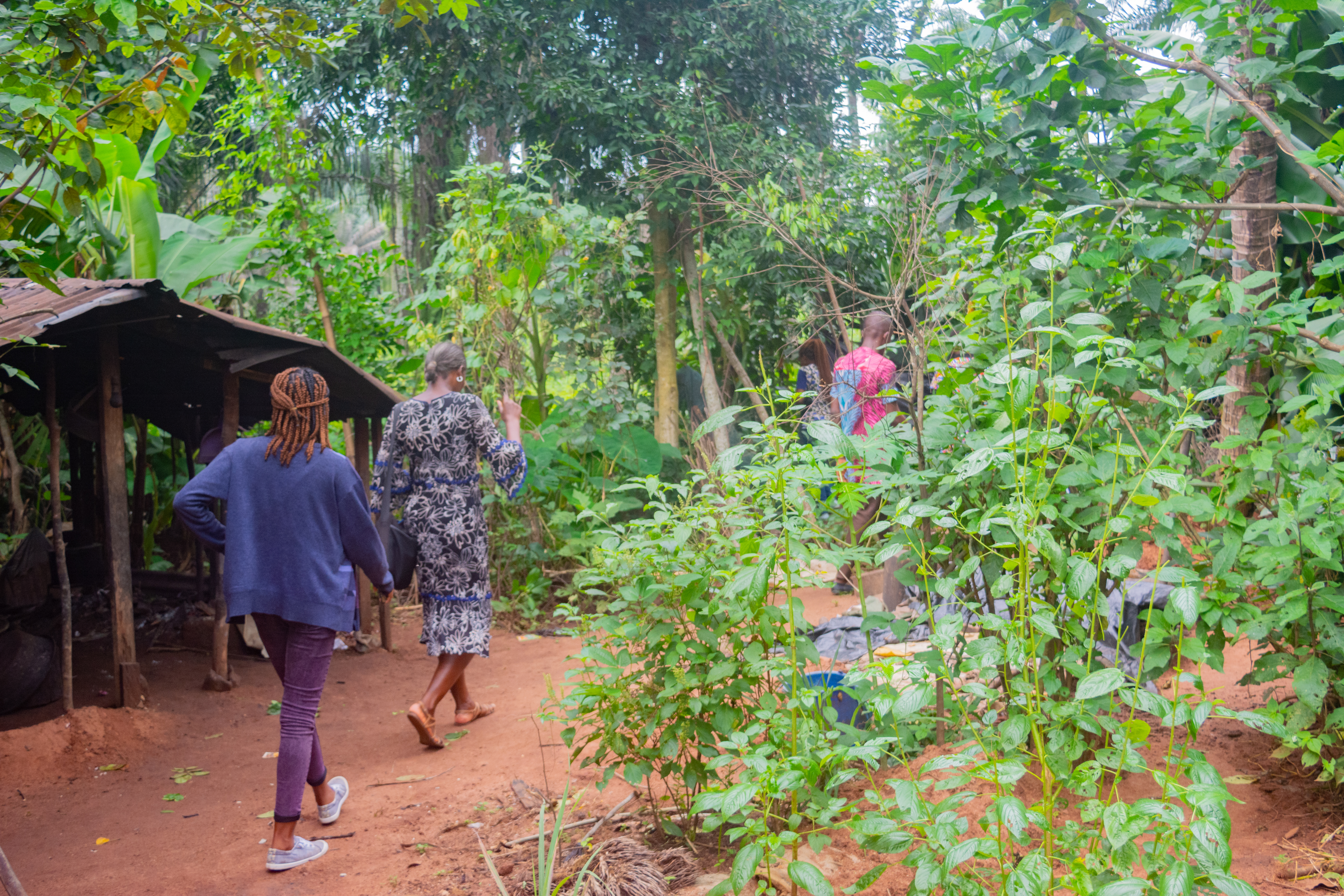
Students with Forest Department

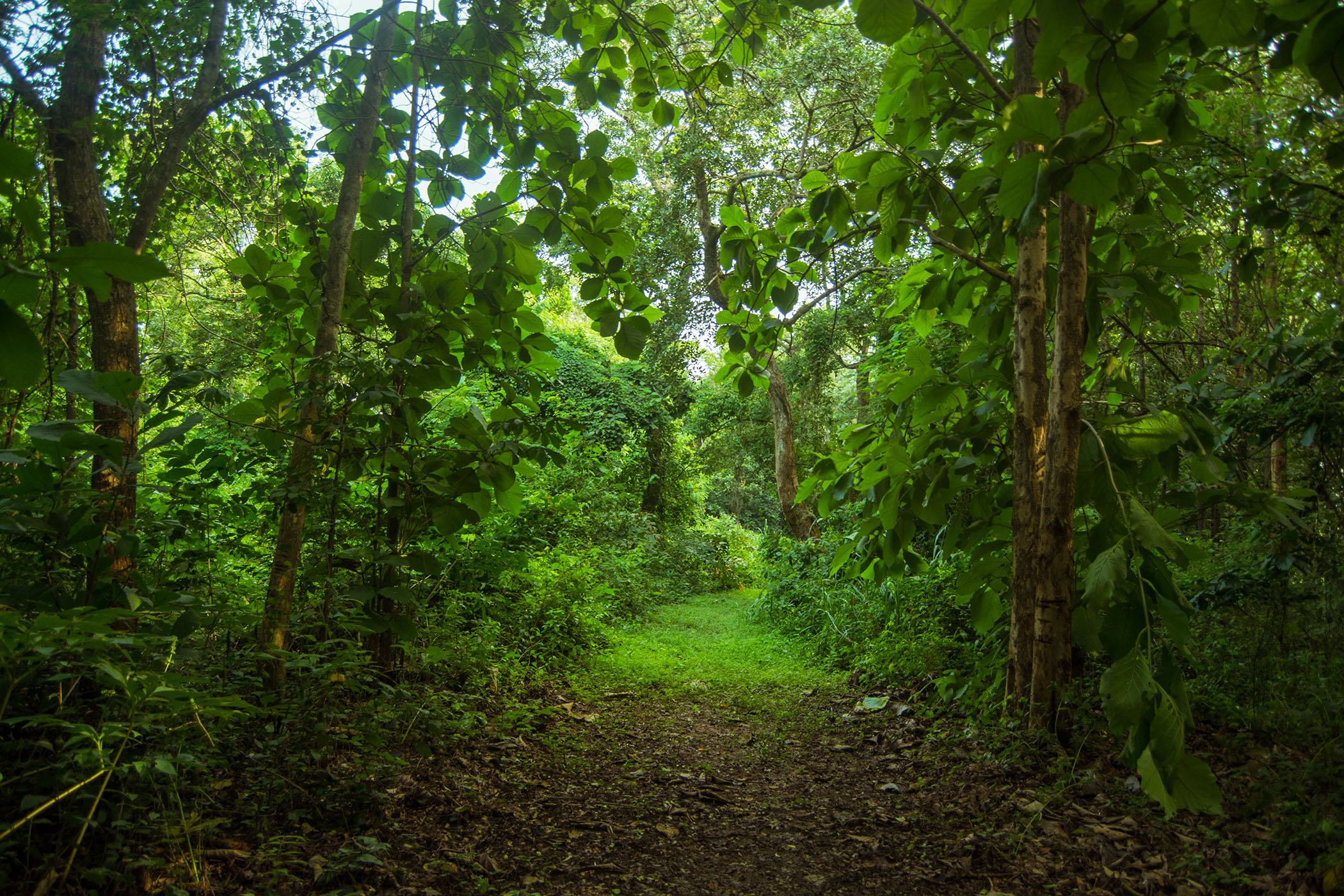
Abeokuta forest nursery for silviculture

To ensure a steady supply of hardwood, the Nigerian forestry departments, like other African forestry authorities, attempted to take up the challenge of silviculture in moist forests beginning in the 1950s. However, the fact that tropical forests are exhaustible after continuous extractive activities was realized very early in the exploitation history. This may have evolved from the original 1906 timber regulations that required loggers to establish plantations or release patches of spontaneous regeneration. Some of the techniques utilized artificial regeneration, but others depended on natural regeneration. The Malayan experience served as the basis for the 1940s adoption of the Nigerian tropical shelter wood system. It involves climbers cutting and opening up the canopy by killing trees thought to be less valuable, allowing valuable tree species to regenerate naturally.

== Geography ==
The Nigerian lowland forests are bounded on the south by coastal mangroves and the Gulf of Guinea, on the east by the Niger River and its delta, on the north by the Guinean forest-savanna mosaic. On the west it is bounded by the Dahomey Gap, a drier coastal region where the forest-savanna mosaic extends all the way to the ocean, separating the Lower Guinean forests, of which the Nigerian lowland forests are part, from the Upper Guinean forests of West Africa. It contains over 560 indigenous species and supports the timber, which is used for building.

== Climate ==
The climate of the ecoregion is Tropical savanna climate - dry winter (Köppen climate classification (Aw)). This climate is characterized by relatively even temperatures throughout the year, and a pronounced dry season. The driest month has less than 60 mm (2.4 in) of precipitation, and is drier than the average month. Climate change affect the survival of some trees. Under a harsh sun and extreme dry weather, some plants will start dying off. The authors maintained that Nigeria is experiencing different change in climate that affects her vegetation. There has been changes on how rain falls, sometimes harsh sun and cold, which reduces the growth of plants in the country. High rainfall also affect the survival of our forest. Flooding, which have occurred in many parts of Nigeria.

== Flora and fauna ==
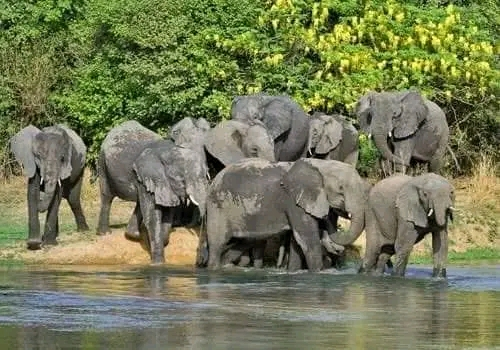
Flora and fauna in Nigeria

Nigerian lowland forests are recognized as one of the biodiversity hotspots in Africa. They support a remarkable diversity of flora and fauna. The region is home to numerous endemic plant species, including rare and endangered ones. The forests provide habitat for a rich variety of animals, such as primates (including the Nigeria-Cameroon chimpanzee), elephants, leopards, antelopes, reptiles, amphibians, and a vast array of bird species.

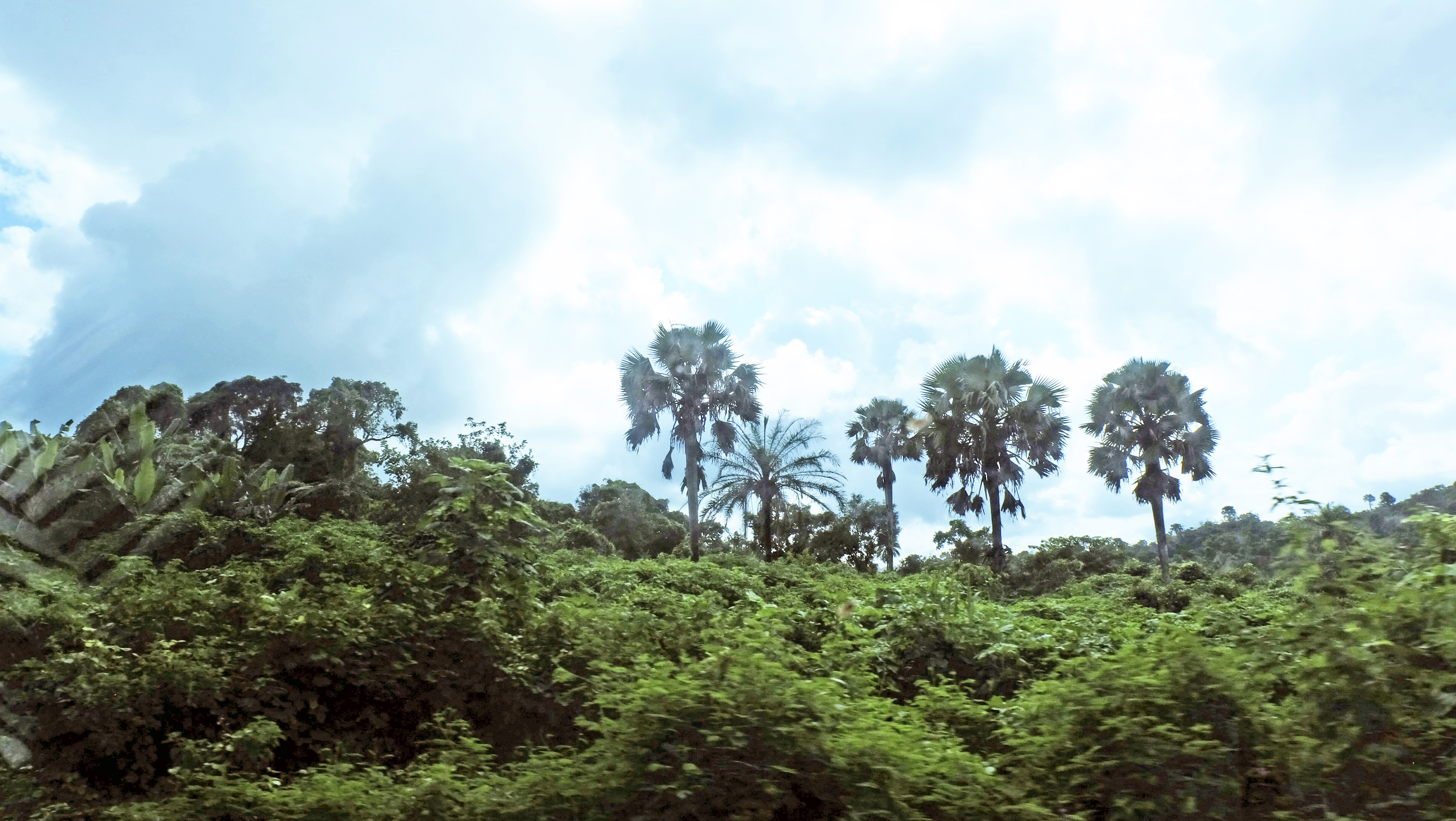
a broad leaf evergreen forest in Benin Nigeria

About 48% of the territory is closed forest, mostly broadleaf evergreen trees. Another 36% is open forest, 5% is urban and built up, and the remainder is wetland and herbaceous cover. Because rainfall declines with distance from the sea, the ecoregion exhibits climate bands with vegetation zones that parallel the coast. Closest to the sea is the rain forest zone, followed by the mixed deciduous forest zone and farthest inland tis he parkland zone. In the rainforest zone, the common trees are of the Leguminosae family (Brachystegia), Cylicodiscus gabunensis, Gossweilerodendron balsamiferum, Piptadeniastrum africanum, and the Meliaceae family (Entandrophragma, Guarea, Khaya ivorensis, and Lovoa trichilioides.

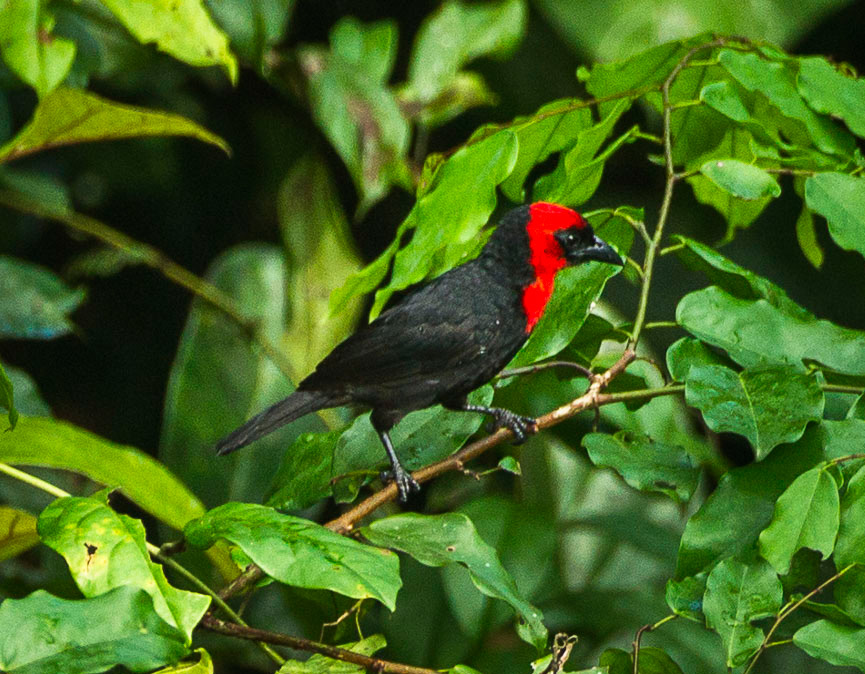
An image of a species of the malimbe

While in general, the levels of animal endemism are low in the ecoregion, there are some notable endemic species. The endangered white-throated guenon (Cercopithecus erythrogaster) is only found in this ecoregion. The endangered Ibadan malimbe (Malimbus ibadanensis) is found in the northern parkland zone. A recent survey of the Niger Delta recorded the endangered crested genet (Genetta cristata). The Nigeria crag gecko (Cnemaspis petrodroma) and the Perrots' toad (Bufo perreti) have also been recorded in the region.

== Services provided by these forests ==
Nigerian lowland forests are not just lush, verdant landscapes teeming with biodiversity; they are also ecosystems that offer a wide range of services crucial for the environment and human well-being. there are various services provided by these forests, including economic, regulatory, provisioning, educational, and protective services.

=== Economic Service ===
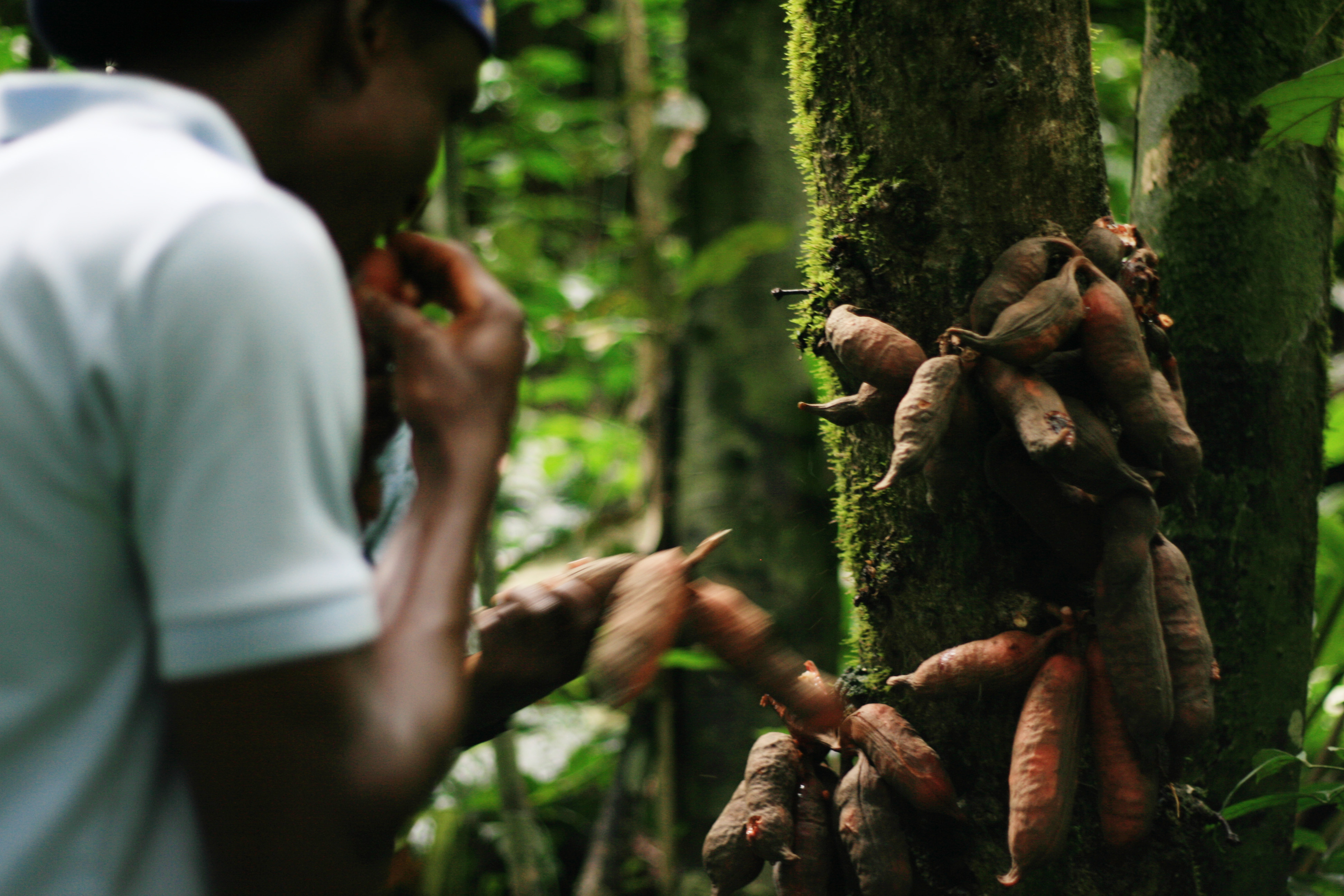
Forest resources

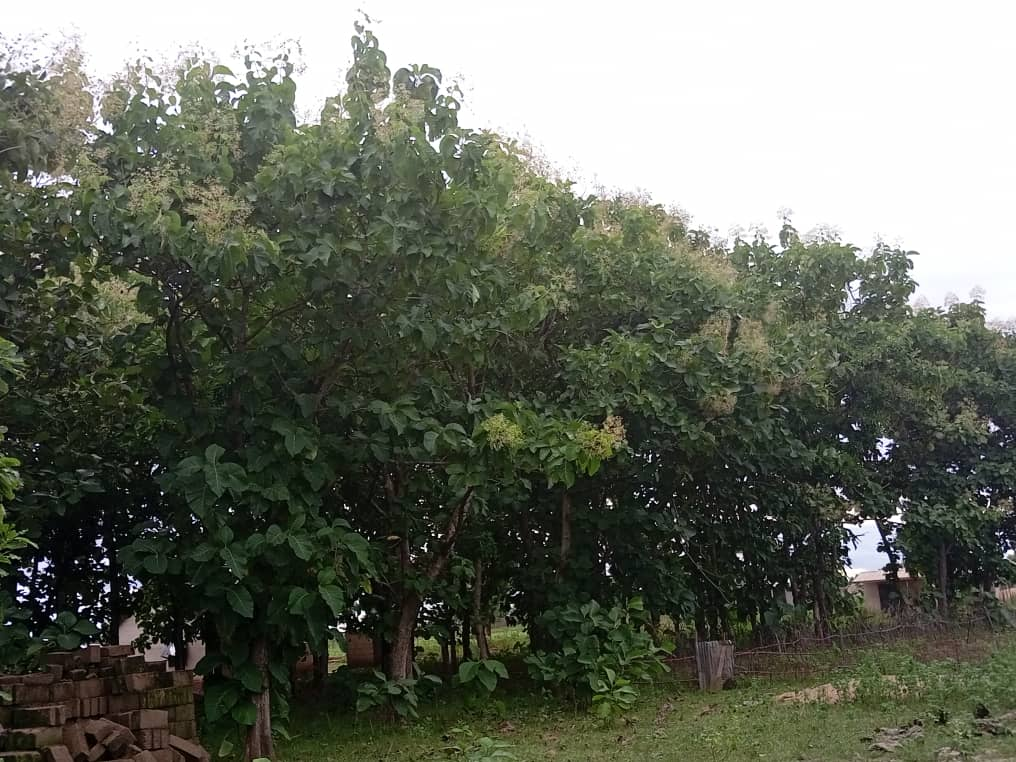
African Teak Trees for High-Quality Timber in Furniture Production

Nigerian lowland forests offer a significant economic service to local communities and the nation as a whole. This service includes:

- Timber and Non-Timber Forest Products: The forests are a vital source of timber for construction and furniture making. Additionally, they provide a wide array of non-timber forest products such as medicinal plants, spices, and fruit, which are often harvested and sold, contributing to local economies. Some notable timber species found in these forests include:
1. Mahogany (Khaya spp.): Mahogany is a highly sought-after tropical hardwood known for its beautiful reddish-brown wood. It is used extensively in furniture making, cabinetry, and interior finishing in construction.
2. Iroko (Milicia excelsa): Iroko is another valuable hardwood used for various construction purposes, particularly in outdoor applications due to its resistance to decay and termites.
3. African Teak (Tectona grandis): African Teak, like its Asian counterpart, is prized for its natural resistance to insects and rot. It is predominant in the lowland rainforest zone of southwestern Nigeria It is used in boat building, furniture, and flooring.
4. Obeche (Triplochiton scleroxylon): Obeche is a softwood that is used in construction, and joinery, as a preferred choice for the production of plywood. It is found in abundance in the lowland forest zones of Africa including Nigeria.
5. African Walnut (Lovoa trichilioides): This hardwood is prized for its use in furniture making and cabinetry and is also available in Nigerian lowland forests.

The Non-timber forest products from Nigerian lowland forests include:

1. Medicinal Plants: The forests are rich in medicinal plants with cultural and economic value. Many indigenous communities rely on these plants for traditional medicine, they are found in states such as Cross river and Edo which are all part of the lowland rainforest zone.
2. Spices: The forests are a source of various spices, including pepper, cloves, and nutmeg, which are used for culinary and medicinal purposes.
3. Fruits: The forests yield a variety of fruits like bush mango, bush pear, and wild figs. These fruits are harvested and consumed locally, while surplus production can be sold in markets.
4. Bushmeat: The wild game is an essential source of protein for many local communities, and hunting is common in the lowland forest regions.
- Eco-Tourism: These lush forests attract nature enthusiasts, scientists, and tourists, thereby creating opportunities for eco-tourism. This industry boosts local economies by providing jobs and income through activities like guided tours and accommodation services. Some of the unique eco-tourism sites in Nigerian lowland forests, offers distinctive features which draw visitors, including foreigners, to partake in the splendors of nature. They include:
1. Cross River National Park: Located in the Cross River State, this park is one of Nigeria's most renowned eco-tourism destinations. It is home to diverse wildlife, including the critically endangered Cross River gorilla. Tourists are drawn to its lush rainforests, breathtaking waterfalls, and the opportunity to witness the rich biodiversity of the region. Foreign tourists, particularly from Europe and North America, are frequent visitors.
2. Omo Forest Reserve: Situated in the southwestern part of the country, Omo Forest Reserve boasts a mosaic of habitats, including primary rainforests and freshwater swamps. Its tranquil setting and biodiversity attract birdwatchers, botanists, and nature lovers. Tourists from Europe, particularly the United Kingdom and Germany, are common visitors.
3. Okomu National Park: Located in Edo State, Okomu National Park offers visitors a chance to explore pristine rainforests and observe a variety of wildlife, including forest elephants, monkeys, and numerous bird species.- It is an attractive destination for ecotourists and researchers, with foreign tourists arriving from Europe and North America.
4. Edumanom Forest Reserve: This forest reserve in Cross River State is celebrated for its striking landscapes, clear streams, and the opportunity to explore unique flora and fauna. It is a favorite among hikers and nature photographers. Tourists from countries such as the United States and Canada are frequent visitors.
- Carbon Credits and Offsets: Nigerian lowland forests help sequester carbon dioxide, making them an essential asset in the fight against climate change. They can be utilized to generate carbon credits and offsets, which can be traded on international carbon markets, offering economic benefits to the nation. Owners can emit a fixed quantity of greenhouse gases with the use of carbon offsets, also known as carbon credits. They are a part of a cap-and-trade scheme in which corporations that pollute get credits to keep doing so up to a predetermined, regularly lowered limit. Private businesses are encouraged to cut emissions by selling extra allowances and investing in more credits. There are two ways to account for the greenhouse gases causing climate change: carbon offsets and carbon credits. Carbon offsets measure the amount of greenhouse gas removal from the environment, such as planting trees to absorb ozone and carbon dioxide. The right to emit one ton of carbon dioxide is represented by carbon credits, which are tradable instruments that are assigned to emitting sources or that are sold at auction. Both seek to reduce greenhouse gas emissions in an effort to slow down global warming. To lessen their carbon footprints, businesses can trade carbon credits.

=== Regulation Service ===
These forests play a vital role in regulating environmental processes and maintaining ecological balance:

- Climate Regulation: The forests help regulate local and regional climates by absorbing and releasing moisture, stabilizing temperatures, and sequestering carbon dioxide. This, in turn, helps mitigate the effects of climate change.
- Water Quality and Flow Regulation: They act as natural filters, improving water quality by trapping sediments and impurities. Also, they regulate water flow, reducing the risk of flooding during heavy rainfall and ensuring a stable supply of water during dry periods.

The regulation service from these forests cannot be overemphasized as their distinctive characteristics enables their functionality in this role: One of the standout features of Cross River National Park is the vast canopy of its rainforests which aids its role in regulating local and regional climates. Lush forests act as enormous sponges, absorbing and releasing moisture, which, in turn, has a cooling effect on the environment. Also, the dense vegetation helps stabilize temperatures and prevent extreme fluctuations while the Omo Forest Reserve as a freshwater swamp and primary rainforest has the capacity to contributes to local climate stability by maintaining consistent humidity levels. It also plays a vital role in water retention and release, reducing the risk of both droughts and floods. Also the rainforests help sequester carbon dioxide, one of the primary greenhouse gases contributing to climate change. The park's forests, through their extensive tree cover, play a crucial role in reducing atmospheric CO_{2} levels and consequently aid in mitigating the impacts of climate change.

=== Provision Service ===
These forests offer essential resources for human survival and well-being:

- Provision of Food: They provide a source of food through the collection of fruits, nuts, and edible plants, particularly for local communities living in or near the forest. Some specific forest products include:
1. Bush Mango: These forests yield the highly sought-after bush mango (Irvingia spp.), whose fruit is used in various dishes and for its culinary oil. Bush mango is rich in nutrients and has both cultural and economic significance.
2. Bush Pear: The lowland forests offer delicious and nutritious bush pear (Dacryodes edulis), often consumed as a fruit, also it is a vital source of nutrition and is traded locally.
3. Wild Figs: Nigerian lowland forests also provide a variety of wild fig species, which are a valuable source of vitamins and dietary fiber.
- Fuel: Firewood and charcoal are essential sources of fuel in Nigeria, particularly in rural areas where access to alternative energy sources is limited. The forests supply an abundance of firewood and wood for charcoal production, supporting daily cooking and heating needs.
- Special Materials: Nigerian lowland forests offer various special materials that are used for both practical and traditional purposes, contributing to local livelihoods and cultural practices:
1. Rattan and Cane: These flexible materials are used for crafting furniture, baskets, and other woven products, providing a sustainable source of income for local artisans.
2. Medicinal Plants: Nigerian lowland forests are repositories of medicinal plants used in traditional and modern medicine. Many indigenous communities rely on these forests for natural remedies.
3. Bamboo: Bamboo is a versatile material used for making furniture, crafts, and construction in local communities.

=== Educational Service ===
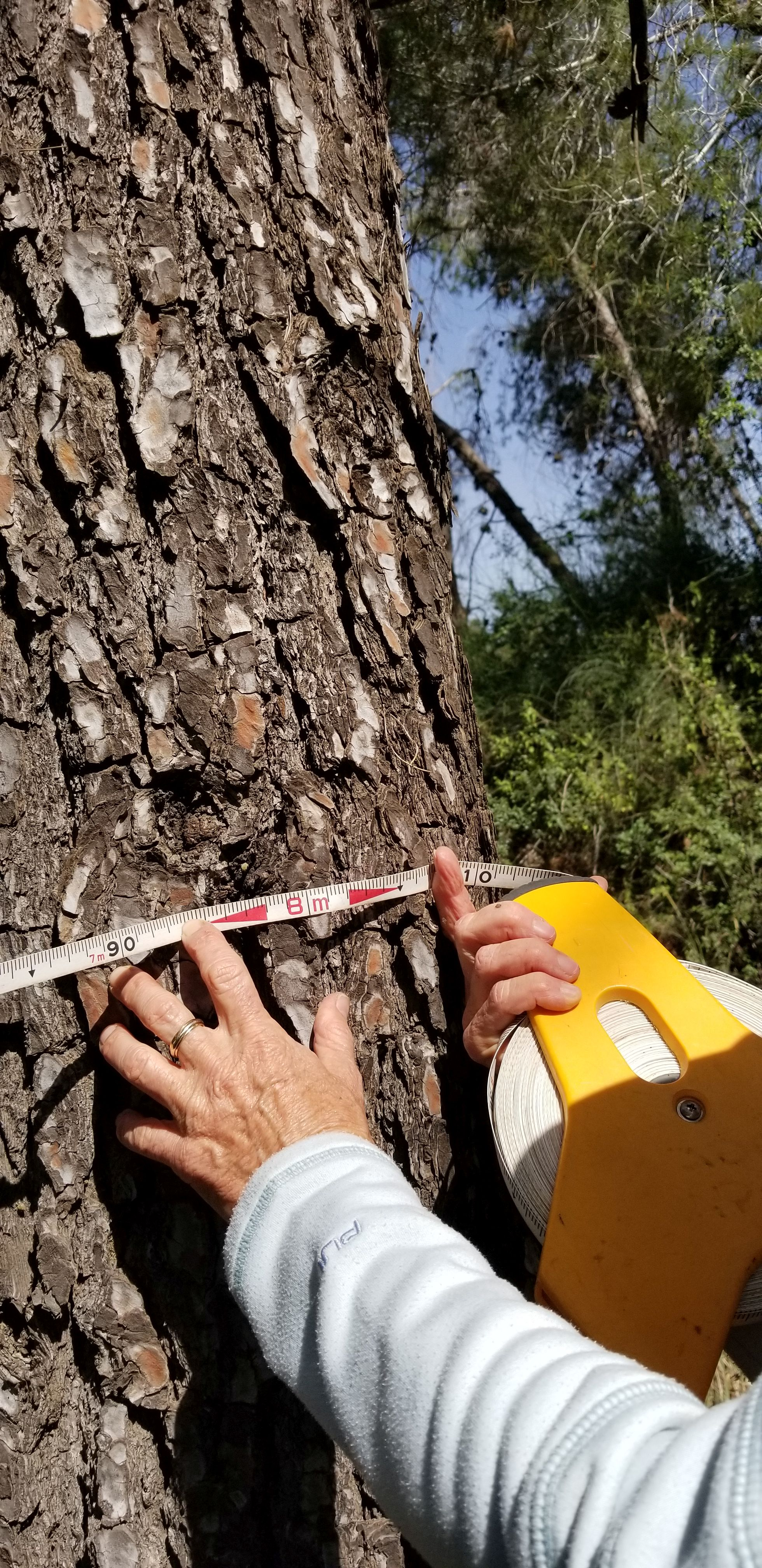
Forest research activities

Nigerian lowland forests are outdoor classrooms for both formal and informal education:

- Scientific Research: These forests are essential for scientific research and environmental studies. They serve as living laboratories where researchers can study various ecological processes, leading to a better understanding of the natural world.
- Biodiversity Conservation Education: They provide a rich educational resource for teaching and raising awareness about biodiversity, ecology, and conservation. Educational institutions often conduct field trips to teach students about ecosystems and environmental stewardship.

=== Protection Service ===
Nigerian lowland forests offer protection services that safeguard both the environment and human populations:

- Natural Disaster Mitigation: The forests act as a barrier against natural disasters such as landslides, soil erosion, and flash floods. Their dense vegetation and root systems stabilize the soil and reduce the risk of calamities in hilly and mountainous regions.
- Habitat for Wildlife: These forests provide a habitat for a wide variety of plant and animal species. By protecting these ecosystems, they, in turn, protect the wildlife and biodiversity within them.
  1. Forest Elephant Sanctuary: The Okomu National Park, for instance, protects an essential population of forest elephants. These forests offer a sanctuary for these magnificent creatures, allowing them to thrive and contributing to their conservation.
  2. Endangered Primates: Cross River National Park is a refuge for critically endangered primates, including the Cross River gorilla. The forests play a critical role in safeguarding these rare species from poaching and habitat destruction.

== Threats and conservation challenges ==
Nigerian lowland forests face several threats and conservation challenges. Deforestation, mainly driven by agricultural expansion, logging, and urbanization, poses a significant risk to the integrity of these forests. The conversion of forested areas to farmland and the extraction of timber have resulted in habitat fragmentation, loss of biodiversity, and increased vulnerability to invasive species. Additionally, illegal logging and unsustainable hunting practices further exacerbate the conservation challenges.

Nigerian lowland forests, no doubt, face several threats and conservation challenges that jeopardize their integrity and biodiversity. A more elaborate discussion of these threats and challenges follows:

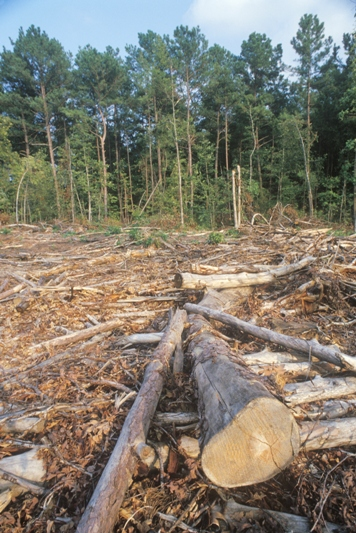
Deforestation in Nigeria

Deforestation and habitat loss: Deforestation is a major threat to Nigerian lowland forests. The expansion of agriculture, particularly for the cultivation of cash crops like oil palm, cocoa, and rubber, has led to extensive clearing of forested areas. Logging for timber extraction, both legal and illegal, also contributes to habitat loss and degradation. As a result, the forests are fragmented, reducing the availability of continuous habitats for wildlife and disrupting ecological processes.

Unsustainable logging and illegal activities: Unsustainable logging practices pose a significant threat to the Nigerian lowland forests. Illegal logging, in particular, is rampant and exacerbates the problem. The unregulated extraction of timber leads to the loss of valuable tree species, alters forest structure, and disrupts ecosystem dynamics. Additionally, illegal activities such as poaching, wildlife trafficking, and collection of rare plant species further endanger the biodiversity of the forests.

Agricultural expansion and land conversion: The conversion of forested areas to agricultural land is a significant driver of deforestation in Nigerian lowland forests. The growing demand for food and cash crops, coupled with population growth, has resulted in the clearing of forests for large-scale farming operations. This land conversion not only reduces forest cover but also leads to soil erosion, loss of soil fertility, and increased vulnerability to invasive species.

Infrastructure development and urbanization: Infrastructure development, including road construction, dams, and urban expansion, poses a threat to the Nigerian lowland forests. These activities often require land clearance and result in habitat fragmentation. Infrastructure development also facilitates access to previously remote areas, leading to increased deforestation and exploitation of forest resources.

Climate change and fragmentation: Climate change impacts, such as increased temperatures and altered rainfall patterns, can have adverse effects on the Nigerian lowland forests. Changes in climatic conditions may disrupt the ecological balance and affect the distribution and abundance of plant and animal species. Fragmentation of the forests exacerbates these impacts by limiting species' ability to migrate and adapt to changing environmental conditions.

Poverty: Nigeria is experiencing a high level of poverty, and this has led many to deforestation. People are going into the bush with the intention of fetching firewood, cutting down trees for timber, and for so many other reasons. The level of poverty ravaging the majority of the masses is tripling on a daily basis.

Illiteracy: owing to lack of environmental understanding, dependency on forest resources owing to poverty, exclusion from conservation efforts, susceptibility to criminal activity, and adherence to unsustainable traditions, illiteracy can result in the deterioration, destruction, and exploitation of forests. Promoting literacy, giving people other livelihood options, including communities in conservation, assuring legal empowerment, and incorporating traditional knowledge are crucial tactics to help ameliorate these problems. These steps are intended to lessen the damaging effects of illiteracy on forests and to advance environmentally friendly forest management.

== Conservation efforts ==
Several initiatives and organizations are working to protect and conserve the Nigerian lowland forests. The Nigerian government, along with international conservation organizations, has established protected areas and national parks to safeguard the biodiversity within these forests. Efforts are being made to promote sustainable land-use practices, reforestation, and community-based conservation programs. Local communities and indigenous groups are actively involved in conservation efforts, as their livelihoods and cultural heritage are intricately linked to the forests.

Conservation efforts in Nigerian lowland forests are crucial to protecting their biodiversity, ecosystem services, and the livelihoods of local communities. In Nigeria, some of the conservation initiatives in place include:

National parks in Nigeria

Protected Areas and National Parks: The Nigerian government has established protected areas and national parks to safeguard the Nigerian lowland forests. These areas, such as Cross River National Park, Okomu National Park, and Omo Forest Reserve, serve as important refuges for biodiversity. They provide legal protection to key forest habitats, restrict unsustainable activities, and support research and monitoring programs.

Community-based conservation: Engaging local communities in conservation efforts is vital for the long-term success of protecting Nigerian lowland forests. Community-based conservation initiatives involve collaboration with local residents, traditional leaders, and indigenous groups. These efforts focus on empowering communities, supporting sustainable livelihood alternatives, promoting traditional knowledge, and involving locals in forest management and decision-making processes.

Reforestation and restoration: Reforestation and restoration programs play a crucial role in conserving Nigerian lowland forests. These initiatives aim to restore degraded areas, establish buffer zones, and promote the recovery of native vegetation. Afforestation programs, such as planting of indigenous tree species, are undertaken to increase forest cover and connectivity, enhancing habitat availability for wildlife.

Sustainable land-use practices: Promoting sustainable land-use practices is essential to mitigate the threats posed by agriculture and land conversion. Agroforestry, which combines agriculture with tree planting, is encouraged as a way to maintain forest cover and provide sustainable livelihoods. Promoting organic farming, responsible logging practices, and reducing reliance on harmful agrochemicals are also part of sustainable land-use approaches.

Research and monitoring: Research studies and monitoring programs provide valuable insights into the status of Nigerian lowland forests, species richness, and ecosystem dynamics. These efforts help in identifying priority conservation areas, understanding the impacts of human activities, and informing evidence-based conservation strategies. Collaboration between scientists, research institutions, and conservation organizations is crucial for generating data and knowledge.

International collaborations: International collaborations and partnerships are important for conserving Nigerian lowland forests. Organizations like the International Union for Conservation of Nature (IUCN), Wildlife Conservation Society (WCS), and Rainforest Foundation work with local stakeholders and the Nigerian government to provide technical expertise, funding, and capacity-building support. These collaborations help strengthen conservation efforts and enable the sharing of best practices.

Policy and law enforcement: Effective policies and law enforcement mechanisms are essential for conserving Nigerian lowland forests. Strengthening legislation related to forest protection, implementing sustainable forest management practices, and enforcing regulations against illegal logging and wildlife trafficking are critical components. It requires cooperation among government agencies, law enforcement bodies, and local communities to ensure compliance and deter illegal activities.

Alternative Livelihood: A fundamental pillar of effective forest conservation lies in providing comprehensive training and support for alternative forms of income within local communities. This approach serves as a strategy in alleviating the pressure on forest resources. By equipping these communities with the knowledge, skills, and resources needed to pursue alternative livelihoods, they not only become economically empowered but it also actively mitigates the overexploitation of forests.

These communities can diversify their revenue streams by providing training and assistance for alternative vocations including farming, handicrafts, ecotourism, or small-scale businesses. This lessens their need to heavily exploit forest resources to support themselves.

Biodiversity is preserved when pressure on forests is reduced. There is less habitat loss, deforestation, and over-harvesting of plants and wildlife when communities rely less on the income from forests. In turn, this aids in preserving the variety.

== Research and education ==
Research studies are conducted in the Nigerian lowland forests to better understand the ecological processes, identify species richness, and assess the impacts of human activities. Educational programs and awareness campaigns are essential for promoting conservation values among local communities and raising awareness about the importance of preserving these forests for future generations.

== Protected areas ==
Nominally, about 17% of the ecoregion is under some form of official protection, including:

- Akure Ofosu Forest Reserve
- Gilli-Gilli Game Reserve
- Ifon Game Reserve
- Kwale Game Reserve
- Okomu National Park
- Omo Forest Reserve
- Orle River Game Reserve
- Owo Forest Reserve
