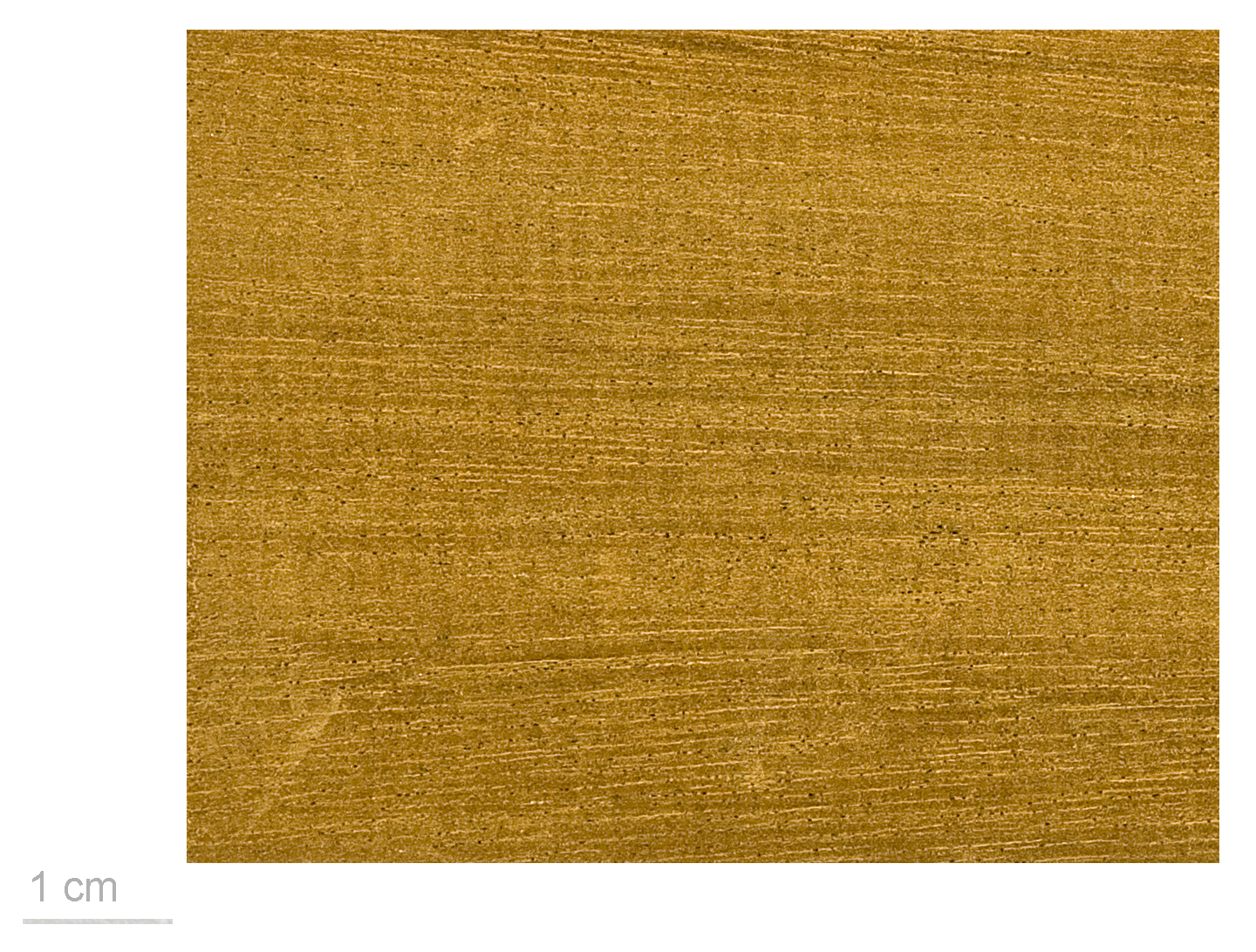
- Lovoa trichilioides

Scientific classification
- Kingdom: Plantae
- Clade: Tracheophytes
- Clade: Angiosperms
- Clade: Eudicots
- Clade: Rosids
- Order: Sapindales
- Family: Meliaceae
- Subfamily: Cedreloideae
- Genus: Lovoa; Harms

= Lovoa =

Genus of flowering plants

Lovoa is a genus of plants in the family Meliaceae. It contains the following species:

- Lovoa swynnertonii Baker f.
- Lovoa trichilioides Harms
