= Echuya Central Forest Reserve =

Protected area in southwestern Uganda

Coordinates: 1.28°S 29.82°E

Echuya central Forest Reserve
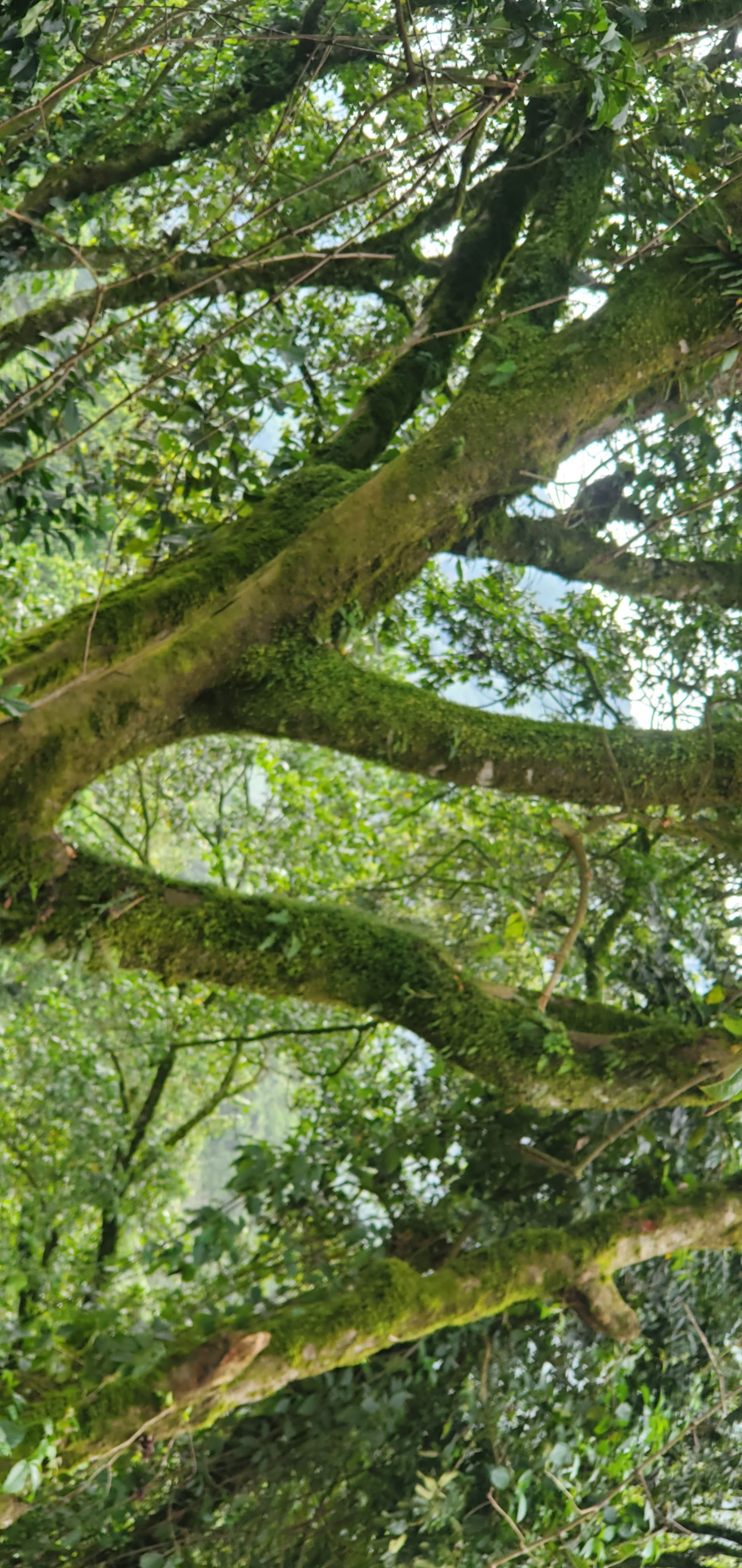
- Interactive map of Echuya central Forest Reserve

Geography
- Location: Bufumbira County, southwestern, Uganda

The Echuya Central Forest Reserve is a forest reserve in Uganda. This typical tropical rainforest covers approximately 34 km^{2} and is located at the intersection of Kisoro and Rubanda districts. It is one of the few remaining tropical rain forests in Uganda.

== Location ==
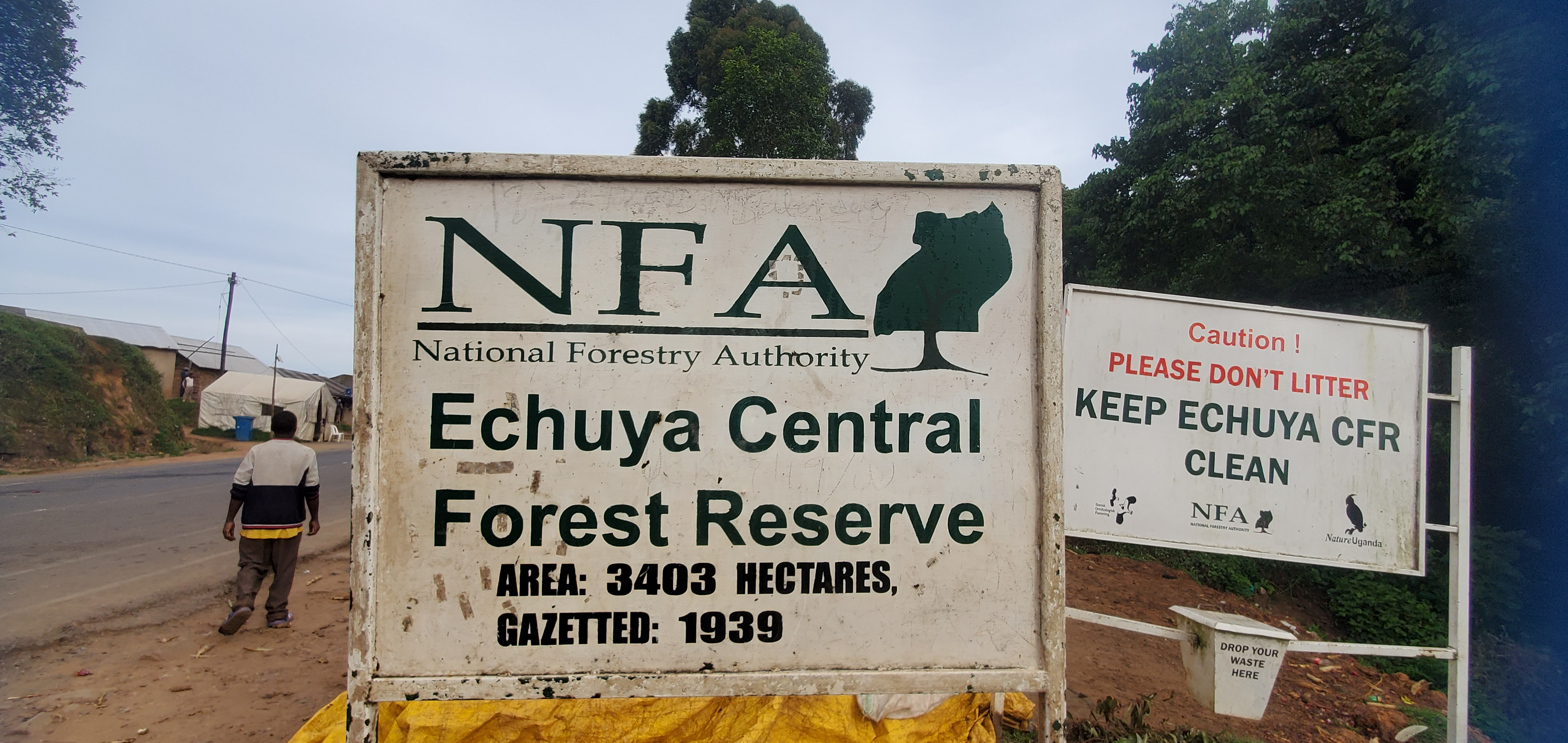
Echuya Forest Reserve

Echuya Central Forest Reserve is located in southwestern Uganda in Bufumbira County of Kisoro District and Rubanda County of Kabale District. This forest reserve can easily be accessed through the Kabale-Kisoro road. The drive from Kampala to Echuya Central Forest Reserve is about eight hours.

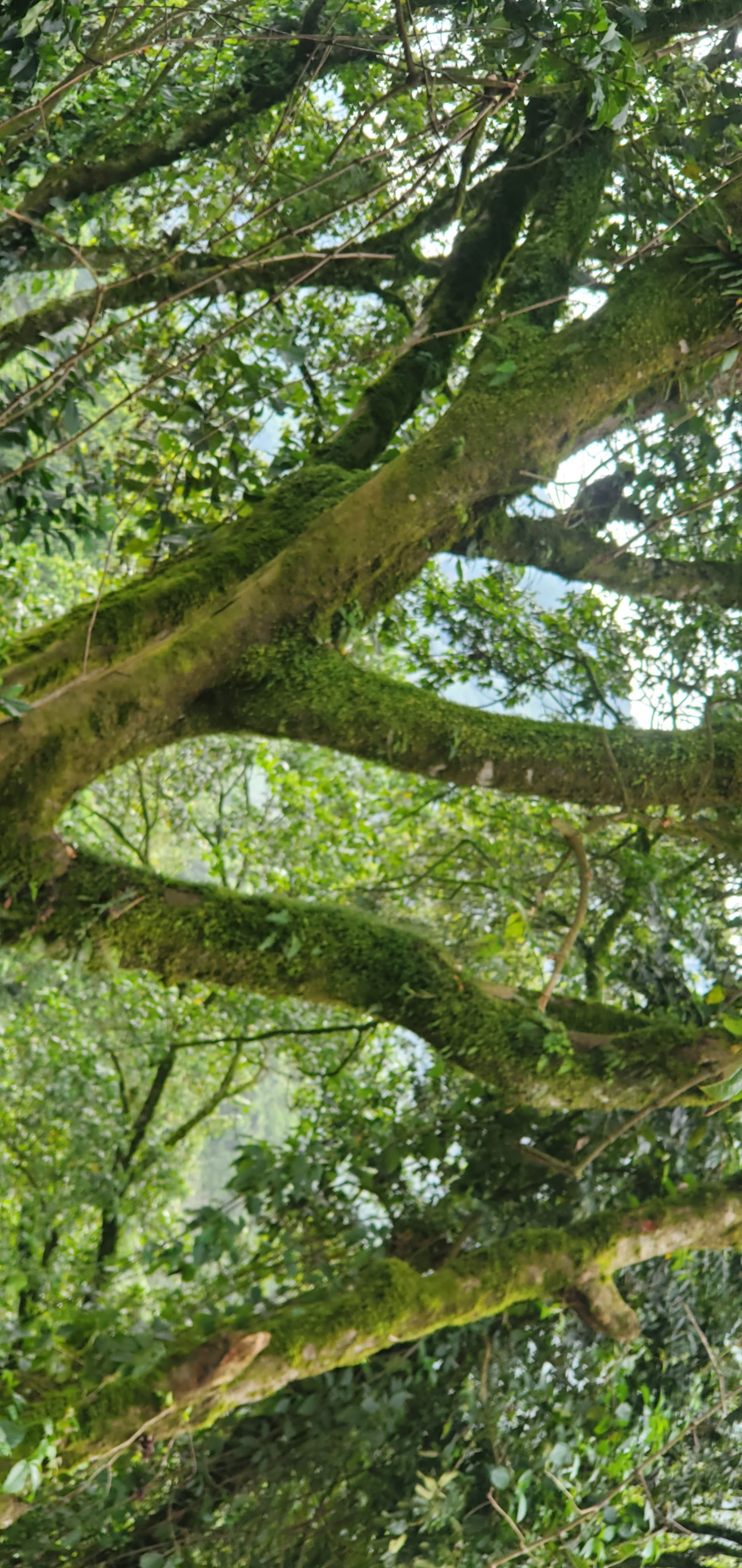
Trees in Echuya Central Forest Reserve

== Ecology ==
This forest is a global biodiversity site, and an Important Bird Area with many threatened and endemic bird species; of an estimated 153 bird species, 18 are endemic. Birds include the red-throated alethe, collared apalis, mountain masked apalis, Kivu ground thrush, red-faced woodland warbler, dwarf honeyguide, Archer's robin-chat, strange weaver, Doherty's bushshrike, regal sunbird, Rwenzori batis, white-eyed slaty flycatcher and others. Grauer's warbler is globally threatened.

The forest has a total of 127 tree species, 72 herb species, and 46 shrub species. Approximately 80% of the forest cover is mature Macaranga kilimandscharia and Hagenia abyssinica, and 20% is high-quality mountain bamboo known as Yushania alpina.

This forest was also the residence of Echuya Batwa people who used to hunt animals and gather fruit and firewood. Removed following the government's declaration of a forest reserve, these Batwa people live in at least eight settlements near Echuya's boundaries.

It is also a home to 10 recorded mammal species, including three carnivores: African golden cat (Caracal aurata), serval (Leptailurus serval) and side-striped jackal (Canis adustus). The forest also has 53 butterfly species and 43 moth species.
