= Buhoma, Uganda =

Village in Uganda

Buhoma is a village in Kanungu District, Western Region, Uganda. It lies at the northern entrance to Bwindi Impenetrable National Park, a site known for its mountain gorillas.

== History ==
Buhoma is inhabited by the Batwa people, hunter-gatherers. Anthropologists estimate Batwa presence in the region for over 60,000 years. In 1991, the Ugandan government officially designated the forest as Bwindi Impenetrable National Park. There was no effort to obtain the consent of the Twa people for this conservation effort. Two years later, in 1993, the Uganda Wildlife Authority (UWA) began organized gorilla tracking in Buhoma after habituating the first gorilla family for tourism. This marked the start of structured wildlife tourism in the area. Basic tourist facilities were established, including the Buhoma Community Rest Camp. Over time, additional gorilla groups were habituated, and more accommodation options, such as lodges and camps, were developed.

== Roads ==
In 2024, poor road conditions near Buhoma were reported to affect tourism by making travel more difficult and increasing the risk of accidents. In 2025, a tourist was killed and five others injured when a vehicle returning from gorilla tracking in the Bwindi Impenetrable National Park rolled off the road at Munyanga Bridge on the border of Buhoma and Butogota. Local government officials have criticized the Ugandan government for the condition of the roads.

== People and culture ==
Buhoma is home to Bakiga and Batwa communities. Local groups advocate for Batwa land rights and women's empowerment. Activist Sylvia Kokunda described these efforts in a 2021 interview with Minority Rights Group International. A Guardian photo essay the same year documented Batwa life near Buhoma. The Batwa people now participate in the tourism economy.

== Economy and environment ==
The growth of gorilla tourism led to increased economic activity. Local residents became involved in guiding, hospitality, crafts, and related services. Infrastructure, including health and education facilities, also expanded. Tourism strains waste management systems. Research by Kabale University in 2024 found inadequate disposal facilities in Buhoma's tourism area. Some scholars have argued that the community-based tourism model hasb been a success. Some Batwa have produced handcrafted baskets that are sold internationally to provide income.
