= Bwindi Impenetrable Forest =

Forest of Uganda

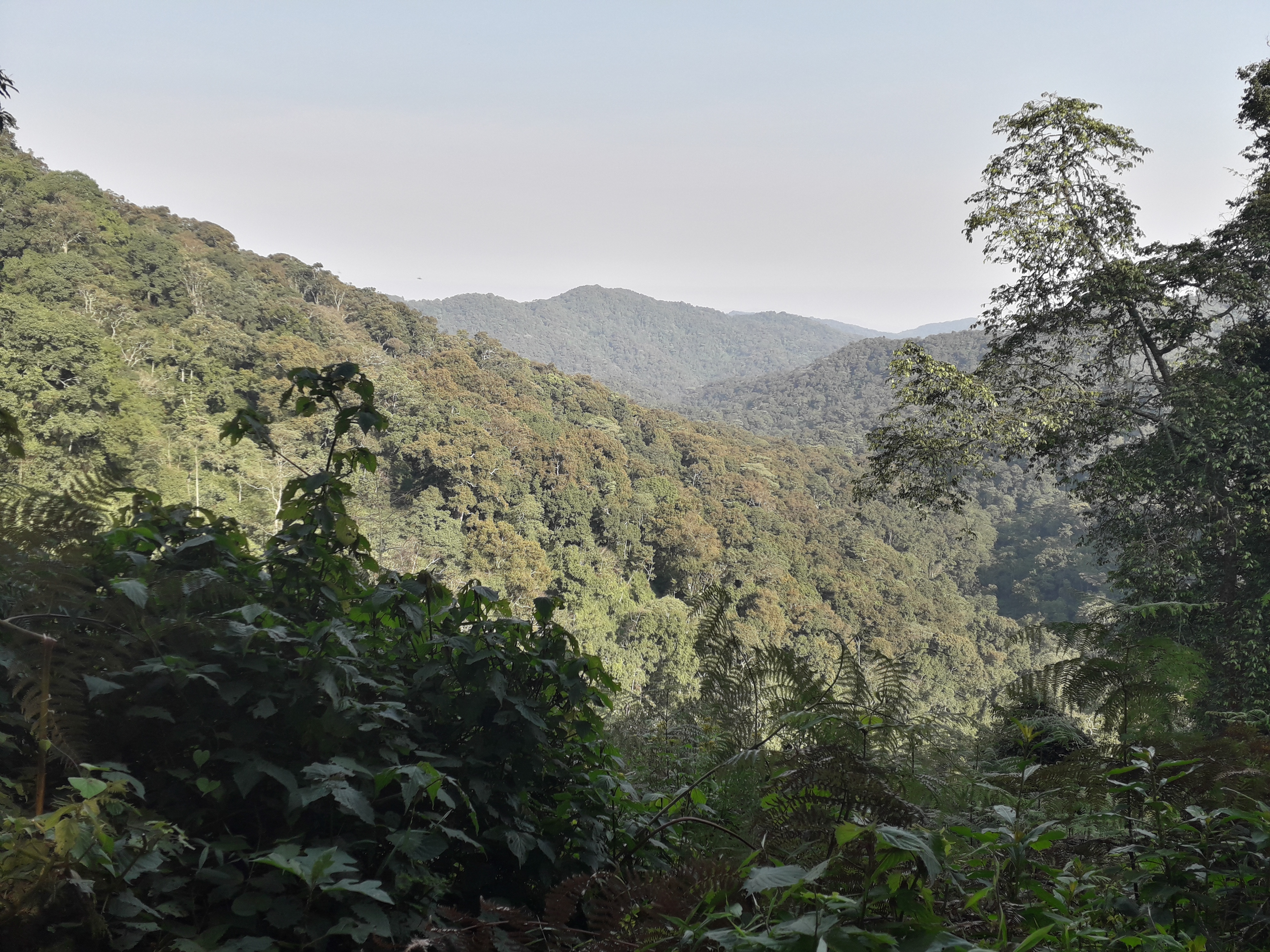

- Location within Uganda
- Location: Kanungu District, Uganda
- Nearest city: Kanungu
- Area: 331 km^{2} (128 sq mi)
- Governing body: National Environment Management Authority of Uganda
- Website: https://bwindiimpenetrablenationalpark.com

UNESCO World Heritage Site
- Type: Natural
- Criteria: vii, x
- Designated: 1994 (18th session)
- Reference no.: 682
- Region: Africa

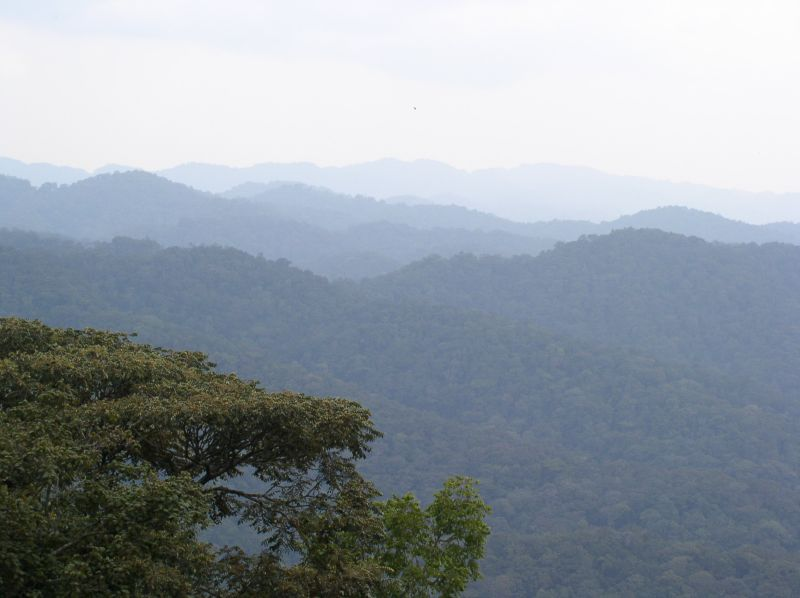
Mountains of Bwindi

The Bwindi Impenetrable Forest is a large primeval forest located in south-western Uganda and is located in three districts of Kisoro, Kabale and Kanungu. The Bwindi forest is on the edge of the Albertine Rift, the western branch of the East African Rift, at elevations ranging from 1,160 to 2,607 metres (3,806 to 8,553 ft). The forest contains around 160 species of trees and over 100 species of ferns. Bwindi Impenetrable Forest Reserve was set up in 1942 on the rim of the Rift Valley.

== Origin of name ==
The name Bwindi is derived from the Runyakitara word Mubwindi and means "a place full of darkness". This name comes from the extensive stands of bamboo interspersed amongst the larger forest hardwoods. The bamboo and thick ground cover of ferns, vines, and other plant growth severely hinder direct access on foot. Also known as the "Place of Darkness", the forest is on the edge of the western arm of the Great Rift Valley, only a few kilometers from the Democratic Republic of the Congo (DRC) border and about 25 kilometres (16 mi) north of the Virunga Mountains.

== Wildlife ==
The forest is one of the most biologically diverse areas on Earth. Half of the world's population of the endangered mountain gorillas live within its borders. The forest has been recognized by the United Nations Educational, Scientific and Cultural Organization as a World Heritage Site for its biological significance.

At present the forest is believed to contain 120 mammal species, 348 bird species, 220 butterfly species and 27 frog species. Included among the mammals are forest elephants and yellow-backed duikers. While mountain gorillas are the most notable of the forest's primates, other residents include chimpanzees, blue monkeys, l’Hoest’s monkeys, red-tailed monkeys, vervet monkeys and black-and-white colobus monkeys. The forest's birds include great blue turacos, black-billed turacos, black bee-eaters, African green broadbills, handsome francolins, African black ducks and Cassin’s grey flycatchers, white-tailed blue flycatcher, brown-necked parrot, and white-bellied robin chat.

Recent confirmations by the Uganda Wildlife Authority have verified the presence of chimpanzees within Bwindi Impenetrable Forest. Although Bwindi is globally renowned for its mountain gorilla population, this discovery highlights the park's broader primate diversity. The forest’s dense biodiversity and remote terrain had long made it difficult to confirm the chimpanzee presence, but ongoing monitoring and conservation efforts have now established their existence within the park. This adds to Bwindi Impenetrable National Park’s status as one of the few forests in Africa known to host both mountain gorillas and chimpanzees in the same ecosystem.

Updates can be found at the Uganda Wildlife Authority's website.

== Socioeconomic struggles ==
The forest has been described as "Riven by disputes and crosshatched by historical, political, and biological borders" by researcher Craig Stanford, co-director of the park's Jane Goodall Research Center. The forest is the traditional home of the Batwa people, a marginalized community within Ugandan society.

== Establishment of a national park ==
In 1991, the Bwindi Impenetrable National Park was established, adjacent to the Uganda, Rwanda and DRC border region. The park was created to protect the forest's mountain gorilla population from poachers and habitat destruction. Gorilla treks are led on a daily basis into different sections of the forest so that trekkers can see the mountain gorillas and in doing so generate necessary funds for the protection of these endangered primates. The Batwa people lost their traditional hunting grounds through the establishment of the park.

== Transportation ==
Reaching Bwindi Impenetrable Forest can be done by road or air. By road, most travelers drive from Kampala, the capital of Uganda, which takes about 8–10 hours, passing through scenic towns like Mbarara and Kabale. For a faster option, domestic flights are available from Entebbe or Kampala to airstrips near Bwindi, such as Kisoro or Kabale, followed by a short drive to the park. Regardless of the route, it’s recommended to arrange transportation in advance, especially if one is planning to take part in safari activities.

== See also ==
- Dian Fossey
- Bwindi Impenetrable National Park
