= Akure Ofosu Forest Reserve =

Protected area in Ondo State, Nigeria

- IUCN category V (protected landscape/seascape)
- Location within Nigeria
- Location: Ondo State, Nigeria
- Nearest city: Akure
- Coordinates: 6.963°N 5.354°E
- Area: 394 km^{2} (152 sq mi)

The Akure Forest Reserve is situated in Ondo State, Nigeria's Akure South Local Government Area, a tropical rainforest. It has a total area of approximately 40,000 hectares (99,000 acres) (Note: Sources vary on the size of the preserve, with values of 40,330 hectares (99,700 acres) and 39,400 hectares (97,000 acres) found in the literature.) and it is located between latitudes 7°16' and 7°18' N and longitudes 5°9' and 5°11' E.

Akure Ofosu is of great importance for the conservation of the chimpanzee population in Nigeria. Research conducted during 2007 found 33 nests at four locations, without direct vision.

== History ==
Established in 1936 and comprising some 400 square kilometres (150 sq mi), Akure-Ofosu Forest Reserve also borders the Ala, Owo, and Ohosu altogether forming one of the largest areas of forest reserve in Nigeria. The forests contained within, are home to many different species, including threatened primates. Red-capped mangabeys (Cercocebus torquatus), Nigerian white-throated guenons (Cercopithecus erythrogaster pococki), putty-nosed monkeys (Cercopithecus nictitans), mona monkeys (Cercopithecus mona), and others can all be found in what remains of Akure-Ofosu's forests.

Southwest Nigeria and the Niger Delta are priority areas for chimpanzee surveys, according to the Regional Action Plan for the Conservation of Chimpanzees in West Africa. The discussions from a workshop on the conservation of West African chimpanzees conducted in Abidjan, Cote d'Ivoire in September 2002 served as the foundation for that regional plan. Chimpanzee populations in western Nigeria were poorly understood, considered to be seriously threatened, and in need of a conservation strategy.

== Economic benefit ==
In Akure Ofosu forest reserve, the woods serve as the source of raw materials for numerous industries, promote job creation, improve the quality of the environment, and greatly contribute to food production. Forestry is necessary for the residents of the forest reserves to maintain a sustainable standard of living. Akure Ofosu Forest Reserve is known to produce a wide range of non-timber forest products, including chewing sticks, fruits, nuts, honey, fuel wood, and leaves.

Elujulo et al. have suggested that the loss of forestland in this and other Nigerian reserves may be due to the populations resident within the preserves who need to convert preserve land to crop farming. Current forestry management strategies that restrict accessibility to the preserves have been identified as a major driver of household poverty within the forest communities.
