= Akure Forest Reserve =

Protected area in southwest Nigeria

- IUCN category V (protected landscape/seascape)
- Location within Nigeria
- Location: Ondo State, Nigeria
- Nearest city: Akure
- Coordinates: 7.296°N 5.03°E
- Area: 66 km^{2} (25 sq mi)

Akure Forest Reserve is a protected area in southwest Nigeria, covering 66 km^{2} (25 mi^{2}).

In recent decades, there has been a large deforestation in this area, which has a large impact on the environment. Akure Forest reserve is a forested area set aside for preservation or controlled use and located at Ile Oluji/Okeigbo, Ondo State, Nigeria, with a Latitude of 7° 17′ 39″ N and Longitude of 5° 2′ 3″ E.
