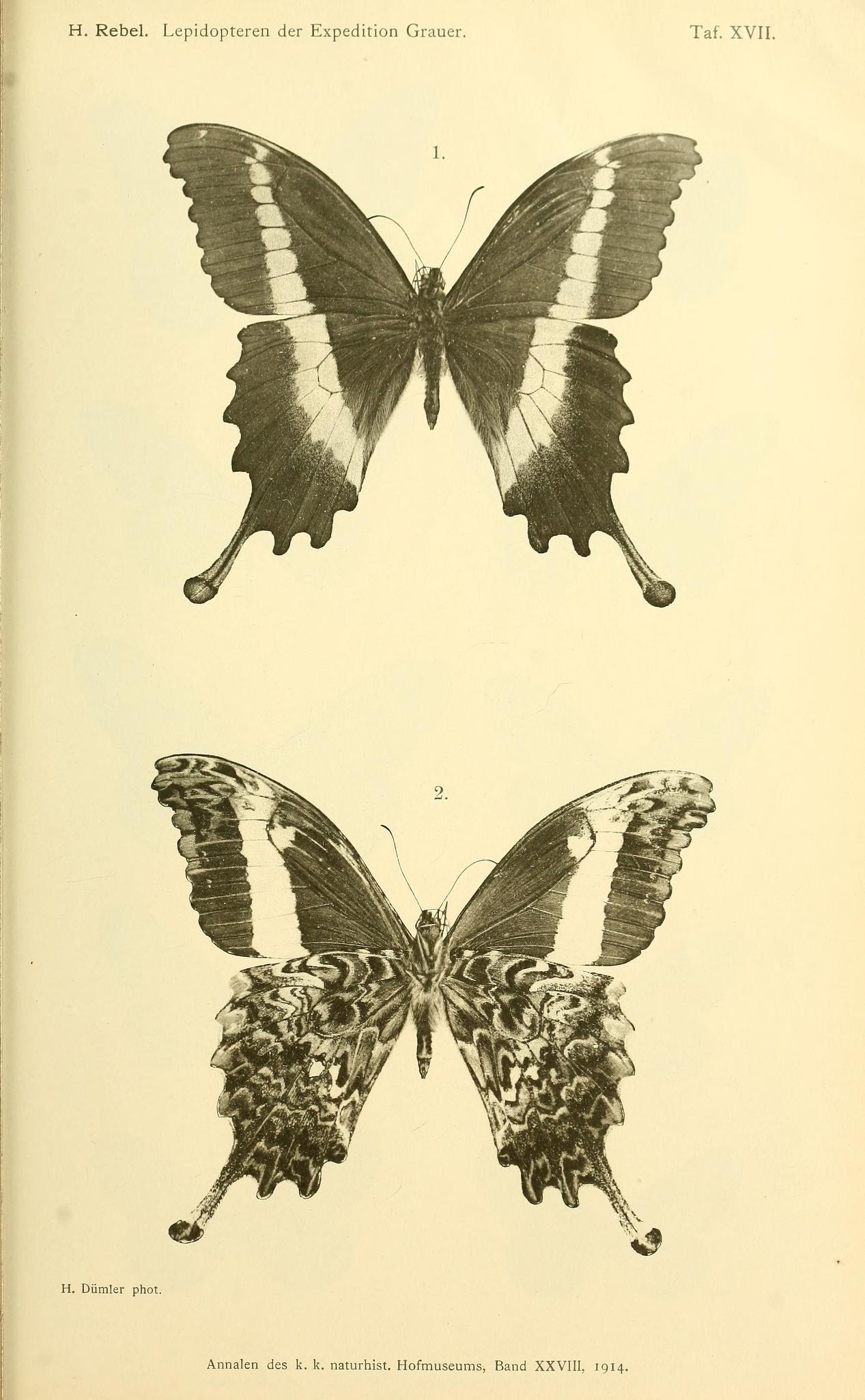

Conservation status
- Vulnerable (IUCN 2.3)

Scientific classification
- Kingdom: Animalia
- Phylum: Arthropoda
- Clade: Pancrustacea
- Class: Insecta
- Order: Lepidoptera
- Family: Papilionidae
- Genus: Papilio
- Species: P. leucotaenia

Binomial name
- Papilio leucotaenia Rothschild, 1908

= Papilio leucotaenia =

Species of butterfly

Papilio leucotaenia, the cream-banded swallowtail, is a species of butterfly in the family Papilionidae. It is found in the Democratic Republic of the Congo, Burundi, Rwanda, and Uganda. The habitat consists of forests at altitudes ranging from 2,100 to 2,300 meters. (Albertine Rift montane forests)

External images

== See also ==
- Nyungwe Forest
