= Lovoa swynnertonii =

Conservation status
- Near Threatened (IUCN 3.1)

Scientific classification
- Kingdom: Plantae
- Clade: Tracheophytes
- Clade: Angiosperms
- Clade: Eudicots
- Clade: Rosids
- Order: Sapindales
- Family: Meliaceae
- Genus: Lovoa
- Species: L. swynnertonii

Binomial name
- Lovoa swynnertonii Baker f.

Species of flowering plant

Lovoa swynnertonii, also called brown mahogany or Kilimanjaro mahogany, is a species of plant in the family Meliaceae. It is a tree native to Cameroon, the Democratic Republic of the Congo, Kenya, Mozambique, Tanzania, Uganda, and Zimbabwe. It is an evergreen tree which can grow up to 50 metres tall. It grows in lowland and lower montane tropical moist forest from 180 to 1,600 metres elevation. It is threatened by habitat loss from logging and forest clearance for agricultural expansion. Plantations have been unsuccessful because of infestation by the mahogany shoot borer Hypsipyla.
