= Craig Stanford =

American biological anthropologist

- Born: New Jersey
- Scientific career
- Fields: Evolutionary Biology, Biological Anthropology, Primatology, Herpetology

Craig Stanford (born 1956) is an American evolutionary biologist and conservation biologist, Professor of Biological Sciences and Anthropology at the University of Southern California.

== Academic research ==
Craig Stanford is also a Research Associate in Herpetology at the Natural History Museum of Los Angeles County. He is known for his field studies of the behavior, ecology and conservation biology of chimpanzees, mountain gorillas and other tropical animals, and has published nearly 200 scientific papers and 20 books on animal behavior, human evolution and wildlife conservation. He is best known for his field study of the predator–prey ecology of chimpanzees and the animals they hunt in Gombe National Park, Tanzania, and for his long-term study of the behavior and ecology of chimpanzees and mountain gorillas in Bwindi Impenetrable National Park, Uganda. He is the author of the forthcoming "Cold-Blooded Murder: Reptiles and Amphibians on the Brink of Extinction (Columbia University Press, 2026).

As a herpetologist he is involved in research and conservation of tortoises and turtles. He is Chair of the IUCN SSC Tortoise and Freshwater Turtle Specialist Group, and is on the board of the Turtle Conservancy.

== Background ==
Stanford received his BA in anthropology and zoology at Drew University, his MA in anthropology at Rutgers University, and his PhD in biological anthropology at the University of California, Berkeley in 1990. He taught at the University of Michigan and joined the University of Southern California in 1992. He has received numerous grants from the National Science Foundation, National Geographic Society, Wenner Gren Foundation, Leakey Foundation, among others. He has also received several major teaching and research awards at USC. He lectures widely in the U.S. and abroad.

He has been a founding board member of vildwerk., a nonprofit organization inspiring conservation awareness through dance, since 2022.

== Selected bibliography ==
- "On the Brink in the Golden State: California’s Most Endangered Animals," forthcoming.
- "Cold-Blooded Murder," 2026
- "Unnatural Habitat," 2024
- "The Turtle Crisis," 2024
- Biological Anthropology: The Natural History of Humankind, (with John Allen and Susan Antón); 5th edition 2024
- The New Chimpanzee: a 21st Century Portrait of Our Closest Kin, 2018, Harvard University Press. Publication date: March 19, 2018; 288 pages. ISBN ISBN 978-0674977112
- Exploring Biological Anthropology, (with John Allen and Susan Antón); 4th edition 2016.
- "Evolution: What Every Teenager Should Know," 2014
- Planet Without Apes, 2012. Belknap Press (Harvard Univ Press), 273 pages, ISBN 978-0674071650.
- The Last Tortoise, 2010
- Beautiful Minds, 2008 (with Maddalena Bearzi)
- Apes of the Impenetrable Forest, 2007
- Upright : The Evolutionary Key to Becoming Human, 2003
- Significant Others: The Ape-Human Continuum and the Quest for Human Nature, 2001
- The Hunting Apes : Meat Eating and the Origins of Human Behavior, 1999
- Meat-Eating and Human Evolution, 2001 (with co-editor H. Bunn)
- Chimpanzee and Red Colobus : The Ecology of Predator and Prey, 1998

== See also ==
- Biological anthropology
- Primatology
- Herpetology
- Turtles
- Conservation
