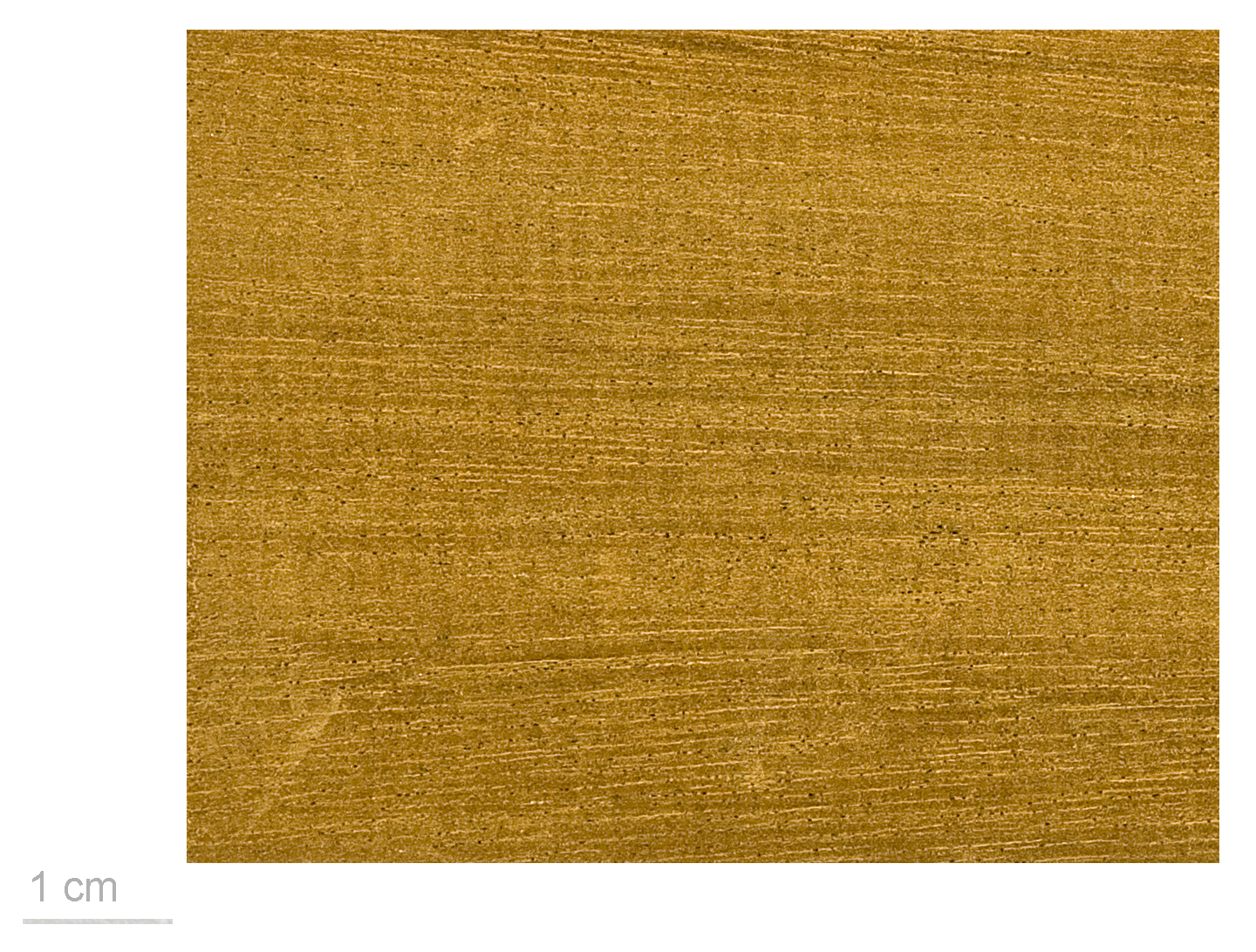

Conservation status
- Least Concern (IUCN 3.1)

Scientific classification
- Kingdom: Plantae
- Clade: Tracheophytes
- Clade: Angiosperms
- Clade: Eudicots
- Clade: Rosids
- Order: Sapindales
- Family: Meliaceae
- Genus: Lovoa
- Species: L. trichilioides

Binomial name
- Lovoa trichilioides Harms

= Lovoa trichilioides =

Species of flowering plant

Lovoa trichilioides, also called African walnut, Congowood, dibetou or tigerwood, is a species of tree in the family Meliaceae found in Central Africa. The timber provides high chatoyance, with an average value above 20 PZC.

It is threatened by habitat loss, but is listed as IUCN3.1, a species of least concern.

== Range ==
The tree is found in Angola, Cameroon, the Republic of the Congo, the Democratic Republic of the Congo, Ivory Coast, Gabon, Ghana, Liberia, Nigeria, Sierra Leone, Tanzania, and Uganda.

== Status ==
Germination success is somewhat limited by short-lived seeds which are heavily predated. Exploitation rates are high. It is one of the two principal timber species in Congo.

It is threatened by habitat loss, but is listed as IUCN3.1, a species of least concern.
