= Echuya Batwa =

Ugandan tribe

Kisoro District in Uganda

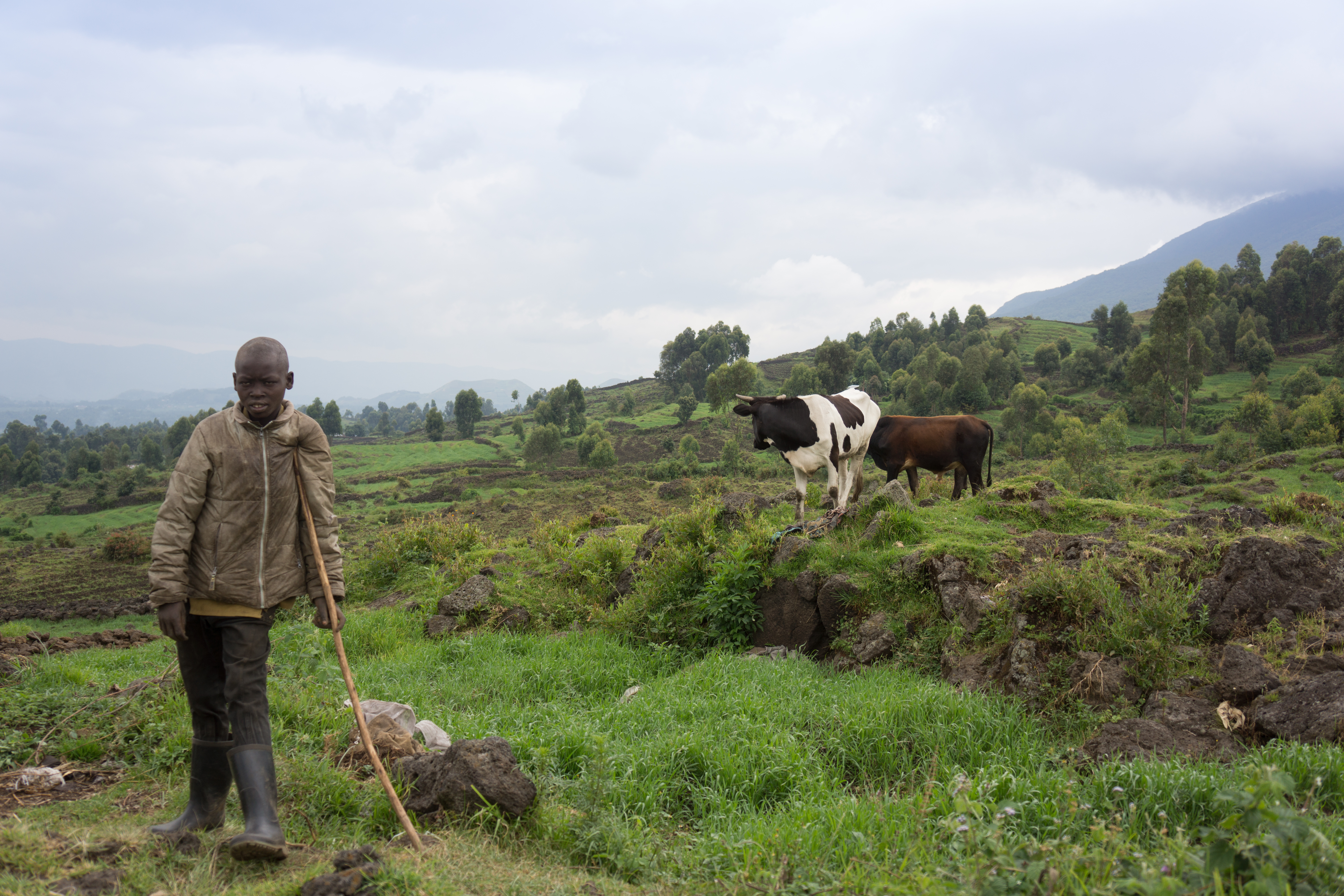
Batwa child grazing cattle

Echuya Batwa, commonly known as pygmies, are an endangered group of people around Echuya Forest Reserve in Kisoro and Kabale Districts of South-Western Uganda. The Echuya is located in the Albertine Rift region recognized as an important eco-region. The Batwa are believed to have migrated from the Ituri Forest of the Democratic Republic of Congo in search of wild animals to hunt, hence the name Kisoro, literally meaning "the area occupied by wild animals". The Batwa live in small huts mainly made from sticks and grass, and number 6,700 per a 2014 estimate by the Uganda Bureau of Statistics.

== Overview ==
Originally, Batwa were forest-dwelling hunter-gatherers based in the Great Lakes region of Central Africa, and are widely accepted as the original inhabitants of the region. As their traditional forest lands and territories fell under the control of agro-industries and conservation agencies, the Batwa became squatters living on the edges of society. The establishment of the Bwindi and Mgahinga National Parks for Mountain Gorillas in 1991 enabled the authorities to evict the Batwa definitively from the forest. The Batwa in Uganda (today) experience systematic and pervasive discrimination from the government and other sectors of society, and their rights as indigenous peoples are neither recognized nor respected.

A Batwa child takes part in preparing food using a traditional handmade pot during the evening in a community near Mgahinga Gorilla National Park.

== Geography ==
The Batwa people live in the southwestern portion of Uganda, namely, in the districts of Bundibugyo, Kisoro, Kanungu, Kabale, and Rubanda.

=== Echuya Forest Reserve ===
Echuya was gazetted in 1939 as a forest reserve.

Echuya Forest Reserve is located in the most densely populated area where, the average land holding per household is 0.8 ha and population density is 353.9 persons per km^{2}. According to the National Population and Housing Census (2002), Batwa population in Uganda was 3500. Other than Batwa, the forest is surrounded by Bakiga, Hutu and Tutsi who comprise a bigger percentage of the population. Bakiga are commonly referred to by Batwa as Bairu. Batwa comprise about 5% of the population (Plumptre et al. 2004). Their households are scattered in various settlements in villages located adjacent to the forest. They include: Murubindi, Kashasha; Gitebe-Kanaba, Biizi-Rugeshi–Murora, Mukasaayi that comprises two settlements, Karengyere-Rwamahano and Kinyarushengye.

== Demographics ==
As of 2014, the Uganda Bureau of Statistics estimates that there are approximately 6,700 Batwa people in Uganda, comprising 0.2% of the country's population. This estimation is higher than that found in the 2002 National Population and Housing Census, which estimated their population to be 3,500.

=== Health ===
In October 2021, the PBS Newshour reported that the Batwa population in Uganda has a life expectancy of just 28 years, and that about 40% of children do not survive to the age of five. One Ugandan doctor said that the discrimination many Batwa face in Ugandan society has made it harder for the Batwa to access healthcare. Health issues facing the Batwa include malnutrition, pneumonia, respiratory tract infections, and HIV/AIDS. Alcohol addiction also afflicts many Batwa, particularly men.

== Economic livelihood ==
In a report on the Batwa people in October 2021, a reporter for the PBS Newshour called the Batwa "among the poorest inhabitants of one of the world's poorest countries". Major sources of income for the Batwa include the tourism sector and agricultural work.

Many Batwa have little or no formal education, and approximately 10% of Batwa children are enrolled in school as of 2021.

=== Land issues ===
Following the expulsion of many Batwa from protected forests in Uganda in 1991, and the deforestation of much of the land they live on, the way of life for many Batwa has changed significantly. Oftentimes, this expulsion was done without community consultation, consent, and compensation. Violence was employed to force the Batwa to relocate, which frequently entailed the destruction of their homes and property, and the killing of their livestock. Early attempts at "multiple-use zones" were employed to enable the Batwa to live in protected areas, but these resulted in no material changes, and were quickly abandoned due to what the African International Christian Ministry (AICM), a Ugandan non-governmental organization, called "flawed implementation and institutional discrimination". As a result, the Batwa people have little means of economic opportunity, and face a high rate of poverty.

Since the expulsion of the Batwa in 1991, the Ugandan government has introduced legal documents which include stated aims to help the country's disenfranchised, such as the Batwa. Affirmative action was enshrined in the Fourth Constitution of Uganda, and the 2013 National Land Policy highlighted the need to "redress historical injustices to protect the land rights of groups and communities marginalized by history or on the basis of gender, religion, ethnicity and other forms of vulnerability to achieve balanced growth and social equity". Furthermore, The Land Act of 1998 stated that the government will "recognize and protect the right to ancestral lands of ethnic minority groups", and "pay prompt, adequate and fair compensation to ethnic minority groups that are displaced from their ancestral land by government action". This last law has enabled the Batwa to engage in limited access and usage of their ancestral lands.

Despite this stated intent on the part of the Ugandan government, the Batwa suffer from what the AICM calls "severe landlessness". The Uganda Wildlife Authority launched a short-lived initiative to employ local Batwa to serve as tour guides to the Garama Cave, a tourist attraction on Batwa ancestral land, but scrapped it February 2013 when a group of Batwa people sent a petition to the Constitutional Court of Uganda to gain redress for their exile.

The Adventist Development and Relief Agency, a group affiliated with the Seventh Day Adventist Church, currently rents out portions of farmland nearby for the purpose of training local Batwa in agriculture. Few Batwa own agricultural land, although the land is often less than 1 acre (0.40 ha) per household, is often agricultural unproductive, and is located in hard-to-reach hilly terrain near the forest. The land was obtained from development agencies such as the Adventist Development and Relief Agency, BMCT (Bwindi Mgahinga Conservation Trust) and AICM (African International Christian Ministry). However, before the declaration of the Echuya as a central government forest reserve, the forest was heavily encroached upon. Up to now, some activities such as wild hunting, collection of honey, mushrooms, water, bamboo for basket making, building poles, making of bee hives and fire wood are being carried out by both Batwa and non-Batwa dominant ethnic communities. Many Batwa illegally hunt in the forest due to lack of alternative sources of proteins. The forest is also of cultural importance to the Batwa, who offer religious sacrifices to their gods.

==== Batwa's access to Echuya Forest Resources ====
The Forestry Nature Conservation Master Plan (FNCMP) of Uganda (1999) underpins Echuya Forest Reserve as one of the forests that have been selected for CFM (Collaborative Forest Management) involving participation of local communities including Batwa in resource protection, management and planning of nature reserves. The 1999 FNCMP further focuses on equitable utilization of forest resources amongst the communities adjacent to the forest. This led to formation of CFM groups at parish and sub-county levels, which are mostly dominated by non-Batwa who for long have marginalized the Batwa. Batwa interests were therefore not fully met when the communities were being assisted to negotiate, draft and finally sign CFM agreements with the National Forestry Authority.

== See also ==
- Batwa
