= List of central forest reserves of Uganda =

In Uganda, a Central Forest Reserve is a body of forest or woodland managed by the National Forestry Authority (NFA) under the National Forestry and Tree Planting Act 8/2003.

The NFA is mandated to manage all 506 Central Forest Reserves in Uganda. These reserves are part of the protected areas of Uganda. The total area of land covered is 12,657.47 km^{2} or 6.3% of the total land area of Uganda. They compose of natural forest like moist semi-deciduous forests and forest plantations mainly of pine and eucalyptus species. Legal activities done under the NFA are harvesting timber, re-planting and tourism.

List of Central Forest Reserves in Uganda:

Rank	Name	Geodata	Size in km^{2}	District	Notes
1	Budongo	01°48′22″N 31°34′42″E	817	Masindi/Hoima	
2	Bugoma	01°15′20″N 30°58′00″E	400	Kikuube District	
3	Buhungiro	00°29′03″N 30°56′00″E	11	Kyegegwa	
4	Bujawe		50	Hoima	
5	Bundekiki		5	Bundibugyo	
6	Bwambara	00°40′48″S 29°49′26″E	0.4	Rukungiri	
7	Echuya	01°17′53″S 29°15′00″E	36	Kisoro	
8	Fort Portal		0.7	Kabarole	
9	Fumbya		4	Masindi	
10	Guramwa		15	Kibale	
11	Ibamba		3	Hoima	
12	Ibambaro		37	Kabarole	
13	Ihimbo	00°40′48″S 29°49′26″E	5	Rukungiri	
14	Itwara		87	Kabarole	
15	Kabale		1.3	Kabale	
16	Kabango-Mutandi		3.6	Bundibugyo	
17	Kagadi		0.12	Kibaale	
18	Kagombe		178	Kibaale	
19	Kagura		43	Kabarole	
20	Kahurokobwire		11	Hoima	
21	Kakasi		7.8	Kabarole	
22	Kalinzu	0°24′43″S 30°04′48″E	140	Bushenyi	
23	Kananga		6.6	Kibaale	
24	Kandanda-Ngobya		27	Hoima	
25	Kaniabizo		0.39	Rukungiri	
26	Kapchorwa		0.06	Kapchorwa	
27					
28	Kasato		26	Kibale	
29	Kasokwa		0.69	Masindi	
30	Kasongoire		12	Masindi	
31	Kashoya-Kitomi	0°14′47″S 30°15′01″E	384	Bushenyi/Mbarara	
32	Kibego		13	Kabarole	
33	Kibeka		96	Masindi	
34	Kigulya Hill		4.11	Masindi	
35	Kihaimira		5.5	Kibale	
36	Kijuna		12	Kibale	
37	Kikumiro		7.2	Kabarole	
38	Kitechura		53	Kabarole	
39	Kitony Hill		2.99	Masindi	
39	Kyahaiguru		4.27	Hoima	
40	Kyamugongo		1.19	Hoima	
41	Kyamurangi		4.22	Kibale	
42	Kyanthue		2.03	Rukungiri	
43	Kyahara		4.81	Kabarole	
44	Mabira	00°27′48″N 33°00′29″E	300	Buikwe	
45	Mafuga		37	Kabarole	
46	Maseege		9.37	Masindi	
47	Mataa		1.06	Bundibugyo	
48	Matiri		55	Kabarole	
49	Mburamaizi		5.04	Rukungiri	
50	Mpanga		4.53	Mpigi	
51	Mubuku		17	Kasese	
52	Muhangi		19	Kabarole	
53	Muhunga		4.12	Kibale	
54	Mukihani		37	Hoima	
55	Muko		1.67	Kabale	
56	Musoma		2.7	Masindi	
57	Nakuyazo		3.48	Kibale	
58	Nkera		7.5	Kabarole	
59	North Rwenzori		35	Bundibugyo/Ntoroko	
60	Nsekuro Hill		1.3	Masindi	
61	Nyabigoye		4.77	Kibale	
62	Nyabiku		3.73	Kibale	
63	Nyburongo		1.72	Bundibugyo	
64	Nyabyeya		3.55	Masindi	
65	Nyakarongo		35	Kibale	
66	Nyakunyu		4.6	Masindi	
67	Nyamakere		39	Kiryandongo	
68	Oruha		3.45	Kabarole	
69	Rukara		4.5	Kibale	
70	Rukungiri		0.24	Rukungiri	
71	Kasyoha – Kitomi	0.1895°S 30.2967°E	433	Bushenyi	433
72	Rushaya		0.29	Rukungiri	
73	Ruzaire		12	Kibale	
74	Rwengeye		3.23	Kibale	329
75	Rwengiri		1.55	Rukungiri	
76	Rwensama		1.21	Masindi	
77	Rwensambya		6.72	Kabarole	
78	Wambabya		34	Hoima	
79	Kangombe			Kibaale	
80	Kapimpini			Nakaseke	
81	Zoka			Adjumani	
82	Nyamwasa			Mubende	
83	Kasenyi			Mubende	
84	Kaweri			Mubende	
85	Kisombwa			Mubende	
86	Namatale			Mbale	
87	Soroto			Kapelebyong	
88	Kasaato			Kibaale	
89	Bweizigoro			Kiboga and Kyankwanzi	
90	Taala			Kiboga and Kyankwanzi	
91	Luwunga			Kiboga and Kyankwanzi	
92	Nkeera			Kyenjojo	
93	Kitekyura			Kyenjojo	
94	South Imaramagambo			Rukungiri	Jointly managed by NFA and UWA
95	Rubabo			Rukungiri	
96	Kebisoni			Rukungiri	
97	Kagogo			Rukungiri	
98	Rumira				
99	Kasagala			Nakasongola	
100	Gulu			Gulu	
101	Agora Agwu			Kitgum	
102	Kaduku			Masindi	
103	Bukaleba			Mayuge	
104	Kimaka			Jinja	
105	West Bugwe			Mbale	
106	Mbale			Mbale	
107	Soroti			Soroti	
108	Gangu			Butambala	
109	Kitubulu			Entebbe	
110	Kyewaga			Entebbe	
111	Kajansi			Wakiso	
112	Kasana			Mubende	
113	Kadam			Nakapiripirit	
114	Mt Moroto			Moroto	
115	Nyangea Napore			Kabong	
116	Akur			Abim	
117	Lutoboka			Kalangala	
118	Kampala			Kalangala	
119	Mujuzi			Masaka	
120	Kumbu			Masaka	
121	Mbarara			Mbarara	
122	Ntugamo			Ntugamo	
123	Arua			Arua	
124	Laura			Arua	
125	Mt Kei			Koboko	
126	Mwenge			Kyenjojo	
127	North Maramagambo		29294.34	Bushenyi	Jointly managed by NFA and UWA
128	Rwoho		91	Rwampara and Isingiro	
129	Bugamba		1210 ha	Rwampara	
130	Nakindiba		142 ha	Wakiso	

== See also ==
- Albertine Rift montane forests
- Bwamba Forest
- Bwindi Impenetrable Forest
- Kibale Forest
- List of Local Forest Reserves of Uganda
