= Kapimpini Central Forest Reserve =

Protected area in Nakaseke, Uganda

- Kapimpini Forest
- IUCN category III (natural monument or feature)
- Location within Uganda
- Location: Nakaseke District
- Coordinates: 0.9911°N 32.0641°E
- Established: 1967
- Governing body: National Forestry Authority

Kapimpini Central Forest Reserve is a protected high forest located in Nakaseke district, Uganda. It covers a total area of 6,068 hectares (60.78 km^{2}). It was designated as a forest reserve in 1967. It is under the management of National Forestry Authority.

== Conservation status ==
In 2009, 71 hectares of the forest had been deforested

Over 2,000 residents who settled in Kapimpini Forest Reserve accused Nakaseke District Security Internal officer (DISO) and his deputy for threatening them to be evicted from the forest reserve, abuse of office and exorting money from them. But the DISO denied the claims of extortion.

== Threats ==
Grazing of large herds of livestock during the dry season in the forest reserves, commercial forest farming, fires.

== See also ==
- Bujawe Central Forest Reserve
- Guramwa Central Forest Reserve
- Kalinzu Central Forest Reserve
- Kasagala Central Forest Reserve
- List of Central Forest Reserves of Uganda
