= Nyakarongo Central Forest Reserve =

Forest reserve in Uganda

- Nyakarongo forest
- IUCN category III (natural monument or feature)
- Location: Western region, Kibaale District, Western Region, Uganda
- Nearest city: Kibaale district
- Area: 3,535 ha (8,740 acres)
- Governing body: National Forestry Authority

Nyakarongo Central Forest Reserve is a protected area located in Kibaale district, western Uganda approximately 215 kilometers from Kampala, the Capital City of Uganda. The forest reserve covers an area of 3,535 hectares.

== Setting and Structure ==
The forest reserve is located in Mugarama sub-county and Kangombe village. It is situated close to the villages Wantema, Bigaga and Katwetwe. It is located at latitude 0.8378° or 0° 50' 16" north and longitude 31.1548° or 31° 9' 17" east.

== Conservation status ==
Nyakarongo is a protected reserve area managed by the National Forestry Authority, a government agency responsible for enforcing protection of the ecosystem in all forest reserves and significantly minimizing encroachment and deforestation.

== Threats ==
Nyakarongo Forest Reserve, along with other forests in Kibaale district, was significantly depleted by new settlers and Banyoro in 1990s. The other forests included Kagombe, Kasaato, Nyakarongo, and Ruzaire.

In 2023, 34 persons were imprisoned in Kibaale district for destroying the Nyakarango protected forest. The forestry authority took action due to the worrisome rate of forest loss in Kibaale area. An estimated 1,000 Banyoro encroached on the district's five forest reserves, totaling approximately 5,000 hectares. The arrests were a significant step forward in the fight against deforestation in the Kibaale district.

== See also ==
- Mabira Forest
- Bugoma Forest
- Itwara Central Forest Reserve
- Budongo Forest
- Rwensambya Central Forest Reserve
- Matiri Central Forest Reserve
- List of Central Forest Reserves of Uganda
