= Nyabyeya Central Forest Reserve =

Forest in Uganda

- Nyabyeya Forest
- Location within Uganda
- Location: Masindi District, Western Region, Uganda
- Coordinates: 1°41′5″N 31°31′19″E
- Area: 358.06 ha (884.8 acres)
- Governing body: National Forestry Authority (NFA)

Nyabyeya Central Forest Reserve is a forest reserve located in Masindi District, Western Uganda, Bujenje County, Budongo sub-county, and Nyabyeya parish in western Uganda. It is part of the extensive network of Central Forest Reserves managed by the National Forestry Authority (NFA) in Uganda. This forest reserve covers an area of about 358.06 hectares. Nyabyeya Forest Reserve was created to train students in forestry under the Nyabyeya Forestry College.

== Location and Geography ==
Nyabyeya Central Forest Reserve borders the Budongo Tropical Rain forest. It is located about 500 meters away from the bigger Budongo Central Forest Reserve. Masindi District, which is in northwest Uganda, is where the reserve is situated. Nyabyeya Central Forest Reserve is about a 1.5-hour drive from Masindi, the closest market town. The forest reserve is located between latitudes 1^{0} 40^{1} and 1^{0} 42^{1} and longitudes 31^{0} 32^{1} and 31^{0} 33^{1} and is surrounded by a network of roads that serve as fire breaks and compartment boundaries.

== Flora and Fauna ==
The forest within Nyabyeya Central Forest Reserve consists of diverse vegetation types, including moist semi-deciduous forests and forest plantations predominantly composed of pine and eucalyptus species. The reserve is home to a variety of plant and animal species, contributing to the rich biodiversity of the region.

== Management and Conservation ==
The National Forestry Authority (NFA) in Uganda oversees the management of Nyabyeya Central Forest Reserve as a component of the Central Forest Reserve system. All 506 of Uganda's Central Forest Reserves, which together comprise around 12,657.47 square kilometers and make up 6.3% of the country's total land area, are managed by the NFA.

The NFA's main goal is to safeguard and conserve the natural forest resources that are present in these reserves. Timber harvesting, re-planting, and other lawful activities may be included in management activities with the goal of preserving the ecological balance and using forest resources sustainably.

Nyabyeya Central Forest Reserve was gazetted in 1998 under the Forest Reserves (Declaration) Order, serial number MS/15. The forest spans 358.59 hectares and is separated into six compartments. Other forest estate lands total 67.01 hectares, including natural belts. In 2020, Wildlife Conservation Society began restoration of forest cover and boundary marking of several Central Forest Reserves, including for Nyabyeya forest reserve. Alongside Nyabyeya forest reserve, restoration efforts also focused on two other Central Forest Reserves including Rwensama and Itwara.

== Threats ==
The forest reserve is threatened by human activities which including the land giveaway to Makerere University in August 2018. Nyabyeya Forestry College gave away 10 hectares of land to the university's College of Agricultural and Environmental Sciences. The forest has also lost revenue where Makerere University was not paying ground rent for a students' hostel. Forest fires have also affected parts of the forest reserve because the predominant vegetation is characterized with elephant grass, and woody vegetation which pose a high risk for forest fires. Nyabyeya forest reserve also has high incidence of pests and diseases such as termites, leptocybe invasa and pine wilt targeting eucalyptus and pine compartments respectively.

== See also ==
- Mabira Forest
- Budongo forest
- Bugoma Forest
- Kalinzu Central Forest Reserve
- Itwara Central Forest Reserve
- Rwensambya Central Forest Reserve
- Guramwa Central Forest Reserve
- Bujawe Central Forest Reserve
- List of central forest reserves in Uganda
- List of Protected Areas of Uganda
