= Rushaya Central Forest Reserve =

Protected high forest in Uganda

Rushaya Central Forest Reserve is a protected high forest located in Rukungiri District in western Uganda. It covers an area of 31 hectares. It was designated a forest reserve in 1998. It is World Database on Protected Areas (WDPA) ID is 40369.

== Setting and geography ==
It is one of the forests that are in the Ugandan Albertine Rift. The forest is used to provide fuel for the tobacco industries and poles to use in construction. It is located at coordinates: 0.5983°S 29.8273°E .

== Threats ==
Cash crop farming such as tobacco, charcoal burners, poaching, deforestation, encroachment.

== See also ==
1. Rwensama Central Forest Reserve
2. National Forestry Authority
3. Nyabyeya Central Forest Reserve
4. Bujawe Central Forest Reserve
5. Guramwa Central Forest Reserve
