= Mafuga Central Forest Reserve =

Protected area in Western Uganda

- Mafuga Forest
- Location within Uganda
- Location: Rubanda, Rukungiri, Western Region, Uganda
- Coordinates: 01°03′00″S 29°52′00″E
- Area: 3,699 ha (9,140 acres)
- Established: 1932

Mafuga Central Forest Reserve is a protected area nestled within the landscapes of Rubanda district and Rukungiri district in Western Uganda. This forest reserve, managed by the National Forestry Authority (NFA), is renowned for its biodiversity, stunning mountain scenery, and ecological features. As a key component of Uganda's Central Forest Reserves system, Mafuga Central Forest Reserve plays a crucial role in conservation efforts and serves as a haven for numerous plant and animal species.

== Location and geography ==
The Mafuga Central Forest Reserve is located in the districts of Kabale and Rukungiri in the southwest of Uganda and covers 3,699 hectares (9,140 acres). The reserve includes a variety of geography, including undulating hills, deep valleys, and lush forested areas, and it spans an area between 1,200 and 2,800 meters above sea level. The approximate coordinates of the reserve are 0.4574697806304446, 33.01142117301238.

== Setting and structure ==
=== Flora and fauna ===
Mafuga Central Forest Reserve boasts a remarkable array of plant and animal species, making it an invaluable treasure trove of biodiversity. The forest is classified as a moist semi-deciduous medium-altitude forest, characterized by its distinct tree species and lush vegetation. The towering canopy is dominated by trees, with giant mahoganies and other species reaching heights of up to 60 meters.

The forest is home to an array of wildlife, including mammals, birds, reptiles, and amphibians. Several endangered and endemic species find sanctuary within the reserve, contributing to its conservation significance. The avian inhabitants of Mafuga Central Forest Reserve are particularly noteworthy, with a diverse range of bird species, including rare and regionally significant species.

=== Mountains ===
Within the boundaries of Mafuga Central Forest Reserve, there are two prominent mountains, the highest of which is Bihangire, reaching an elevation of 2,324 meters above sea level. The other named mountain in the reserve is Mafuga, with an elevation of 2,324 meters above sea level.

== Importance and conservation ==
Mafuga Central Forest Reserve holds immense ecological, environmental, and socio-economic importance. It provides essential ecosystem services such as water regulation, carbon sequestration, and soil stabilization, contributing to the overall well-being of the surrounding communities and the region at large. The reserve also plays a vital role in supporting research and education initiatives, furthering our understanding of forest ecology and conservation strategies. To safeguard the fragile ecosystems within Mafuga Central Forest Reserve, the National Forestry Authority (NFA) actively manages and protects the area. NFA's efforts include implementing sustainable forestry practices, combating illegal logging and encroachment, and promoting community engagement and participation in conservation activities.

== See also ==
- Mabira Forest
- Bugoma Forest
- Itwara Central Forest Reserve
- Budongo Forest
- Rwensambya Central Forest Reserve
- List of Central Forest Reserves of Uganda
- Mpanga central Forest reserve
