= Namatale Central Forest Reserve =

Forest in Mbale District, Uganda

- Namatale forest
- IUCN category III (natural monument or feature)
- Location: Mbale District, Eastern Region, Uganda
- Nearest city: Mbale district
- Governing body: National Forestry Authority

Namatale Central Forest Reserve is a forest located in Mbale district, Uganda. It is a significant natural resource that plays a crucial role in the region's ecosystem and biodiversity conservation efforts.

== Encroachment Challenges and Conservation Efforts ==
Namatale Central Forest Reserve has faced challenges in recent years due to encroachment by individuals and businesses seeking to exploit its resources for various purposes.

The National Forestry Authority (NFA) has been actively involved in addressing the issue of encroachment and implementing measures to protect and restore the forest reserve. Collaborative efforts with local communities, organizations, and stakeholders have been initiated to promote sustainable land use practices and raise awareness about the importance of forest conservation . Organizations such as Rotoract NFA Acres have partnered with NFA in reforestation initiatives, aiming to replant trees and restore degraded areas within Namatale Central Forest Reserve.

== Biodiversity and Conservation Importance ==
Namatale Central Forest Reserve is renowned for its diverse ecosystem and serves as an important habitat for numerous plant and animal species. The forest's rich biodiversity includes a variety of tree species, providing essential ecological services such as carbon sequestration, soil erosion prevention, and water regulation. These services contribute to the overall health and well-being of the surrounding communities and ecosystems.

== Boundary Marking and Management ==
To enhance the protection and management of Namatale Central Forest Reserve, efforts have been made to clearly demarcate its boundaries aiming to establish a clear distinction between the reserve and surrounding land areas. This boundary demarcation helps prevent encroachment and illegal activities within the forest reserve, ensuring its long-term conservation.

== Afforestation and Reforestation Initiatives ==
Recognizing the importance of restoring and expanding forest cover in Uganda, initiatives such as Uganda Baati's partnership with NFA have been undertaken to promote afforestation and reforestation efforts. These initiatives aim to replant trees within Namatale Central Forest Reserve. By restoring degraded areas and planting new trees, these projects help mitigate the impacts of deforestation and contribute to climate change mitigation efforts.

== See also ==
1. Matiri Central Forest Reserve
2. Mpanga Central Forest Reserve
3. List of Central Forest Reserves of Uganda
4. Mabira Forest
5. North Rwenzori Central Forest Reserve
