= Mubuku Central Forest Reserve =

Coordinates: 0.290°N 30.133°E

Mubuku Central Forest Reserve is a forest located in the Rwenzori Mountains region of Western Uganda, situated near the villages of Nyakalengija and Kilembe. The forest reserve covers a significant area and plays a vital role in the conservation of biodiversity and ecosystem services in the region.

== Location and geography ==
Mubuku Central Forest Reserve is situated in the Rwenzori Mountains, spanning parts of Kasese and Bundibugyo districts in Western Uganda. The forest reserve is characterized by its diverse topography, ranging from lush valleys to steep slopes, and is known for its rich biodiversity and unique ecosystems.

== Conservation efforts and restoration ==
Mubuku Central Forest Reserve has been subject to various conservation efforts aimed at preserving its ecological value. In recent years, the National Forest Authority (NFA) and other organizations have taken significant steps to restore and protect the forest reserve.

In collaboration with Uganda Baati, the NFA has initiated a project to restore Mubuku Central Forest Reserve. As part of this initiative, 10 hectares of trees have been replanted in the forest reserve. The project aims to rehabilitate degraded areas, enhance forest cover, and promote sustainable land use practices.

== Biodiversity and ecosystems ==
Mubuku Central Forest Reserve is renowned for its diverse flora and fauna. The forest is home to numerous plant species, including indigenous trees, shrubs, and medicinal plants. It provides habitat for a variety of wildlife, including primates, birds, reptiles, and amphibians.

The forest reserve also plays a crucial role in regulating local climate patterns, preserving water sources, and mitigating soil erosion. Its intact ecosystems contribute to the overall ecological balance of the Rwenzori Mountains region.

== Partnership and community involvement ==
To ensure the long-term conservation and sustainable management of Mubuku Central Forest Reserve, collaboration between the NFA, local communities, and other stakeholders is essential. The NFA has actively engaged with communities living adjacent to the forest reserve, promoting awareness about the importance of forest conservation and sustainable resource use.

Additionally, partnerships with organizations have played a vital role in supporting conservation efforts. Through such collaborations, the NFA aims to create opportunities for local communities to participate in eco-tourism, sustainable livelihood initiatives, and environmental education programs.

== See also ==
1. Nyabiku Central Forest Reserve
2. List of Central Forest Reserves of Uganda
3. List of protected areas of Uganda
4. Kalinzu Central Forest Reserve
