= Kasenyi Central Forest Reserve =

Forest reserve in Uganda

- Kasenyi forest
- IUCN category III (natural monument or feature)
- Interactive map of Kasenyi Central Forest Reserve
- Location: South Western region, Mubende district, Western Region, Uganda
- Nearest city: Mubende district
- Area: 199 ha (490 acres)
- Governing body: National Forestry Authority

Kasenyi Central Forest Reserve is a protected high forest located in Buwekula county in Mubende District in Central Region of Uganda. It was designated a forest reserve in 1968 and it covers an area of 1.99 km^{2} (199 hectares). Its World Database on Protected Areas (WDPA) ID is 40141. It is under the management of National Forestry Authority.

== Geography and location ==
It is located in Mubende District at coordinates: 0.5572°N 31.4165°E. Kasenyi Central Forest Reserve (CFR) lies within the Muzizi range together with other CFRs which include: Kaweri CFR, North Rwenzori CFR, Matiri CFR and Kasana - Kasambya CFR.

== Biodiversity ==
The forest types of trees that produce both hard and soft wood.

== Conservation status ==
In 2009, 34 hecatres of the reserve were deforested.

In 2014, the National Forestry Authority received 2 billion Ugandan shillings that was meant for demacating the boundaries for all the central forest reserves which included Kasenyi CFR.

In 2014, over 10 hectares for kasenyi CFR were restored through encroatchment planting.

== Threats ==
Timber trading, Charcoal burning and trade, Encroachment

== See also ==
1. Albertine Rift montane forests
2. Nyabyeya Central Forest Reserve
3. South Imaramagambo Central Forest Reserve
4. List of Central Forest Reserves of Uganda
