= Rwengiri Central Forest Reserve =

Protected tropical forest in Uganda

Rwengiri Central Forest Reserve is a protected tropical forest that is located in Rukungiri district in Western Uganda. It covers an area of 155 km^{2}. It managed by the National Forestry Authority. Its WPDA ID is 40357. It was designated a reserve in 1968.

== Setting and structure ==
it is located at : 0.6656°S 29.8702°E. The forest helps in reducing flooding by protecting the banks of river Kachindo Wetlands. The forest is commonly used for local fuel, charcoal and forestry investment.

== Conservation status ==
The size of forest reserve was impacted by the road Ugrade of Rukungiri–Kihihi– Ishasha/ Kanungu Road to Bituminous Standards in 2013. From 1996 to 2002, 25 km^{2} was deforested

== Threats ==
Cash crop farming for example Tobacco, illegal lumbering, poaching, deforestation, and encroachment.

== See also ==
- Bujawe Central Forest Reserve
- Kashoya-Kitomi Forest Reserve
- National Forestry Authority
- List of Central Forest Reserves of Uganda
