= Kangombe Central Forest Reserve =

Kangombe Central Forest Reserve is a forest reserve located in Kibaale District, Uganda. The reserve is known for its rich biodiversity and ecological significance. It serves as a habitat for numerous plant and animal species.

== History ==
Over the years, Kangombe Central Forest Reserve has faced various challenges, including encroachment and illegal activities. Efforts have been made to restore and protect the forest reserve through collaboration between the National Forestry Authority (NFA) and the local community.

== Conservation Efforts ==
Conservation initiatives have been implemented to address the threats facing Kangombe Central Forest Reserve and promote sustainable forest management practices. These efforts include raising awareness about the importance of conservation and engaging the local community in conservation activities.

== Challenges ==
Kangombe Central Forest Reserve faces challenges due to persistent encroachment and illegal activities. Activities such as logging, farming, and charcoal production pose significant threats to the forest ecosystem. Encroachers engage in these activities for their livelihoods, highlighting the need for alternative sustainable livelihood options and community engagement programs.

== Community Involvement ==
Recognizing the importance of community participation in conservation, the NFA has collaborated with local communities to raise awareness and promote sustainable practices. Community involvement programs aim to empower local residents, provide alternative livelihood options, and foster a sense of ownership and responsibility for the forest reserve.

== See also ==
1. List of Central Forest Reserves of Uganda
2. Nyabiku Central Forest Reserve
3. Nyabyeya Central Forest Reserve
4. Nyamakere Central Forest Reserve
