= Rwengeye Central Forest Reserve =

Forest in Uganda

Rwengeye Central Forest Reserve is a protected tropical high forest in the Kiryanga and Pacwa subcounties in Kibaale District in Western Uganda. It covers an area of 329 hectares (810 acres). It is operated by the National Forestry Authority (NFA). Its WDPA ID is 39999. It was declared a forest reserve in 1932 (93 years ago).

== Setting and structure ==
The forest protects the banks of River Pachwa and it is part of the biodiversity corridor connecting Murchison Falls. The forest is mainly used for ecological and environmental purposes.

It is located at these coordinates: 1.1032°N 31.0069°E

== Wildlife ==
This forest is home for primates including mangabeys, red-tailed and black and white colobus monkeys, and chimpanzees and birds.

== Conservation status ==
NFA signed an agreement to let some community based organisations carry out beekeeping within the forest reserves; for example Pachwa Linda Ebyobuhangwa Association (PLEA) and Kikonda Tulinde Ebyobuhangwa Association (KTEA) were allowed to start their operations in the Rwengeye Central Forest Reserve in June 2012.

A project that used a payment scheme to create incentives for the local communities was used so that they would be able to conserve and restore habitats for chimpanzees.

In 2015, the National forestry authority ordered the encroachers, who had cleared some forest and created a trading centre, to vacate the forest land but they refused.

In 2021, Umoja Conservation Trust organised Albertine Conservation Week in the Albertine districts such as Kibaale District where Bunyoro farmers were urged to plant more trees through educating them about the dangers of environmental destruction.

== Threats ==
Encroachment, illegal lumbering, charcoal burning, cash crop farming such rice and tobacco, substantial in-migration.

== See also ==
1. Albertine Rift montane forests
2. Bwamba Forest
3. Kashoya-Kitomi Forest Reserve
4. List of Central Forest Reserves of Uganda
