= Kitechura Central Forest Reserve =

Forest reserve in Uganda

Kitechura Central Forest Reserve is a forest reserve located in Western Uganda. It is situated near the villages of Hahanama and Kitega in Kyenjojo and it covers an area of approximately 5,330 hectares. The forest reserve is surrounded by the districts of Kibaale, Kyenjojo, and Kyegegwa. It lies along these co-ordinates 0◦34′ −0◦54′N and 30◦32′ −30◦58′E and between this altitude (1189−1372)masl.

== Overview ==
Kitechura Central Forest Reserve is an important natural resource in Western Uganda, known for its rich biodiversity and ecological significance. The forest reserve serves as a habitat for numerous plant and animal species and plays a crucial role in maintaining the regional ecosystem.

== Threats and conservation ==
Unfortunately, a section of Kitechura Central Forest Reserve has been subject to encroachment and illegal activities. Residents have cleared a portion of the forest to cultivate marijuana, leading to deforestation and habitat destruction. The marijuana gardens are estimated to cover an area of twenty hectares within the forest reserve.

To combat the threats to Kitechura Central Forest Reserve, various stakeholders, including government agencies, civil society organizations, and local communities, are working together. Their collaborative efforts focus on raising awareness, enforcing forest protection laws, and promoting sustainable land use practices.

== See also ==
- List of Forest Reserves in Uganda
- Kasagala Central Forest Reserve
- Mabira Forest
- Wambabya Central Forest Reserve
