= Gulu Central Forest Reserve =

Forest reserve in Uganda

Gulu Central Forest Reserve is a Forest Reserve located in Gulu District, Laroo-Pece division, Gulu City and is a protected area by National Forestry Authority. Despite numerous threats, the forest reserve has faced numerous challenges.

== Conservation ==
In March 2019, the government ordered eviction of encroachers into Gulu Central Forest Reserve following efforts to help restore and save the reserve from deforestation. In 2021, parliament of Uganda passed a resolution to degazette Gulu Central Forest Reserve.

== Controversies ==
The forest reserve has faced multiple encroachment to a brink nearing extinction. With many wrangles politically and locally by community members, the forest reserve has been highly contested by the current Gulu University, a higher institution of learning that is seated on vast chunks of land belonging to the forest. National Forestry Authority was faulted for wrongly participating in the give away of land belonging to Gulu Central Forest Reserve and to compensate for the illegality, the government agency agreed to relocate part of the forest reserve to Nwoya District and arranged 500 hectares of land to replant the forest reserve and pave way for the expansion of Gulu University.

== See also ==
- Mabira Forest
- Ihimbo Central Forest Reserve
- Bujawe Central Forest Reserve
