= Kapchorwa Central Forest Reserve =

Forest in Eastern Uganda

- Location within Uganda
- Location: Eastern Region, Uganda
- Coordinates: 1°15′0″N 34°30′0″E
- Area: .06 km^{2} (0.023 sq mi)
- Designation: Forest Reserve
- Designated: 1948

Kapchorwa Central Forest Reserve is a forest reserve located in Kapchorwa district found in the eastern part of Uganda (Sebei Sub-region) at the slopes of Mount Elgon. It is bordered by Mbale, Bulambuli, and Sironko in the south-west, Nakapiripit and Moroto in the north, and the republic of Kenya in the east. The area largely comprises the sabiny, pokot and the nandi communities of western Kenya. The 0.06 square kilometer (0.023 sq mi) forest reserve is located at an Altitude of 2,100 to 2,400 meters (6,900 to 7,900 ft) above sea level.

== Conservation status ==
National Forestry Authority is mandated to manage all forest reserves and protected areas in Uganda. In 2010, Kapchorwa Central Forest Reserve had 61.4kha of tree cover which also extended over 35% of its land area. However, in 2021, the reserve lost 15.6ha of tree cover, an equivalent of 15.4kt of CO_{2} emissions. World bank in partnership with the Ugandan government launched a US$178.2M (642bn in Uganda shillings) to conserve all protected areas and improve sustainable management of forests in Uganda. The reserve is home to a variety of plant and animal species, including mahogany trees, bamboo, and a variety of birds and mammals. The reserve is also a popular destination for hiking and camping. Kapchorwa Central Forest Reserve is an important part of the natural environment of Kapchorwa district. The reserve plays a role in regulating the climate, providing a habitat for wildlife, and protecting water resources. The NFA is working to conserve the reserve by preventing deforestation, controlling agricultural expansion, and educating the public about the importance of the reserve as stipulated in the National Forestry and Tree Planting Act, 2003.

== Setting and structure ==
The reserve was established in 1935 to protect the natural resources of the area. The reserve is managed by the National Forestry Authority (NFA). The NFA is responsible for the protection, conservation, and sustainable management of the reserve.

The reserve is open to the public for recreation and education. Visitors to the reserve are required to pay a fee and obtain a permit from the NFA. The NFA offers a variety of educational programs about the reserve and its natural resources.

It was established by the British colonial government to protect the natural resources of the area, which were threatened by deforestation and agricultural expansion. The reserve was also intended to provide a source of timber for the local community. Kapchorwa Central Forest Reserve is a popular destination for hiking and camping. The reserve is home to a number of hiking trails, which offer stunning views of the surrounding mountains. The reserve is also home to a number of campsites, which provide a place to relax and enjoy the natural beauty of the area.

Kapchorwa Central Forest Reserve is home to a variety of plant and animal species. The reserve is dominated by mahogany trees, which are used for timber. Other common trees in the reserve include bamboo, fig trees, and olive trees. The reserve is also home to a variety of birds, including hornbills, eagles, and sunbirds. Mammals found in the reserve include monkeys, elephants, and leopards.

== Controversies ==
The forest reserve is usually faced with increasing degradation due to high human activities such as encroachment for agriculture and illegal tree felling. The colonial government of Uganda in 1983 with the effort to conserve the reserve initiated a resettlement plan for the residents within the forest reserve and these affected inhabitants in Elgon forest reserve and greater parts of Kapchorwa.

The government then earmarked 6000 hectares of land for resettlement of affected persons in the Sebei sub region in Kapchorwa. To its dismay, this issues have not clearly been settled despite several efforts to degazette the over allocated portion of land exceeding the 6000 hectares by 2500 hectares which was illegally done.

Awaiting a pending solution, office of the Prime Minister in 2011 set up a committee comprised the National Environment Management Authority (NEMA), the National Forest Authority (NFA), Uganda Wildlife Authority (UWA), Ministry of Water and Environment (MWE) and Ministry of Tourism, Wildlife and Antiquities to handle this critical land question.

To date, the government is carrying out a phased resettlement with packages to sustain affected families despite continuous conservation efforts to save the remaining portion of the forest reserve.

== See also ==
- Ihimbo Central Forest Reserve
- Mabira Forest
- Kikumiro Central Forest Reserve
