= Kasato Central Forest Reserve =

Protected forest in Uganda

Kasato Central Forest Reserve is a protected tropical forest that is located in Kiryanga subcounty in Kagadi District in Western Uganda. It covers an area of 26.82 km^{2}(2691 hectares). It managed by the National Forestry Authority. It was designated a reserve in 1965. Its WPDA ID is 39988.

== Geography and structure ==
Kasato Central Forest Reserve is located at coordinates: 1.124°N 31.0834°E in Western Uganda. It acts as water catchment area for River Ruzaire. Kasato is used for both Ecological and Environmental purposes. Kasato provides a corridor linkage between other larger forests from Semuliki Wildlife Reserve to Kagombe Forest Reserve, up to Bugoma Forest Reserve and through riverine forest to Budongo Forest Reserve.

Kasato CFR contains 316 hectares of bush, 217 ha of grasslands, and 115 ha of small scale farmland.

== Biodiversity ==
Kasato CFR is a home to the endangered Olea welwitschii and Prunus africana tree species, and animals such as chimpanzees.

== Threats ==
Encroachment for agriculture land, forest give aways by politicians, hunting for bush meat, illegal lumbering, charcoal burning, mining. Immigrants from neighbouring countries such as Rwanda who clear the forests for settlement.

== Conservation status and challenges ==
National Forestry Authority was accused of not considering them in the giving away of the 15 gazatted central forest reserves in greater Kibaale district to private developers in response to the advert that was published in July 2017 that sought of hiring forest reserves in Kakumiro, Kibaale and Kagadi districts on a 49-year lease basis.

== See also ==
- North Rwenzori Central Forest Reserve
- Nyabiku Central Forest Reserve
- National Forestry Authority
- List of Central Forest Reserves of Uganda
- List of Local Forest Reserves of Uganda
