= Bugamba Central Forest Reserve =

Forest in Uganda

- Bugamba forest
- IUCN category III (natural monument or feature)
- Location within Uganda
- Location: Rwampara district, Western Region, Uganda
- Nearest city: Hoima
- Coordinates: 0°43′57″S 30°30′58″E
- Area: 1,210 ha (3,000 acres)
- Governing body: National Forestry Authority

Bugamba Central Forest reserve is a natural forest located in the Rwampara district, in southwestern Uganda. It has been referred to as an intensive soil conservation zone. The Reserve is one of the few softwood plantations where spacing is practiced. It is managed and is maintained on behalf of the Government of Uganda by the National Forestry Authority (NFA) under the National Forestry Authority and Tree Planting Act 8/2003.

== Setting and structure ==
Bugamba Central Forest Reserve encompasses the ridges and gullies running from the Karamurani Ridges to the Rubingo Valley. The Reserve covers a large amount of high ground and numerous valleys, including the majority of the Kyezo valley's western watershed. It is situated approximately 27 kilometres (17 mi), by road, southwest of Mbarara, the nearest large city The forest reserve is in a low rainfall zone with annual rainfall at 978 mm and 105 rainy days. However because to its high altitude, evaporation is minimal, which guarantees that soil moisture is available for an extended period of time. Bugamba CFR's current plantation area consists of 13 divisions encompassing approximately 1,210 hectares. There are 960 acres of plantable land while existing fire lines and roadways cover an area of 80.9 acres and 25 kilometers, respectively.

== Key biodiversity ==
Bugamba Forest Reserve is key to protecting rare biodiversity in Uganda. Examples of protected biodiversity include conkerberry, caribbean pine, Newtonia, Maesopsis, and the tree species Entandropragma, Albizzia and Markhamia which only occur in the valleys. The planting of conifer species started in 1965 in Bugamba forest reserve, with eucalyptus grandis used in fire lines.

== Threats and interventions ==
The cypress aphid ravaged cypress trees and hedgerows in Uganda in the 1990s, causing significant damage and crop loss. In the South Western region, the aphid attack severely impacted the softwood plantations including Bugamba forest reserve. Illegal logging has also been an issue in the reserves, resulting in forest cover degradation. A large number of the trees in Bugamba Forest Reserve have already been cut down, with approximately 1,080 hectares of the total area of 1,210 hectares having been cleared. However, replanting efforts have been successful, with approximately 80 hectares of trees remaining in the reserve. In addition to the caribbean pine species, the National Forestry Authority (NFA) has imported new species from Honduras and South Africa.

== See also ==
- List of Central Forest Reserves of Uganda
