= Nyamakere Central Forest Reserve =

Forest in Uganda

- Nyamakere Forest
- Location within Uganda
- Location: Kiryandongo District, Western Region, Uganda
- Coordinates: 2°0′30″N 32°14′38″E

Nyamakere Central Forest Reserve is a protected area located in the Kiryandongo District of Uganda. It is one of the many Central Forest Reserves managed by the National Forestry Authority (NFA) of Uganda. Nyamakere Central Forest Reserve covers an extensive stretch of over 3.4 kilometers.

== Location and description ==
Nyamakere Central Forest Reserve is situated within the Kiryandongo District, which is located in the western part of Uganda. The reserve boasts diverse vegetation, including forested areas and other natural habitats. It is an essential area for conserving biodiversity and preserving the ecological balance of the region.

== Conservation and Biodiversity ==
Nyamakere Central Forest Reserve plays a role in preserving the rich biodiversity. A variety of rare and indigenous plant and animal species can be found there. Conservation efforts aim to preserve the habitats of different plants and animals by safeguarding this forest reserve, improving the general ecological health of the area.

== Threats and Conservation Efforts ==
Nyamakere Central Forest Reserve is threatened by criminal activity and human encroachment, like many other forest reserves. The integrity of the reserve is threatened by encroachment, including deforestation, agriculture, and settlements. The Bunyoro Kingdom has also been accused of the demolition of the reserve. The NFA and other conservation groups are actively involved in putting these precautions into place in order to counter these dangers and guard the forest against future deterioration . To support sustainable practices and alternative livelihoods that are consistent with the objectives of forest conservation, efforts include increasing awareness, going on patrols, and interacting with the neighborhood communities.

== Importance to Local Communities ==
For the nearby people, Nyamakere Central Forest Reserve is important both culturally and economically. The forest offers a range of ecosystem services, including the control of water flow, soil preservation, and the production of non-timber forest products. The livelihoods and wellbeing of the surrounding communities are influenced by these resources. The forest reserve also provides potential for ecotourism and educational pursuits, which can bring in money and raise environmental consciousness among both visitors and locals.

== Education and Research ==
The Nyamakere Central Forest Reserve is a crucial location for scientific study and instruction. Within the reserve, researchers and students can carry out biodiversity surveys, look into ecological processes, and study the reserve's different ecosystems. These investigations advance our knowledge of ecosystem functioning, species interactions, and forest dynamics. To further spread knowledge about the importance of forests, biodiversity preservation, and sustainable land use practices, educational programs might be created.

== See also ==
- Mabira Forest
- Budongo forest
- Kalinzu Central Forest Reserve
- Bujawe Central Forest Reserve
- List of central forest reserves in Uganda
