= Muhunga Central Forest Reserve =

Protected forest in Uganda

- Muhunga Forest
- Location within Uganda
- Location: Kibaale District, Western Region, Uganda
- Coordinates: 0.8909°N 31.1171°E
- Area: 4.12 km^{2} (1.59 sq mi)
- Established: 1965
- Governing body: National Forestry Authority (NFA)

Muhunga Central Forest Reserve is a protected tropical forest that is located in Kyebando sub-county in Kibaale District in Western Uganda. It covers an area of 4.12 km^{2} (1.59 sq mi). It is managed by the National Forestry Authority. It was designated a reserve in 1965. Its WPDA ID is 39992.

== Geography and structure ==
Muhunga CFR is located at coordinates: 0.8909°N 31.1171°E in Kibaale District in Western Uganda. It is used for both Ecological and Environmental purposes. It acts as a catchment area for River Muhunga that drains into MuziziRiver. River Muhunga is the water source for both Kibaale and Karuguuza piped water.

== Threats ==
Encroachment and illegal lumbering. Immigrants from neighbouring countries such as Rwanda who clear the forests for settlement.

== Conservation status and challenges ==
In 2019, a former Mwenge North Member of Parliament was arrested for owning two power saws and 255 pieces of timber in his house by the Uganda police of Kagadi District.

== See also ==
- National Forestry Authority
- List of Central Forest Reserves of Uganda
- List of Local Forest Reserves
- Kasato Central Forest Reserve
