= Ibamba Central Forest Reserve =

Protected forest reserve located in Hoima District in Uganda

Ibamba Central Forest Reserve is a protected forest reserve under the mandate of National Forestry Authority and is located in Hoima District, western Uganda. The Forest Reserve is situated nearby to the villages Kihuule and Kicwamba. Hoima is a city found in the Western part of Uganda and is the main municipal, administrative, and commercial center for Hoima District, also known as the Oil City.

== Setting and structure ==
Ibamba Central Forest Reserve is found at Latitude 1.42° or 1° 25' 12" North and Longitude

31.4051° or 31° 24' 18" east. The Forest Reserve is in close proximity to the villages Kiryabana and Buhanika.

== Language ==
Ibamba Central Forest Reserve communities largely speak the Nyoro language also known as Runyoro.

== Controversies ==
Ibamba Central Forest Reserve over the years has faced challenges ranging from Encroachment, felling of trees, charcoal burning, land for agriculture and sugarcane growing, including court orders resulting from illegal occupation of the Central Forest Reserve. In 2014, the High Court ordered Uganda Broadcasting Corporation (UBC) to pay National Forest Authority (NFA) $104,808 (about sh262m) in un-cleared license fees since 1950s for iligaly occupying Ibamba Central Forest Reserve land. NFA sued UBC for continuously occupying two of its plots of land in Kigulya Central Reserve in Masindi and Ibamba Hills in Hoima where the corporation erected masts without paying.

== See also ==
Ihimbo Central Forest Reserve

Mabira Forest

Kikumiro Central Forest Reserve
