= Rwoho Central Forest Reserve =

Forest in Uganda

Coordinates: 0.873°S 30.579°E

- Rwoho forest
- IUCN category III (natural monument or feature)
- Interactive map of Rwoho Central Forest Reserve
- Location: Ntungamo district, Isingiro district, Rwampara district, South Western Region, Uganda
- Nearest city: Ntungamo town
- Area: 91 square kilometers
- Governing body: National Forestry Authority

Rwoho Forest Reserve is a protected area located to the south of Bugamba Central Forest Reserve in Ntungamo, Rwampara and Isingiro districts in south western Uganda. The reserve covers extensive high ground and numerous valleys, including the majority of the Kyezo valley's western watershed. Rwoho Forest Reserve has an area of 91 square kilometers and is maintained on behalf of the Government of Uganda by the National Forestry Authority (NFA) under the National Forestry Author LL land Tree Planting Act 8/2003. This Forest Reserve have nearby villages including: Kirungu, Rwoho,kikunda,kagabagaba,kihanga and others.

== Setting and structure ==
Rwoho forest's plantation area consists of 12 compartments totaling approximately 1,580 acres. There are 1548 acres of plantable land. Existing fire lines and roadways cover 6.6 hectares and 19 km, respectively. The woodland is located in a region of the country with a moderate population density. As a result, the forest is under strain for firewood, construction poles, grazing, and other non-timber forest products. Rwoho forest reserve has 19 km of road, which corresponds to a road density of 0.3 km/ha. This is insufficient, and considering the size of the land, the road density should be at least 3% of the entire area. In addition, some of the road would serve as a fire line.

== Key biodiversity ==
Rwoho Forest Reserve is very important since it is home to species that cannot be found anywhere else in Uganda's protected regions. These include the following; Carrisa edulis, Pinus caribaea, Newtonia, Maesopsis, and Entandropragma and Albizzia Markhamia tree species, which occur in valleys. The planting of conifer species started in 1964 in Rwoho forest reserve and eucalyptus grandis was used in fire lines. The forest reserve is in a low rainfall zone - annual rainfall at 865 mm and falls on 74 rainy days. However, because to its high altitude, evaporation is quite minimal. This guarantees that soil moisture is available for an extended period of time.

== Threats and interventions ==
The reserve is threatened by human activities, including clearance for agriculture, grazing and firewood collection. Fire is the main threat to the productivity of the plantation and fire protection shall be given top priority in allocation of funds and personnel. As a result, United Nations Development Programme implemented the Rwoho Forest Community Conservation Project to alleviate some of the threats. The goal of the project was to encourage conservation of the forest through raising awareness, promoting new sources of wood, and developing alternative income opportunities such as beekeeping. The project also encouraged recovery of forest biodiversity through enrichment planting with indigenous tree species. Under the Rwoho Environmental Conservation and Protection Association and the Uganda Nile Basin Reforestation project in 2009 2,000 hectares of pine and mixed native species plantations were restored in the Rwoho Central Forest Reserve previously degraded due to deforestation and erosion. As a result, 29,795 t of CO_{2} equivalent offsets were created.

In 2007, the National Forest Authority began planting pine trees in Rwooho and Bugamba forest reserves. Aside from the Pinus caribea from the Caribbean, NFA was also planting new Pinus caribea species from Honduras and South Africa. Furthermore, interventions were undertaken to curtail illicit logging in Rwoho forest reserve.

== See also ==
- List of Central Forest Reserves of Uganda
