= Kashoya-Kitomi Central Forest Reserve =

Forest in Uganda

Kasyoha-Kitomi Central Forest Reserve
- Kashyoha-Kitomi Forest
- IUCN category III (natural monument or feature)
- Location within Uganda
- Location: Bushenyi, Ibanda and Kamwenge districts
- Nearest city: Bushenyi
- Coordinates: 0.266°S 30.241°E
- Area: 433 km^{2} (167 sq mi)
- Established: 1932
- Governing body: National Forestry Authority (NFA)

Kasyoha-Kitomi Central Forest Reserve is located in Western Uganda, and has an area of 433-square-kilometre (107,000-acre). It is located south of Lake George and the Kazinga channel in the Albertine Rift eco-region, which is known for its abundance of endemic species. The forest reserve lies within the counties of Bunyaruguru, Igara and Buhweju in the administrative districts of Bushenyi, Ibanda and Kamwenge It was officially gazetted in 1932 and is controlled by Uganda's National Forestry Authority (NFA).

== Setting and structure ==
Kasyoha-Kitomi is a moist medium-altitude forest with a high concentration of indigenous plants and animals. The elevation ranges from 972 to 2,136 meters above sea level. The majority of the forest reserve is located in the valleys of the western ranges. The annual rainfall is bimodal, ranging from 1250 mm to 1400 mm. The forest reserve, as a critical watershed, provides ecological benefits to Lake George. The forest reserve's western edge borders the Queen Elizabeth National Park and the Kyambula Game Reserve.

== Key Biodiversity ==
The number of bird species recorded from Kasyoha-Kitomi is 308, with over 276 species reported from this forest reserve with the White-napped Pigeon (Columbia albinucha) and Grey Parrot (Psittacus erithacus) considered globally near-threatened. Kasyoha-Kitomi is also home to one Albertine Rift endemic (the Blue-headed Sunbird), Afep Pigeon, Black Bee-eater, Blue-throated Brown Sunbird, Blue-throated Roller, Dusky Long-tailed Cuckoo, White-collared Olive-back, Cinnamon-breasted Bee-eater, Shelley's Greenbul, Equatorial Akalat, and Mountain Illadopsis are among the other species. The reserve is further home to a variety of wildlife species, including habituated chimpanzees, red-tailed monkeys, blue monkeys, black and white colobus monkeys, baboons, and vervet monkeys.

Kasyoha-Kitomi exhibit a diversity of wildlife, including one threatened species and one IUCN listed species of mammals. The mammals include among others, the elephant (L. africana), chimpanzee (P. troglodytes) and L’hoest's monkey (C. l’hoesti). The small mammals recorded in Kasyoha-Kitomi include three uncommon forest dependent shrews – Northern Swamp Musk Shrew, Eastern Musk Shrew and Hero Shrew.

== Threats ==
The forest reserve has been deforested in search of arable soil and fuel wood. Because the majority of the larger trees have been harvested for timber and fire wood, the reserve now contains short shrubs and reeds. Since the forest reserve, as a wildlife corridor connects Queen Elizabeth National Park and Kyambula Game Reserve, animal movements along this corridor frequently result in crop attacks on local people's crops. In turn, some communities around the forest reserve have taken advantage of the opportunity to illegally hunt down the animals for meat.

== See also ==
- Mabira Forest
- Bugoma Forest
- Itwara Central Forest Reserve
- Budongo Forest
- Rwensambya Central Forest Reserve
- List of Central Forest Reserves of Uganda
