= Musoma Central Forest Reserve =

Protected area in Masindi, Uganda

Coordinates: 1.536°N 31.557°E

Musoma Forest
- Musoma Central Forest Reserve
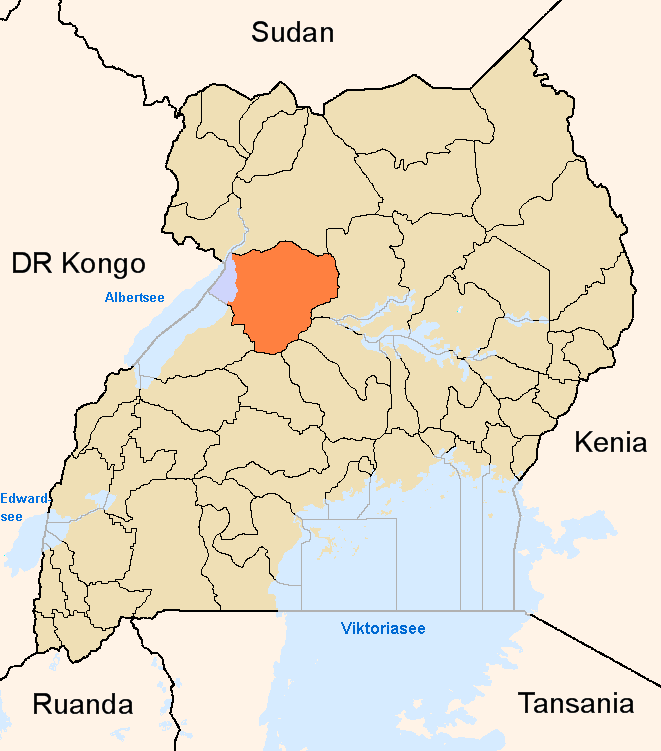
- Masindi District, Uganda
- Interactive map of Musoma Forest
- Location: Masindi District, Uganda
- Nearest city: Hoima
- Area: 200 km^{2} (77 sq mi)

Musoma Central Forest is located in Masindi, Uganda. The Forest Reserve showcases Uganda's landscape, wildlife, and culture.

== Geography ==
Musoma Central Forest Reserve is approximately 200 kilometers northwest of Uganda's capital, Kampala. It covers an area of around 86 square kilometers and it is situated within the Albertine Rift Valley. The forest reserve has a diverse range of ecosystems, including tropical rainforest, swampy areas, and savannah woodlands.

== Biodiversity and wildlife ==
Musoma Central Forest Reserve has a wide variety of plant and animal species. The forest's canopy is dominated by trees such as mahogany, ironwood, and shea tree.

== Cultural significance ==
Musoma Central Forest Reserve holds cultural significance for the local communities. The forest has been a vital source of livelihood and traditional practices for generations. Indigenous communities have relied on its resources for food, medicine, and building materials.

== Conservation efforts ==
The Ugandan government, in collaboration with local communities and environmental organizations, has implemented measures to safeguard the forest. Strict regulations on logging and poaching have been enforced, and community-based initiatives promote sustainable practices while providing alternative income-generating opportunities.

== Tourism ==
The forest reserve offers trails with ranger-led tours. Nature walks, birdwatching, and primate tracking are popular activities within the forest. Camping facilities and lodges are available.

== See also ==
- Central Forest Reserves of Uganda
