= Kasagala Central Forest Reserve =

Forest in Uganda

- Kasagala Forest
- Location within Uganda
- Location: Nakasongola District, Central Region, Uganda
- Coordinates: 1°19′N 32°14′E

Kasagala Central Forest Reserve is a protected area located in central Uganda. It was gazetted in 1963 and is known for its diverse ecosystem and significant contribution to the region's biodiversity conservation efforts. Kasagala Forest Reserve was established to provide ecosystem services and watershed protection to Lake Kyoga, an inland body of water that is slowly drying up owing to loss of surrounding plant cover.

== Location and geography ==
Kasagala Forest Reserve is located in Bululi county. The elevation ranges from 1067 to 1097m above sea level, with the highest peak (Kasagala Hill) reaching 1159m.

The southern limit is 94 kilometers and the northern line is 110 kilometers from Kampala. The reserve is located east of the Kampala-Gulu trunk road. This reserve is one of 59 in Uganda that are larger than 50 km2 and have a biodiversity plan. Kasagala Central Forest Reserve has an area of 10,298 acres. It covers an extensive land area and forms an integral part of the country's natural heritage. The reserve is bounded on the west by the main road north from Kampala, which is stopped by the NFA Katugo Plantation Forest. Several enclaves are located within the reserve's limits.

== Topography ==
The landscape is composed of relatively flat hill tops and flat broad valleys that are seasonal swamps that flood twice a year during the two rainy seasons. Kasagala Reserve is separated into five Class Zones based on soil qualities and geographical elements inside the forest reserve, as follows:

1. Zone 1 (499ha): This zone occurs on seasonally waterlogged bogs that cover a substantial section of the reserve. Every rainy season, or twice a year, the zone undergoes water logging. The amount of water relies on the amount of rain received, as well as its regularity and durability during the rainy season. The valleys' flatness and luxuriant growth of Loadetiaphragmitoides grass prevent fast flow of rain water, which stays longer after the rain has ended.
2. Zone 2: The zone found on both sides of the wetlands. It is 808ha in size, with most of the trees removed and replaced by a lot of grass that sustains cattle during the dry seasons.
3. Zone 3: (1682ha) occurs on the flanks of hills where the ground rises gently and has a 5% slope. Natural forest woodland can still be found on certain hills, particularly in the east and away from the major road. Around the hills, the zone is 400-500m broad.
4. Zone 4: This zone (92ha) is comparable to zones V above and III below, but it has been separated from the other two due to the presence of solid laterite rock outcrops and shallow stony soils with a high proportion of laterite and quartzite pebbles. It is a tiny area of around 20m round hills.
5. Zone 5: Hill top sites (3659ha), which eventually combine with forest and woodland sites on the hills' slopes, create a distinct and distinctive site type. The majority of the woodland that covered the zone has been gone, and grazing has also removed the grasses, leaving the soil barren and vulnerable to erosion. It encompasses the majority of the forest reserve.

== Ecology ==
There are many different types of flora including trees, bushes, and other vegetation in the reserve. According to studies, the forest supports a variety of plant species and is crucial to preserving the area's ecological balance.

The Kasagala Central Forest Reserve is home to a wide variety of fauna including mammal, bird, reptile, and insect species. The ecological importance and richness of the reserve are enhanced by the species that have evolved to the specific habitat conditions present there.

== Conservation and management ==
The Ugandan government has classified the Kasagala Central Forest Reserve as a Protected Area. Due to this classification, its natural resources and ecosystem integrity are protected legally and via conservation efforts. A thorough forest management plan has been put in place to direct sustainable use and conservation procedures inside the reserve. This plan describes many land use classifications, each fulfilling particular conservation and use goals, such as strict nature reserves, carbon sequestration zones, and producing regions.

For the reserve, an environmental impact assessment has been carried out to guarantee responsible management. This assessment aids in identifying potential environmental effects of human activity and directs decision-making for sustainable development inside and beyond the reserve. The reserve's distinctive ecology is home to a wide variety of plant and animal species, including numerous endangered and endemic ones. The preservation of Kasagala Central Forest Reserve supports regional and international efforts to conserve biodiversity.

There are several ecosystem services such as soil preservation, carbon sequestration, and flood control, are provided by the reserve in crucial amounts. Its preservation benefits the local community as well as the larger environment by assisting in the maintenance of the ecological balance. Kasagala Central Forest Reserve is a useful location for ecological research. The reserve's flora, fauna, and ecological processes are studied by scientists and researchers to improve their comprehension of ecosystems and advance the body of knowledge in the field of conservation biology.

Kasagala forest reserve was established in 1963 solely for the aim of developing plantations to produce saw timber to supply the ever-increasing need for industrial timber. NFA and other private planters' investments in tree planting will create jobs in the surrounding communities. The dominant vegetation type, savanna woodland, has provided raw material for charcoal production for many centuries, but the woodland is being harvested unsustainablely, and the time has come when charcoal production can no longer provide employment as it has for many decades. Another source of revenue-generating activity is desperately needed in this area.

== Threats and interventions ==
The forest has been severely damaged as a result of widespread grazing, settlement, and cultivation. Settlement near Namwanga, Mitanzi, Kalungu, and Kitaleba settlements has largely contributed to the forest's devastation. Cattle keeping settlements have been recorded in Kigogwe, Kalungu, Katugo, Kasaigala, Mayirye, Kyaluweza, Kiraka, Mitanzi, and Kyabasonga, primarily near marshes. Efforts are being made to involve the neighborhood in the maintenance and preservation of the Kasagala Central Forest Reserve. The long-term effectiveness of conservation activities, including chances for sustainable living and environmental education programs, depends on community support and involvement. Kasagala forest reserve is reported to be losing essential tree species and suffering from a lack of species diversity. This habitat has been severely impacted by forest degradation for charcoal and firewood. Continued and uncontrolled deforestation, particularly of tree species such as Combretum for firewood and charcoal, would change the composition and structure of the woodland forest, harming biodiversity and ecosystem processes. While various woodlands around Lake Kyoga were gazetted in the 1930s to safeguard the lake system's watershed, the Kasagala forest is critically threatened by the exploitation of its woodland resources for charcoal, firewood, and poles.

== See also ==
- Mabira Forest
- Budongo forest
- Kalinzu Central Forest Reserve
- Bujawe Central Forest Reserve
- List of central forest reserves in Uganda
