= Gangu Central Forest Reserve =

Forest reserve in Uganda

Coordinates: 0.149°N 32.202°E

- Gangu Forest
- Location: Butambala District
- Nearest city: Kampala
- Governing body: National Forestry Authority (NFA)

Gangu Central Forest Reserve is a 1,054 hectares protected area located along the Kampala Masaka highway in Butambala District, South West of Kampala City in Central Uganda.

== Conservation status ==
Gangu Central Forest Reserve is managed by the National Forestry Authority (NFA). In the financial year 2015/2016, National Forestry Authority restored a total of 100 hectares of the reserve land through encroachment planting. In 2016/17, a total of 200 hectares were planted in Gangu with support from Uganda Electricity Transmission Company Limited (UETCL) funding, while an additional 1500 hectares were restored through enrichment planting, funded by the World Bank via the Ministry of Water and Environment.

== Threats ==
The Gangu Central Forest Reserve in Uganda is confronting a pressing threat from encroachers engaging in deforestation and various human activities. A substantial portion of these encroachers exploit the reserve for agricultural cultivation, timber harvesting, and charcoal production, further exacerbating the environmental degradation.

== See also ==
- List of Central Forest Reserves in Uganda
