= Muhangi Central Forest Reserve =

Forest reserve in Uganda

- Muhangi forest
- IUCN category III (natural monument or feature)
- Location: Kyenjojo District.
- Nearest city: Kyenjojo town
- Area: 2,044 ha (5,050 acres)
- Governing body: National Forestry Authority (NFA)

Muhangi Central Forest Reserve is a protected area located in Western Uganda's Kyenjojo district. Muhangi forest is a closed tropical forest that protects the banks of river Muzizi. It spans an area of 2,044 hectares. It is also located in the Ugandan Albertine Rift, Muzizi River Catchment Area since the River Muzizi runs along the northern part of Muhangi Central Forest Reserve.

== Setting and structure ==
Muhangi forest is among the many forests in Uganda with unhabituated populations of chimpazees even though they are affected by bush meat hunting and forest encroachment from surrounding community members. Muhangi's initial boundary opening occurred in 1957, and a further boundary reopening in 1997 was carried out but was later abandoned due to rebel activity in the area. The forest harboured the Allied Democratic Forces - ADF rebels in the 1997 and 2006 incidences therefore has always been a sources of terror to communities surrounding it.

== Key biodiversity ==
Some common tree species in Muhangi Central Forest Reserve include: omuhimdi (Cynometra alexandrii); omusoko (Olea welwitschii); omunyamunuka (Celtis durandii); omuhabulya (Chrysophyllum albidum); omukora (Strombosia scheffleri); Celtis zenkeri; and omuhoko (Diospyros abyssinica). Muhangi is also well stocked with high-grade furniture timber species.

In Muhangi forest, there is also a significant demand for timber, building poles, fuel, and different non-timber forest resources such as medicinal herbs, honey, mushrooms, water, and pastures.

== Conservation status ==
Muhangi is a protected reserve managed by Uganda's National Forestry Authority, a government institution charged with enforcing ecosystem protection in all forest reserves and reducing encroachment and deforestation. In the Muzizi range, where Muhangi forest reserve is situated, 60 hectares of forest were planted with support from World Wide Conservation Nature. However, weeds have developed in some of the plantations as a result of irregular spot weddings and slashing caused by a lack of finances for those activities.

== Threats ==
The forest reserve has been encroached to plant food crops while others are engaging in charcoal burning. Also, the grasslands near to the settlements surrounding Muhangi forest are vulnerable to grazer encroachment and thus prone to bush fires, slowing the rate of regrowth. Muhangi Forest reserve lacks motorable roads, and certain areas are inaccessible due to a lack of connecting roads, particularly during the rainy season. A vehicle can only travel up to 3 kilometers from Muhangi Forest Reserve.

== See also ==
- List of central forest reserves of Uganda
- List of protected areas of Uganda
