= Kagombe Central Forest Reserve =

Forest in Uganda

- Kagombe forest
- IUCN category III (natural monument or feature)
- Location within Uganda
- Location: Western Region, Uganda
- Nearest city: Kagadi
- Coordinates: 0.842°N 30.796°E
- Area: 301 km^{2} (116 sq mi)
- Governing body: National Forestry Authority (NFA)

Kagombe Central Forest Reserve is a 301-square-kilometre (74,000-acre) forest reserve located in Western Uganda's district of Kagadi and Nyamarundu sub county. It is also located in Uganda's Albertine Rift ecoregion area renowned for its rich biodiversity.

== Conservation status ==
Kagombe forest reserve was designated in 1932 and is managed by Uganda's National Forestry Authority (NFA). It is home to different flora and fauna including chimpanzees. Other species in the forest include Elgon Olive, Preminor Angoles, Macamia platicalex, Ebony and Abezia. In 2019, NFA evicted encroachers from Kagombe Forest Reserve to support restoration of Uganda's forest cover and ensure conservation of protected areas. In 2022, the NFA in partnership with the World Wide Fund for Nature, Uganda launched a forest restoration drive for Kagombe and Bugoma forest reserves.

== Threats ==
The forest reserve is threatened by encroachment, charcoal burning, crop raiding, forest fires, illegal pitsawing and medicinal plant collection. Hunting of bush meat with dogs and nets in Kagombe Forest is prevalent since the forest is less intensively visited by staff. Chimpanzees in Kagombe are affected by indiscriminate effects of snaring using spears and bows. In the previous decade, agribusiness has devastated nearly three-quarters of Kagombe Central Forest Reserve. Since 2000, over 13000-hectares of Kagombe forest has been encroached on by locals in Kagadi district. Some local communities have joined together to counteract the effects of climate change through afforestation and patrolling.

== See also ==
- List of central forest reserves in Uganda
- List of Protected Areas of Uganda
