= Matiri Central Forest Reserve =

Forest in Uganda

- Matiri forest
- IUCN category III (natural monument or feature)
- Location: Tooro region, Kyenjonjo district, Western Region, Uganda
- Nearest city: Kyenjonjo district
- Area: 25 square kilometers
- Governing body: National Forestry Authority

Matiri Central Forest Reserve is a protected tropical forest reserve that is located in Kyenjojo district of western Uganda. The central forest covers an area of 64 square kilometres (25 sq mi) and is among the few surviving natural forest reserves in the Tooro region.

== Setting and structure ==
Matiri Central Forest Reserve is located in the Muzizi River Catchment and the Albertine rift region. It is part of the renowned elephant corridor which attracts hundreds of tourists each year. The estimated terrain elevation above sea level of Matiri forest reserve is 1020 meters. The latitude of the forest reserve is 3.21056, and the longitude is 32.97337 with the GPS coordinates of 03° 12′ 38.01″ N and 32° 58′ 24.13″ E.

== Conservation status ==
The forest reserve was gazetted in 1962 and reconfirmed in 1998 by the Forest Reserves Declaration order of 1998. In 2023, the Ugandan government partnered with the World Bank to mitigate forest cover loss in twenty-eight forest reserves including Matiri Central Forest Reserve.

== Threats ==
Matiri is surrounded by a high human population densityand activities like agriculture are increasing. Several hectares of forest cover have been cleared for human settlement, agriculture, timber and charcoal. Human activity has also threatened key species including the endangered Red Colobus (Procolobus rufomitratus tephrosceles). Matiri forest is still under threat from a private piece of mailo land known as Mukonomura enclave, which the government did not purchase when the forest was gazetted. The 518-hectare enclave is separated into two plots, with plot 193 belonging to Tooro kingdom and plot 194 belonging to Christine Knops Aliganyira but formerly registered in the name of Samwiri Rukoma. The land, which has multiple tenants, serves as a springboard for forest encroachment.

In 2014, the High Court in Fort Portal ordered more than 200 families to vacate Matiri Central Forest Reserve. In the same year, the government began evicting 434 residents from the Forest Reserve to construct a trading center on the Kyenjojo-Kampala highway. The Court further ordered a halt to all human activities such as farming and charcoal burning in the forest. Most of the encroachers live in the communities of Bwesese, Kyabanengo, Kidukuru, and Mukonomura.

== See also ==
- Mabira Forest
- Bugoma Forest
- Itwara Central Forest Reserve
- Budongo Forest
- Rwensambya Central Forest Reserve
- List of Central Forest Reserves of Uganda
