= Kitubulu Central Forest Reserve =

Protected area in Uganda

- Kitubulu forest
- IUCN category III (natural monument or feature)
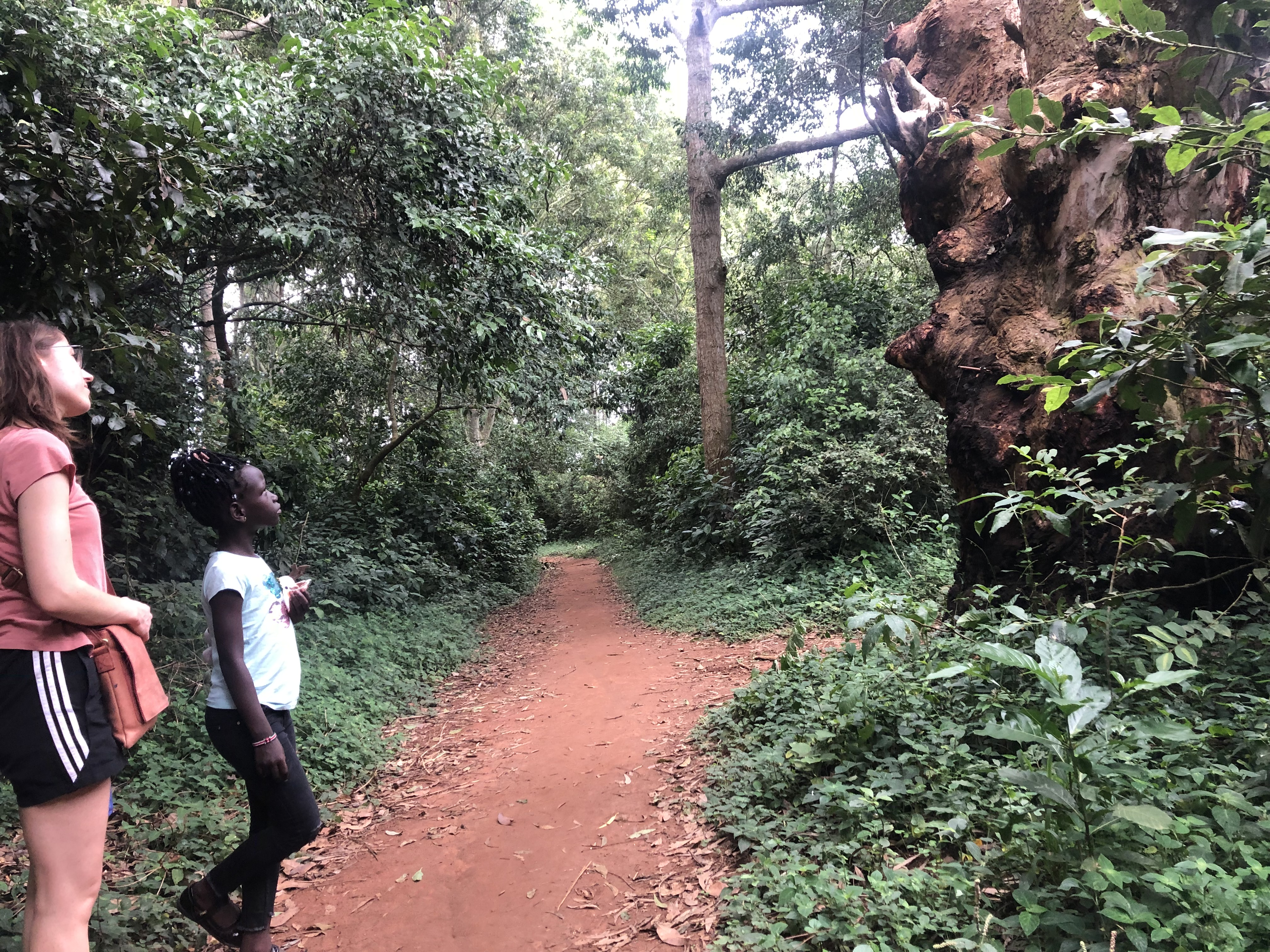
- Tourists in Kitubulu Central Forest Reserve in Entebbe, Central Uganda

- Location within Uganda
- Location: Central Region, Uganda
- Nearest city: Entebbe district
- Coordinates: 00°04′39″N 32°30′00″E
- Area: 80 ha (200 acres)
- Governing body: National Forestry Authority

Kitubulu Central Forest Reserve is a protected area located in Uganda, near the city of Entebbe in Central Uganda. Covering an area of 80 hectares, it is an important forest ecosystem that is home to a diverse range of flora and fauna. The reserve is categorized as a Category IV protected area by the International Union for Conservation of Nature (IUCN), indicating its significance for the preservation of biological diversity and the protection of ecosystems. The forest reserve is situated in Central Uganda and is protected by the National Forestry Authority under the National Forest and Tree Planting Act. The forest reserve was gazetted in 1932 to protect Lake Victoria and the environment.

== Settings and structure ==
The forest reserve lies on the northeast side of Entebbe Bay, south of Kampala City. Kitubulu forest reserve is a vital remnant of the lowland woods that surround Lake Victoria, filtering water pollutants and silt that endanger the basin. Preservation of the forest reserve is important for the conservation of biodiversity and ecosystems, and for the protection of the Lake Victoria basin. Kitubulu is an evergreen canopy rainforest with a dense evergreen canopy.

The commemorative tree planting at Kitubulu forest reserve in 2007 by delegates from the National Forestry Authority and the Queen of the United Kingdom during the Commonwealth meeting in Uganda highlights the importance of preserving forest ecosystems and the efforts being made to address the issue of deforestation. While initiatives such as sustainable land use practices and community forestry projects are being adopted, the issue of reconciling the requirements of an expanding population in Entebbe and Uganda with conservation efforts continues.

== Threats and interventions ==
Despite its designation as a forest reserve by the government, the Kitubulu Central Forest Reserve has faced alarming levels of environmental degradation due to human encroachment. Activities such as unmonitored farming, logging, and mining have had a detrimental impact on the ecosystem within the forest reserve. While the environmental degradation caused by human encroachment is a significant concern, there is ongoing work to restore and protect the Kitubulu Central Forest Reserve. Collaborative efforts involving the government, local communities, and conservation organizations are crucial in ensuring the long-term conservation and sustainable management of these valuable forest ecosystems.

Despite the positive publicity Kitubulu received for its status as a protected forest reserve, several acres (more than 2 acres) of lakeshore land have been sold, and the remainder is under threat. In 2018, part of the forest was fenced off by a developer who later constructed cottages and lodges for revellers. Entebbe Municipality probed the sale of plots in Kitubulu Forest and the NFA said that the developer was cleared to set up an ecotourism project and would be closely supervised by the forestry body. In January 2022, the Member of Parliament for Entebbe Municipality led an enforcement squad to raze concrete fencing poles erected unlawfully by the developer around Kitubulu Forest Reserve.

In 2022, the National Forestry Authority (NFA) cleared the Fisheries Protection Unit (FPU) of the Uganda People’s Defence Forces to sustainably occupy part (one acre) of Kitubulu Central Forest Reserve in Entebbe Municipality. The FPU was given permission for one year to temporarily establish its headquarters and a storage facility for impounded boats.

== See also ==
- List of Central Forest Reserves of Uganda
