= South Imaramagambo Central Forest Reserve =

Protected area in Uganda

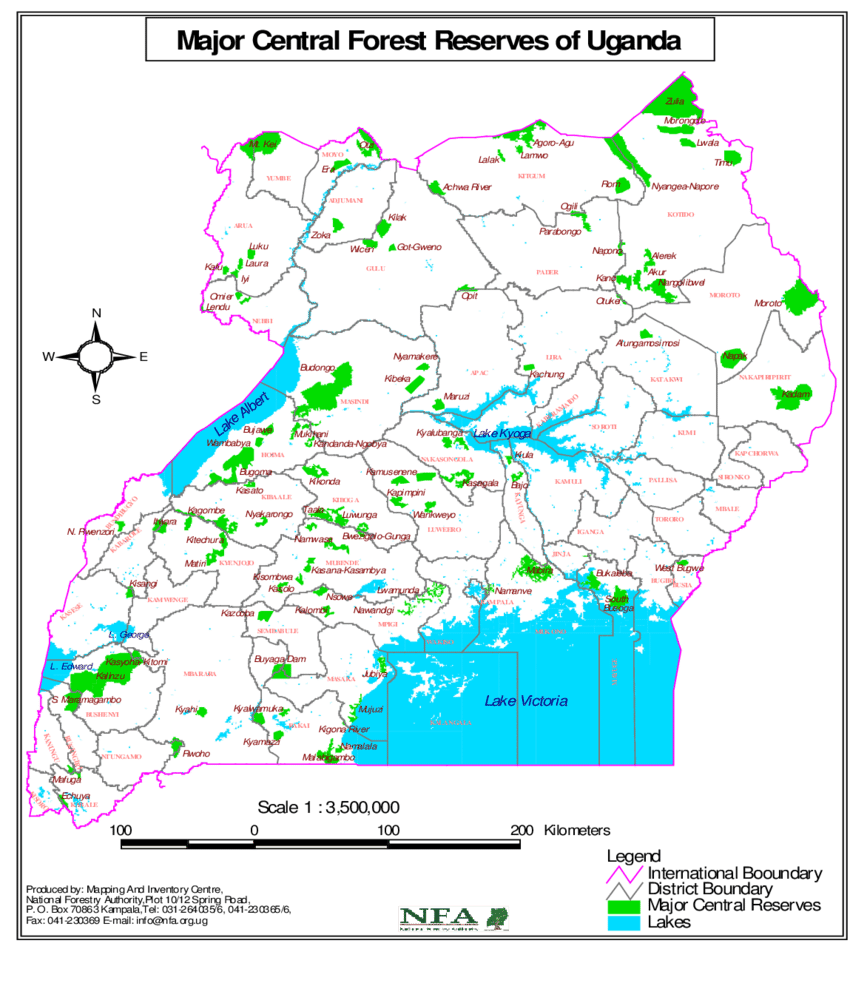
- Map of Uganda showing the location of South Imaramagambo Central Forest Reserve
- Nearest city: Rukungiri, Uganda
- Coordinates: 0°31′40″S 29°53′00″E
- Area: 152 km^{2} (59 sq mi)
- Governing body: National Forestry Authority

South Imaramagambo Central Forest Reserve is a protected area in Rukungiri District in the Western Region of Uganda. It covers an area of 152 square kilometres (59 sq mi).

== Setting and structure ==
South Imaramagambo Central Forest Reserve is a semi-evergreen forest reserve known for providing herbal medicine to the local communities to treat various illnesses. It also provides vital habitat for a variety of plants, crabs, flies and animal species and supporting biodiversity conservation.

== Location and management ==
South Imaramagambo Central Forest Reserve borders Kigezi Wildlife Reserve. It stretches from southwest of Lake Edward; south from the Kigezi Wildlife Reserve toward the Bwindi Impenetrable Forest and Kashoya-Kitomi Central Forest Reserve; and east of Lake George.

It is managed by both the National Forestry Authority (NFA) and the Uganda Wildlife Authority (UWA).

== Challenges ==
This forest reserve was encroached on in 2020 during the COVID-19 pandemic. Trees were cut for timber, fencing poles, firewood, handwalking sticks and charcoal. Part of this forest reserve has been cleared to make way for agricultural crops and pasture.

Inadequate funding for operations and development has weakened the proper implementation of the Uganda's forest policy.
