= Taala Central Forest Reserve =

Forest in Uganda

Taala central forest reserve
- Nearest city: Kyankwanzi

Taala Central Forest Reserve is a protected forest reserve located in Kyankwanzi district in the Central region of Uganda. It is surrounded by the local (rural) communities thus it satisfies the subsistence needs of local people for forest products. Also it supports commercial use especially timber harvesting and environmental protection.

== Setting and structure ==
Taala Central Forest Reserve was a designated forest reserve in 1968. It is reported to cover an area of 88.02 km^{2}. This forest reserve hosts a variety of ecosystems consisting of butterflies, moths, mammals, moist savanna and forest mosaic vegetation plus a wide range of birds.

== Location and management ==
The reserve is situated in Central Uganda. The National Forestry Authority (NFA) that is responsible for the overall management of forest reserves in Uganda, also takes control over the management of this reserve.

== Flora and fauna ==
The forest reserve has a great number of tree species (106) which act as habitat for other creatures. It also favours the survival of 75 different butterfly species, 52 bird species, 14 mammal species and 9 moth species.

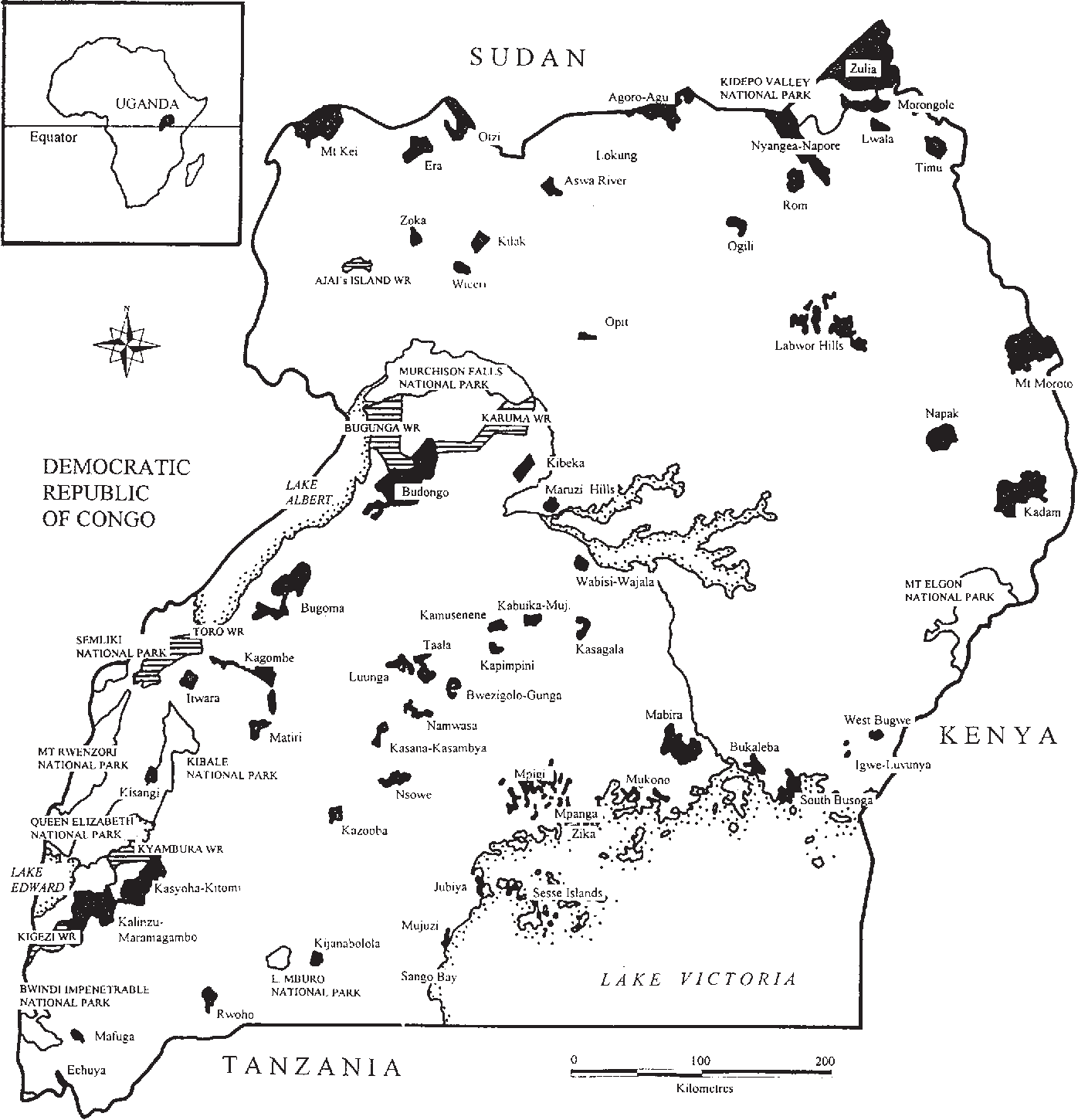
Location of Taala Central Forest Reserve

== Challenges ==
Some of the challenges faced with Taala Central Forest Reserve include illegal settlements, weak forest management capacity to enforce forest rules and regulations on this forest reserve resource use.
