= Kyewaga Central Forest Reserve =

Forested area in Uganda

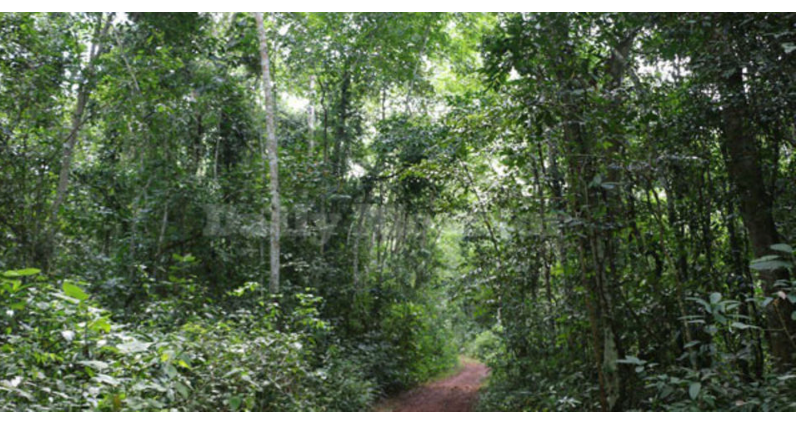
Kyewaga Central Forest Reserve Found in Katabi, Busiro Wakiso, Central Region in Uganda

Kyewaga Central Forest Reserve is a forested area located in Wakiso District, Uganda. The reserve is known for its rich biodiversity and ecological significance. However, in recent years, it has faced various threats and challenges, including sand mining, fish ponds, and encroachment by licensed tree planters.

== Location and overview ==
Kyewaga Central Forest Reserve is situated in the Central Region of Uganda, specifically in Wakiso District. It covers a substantial area and serves as an important natural habitat for diverse flora and fauna. The reserve is known for its lush vegetation, wildlife species, and ecological services.

== Threats ==
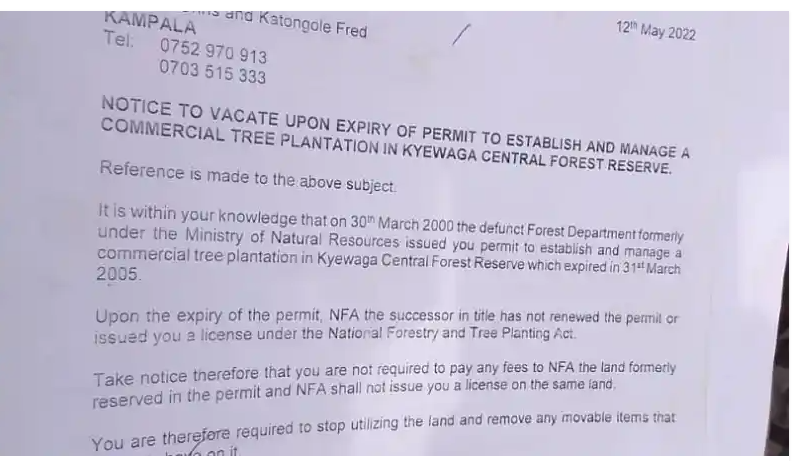
Kyewaga central reserve police letter from NFA serving occupants that needed to vacate the area to allow more tree planting

One of the major threats to Kyewaga Central Forest Reserve is illegal sand mining. The extraction of sand from the reserve has caused significant environmental degradation, including erosion, loss of habitat, and disruption of natural waterways. Sand mining activities have not only affected the forest ecosystem but also nearby communities relying on the forest for various resources.

Another issue plaguing Kyewaga Central Forest Reserve is the establishment of fish ponds within its boundaries. Some individuals have encroached upon the reserve, converting parts of it into fish farming areas. This encroachment has led to the destruction of forested areas and disruption of the natural balance of the ecosystem.

In an effort to address the encroachment and degradation of Kyewaga Central Forest Reserve, the National Forestry Authority (NFA) has issued eviction orders to licensed tree planters who have encroached upon the reserve. The NFA aims to reclaim the degraded forest land and restore it to its original state. These measures are part of the broader conservation efforts to protect the forest's ecological integrity.

== Conservation and restoration efforts ==
Recognizing the importance of Kyewaga Central Forest Reserve, there have been initiatives to restore and conserve the forest's natural resources. The NFA, along with other environmental organizations and government agencies, is working towards restoring the degraded areas, implementing sustainable management practices, and raising awareness about the importance of forest conservation.
