= Kasyoha-Kitomi Central Forest Reserve =

Central Forest Reserve in Western Uganda

Kasyoha-Kitomi Forest
- Kasyoha-Kitomi Forest Reserve
- Location within Uganda
- Location: Western Region, Uganda
- Nearest city: Mbarara
- Coordinates: 01°14′47″S 30°15′0″E

Kasyoha-Kitomi Forest Reserve is located in Western Uganda, 35 kilometers from Bushenyi Town, South of Lake George and the Kazinga Channel, and covers an area of 433 square kilometers along the South of Lake George and Kazinga channel in the Albertine region. The reserve is situated in the administrative districts of Bushenyi, Rubirizi, Ibanda and Kamwenge.

Kasyoha-Kitomi Forest Reserve is near Queen Elizabeth National Park and Kyambura Wildlife Reserve to the West, and is bordered by Kanyambogo in the North, Kyamuhanga Tea Estate and Ndangaro Parishes to the South, Maramagambo and Kalinzu Forest Reserves in the South-Eastern side, Rwanjere to the Eastern side.

It is one of Uganda's few remaining medium altitude moist forests and was designed as a forest reserve in 1932 covering Kasyoha by 77 km^{2} and Kitomi by 90 km^{2} which was later regazzeted as Kasyoha-Itomi Forest Reserve in 1948. In 1996 and 1997 respectively, the Lubare ridge located in the South and Kakasi in the North were added to the forest reserve.

== Setting and structure ==
Kasyoha-Kitomi covers 392 square kilometers. It is located at a Latitude of (01^{0}14'47^{0} South) and Longitude (30^{0}15'^{0} East).

== Wildlife ==
The Kasyoha-Kitomi Forest Reserve is a home to Primates like chimpanzees, blue monkeys, red-tailed monkeys, black-and-white colobus, vervet monkeys, and olive baboons, as well as small mammals, Crater lakes such as the Twin Lakes of Kamweru and Kyema, Transparent Lakes, Waterfalls, Deep Gorges, Birdlife, butterflies and moths, reptiles, and flowers.

Currently, Kasyoha-Kitomi has 308 bird species and more than 276 bird species have been reported from the Forest Reserve, of which the white-naped pigeon (Columba albinucha) and grey parrot (Psittacus erithacus) are regarded as Internationally Near-threatened.

One Albertine Rift endemic species, the blue-headed sunbird, is known to exist in Kasoha-Kitomi. The other species which are biome include Afep pigeon, black bee-eater, blue-throated roller, dusky long-tailed cuckoo, white-collared oliveback, cinnamon-chested bee-eater, Shelley's greenbul, Equatorial akalat, and mountain illadopsis and other undocumented ones.

Kasoha-Kitomi is also a home to a variety of threatened and non-threatened animals such as elephants, chimpanzees, and L'Hoest's monkeys.

The Forest Reserve have several small mammals, including three rare forest-dependent shrews; northern swamp musk shrew, eastern musk shrew and hero shrew.

== Activities ==
The reserve is a home for a variety of activities such as Forest Walks, Canoeing, Bird Watching, Sightseeing, Conversation Education, Camping, and Community Walks. The Camping Site at Magambo leads to the crystal-clear Lake Kamunzuku via a three-hour walking trail.

== Conservation status ==
The reserve is surrounded by many communities who impose risks on the forest resources. In 2004, Nature Uganda initiated a Participatory Environmental Management project (PEMA Phase 1) to introduce the Collaborative Forest Management Approach.

In 2007, Nature Uganda was given a grant of $1.5m (about sh2.4b) by the Danish Development Agency to conserve the forest reserve.

In 2008, National Forest Authority went into agreement with Buzenga Environmental Conservation Association which was aimed at allowing the residents to use the Forest reserve for bee-keeping activities and making handcrafts and herbal medicines.

== See also ==
- List of Central Forest Reserves of Uganda
- Wambabya Central Forest Reserve
- Itwara Central Forest Reserve
