= Bukaleba Central Forest Reserve =

Forest in Uganda

- Bukaleba Forest
- IUCN category III (natural monument or feature)
- Location within Uganda
- Location: Eastern Region, Uganda
- Nearest city: Mayuge
- Coordinates: 0°23′20″N 33°23′10″E
- Area: 97 km^{2} (37 sq mi)
- Max. elevation: 1,368 metres (4,488 ft)
- Established: 1932
- Governing body: National Forestry Authority

Bukaleba Central Forest Reserve is located in Mayuge Districtand 120 km east of Kampala, Uganda. It was first gazetted in 1932 as forest reserve.

== Setting and structure ==
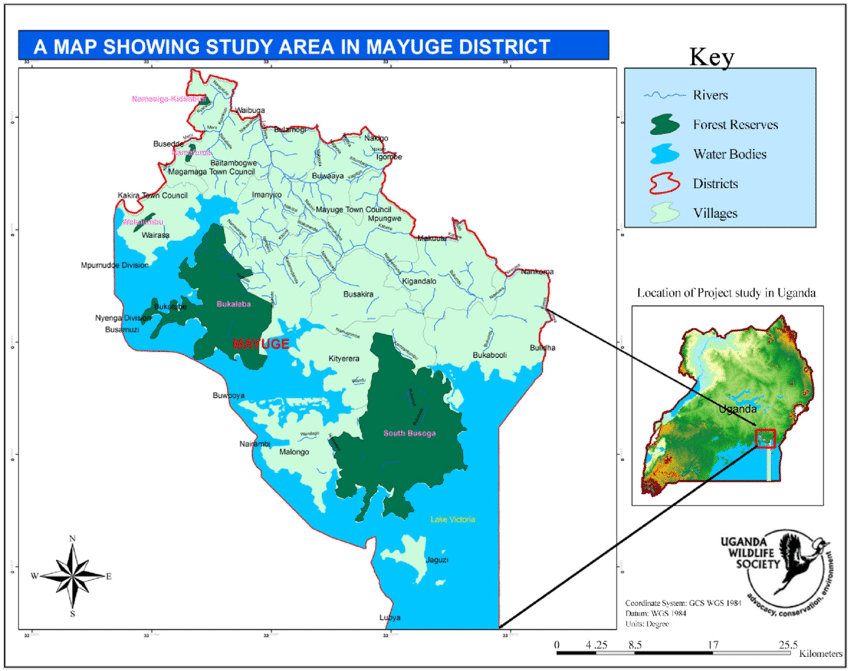
Its geographical location

Bukaleba Central Forest Reserve covers four villages of Nakalanga, Bukaleba, Walumbe, and Namugongo and lies in the Chiefdom of Bunya in Mayuge District. It covers an area of 97 square kilometers with an altitudinal range of 1158m to 1334m.

The government introduced the Bukaleba Forest Project in 2012 that focused on reafforestation using pine, eucalyptus and Maesoposis Eminii tree species and is to last for 42 years.

In 2019, the government of Uganda degazetted some parts of this forest reserve to settle the landless residents of Mayuge district with help of National Environmental Management Authority alongside National Forestry Authority and the Lands Ministry.

Bukaleba Central Forest Reserve is protected by National Forestry Authority afforestation and reforestation project with the general goal being able to contribute to the mitigation of climate change.

This forest reserve was known for Prunas Africana tree species for herbal medicine, buffalos, monkeys, leopards and 47 bird species.

== Challenges ==
This forest reserve has experienced a number of small to medium-sized fires, extreme climatic conditions such as drought. The forest reserve is facing a problem of charcoal burning activities by the locals as confirmed by environmental officials.
