= Mount Kei Central Forest Reserve =

Forest in Uganda

- IUCN category VI (protected area with sustainable use of natural resources)
- Location within Uganda
- Nearest city: Koboko
- Coordinates: 3°41′N 31°08′E
- Area: 384 sq.km
- Governing body: National Forestry Authority

Mount Kei Central Forest Reserve is a protected area located in Koboko district, in the extreme north-west of Uganda. It covers an area of 384 square kilometers and is known for its diverse ecosystem consisting of dense savanna vegetation, forest, scrubland and a wide range of wildlife.

== Location and structure ==
Mt Kei Central Forest Reserve was formerly known as Mount Kei Rhino Sanctuary. It is also situated in the Sudan-Guinea Savanna biome. It borders Kaya river and the international border with Sudan in the north, river Kechi in the east. Its co-ordinates, latitude and longitude are N03.59134 and E31.09947, respectively. It receives mean Annual Rainfall of 1250 millimetres and mean Annual Temperature of 23 ∘ C. This reserve has an elevation range of 915–1,330 m and is mainly classified into dry Combretum-Terminalia savanna and Butyrospermum savanna woodland. The National Forestry Authority(NFA) which is in charge of managing, demarcating, re-surveying and maintaining all Central Forest Reserves in Uganda. The population around the reserve is sparse.

== Flora and fauna ==
The reserve can broadly be classified into dry Combretum-Terminalia savanna and Butyrospermum savanna woodland, scrubland and a wide range of wildlife. It also has 175 bird species, 54 moths species, 21 mammal species,126 butterflies species and 229 tree species.

== Activities and attractions ==
The region is largely undisturbed by human activities. Mount Kei Forest Reserve is mainly used as a source of firewood, honey, construction poles, medicinal plants and it also acts as a water catchment area. Another activity is the forest hikes which help in exploring the entire reserve.

== Challenges ==
The persistence war in South Sudan poses a great danger to such areas since its yields to a great number of refugees seeking for a place of relocation. Another threat are the wild fires and agriculture.
