= Nakindiba Central Forest Reserve =

Forest reserve in Uganda

Coordinates: 0.442°N 32.394°E

- Nakindiba forest
- IUCN category III (natural monument or feature)
- Location: Central Region, Uganda
- Nearest city: Wakiso district
- Area: 142 ha (350 acres)
- Governing body: National Forestry Authority

Nakindiba Central Forest Reserve, a protect area located in Wakiso district, is a 142 hectares forest reserve with a boundary length of 7.2 kilometers. It is situated in Central Uganda and is protected by the National Forestry Authority under National Forest and Tree Planting Act.

== Setting and structure ==
The forest reserve was degraded twenty years ago, however, in 2021, several residents used hoes and pangas to restore the formerly degraded forest reserve. The Minister of State for Foreign Affairs, Henry Oryem Okello, led a tree planting exercise in Wakiso District with officials from the National Forestry Authority (NFA), Lady Heads of Diplomatic and Consular Missions, and representatives from international organizations. The forest restoration exercise was part of the festivities organized by the Ministry of Foreign Affairs to honor 2021's International Women's Day, which was held on March 8 with the theme "Women in Leadership: Achieving an Equal Future in a Covid-19 World".

== Conservation ==
Community interest, government programs, interventions from the National Forestry Authority, and environmental conservation agencies were among the elements that contributed to the regeneration of Nankidiba forest cover. Through the NFA, the government established a program in which it delivered free seedlings (indigenous seedlings) to communities in order to encourage the growth of indigenous trees. Over 35 nurseries (nursery beds) throughout the country provide free indigenous seedlings.

== Biodiversity ==
The forest reserve has several important tree species that are vital to the biodiversity. These include; Musambya, musiizi - melias derachi, prunus africana, and croton macropacas.

== Threats and interventions ==
Over 30% of Nakindiba forest reserve was destroyed by locals in the 2000s. However, under the Nankidiba Forest Restoration Project to restore the degraded areas implemented by Nature Uganda in collaboration with the National Forestry Authority (NFA).

Nakindibiba forest reserve being in an urban area in Uganda, Wakiso, faces numerous threats from human activities such as illegal logging, charcoal burning, farming, and settlement. These activities have led to deforestation, soil erosion, loss of biodiversity, and habitat destruction for wildlife. To protect the forest reserve, measures such as community sensitization, law enforcement, and reforestation programs have been put in place.
