= Guramwa Central Forest Reserve =

Forest in Uganda

- Guramwa forest
- IUCN category III (natural monument or feature)
- Location within Uganda
- Location: Kibaale District, Western Region, Uganda
- Nearest city: Kisoro town
- Coordinates: 0°57′42.4″N 31°20′45.6″E
- Area: 1,550 ha (6.0 sq mi)
- Governing body: National Forestry Authority

Guramwa Central Forest Reserve is a protected area located in Western Uganda's Kibaale district. It is managed by the National Forestry Authority and was first gazetted in 1932 under the National Forestry and Tree Planting Act, 2003 with an area of 230 ha (0.9 sq mi), and was later re-gazetted in 1968 with an area of 1,550 ha.

== Setting and structure ==
Guramwa Central Forest Reserve is part of the Albertine Rift montane forests, which is located in the Albertine Rift region. The Albertine Rift is a branch of the East African Rift that stretches from Lake Albert's northern end to Lake Tanganyika's southern end. It is one of richest biodiversity hotspot areas in Uganda.

== Conservation status ==
There have been reports of degradation of Guramwa central forest reserve by local communities adjacent to the forests. The National Forestry Authority reports high rates of deforestation asserting that five of the 16 major forest reserves in Kibaale district including Gurama are totally "clean-shaven" with scarcely any trees remaining. Ruzaire, Kanaga, Nyabiku, and Kagadi are the other four. Even though the forest reserve has constantly been under threat from encroachers and depleted for charcoal burning, there has been recurrent need for explaining the boundaries separating the forest reserve and individual pieces of land. In August 2013, President Yoweri Kaguta Museveni was drawn to controversy concerning the borders of the Guramwa Central Forest Reserve.

== See also ==
- Mabira Forest
- Bugoma Forest
- Itwara Central Forest Reserve
- Budongo Forest
- Rwensambya Central Forest Reserve
- List of Central Forest Reserves of Uganda
