= Kikumiro Central Forest Reserve =

Protected forest in Kabarole, Uganda

Coordinates: 0.727°N 30.588°E

- Kikumiro forest
- IUCN category III (natural monument or feature)
- Location within Uganda
- Location: Western Region, Kabarole District, Western Region, Uganda
- Nearest city: Fort Portal
- Area: 7.21 km^{2} (2.78 sq mi)
- Max. elevation: 1,604 metres (5,262 ft)
- Governing body: National Forestry Authority

Kikumiro Central Forest Reserve is a forest located in Kabarole district, 300 kilometres (190 mi) from Kampala, Western Uganda and is protected by National Forestry Authority. The reserve is bordered by Ntoroko and Kagadi districts to the north, Kibaale to the east, Kamwenge to the south and Bundibugyo to the west. The communities living around this forest reserve include Kyarutwe, Kyembamba, Kyongera, Mitoma A, Ibaale and Barahiija communities that are close to villages of Bihanga and Kyarukomi A. It covers a total land area of 7.21 square kilometres (2.78 mi^{2}) and was gazetted in 1948 as a Forest Reserve under the National Forestry Authority.

== Setting and structure ==
Kikumiro Central Forest Reserve is situated at Latitude 0.65454° or 00° 39' 16.34" North and Longitude 30.28816° or 30° 17' 17.37" East. Kikumiro Central Forest Reserve is also known for its highest and most prominent mountain with a height of 1604 m above sea level approximately.

== Conservation ==
Kikumiro Central Forest Reserve is a protected forest reserve area managed by National Forestry Authority, a government entity that enforces conservation of the existing ecosystem in all forest reserves and greatly reducing deforestation for settlement and charcoal burning.

== See also ==
- Mabira Forest
- Ihimbo Central Forest Reserve
