= Nyabiku Central Forest Reserve =

Gazetted forest reserve in Kibaale District, Uganda

Nyabiku Central Forest Reserve is a gazetted forest reserve in Kibaale District, Uganda. It is located in the sub-counties of Mugarama and Nyamarunda, approximately 10 kilometers (6.2 mi) from Kibaale Town. The reserve covers an area of 3,400 hectares (8,400 acres).

== Setting and structure ==
Nyabiku Central Forest Reserve is one of the most heavily encroached forest reserves in the region. Kibaale is one of the districts facing the highest levels of deforestation in Uganda. Of the 16 central forest reserves that the district has, five of them including Nyabiku are completely ‘clean-shaven’ – with hardly any tree standing. The other four are: Guramwa, Ruzaire, Kanaga, and Kagadi.

The main causes of encroachment are: Poverty since the people who live around the reserve are impoverished and rely on the forest for a living. The forest is used for timber, firewood, charcoal, and grazing. The population surrounding the reserve is also rapidly increasing, putting a strain on the forest resources. Another cause is inadequate enforcement where the National Forestry Authority (NFA) lacks the resources necessary to effectively enforce the law against encroachment.

== Flora and Fauna ==
Nyabiku Central Forest Reserve is home to a diverse range of flora and fauna, including over 300 bird species and several endangered primates such as the chimpanzee and the red-tailed monkey. Additionally, the reserve provides valuable timber and non-timber forest products for local communities, while also attracting ecotourism to the area. As such, it is crucial that the reserve is managed sustainably to ensure its continued protection. The reserve is managed by the National Forestry Authority.

== Threats ==
Nyabiku forest reserve faces several threats, including deforestation, illegal logging, poaching, and encroachment by agricultural activities. These threats jeopardize the biodiversity and ecosystem services provided by the forest, as well as the livelihoods of local communities. Sustainable forest management practices and community engagement is crucial to ensure the continued protection and benefits of the reserve.

In 2017, the National Forestry Authority rolled out plans to hire forest reserves in Kibaale including Nyabiku through a bidding process to individuals to venture into commercial tree growing on a 49-year lease basis. However, there were challenges in this process since some of the forest reserves were not well demarcated and the local community from Kibaale district did not feel well engaged in the process citing cases of favoring foreigners over locals. Moreover, local leaders complained about the capital intensive nature of their engagement and called for need for financial inclusive procedures that will not leave them out of the bidding process to ensure its sustainability.

Forestry officials attribute the significant loss of forest cover to an increase in the number of immigrants. Since 1972, when the then-government relocated thousands of people from Kigezi's densely populated areas and resettled them in Kibaale, the district has drawn hundreds of visitors each year. This influx of people has increased demand for land and resources, leading to deforestation and forest cover loss. The forestry authorities are addressing this issue through a variety of initiatives, including the promotion of sustainable land use practices and community forestry programs. However, balancing the needs of a growing population with the conservation of valuable forest ecosystems remains a complex and ongoing challenge.

In 2013, the High Court halted the eviction of encroachers before forest reserve boundaries were ascertained and surveyed to prevent claims of people who wanted to include their plots of land in the forests. However, this was less effective since forest encroachment and depletion continued with forests such as Nyabiku depleted up to 60%. Other depleted forest reserves include Kijuna and Muhunga at 70% and Guramwa, Kananga and Ruzaire at 100%.

== See also ==
- List of Central Forest Reserves of Uganda
- Bugoma Forest
