= North Rwenzori Central Forest Reserve =

Forest reserve in Western Uganda

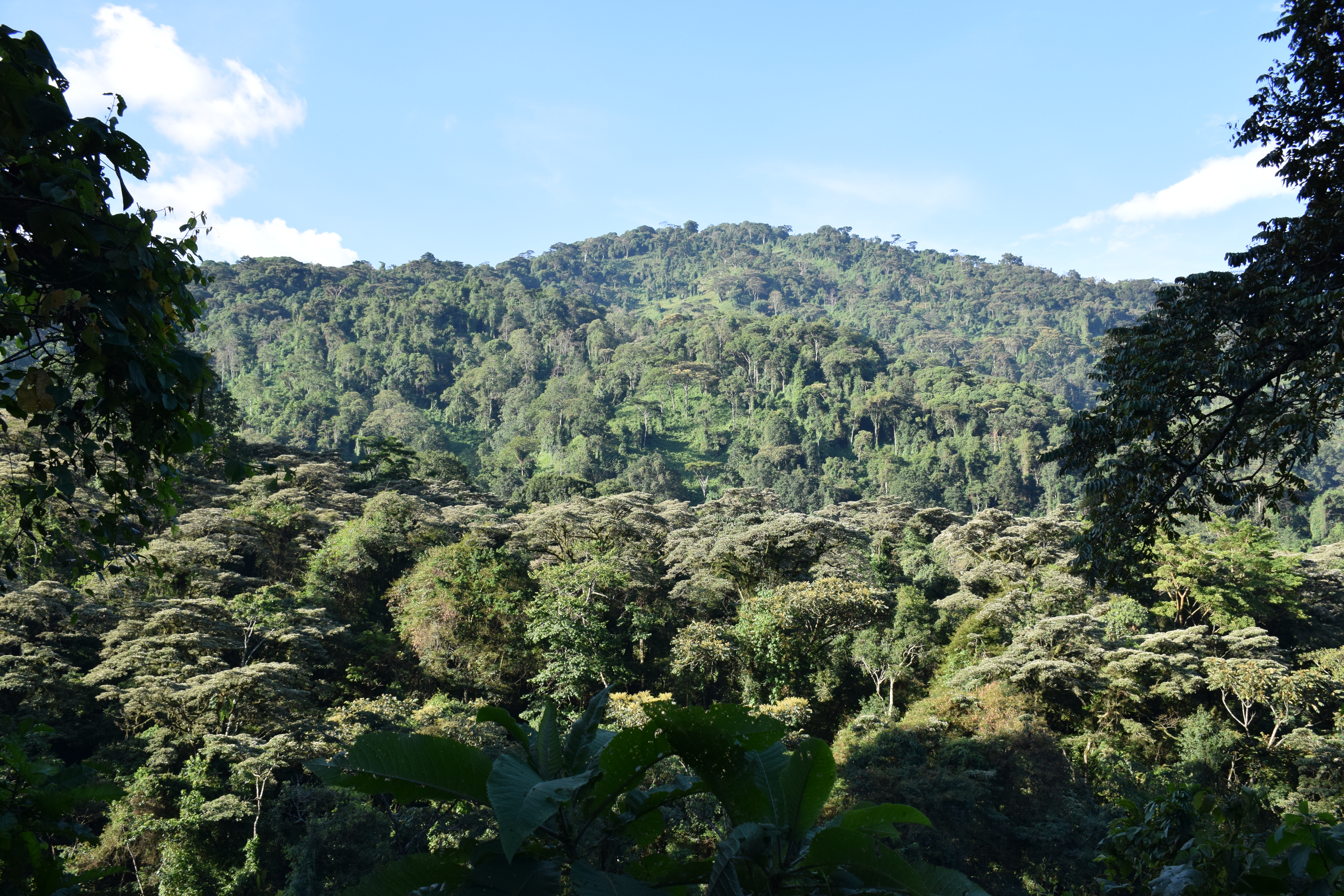
- Part of the forest reserve

- Location within Uganda
- Location: Bundibugyo District and Ntoroko District
- Nearest city: Fort Portal
- Coordinates: 0.810°N 30.213°E
- Area: 3,531.58 ha (13.6355 sq mi)
- Established: 1941
- Governing body: Uganda Wildlife Authority

North Rwenzori Central Forest Reserve is a protected tropical forest situated between Bundibugyo District and Ntoroko District in Western Uganda. This Natural Forest Reserve is at the foothills of the Rwenzori Mountains east of the Democratic Republic of Congo.

== Setting and structure ==
The North Rwenzori Central Forest reserve's boundaries were demarcated in 1931 and then gazetted in 1941. The forest covers 3531.58 hectares.This forest reserve is found on one of the six massifs of the Rwenzori lying on the eastern side of the Western Rift Valley. It is 1000 meters above sea level near Sempaya Hot Springs and reaches 2167 meters above sea level on its western side. The reserve is also dominated by different vegetation zones, with grassland covering 20% of the area, bushland and colonizing forests covering 70% and 10% of the forest reserve respectively.

== Wildlife ==
The variety of species in the North Rwenzori Central Forest Reserve are not yet explicitly known since it has not yet been assessed. However, this reserve shares the same biodiversity with the Rwenzori National Park. The species in the National Park are mostly endemic to the Albertine Rift.

== Conservation status ==
The forest reserve faced a problem of fire outbreaks in 2016 which were caused by the climate changes in the country. In 2013-14, there was an establishment of 190 new plantations in the reserve by the National Forestry Authority of Uganda. Conservation efforts in the forest reserve are limited due to misuse of funds by the management of the forest reserve.

== See also ==
- Central Forest Reserves of Uganda
- Rwenzori National Park
- National Forestry Authority
- List of Central Forest Reserves of Uganda
