= Rwampara district =

Rwampara District
- District
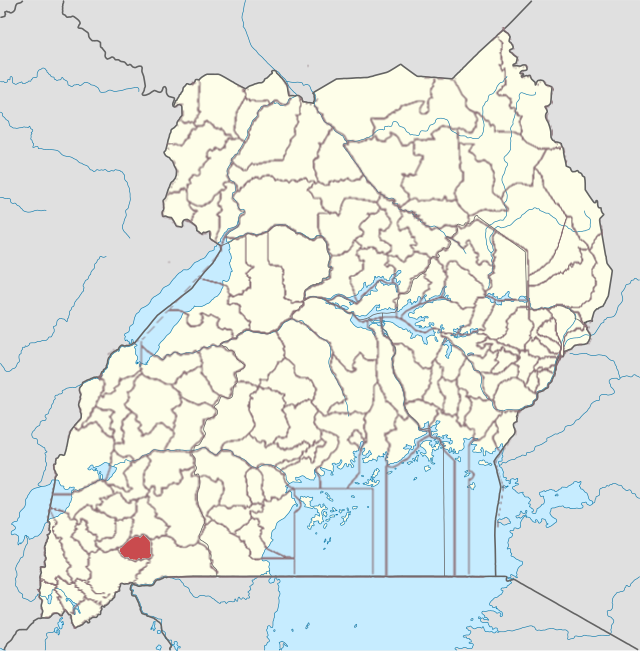
- Rwampara district, Uganda
- Interactive map of Rwampara District
- Coordinates: 00°36′S 30°36′E
- Country: Uganda
- Region: Western Uganda
- Sub-region: Ankole sub-region
- Capital: Kampala

Area
  - Total: 1,846.4 km^{2} (712.9 sq mi)
  - Land: 1,778.4 km^{2} (686.6 sq mi)
- Elevation: 1,800 m (5,900 ft)

Population (2014 Estimate)
  - Total: 270,465
  - Density: 250.6/km^{2} (649/sq mi)
- Time zone: UTC+3 (EAT)
- Area code: 135
- Website: www.rwampara.go.ug

Rwampara District is a district in South Western Uganda. The district was carved out of Mbarara District and given the district status in July 2019.

== Location ==
The district borders Sheema District in the north, Isingiro and Mbarara District in the east, Isingiro District in the south and Ntungamo District in the west.

== Overview ==
Rwampara District was granted district status in 2019. The district got its name from the county name Rwampara that was upgraded to the district status. The district has its headquarters in Kinoni Town.

== Sub Counties ==
The District contains the following Sub counties Mwizi, Bugamba, Ndeija, Rugando, Buteraniro-Nyeihanga Town Council, Kinoni Town council and Kabura Town Council.

== See also ==
- Mbarara District
