= Rwensama Central Forest Reserve =

Protected area in Uganda

Coordinates: 1.666°N 31.524°E

Rwensama Central Forest Reserve is a tropical high forest found in Masindi District in Uganda. It covers 127 hectares and it is meant for ecological and environmental purposes.

It is managed by the National Forestry Authority (NFA) which is responsible for demarcations and re-surveying of the central forest reserves.

== Structure and geography ==
The forest is used for research purposes by the Nyabyeya Forestry College. It protects river Sonso that is used by the local people.

== Wildlife ==
Rwensama forest has different types animals which include chimpanzees, over 84 species of plants and trees which include Mahogany.

== Conservation status and strategies ==
The Wildlife Conservation Society partnered with the National Forestry Authority (NFA) and trained field NFA staff in the Albertine region to do smart data analysis in 2021 using mobile phones, laptops and GPS units. The Wildlife Conservation Society also participated in the restoration of Rwensama forest reserve.

== Threats ==
Charcoal burning, hunting, illegal lumbering, firewood collection, cash crop farming and production such as sugarcanes, rice and tobacco.
