= Mpanga Central Forest Reserve =

Forest in Uganda

Coordinates: 0.2063°N 32.3016°E

The Mpanga Central Forest Reserve is a Forest Reserve in Uganda. It is a small patch of natural equatorial rainforest covering 453 hectares (1,120 acres). It is situated in Mpigi District, Mpambire, 37 km southwest of Kampala City. Onsite is Mpanga Forest Resort managed by Global Afric Safaris since 2018.

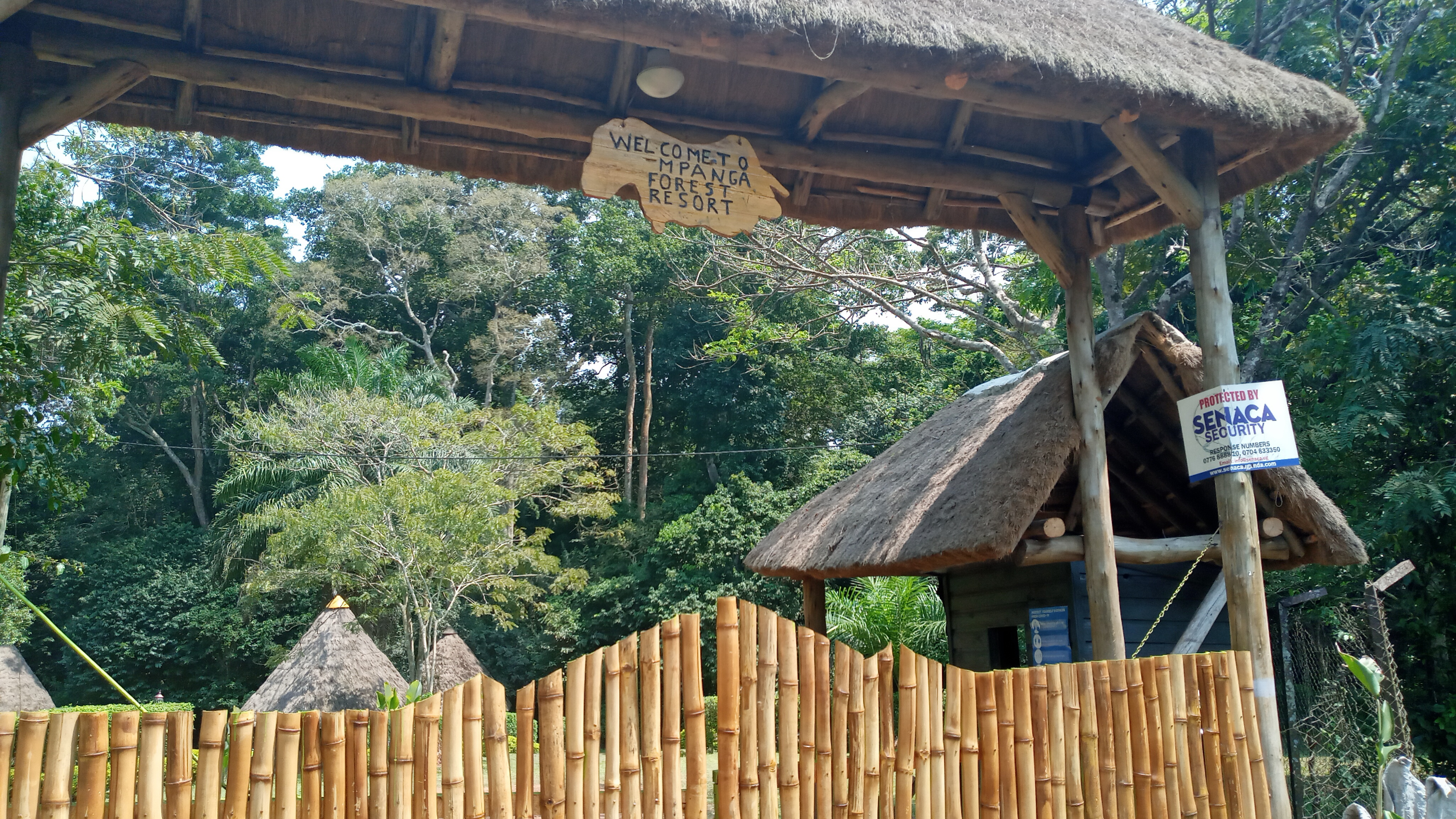
The Bamboo Gate of Global Afric Safaris' Mpanga Forest Resort at Mpanga Forest

== Location ==
Mpanga Central Forest Reserve is in the Central Region of Uganda, Mpigi District, Mpabire, to be exact. By road, it is 37 km Southwest of Kampala City. It can easily be accessed through a one hour drive along the main Kampala – Masaka Highway. This makes Mpanga Central Forest Reserve the closest natural equatorial rainforest to the Capital City.

== History ==
It was a small patch of natural rainforest that was protected by the Government of Uganda as a scientific research site since 1953. According to its neighboring farmsteads, it belonged to a wealthy family which carried the name Mpanga. It was actually named after the rich family's son, Mpanga.

== Ecology ==
It supports an impressive biodiversity for such a small forest. It has 500 species of trees and shrubs, 300 species of birds, 97 butterflies, and 112 moths. Three species of monkeys can be seen in the forest including vervet, red-tailed and black and white colobus monkey. There is also a number of small mammals including banded mongoose, squirrels, pottos, pangolines and bushabies. If you spend a night at Mpanga Forest you have a chance of spotting the rare nocturnal pottos and bushbabies.

The dominant tree species in Mpanga Forest is the hard and weather resistant Celtis. Mpanga Forest is surrounded by a community of traditional drum makers who look for the soft trees that are suitable for the drum making, and therefore the undesirable hard Celtis trees have so much saved the forest from exploitation by the drum makers. The communities however do still depend on the forest for firewood, charcoal and medicinal hubs.

== Activities ==
The activities are divided to two major categories namely;

Forest Activities

Forest Trails are well developed into four main routings namely: The Baseline Trail, the Hornbill Trail, the Butterfly Trail to best suite these activities;

- Nature Walks
- Bird Watching and Identification
- Primate Watching
- Butterfly Identification
- Walk Racing
- Dirt Biking
- Mountain Cycling
- Hiking
- Running
- Camping

Leisure Activities

These are done available for those not yet ready for the forest; Community Led Activities SDG Village. An NGO called Climate Smart Youth Action Network (CSYAN) is implementing an SDG model Village as a community-led initiative for promoting climate-smart action around the forest boundaries. Peniel Rwendeire the Technical Advisor for CSAYN discovered such a need in 2020 during the lockdown and has been mobilizing different stakeholders to be part of the initiative.(http://www.csyan.org/)

- Silent Disco
- Volleyball
- Board games
- Campfire
- Photography
- Videography
