= Ihimbo Central Forest Reserve =

Forest reserve in Uganda

- Ihimbo Forest
- Location within Uganda
- Location: Rukungiri District, Western Region, Uganda
- Coordinates: 0°40′0″S 29°49′59″E
- Area: 4.77 square Kilometers
- Governing body: National Forestry Authority (NFA)

Ihimbo Central Forest Reserve, located in western Uganda, is one of the protected forest reserves in Uganda which is found in Rukungiri district. The Forest Reserve is situated near the villages of Bwambara and Kikongi. The forest reserve is endowed with natural herbs that are medicinal and cure ailments in the human body and managed by National Forestry Authority. The forest reserve was gazetted in 1965.

== Setting and structure ==
Ihimbo Central Forest Reserve covers a total of 4.77 km^{2.}

It is located at latitude 0° 40' 0" South and longitude 29° 49' 59" East.

== Medicinal plants ==
Ihimbo Central Forest Reserve is well known for its medicinal purpose that it plays in the lives of local communities living around the forest. The forest covers communities like Bwambara, Kikarara, Rwenshama, Nyabubare and Kikongi. All these parishes are found in Bwambara sub-county in Rukungiri district, South Western Uganda. The plants found in this forest reserve include commonly used medicinal plants such as Asteraceae, Fabaceae, Solanaceae, Lamiaceae, Poaceae and Eurphobiaceae with 26, 21, 12, 21, 11 and 10 species cited respectively as documented in the research findings of Mbarara University for Science and Technology.

== Language ==
The language widely spoken by communities around Ihimbo Central Forest Reserve is Runyankole/ Kiga.

== Controversies ==
The key challenges facing the forest reserve are crosscutting. According to a study conducted by Mbarara University for Science and Technology, the challenges facing Ihimbo Central Forest Reserve include destruction for farmland, poaching, encroachment, human settlements, illegal extraction of park resources and political pressure to de-gazette park land, Hunting of bush meat, illegal harvesting of timber and other plant products, charcoal making, encroachment for farmland mining, political pressure to de-gazette or change the land use of forest reserves. The 108 km2 of the forest has been cleared for eucalyptus tree planting.

== See also ==
- Mabira Forest
- Budongo forest
- List of central forest reserves in Uganda
