= Rwensambya Central Forest Reserve =

Tropical forest preserve in Uganda

Coordinates: 0.449°N 31.091°E

Rwensambya Central Forest Reserve is a tropical forest located in Kyegegwa district. It covers an area of 671 hectares.

== Wildlife ==
The reserve is a home to chimpanzees, monkeys such as red-tailed and black and white colobus monkeys, mangabeys and birds. Chimpanzees are among the major causes of death in this reserve.

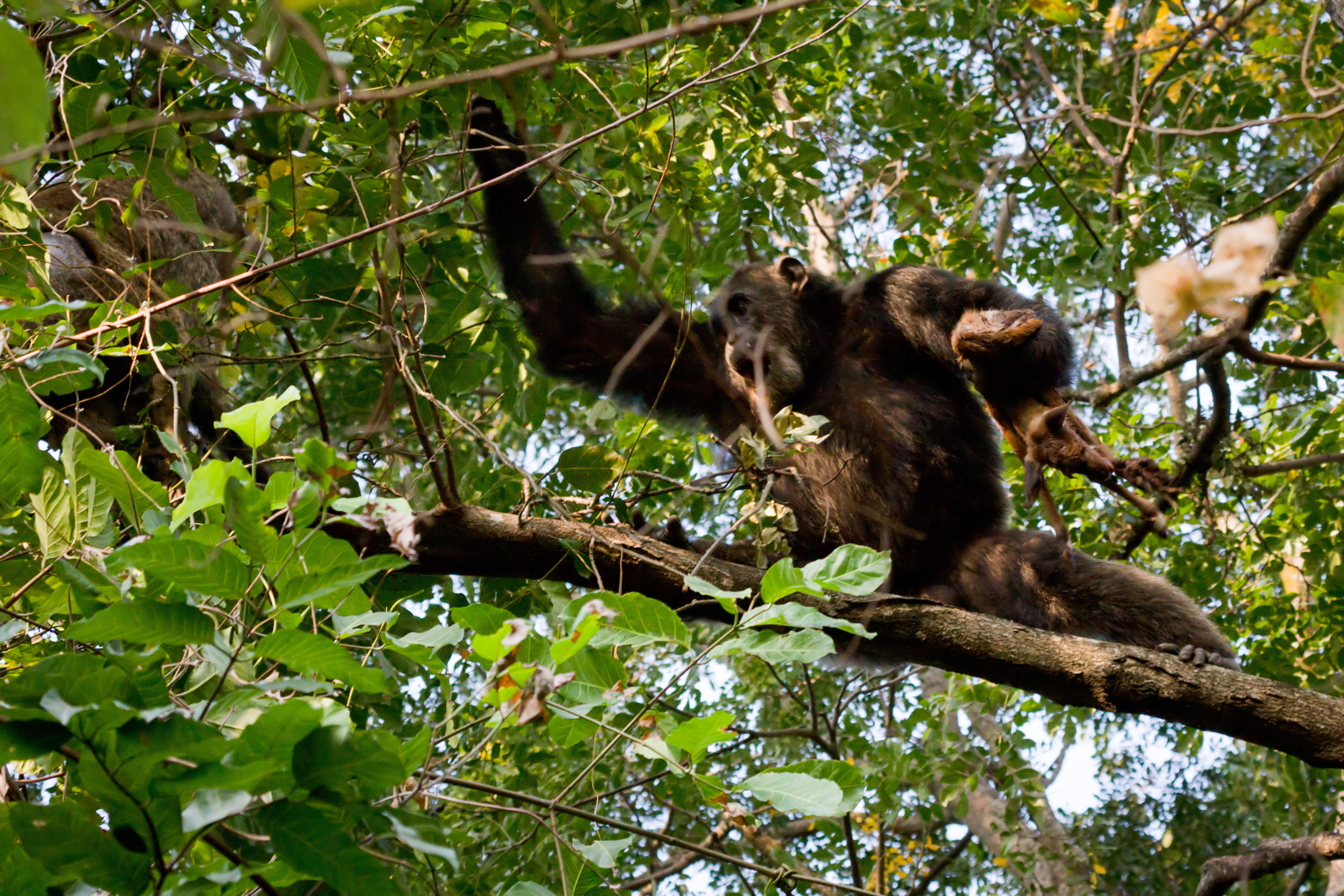
Adult male Eastern chimpanzee

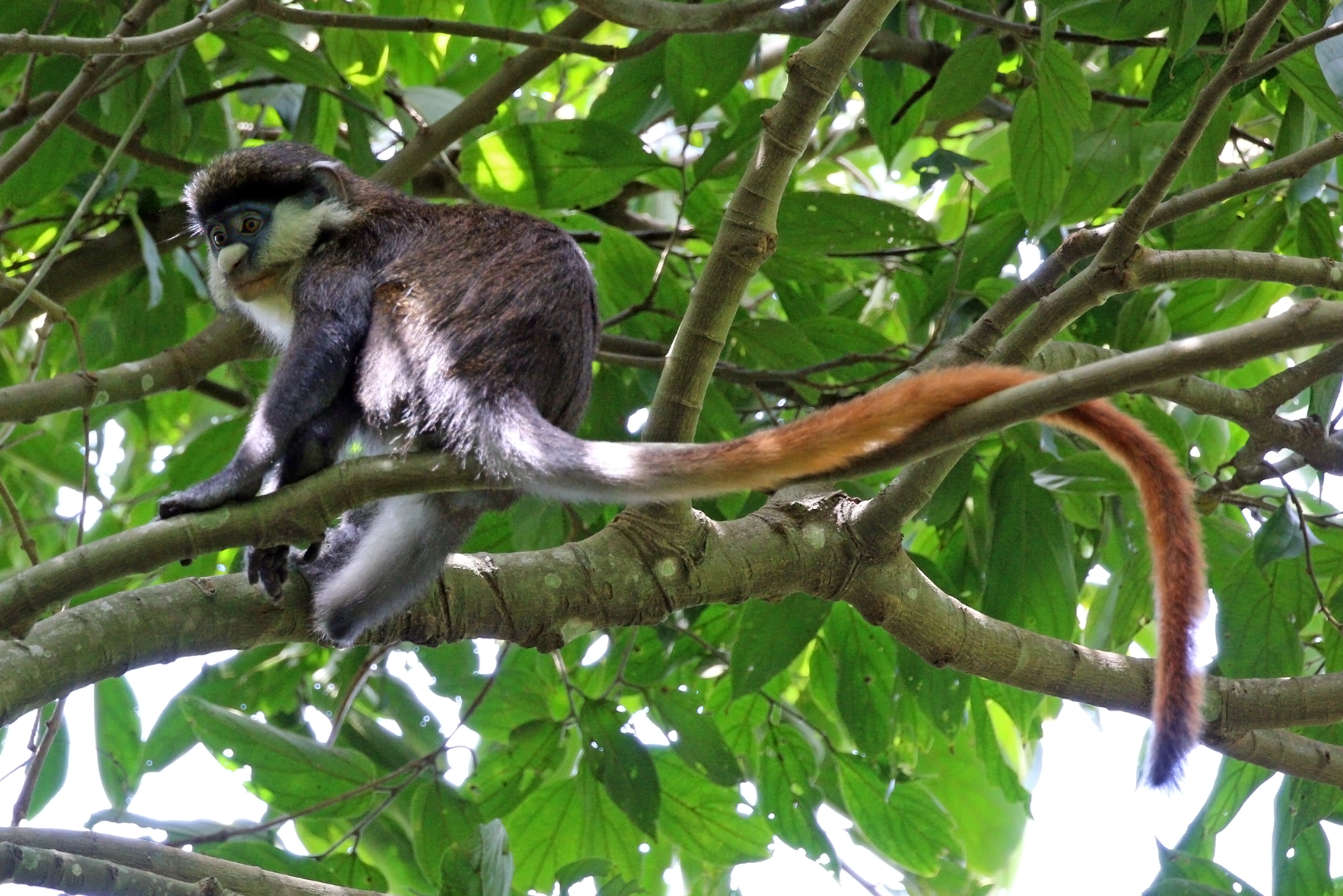
Red-tailed monkey

== Conservation status ==
in 2014, the NFA started a campaign of evicting all the people who illegally stayed in the government forest reserves around Uganda including Kyegegwa and Kyenjojo after Yoweri Kaguta Museveni issued a directive to evict those people.

Associations such as Kabweeza Tree Growers Association (KTGA) have been founded to preserve the forest reserve. But KTGA also rented the forest reserve land to people and they planted in maize and other crops.

The staff of National Forestry Authority (NFA) slashed the crops which included coffee trees, maize plants and ovacado trees claiming them to be planted with in the demacations for the forest reserve. The natives pleaded that NFA had planted trees and branded NFA poles that acted as boundaries for the forest reserve and their land. NFA set up monitoring and supervision offices within this reserve to monitor the human activities.

In 2021, the UNCHR partnered with NFA to replant trees and managed to restored 100 hectares of forest cover this reserve with the seedlings that were provided by the NFA.

== Threats ==
Some of the common threats to the forest reserve include human activities such as charcoal burning and production, illegal logging, cultivation/agriculture.

== See also ==
- Central Forest Reserves of Uganda
- Mabira Forest
- Itwara Central Forest Reserve
- Mpanga Central Forest Reserve
