= Kalinzu Central Forest Reserve =

Protected area in southwestern Uganda

- Kalinzu Forest
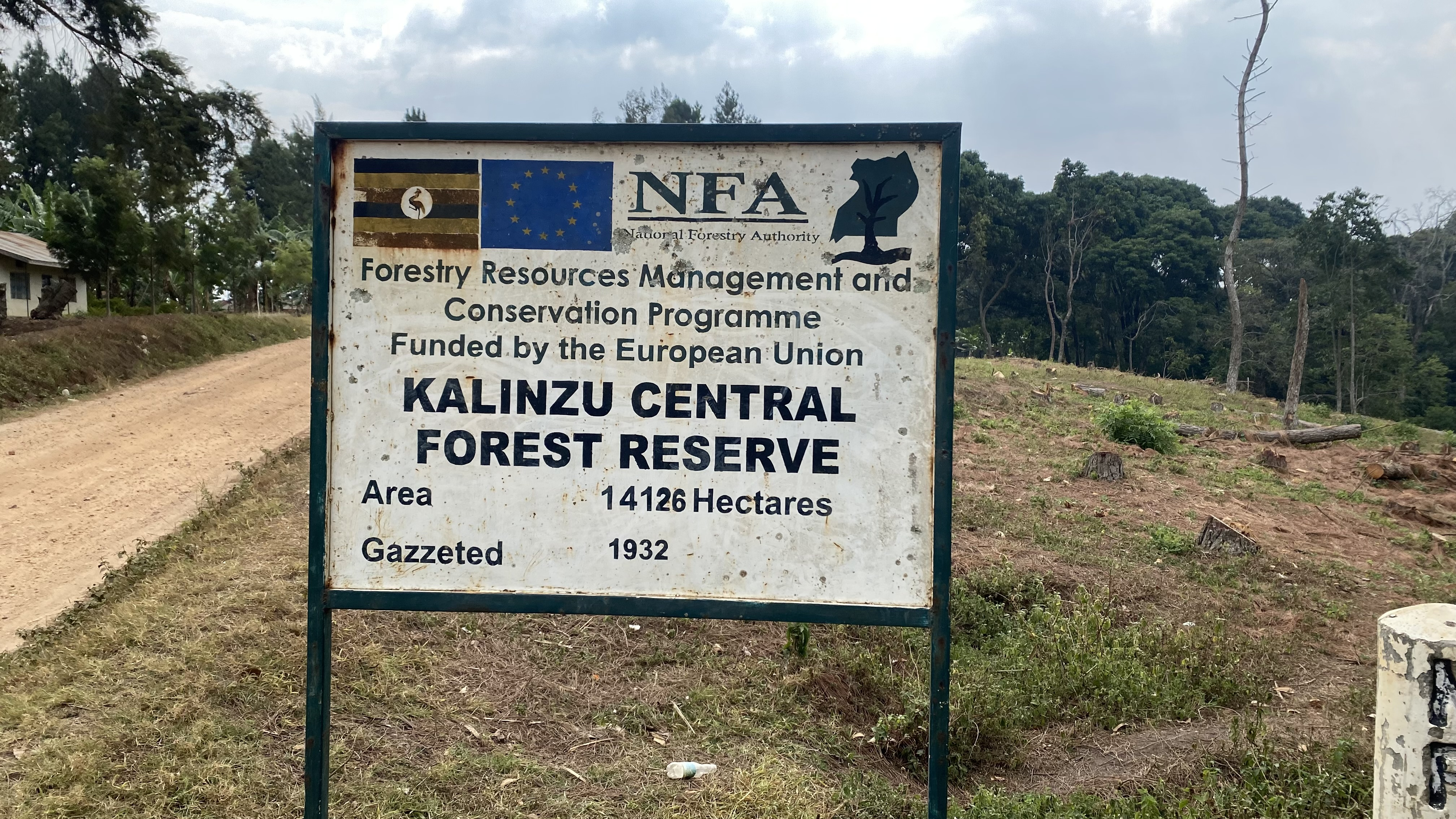
- Kalinzu Central Forest Reserve in Bushenyi in Western Uganda

- Location within Uganda
- Location: Bushenyi District, Western Region, Uganda
- Coordinates: 0°17′S 30°07′E

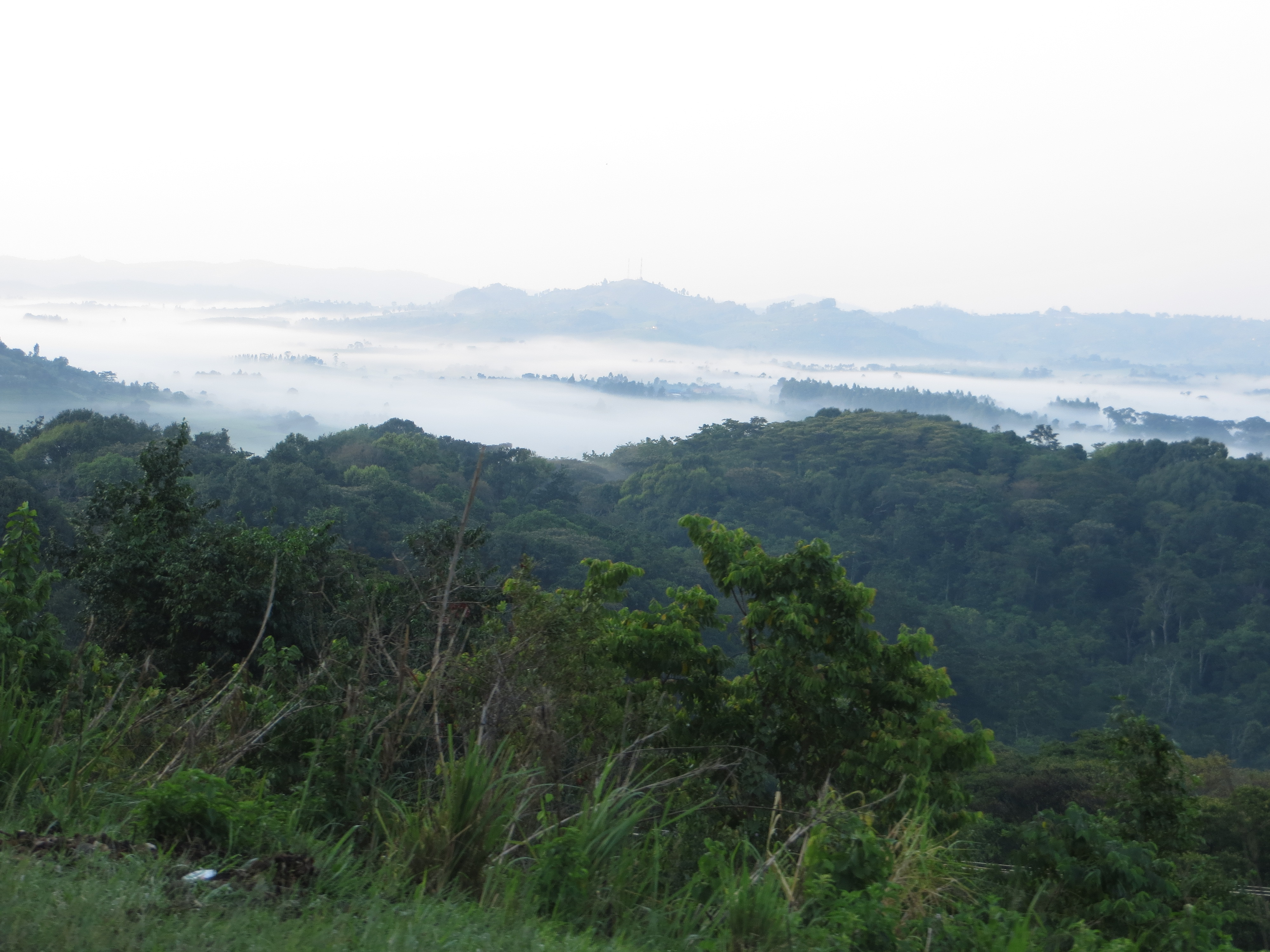
Kalinzu Central Forest Reserve

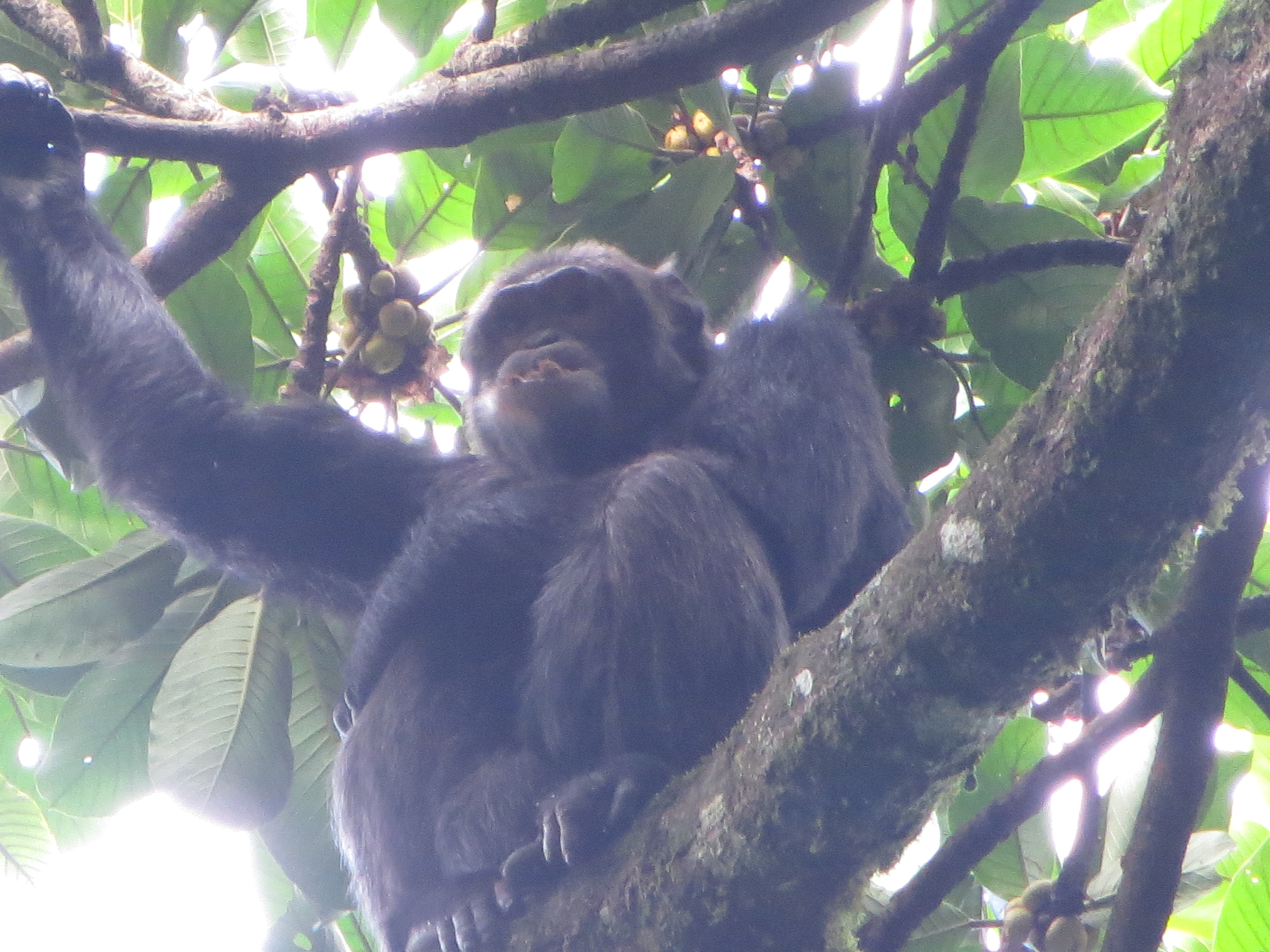
Kalinzu Central Forest Reserve

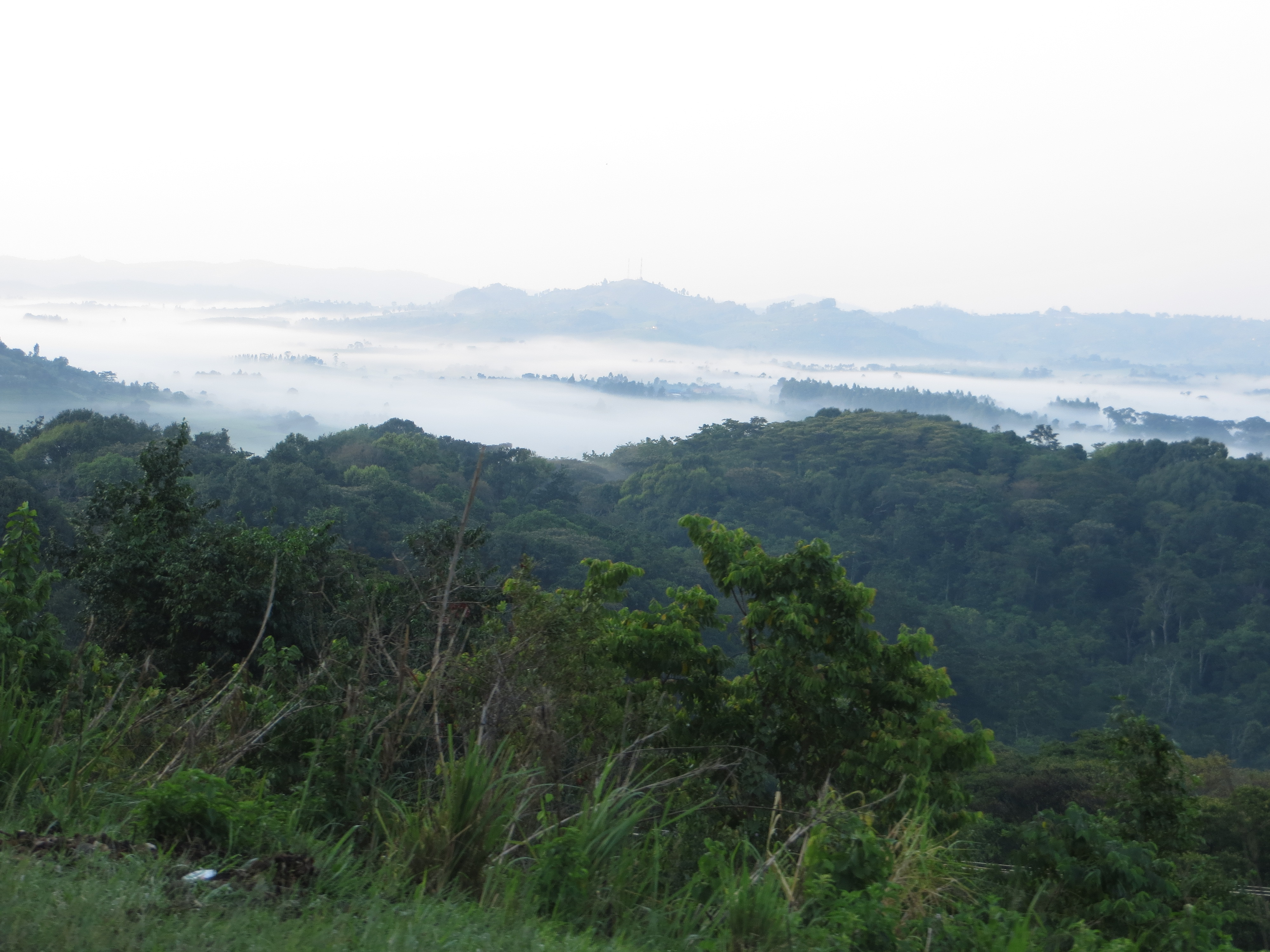
Kalinzu Central Forest Reserve

Kalinzu Central Forest Reserve is a protected area located in Bushenyi district in south-western Uganda. Covering an area of 137 square kilometers, the reserve is characterized by its diverse ecosystem consisting of dense tropical rainforest vegetation and a wide range of wildlife.

== Setting and structure ==
The Queen Elizabeth National Park's Maramagambo Forest and Kalinzu Central Forest Reserve, cover a total area of 580 square kilometers and are adjacent to each other. According to the National Forestry and Tree Planting Act 8/2003, the National Forestry Authority (NFA), which is in charge of managing all 506 Central Forest Reserves in Uganda, is in charge of managing the forest reserve. The Kalinzu Central Forest Reserve, one of Uganda's protected areas, provides vital habitat for a variety of plant and animal species, aiding in the country's attempts to conserve its biodiversity.

=== Flora and Fauna ===
There are 414 different species of trees in the Kalinzu Central Forest Reserve. The reserve's vegetation consists of mixed mature forest, secondary forest with a Parinari predominance, and secondary forest with a Musanga predominance. This diversified collection of habitats maintains a thriving ecosystem and offers refuge to a remarkable variety of wildlife. With 378 different kinds of birds reported inside its borders, the forest reserve is noted for the variety of its bird life. Numerous primate species, including chimpanzees, vervet monkeys, black and white colobus monkeys, and blue monkeys, live there as well.

== Location and Management ==
Kalinzu Central Forest Reserve is situated in south-western Uganda. Its precise latitude and longitude are 30 07'E and 0 17'S, respectively. The National Forestry Authority (NFA), which is in charge of managing all Central Forest Reserves in Uganda, is given control over the management of the reserve. The NFA is essential in preserving the natural balance of the reserve, safeguarding its biodiversity, and encouraging the wise use of its resources.

== Activities and attractions ==
Kalinzu Central Forest Reserve offers visitors a variety of activities and attractions. Forest hikes offer a chance to discover the natural surroundings while taking in the variety of plant and animal life. Scientists and environmentalists interested in researching and protecting the distinctive ecology visit the area frequently for conservation and research purposes. The other activity done in the Reserve is Chimpanzee trekking since it is a home for 320 endangered chimpanzees and 50 of these chimpanzees are habituated with in the forest reserve. The Kalinzu Central Forest Reserve is also well-known for its medicinal plants, which are used extensively by the nearby local populations to treat a variety of illnesses. The purpose of the study carried out within and surrounding the reserve was to examine the diversity, use, and conservation of medicinal plants as well as their significance. This demonstrates how the reserve's cultural and ecological importance go beyond its pure ecological value.

== See also ==
- Mabira Forest
- Budongo forest
- Bujawe Central Forest Reserve
- List of central forest reserves in Uganda
