= Bujawe Central Forest Reserve =

Protected forest in Uganda

- Bujawe Forest
- Location within Uganda
- Location: Western Region, Uganda
- Coordinates: 01°31′54.26″N 31°11′50.21″E
- Area: 31 km^{2} (12 sq mi)
- Governing body: National Forestry Authority (NFA)

Bujawe Central Forest Reserve is a protected tropical forest that is located in Hoima district of western Uganda. The forest covers an area of 50 km^{2}. Bujawe has one named mountain called Buhirigi which has the highest peak and is the most prominent mountain in Uganda with 1130m/3707 ft a.s.l. and the prominence is 60m/197 ft. The size of the forest is 31km2. The estimated terrain elevation is 1079 metres above sea level. The Latitude is 1°31'54.26 while Longitude is 31°11'50.21.

== Setting and structure ==
The forest reserve is situated in nearby localities such as Gamugole, Bukerenge, Nyakabingo, Karanwang. The populated places are Bukerenge, Kiboirya, and Nyabikukuru.

== Conservation status ==
The forest reserve is about 240 hectares of pine and eucalyptus trees which were lost in Bujawe in 2014 when the incident of Bunyoro Forest Fires happened.

== Controversy ==
Eight honey hunters were arrested in connection with the forest burning in Bujawe in 2014. They were charged with burning a gazetted forest against the guidelines of the National Forest and Tree Planting Act 2003 and the police were still hunting for the culprits in Kasongoire. The forest has been affected almost every dry season and in 2012, about 100 hectares of the central Forestry reserve in Uganda were lost due to fire.

== See also ==
- National Forestry Authority
- List of Central Forest Reserves of Uganda
