= Itwara Central Forest Reserve =

Forest in Uganda

Itwara Forest
- Itwara Central Forest Reserve
- Location within Uganda
- Location: Western Region, Uganda
- Nearest city: Fort Portal
- Coordinates: 00°47′29″N 30°28′19″E
- Area: 87 km^{2} (34 sq mi)
- Governing body: National Forestry Authority

Itwara Central Forest Reserve is a body of medium altitude moist semi-deciduous forest in the Kyenjojo District, western Uganda. It is 87 km^{2} in size and is partly used as protection and production forest area by the NFA. 258 plant species have been identified within the forest of which trees compose 248. A group of 120 chimpanzees has been reported living there. Seven species are endemic to this eco-region and 10 are threatened.

Bordering the forests are tea plantations and communities living from subsistence agriculture. Problems in the past have been poaching and encroachment in the northern part of the reserve.
