= Lake Nyamusingire =

Crater lake in Western Region, Uganda

Coordinates: 0°17′11″S 30°01′48″E

- Location within Uganda
- Location: Rubirizi District, Uganda
- Type: Crater lake
- Basin countries: Uganda
- Surface area: 3.84 kilometres (2.39 mi)
- Average depth: 3 metres (9.8 ft)
- Surface elevation: c. 1,010 metres (3,310 ft)

Lake Nyamusingire, also known as Lake Nyamisigeri, is a crater lake in Western Uganda, Rubirizi District. The lake is endowed with flora and fauna that act as tourist attractions.

== Location and setting ==
Lake Nyamusingire lies in Rubirizi District in western Uganda, close to other crater-lake features in the Bunyaruguru area. Some travel guides describe the lake as being near the localities of Chekoba and Nyakiyanja and within the Queen Elizabeth National Park area.

== Geology and formation ==
Western Uganda contains numerous volcanic explosion craters, many of which filled with water to form crater lakes. UWA describes Lake Nyamusingire as a site formed by three connected crater lakes.

== Physical characteristics ==
Studies of greenhouse-gas fluxes from African inland waters describe Lake Nyamusingire as a small, shallow lake (about 3.84 km2, about 3 m deep) with a polymictic mixing regime and eutrophic conditions. GeoNames lists the lake at an elevation of about 1,010 m above sea level.

== Ecology ==
UWA notes Lake Nyamusingire as habitat for the African finfoot (Podica senegalensis). The surrounding Maramagambo Forest supports forest birds and primates on guided walks that include the lake and nearby features such as the Bat Cave and the Blue Lake.

== Public health and research ==
A survey of crater lakes in western Uganda assessing freshwater snails linked to schistosomiasis surveillance included Lake Nyamusingire among sampled sites and reported a location and altitude for the lake in its site table.

== Tourism ==
Tourism operators market the lake for nature walks around Maramagambo Forest, birdwatching, and non-motorised lake activities such as canoeing and kayaking, often paired with visits to the nearby Bat Cave and other crater-lake viewpoints. The Uganda Hotel Owners Association’s hotel guide lists a lodge that overlooks Lake Nyamusingire in Rubirizi District.

== Conservation ==
The lake sits within a protected landscape managed under the Queen Elizabeth National Park system, and UWA promotes guided access through Maramagambo Forest routes that include Lake Nyamusingire and nearby attractions.

== See also ==
- Lake Nyaguo
- Lake Edward
- Lake Bujuku
- Queen Elizabeth National Park
- Maramagambo Forest
- List of lakes of Uganda
