= Lake Kibwera =

Lake in Uganda

- Location within Uganda
- Location: Queen Elizabeth National Park, Rubirizi district, Western Uganda
- Coordinates: 0°09′16″S 30°08′32″E
- Type: Crater lake
- Basin countries: Uganda

Lake Kibwera is a Ugandan crater lake in Queen Elizabeth National Park in Western Uganda. The lake has different fish species which is preferred by its surrounding community. The lake is also known as a habitat for crocodiles relocated from nearby lakes like Lake George as they pose a threat to human life. Lake Kibwera is a protected area managed by Uganda Wildlife Authority (UWA) and Ministry of Tourism, Wildlife and Antiquities.

== See also ==
- Lake Kyema
- Lake Nyamusingire
- Lake Bujuku
