= Kyambura Game Reserve =

Protected area in Uganda

- IUCN category III (natural monument or feature)
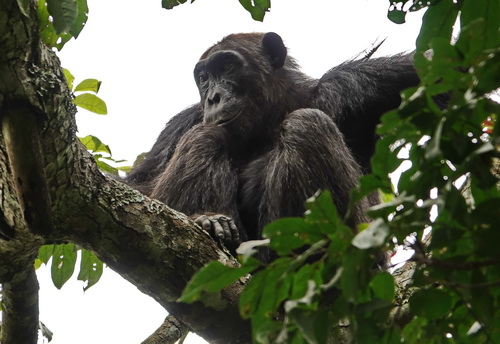
- Chimpanzee at Kyambura Game Reserve
- Interactive map of Kyambura Game Reserve
- Location: Rubirizi district
- Nearest city: Kasese Town
- Coordinates: 0.137°S 30.084°E
- Area: 156 square units
- Max. elevation: 1100m
- Min. elevation: 700m
- Established: 1965
- Governing body: Uganda Wildlife Authority
- World Heritage site: 1965

Kyambura Game Reserve or Chambura Game Reserve, which includes the Kyambura Gorge, adjoins the Queen Elizabeth National Park in Uganda. It is home to a variety of wildlife. The area is an important water source for many animals and is surrounded by savanna, but is generally noted for its high concentration of primate life located in the gorge.

== History ==
Kyambura Game Reserve was formed as the Kyambura Controlled Hunting Area in 1962, and upgraded to game reserve status in 1965. In the 1980s the southern area was colonised, but these people were evicted in 1990, and the land rented out to a private concessionaire called Zwilling. After the Uganda Wildlife Statute of 1996 changed the name of all game reserves to wildlife reserves, the reserve became formally known as the Kyambura Wildlife Reserve. The hunting concession was terminated in 1999 due to illegal hunting.

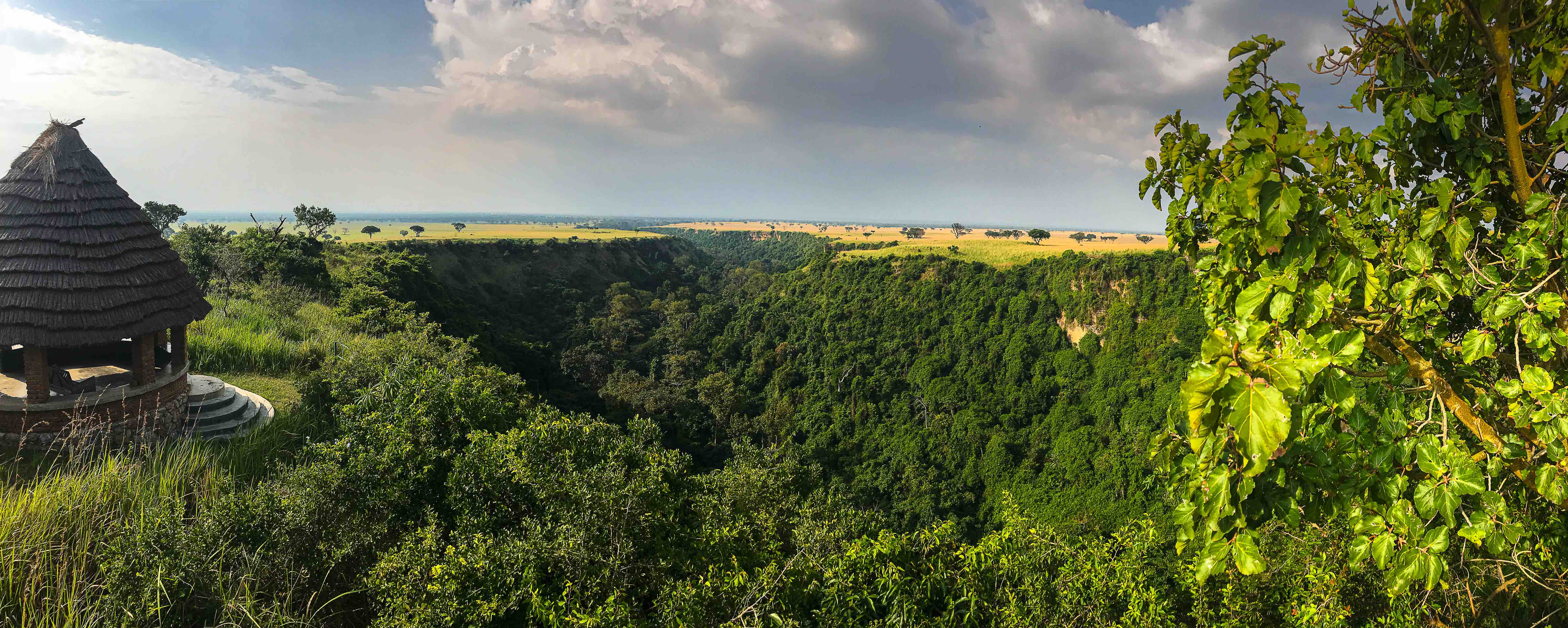
Kyambura Gorge in western Uganda

It serves as a buffer zone to the Queen Elizabeth National Park (QENP).

== Geography ==
Kyambura is located on north-eastern side of QENP, approximately 30 km from QENP Headquarters. Kyambura Gorge spans a distance of 11 km and links to the Kazinga Channel, which forms the northern boundary of the reserve. Village and plantations lie to the south. The reserve's mean altitude is 1100 m.a.s.l. The total area of the reserve is 156 sq. km.

Kyambura and QENP, together with Maramagambo Forest and Kigezi Game Reserve, all adjoin, and are referred to as the Queen Elizabeth Protected Area (QEPA), this borders Parc National des Virunga (Virunga National Park) in the Democratic Republic of the Congo, and together these areas completely encircle Lake Edward. Other nearby protected areas are Kibale National Park to the northeast and Rwenzori Mountains National Park to the northwest.

The landscape is gentle rolling savanna grassland, but is deeply cut by the 16 km Kyambura Gorge, which supports a thick riverine forest and the Kyambura River.

Dominic Johnson classifies the bird communities of the game reserve according to thirteen habitat types.

== Wildlife ==
Kyambura is the only place in QEPA where habituated chimpanzees are seen. Other types of primates include red-tailed monkey, black-and-white colobus, baboons and vervet monkeys. The park is also known for its variety of avian species including various falcons, the blue-headed bee-eater and the African finfoot. The chimpanzees in Kyambura Gorge were isolated after the forests connecting it to larger forests like Kalinzu and Maramagambo were cleared. Conservationists are worried that this could lead to inbreeding and mutations. While tracking chimps, visitors are treated to views of the "underground forest" (the forest growing in the gorge), birds and smaller primates.
