= Lake Kayumbu =

Lake in Uganda

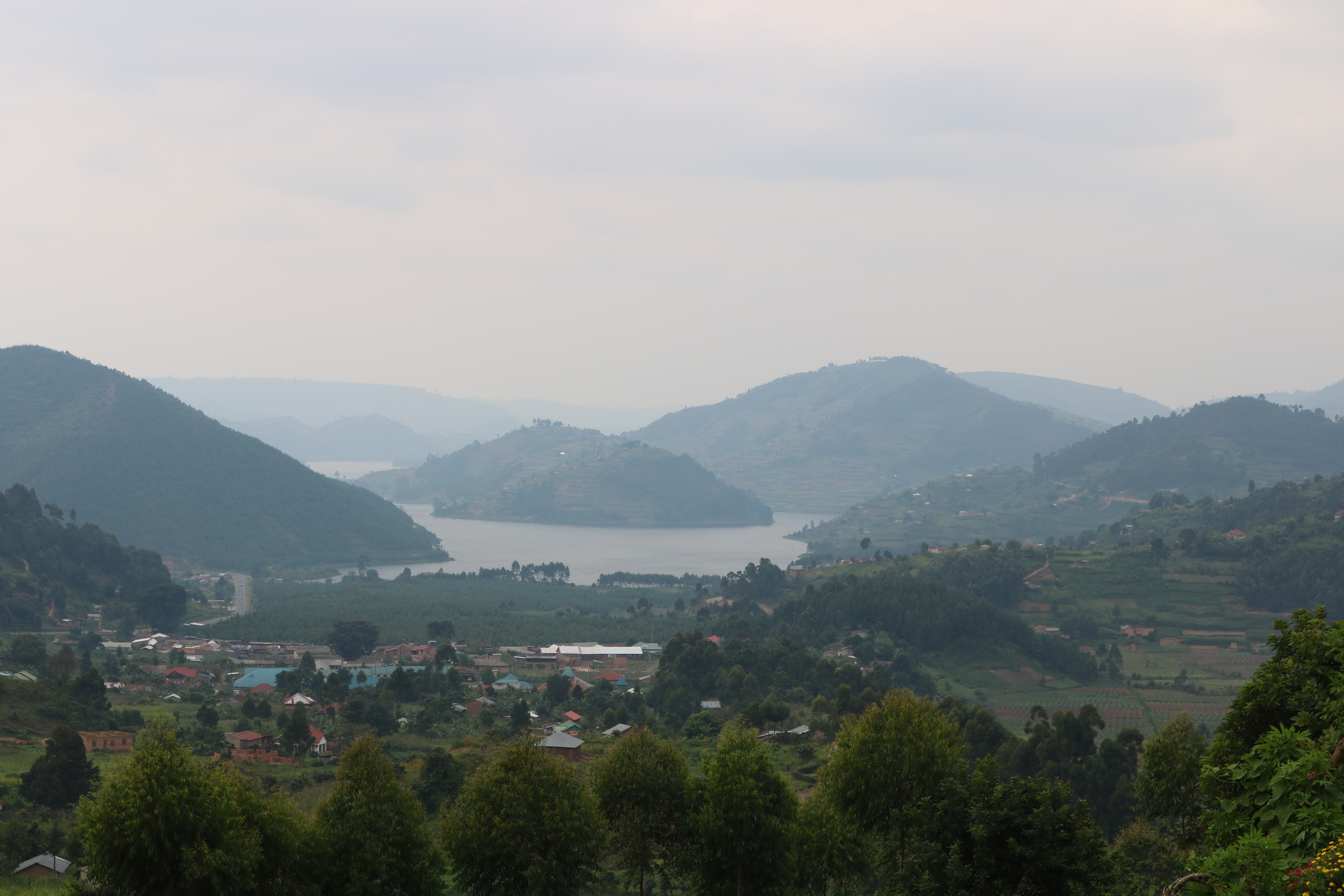
- Kisoro, Southwestern Uganda

- Location within Uganda
- Location: Kisoro District, Uganda
- Coordinates: 1°20′14″S 29°47′10″E
- Max. length: 2 kilometres (1.2 mi)
- Max. width: 1 kilometre (0.62 mi)
- Surface area: 2.2 kilometres (1.4 mi)
- Average depth: 5 metres (16 ft)
- Surface elevation: 1,897 metres (6,224 ft)

Lake Kayumbu, also known as Lake Kayumba, is a lake in Kisoro District, South Western Uganda, north of the Rwanda border at an altitude of 1,897 metres (6,224 ft) above sea level. The lake acts as a tourist destination which earns the country foreign exchange. The lake has a variety of fish species.

== Geography and setting ==
Lake Kayumbu lies in the highlands of Kisoro District, within the wider Kigezi area of south-western Uganda. A limnological baseline survey of six south-western Ugandan lakes reported Lake Kayumbu as a small lake (surface area 2.2 km2) at about 1,890 metres above sea level, near Lake Chahafi and close to the Rwanda border.

Kisoro District is a high-altitude district with multiple surface water bodies and wetlands, including lakes Mutanda, Mulehe, Chahafi and Kayumbu, plus a network of permanent swamps.

== Physical characteristics ==
In published limnological baseline data, Lake Kayumbu has:

- Surface area: 2.2 square kilometres (0.85 sq mi)
- Maximum depth: 5 metres (16 ft)
- Altitude: 1,890 metres (6,200 ft) above sea level

== Limnology and biodiversity ==
Lake Kayumbu was included in a wet-season (September 2014) limnological baseline survey covering lakes in Kisoro, Kabale and Rukungiri districts. The survey collected field measurements and samples for parameters such as dissolved oxygen, temperature, pH, conductivity, nutrients, phytoplankton biomass, zooplankton, and macroinvertebrates to characterise high-altitude water bodies for fisheries productivity planning.

== Human use ==
Lake Kayumbu is visited as part of local nature tourism and hiking routes in south-western Uganda, including treks linking Lake Bunyonyi, Echuya Forest and the Kisoro area.

Travel writing commonly describes Lake Kayumbu and nearby Lake Chahafi as a paired landscape viewpoint, separated by a ridge, with wide views across the surrounding hills.

== Fisheries ==
The Kisoro minor lakes have long supported small-scale fisheries. A fisheries resource review reported low combined catches from four Kisoro minor lakes in 1998 (16 metric tonnes), alongside high prices at the time and low per-capita fish consumption linked to limited supply.

== Conservation and pressures ==
Kisoro District’s high population pressure has contributed to extensive land-use change and encroachment on natural vegetation in parts of the district, alongside risks linked to steep slopes and fragile highland ecosystems. The district profile also notes the importance of wetlands and open water bodies as part of the local hydrology and livelihoods base.

== See also ==
- Lake Chahafi
- Lake Nyagou
- Lake Kyoga
- Lake Edward
- List of lakes of Uganda
