= Kigezi Wildlife Reserve =

Wildlife reserve in Uganda

- IUCN category III (natural monument or feature)
- Location within Uganda
- Location: Uganda
- Coordinates: 0°30′S 29°50′E
- Area: 265 km^{2} (102 sq mi)
- Established: 1952
- Governing body: Uganda Wildlife Authority

Kigezi Wildlife Reserve is a wildlife reserve in western Uganda. It was established in 1952 and covers about 265 km^{2} (102 sq mi). The reserve is managed as part of the Queen Elizabeth Protected Area (QEPA) system, alongside Queen Elizabeth National Park and Kyambura Wildlife Reserve.

== Location and geography ==
The reserve is a southward annex to Queen Elizabeth National Park, separated from Lake Edward by a sector of the national park about 7 km wide. Uganda Wildlife Authority lists its location at 0°30′S, 29°50′E, with an altitude of about 1,050 m (3,440 ft). The reserve lies on the western arm of the Central African Rift Valley.

== Habitat and biodiversity ==
Uganda Wildlife Authority describes the reserve as a mosaic of moist deciduous forest and grass savanna, similar to areas south of Maramagambo Forest in Queen Elizabeth National Park. Dominant trees include Acacia and Albizia species, with grasses reported to include Imperata, Cymbopogon, Hyparrhenia, and Beckeropsis species.

Reported mammals include eastern black-and-white colobus (Colobus guereza), red colobus (Colobus badius), eastern chimpanzee (Pan troglodytes schweinfurthii), lion (Panthera leo), leopard (Panthera pardus), African bush elephant (Loxodonta africana), warthog (Phacochoerus aethiopicus), giant forest hog (Hylochoerus meinertzhageni), hippopotamus (Hippopotamus amphibius), African buffalo (Syncerus caffer), Uganda kob (Kobus kob thomasi), waterbuck (Kobus ellipsiprymnus), bush buck (Tragelaphus scriptus), topi (Damaliscus lunatus), and oribi (Ourebia ourebi). Uganda Wildlife Authority also reports abundant birdlife similar to Queen Elizabeth National Park.

== Management and conservation ==
The reserve is managed by the Uganda Wildlife Authority (UWA), Uganda’s government agency responsible for wildlife management in and outside protected areas. UWA describes the reserve as a buffer zone between Queen Elizabeth National Park and surrounding settled areas, and states there is no internal zoning within the reserve.

A WWF-Uganda assessment reports habitat loss pressures around the wider QEPA system and notes that a portion of the Kigezi Wildlife Reserve area was degazetted in 2002 following heavy encroachment, reducing the size of the wildlife buffer zone and migratory routes. Uganda Wildlife Authority also reports ongoing pressures from encroachment in adjoining areas and poaching for meat, and notes that a road linking the national park to Kabale crosses the reserve.

== See also ==
- Queen Elizabeth National Park
- Uganda Wildlife Authority
