= Lake Kamunzuku =

Lake in Uganda

Coordinates: 0°15′44″S 30°09′23″E

- Interactive map of Lake Kamunzuku
- Location: Rubirizi District, Western Uganda
- Type: Crater lake
- Basin countries: Uganda
- Managing agency: Uganda Wildlife Authority; Ministry of Tourism, Wildlife and Antiquities
- Surface elevation: 1,272 m (4,173 ft)

Lake Kamunzuku is a crater lake in Rubirizi District, Western Uganda, bordering Queen Elizabeth National Park.The lake is located in Nyangororo village, Bunyaruguru County, and was formed through volcanicity, similar to other crater lakes in the district.Local communities traditionally believe the lake has healing properties.

Lake Kamunzuku is a protected area managed by the Uganda Wildlife Authority in collaboration with the Ministry of Tourism, Wildlife and Antiquities. The lake contains clear freshwater that supports active aquatic life.

== Location ==
Lake Kamunzuku lies at an altitude of approximately 1,272 metres (4,173 ft) above sea level.

== Geology ==
The lake occupies a volcanic crater formed by past volcanic activity associated with the western branch of the East African Rift System. It is part of a cluster of crater lakes found in Bunyaruguru County.

== Flora and fauna ==
The lake is surrounded by natural forest with overhanging trees. Wildlife reported in the area includes vervet monkeys, black-and-white colobus monkeys, baboons, forest pigs, and a variety of bird species typical of the Albertine Rift ecosystem.

== Cultural significance ==
Among surrounding communities, Lake Kamunzuku is traditionally regarded as having spiritual or healing properties, and it features in local oral traditions.

== Conservation ==
As part of the greater Queen Elizabeth National Park ecosystem, the lake is subject to conservation regulations aimed at protecting biodiversity and preventing environmental degradation.

== See also ==
- Queen Elizabeth National Park
- Lakes of Uganda
- Western Uganda
- Lake Chahafi
- Lake Mirambi
