= List of lakes of Uganda =

The following is a list of lakes in Uganda.

== Lakes ==
- Lake Albert
- Lake Bisina
- Lake Bugondo
- Lake Buhera
- Lake Bujuku
- Lake Bunyonyi
- Lake Edward
- Lake George
- Kabaka's Lake
- Lake Kachera
- Lake Katwe
- Lake Kayumbu
- Lake Kitandra
- Lake Kamunzuku
- Lake Kwania
- Lake Kyahafi
- Lake Kyoga
- Lake Mburo
- Lake Mutanda
- Lake Mulehe
- Lake Nabugabo
- Lake Nakuwa
- Lake Nkugute
- Lake Nyabihoko
- Lake Nyamusingire
- Lake Opeta
- Lake Saka
- Lake Nyungu
- Lake Rutoto
- Lake Nakivale
- Lake Victoria (shared with Kenya and Tanzania)
- Lake Wamala
