= Katwe craters =

Volcanic field with explosion craters in western Uganda

- Katwe-Kikorongo explosion craters
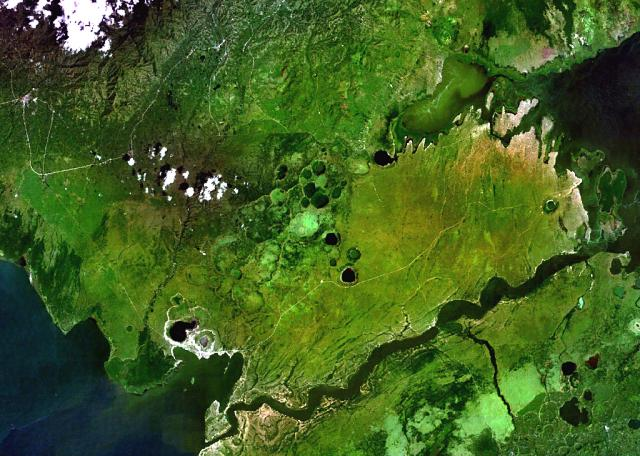
- Landsat image showing lake-filled and dry maars between Lake Edward (lower left) and Lake George (upper right)

Highest point
- Elevation: 1,067 m (3,501 ft)
- Coordinates: 0.08°S 29.92°E

Geography
- Location within Uganda
- Location: Kasese District, Western Region, Uganda

Geology
- Mountain type(s): Volcanic field, maars and tuff cones
- Last eruption: Unknown (evidence credible)

The Katwe craters or Katwe-Kikorongo explosion craters are a group of volcanic craters within Queen Elizabeth National Park in Toro, Uganda. The volcanic field is roughly 210 km^{2} (81 sq mi) in size. The individual craters vary widely in size, but the largest are up to 3 km (1.9 mi) in diameter and 100 m (330 ft) deep. The unusual formations were formed individually by a series of violent volcanic explosions over the last 1 million years. These maar craters are a result of magma coming in contact with groundwater driving large steam explosions. The explosive events created large, low lying craters with few other signs of volcanic activity.

Many of the craters have now developed into saltwater lakes or lush grasslands.

== Overview ==
The first written report of Lake Katwe was penned by Speke, who heard second-hand about a legendarily wealthy source of salt close to the base of the Mountains of the Moon. By that time, the lake had been mined for at least 400 years, and with salt being regarded as more valuable than precious metal in pre colonial Uganda, control of this prized possession regularly shifted between the region's different kingdoms. Indeed when Speke visited Uganda in 1882, Lake Katwe had for some years been part of Toro, but in the late 1870s it was recaptured by Omukama Kabalega, a coup that led to the first military confrontation between Bunyoro and a combined British-Toro expedition led by Captain Fredrick Lugard

Lugard arrived at Katwe in 1890 and recorded that: 'Everywhere were piles of salt in heaps covered with grass, some beautifully white and clean'.

Modern salt making continues and can be seen at Lake Katwe or Kasenyi Crater where local residents maintain a systems of salt ponds. The craters can be visited by more adventurous travelers to the national park. Best viewed from Katwe Explosion Craters Track, a rough, single lane dirt track that climbs through the hills and runs along several crater rims.

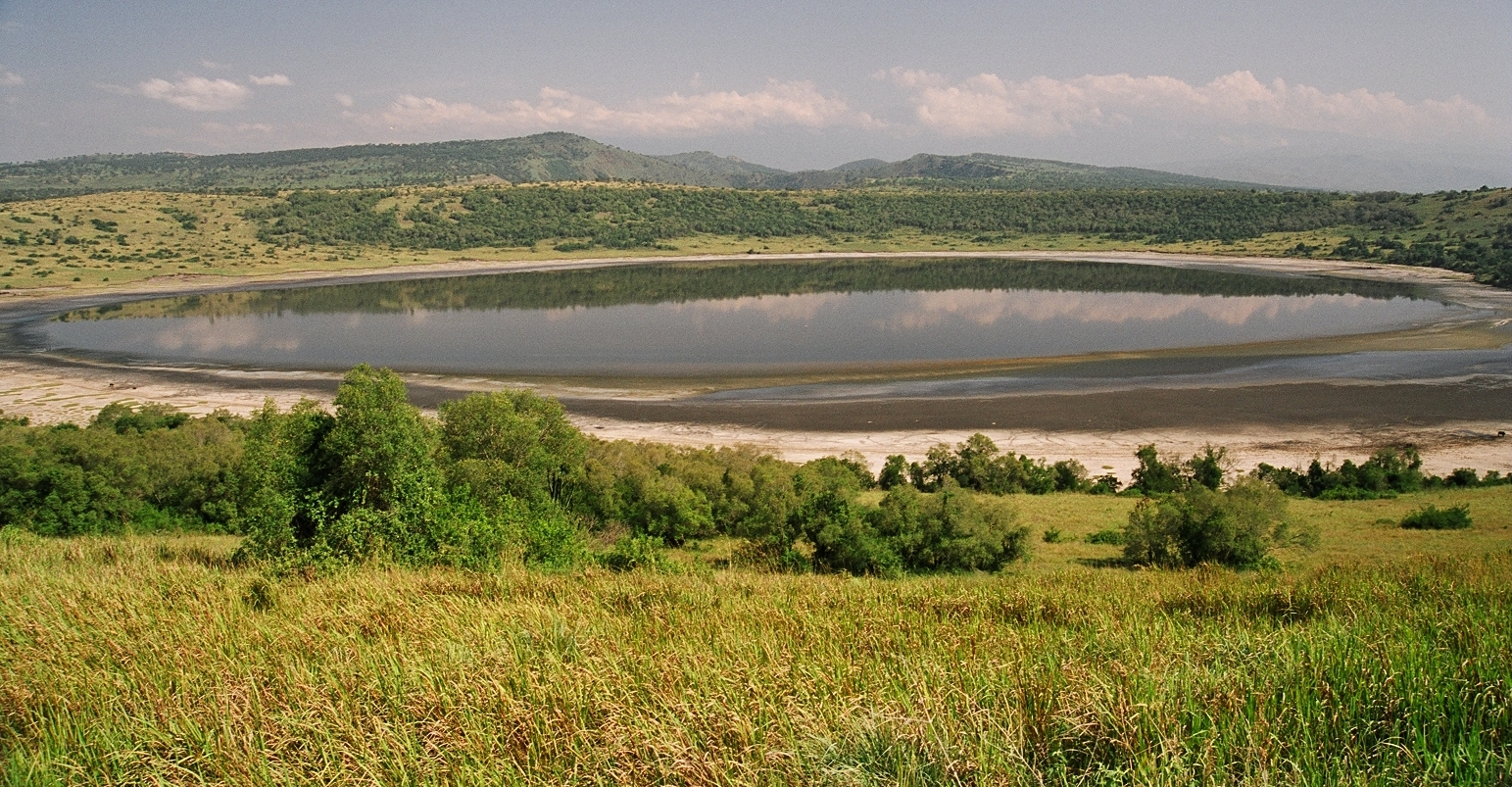
Crater lake in Queen Elizabeth National Park.

== Location and setting ==
The crater area lies along the Albertine Rift, inside the Queen Elizabeth National Park landscape north of Mweya. Dozens of extinct craters occur along the “Crater Drive” route between Kabatoro and Crater gates.

== Geology ==
The Katwe-Kikorongo volcanic field covers about 180 km² and includes about 80 foiditic tuff cones and maars, with several crater floors holding lakes. The crater landforms formed through explosive magma-water interaction (phreatomagmatic activity), producing maar craters and tuff cones. The Global Volcanism Program reports no confirmed Holocene eruptions for the field, and the last eruption remains unknown.

Published summaries describe wide variation in crater size; the largest reach about 3 km in diameter and about 100 m depth.

== Craters and crater lakes ==
Lake Katwe occupies intersecting craters immediately north-east of Lake Edward, forming a shallow water body about 3 km long. Lake Katwe lies at about 885 m elevation and reaches a maximum surface area of about 2.5 km²; reported depth ranges from about 0.4 m to 1.6 m, with a reported circumference of about 9 km.

Munyanyange Crater Lake lies near Katwe town and functions as a seasonal wetland; when full, reported surface area reaches about 40 ha, and surveys treat the site as a long-term bird roost location.

== Salt mining and local livelihoods ==
Salt extraction at Lake Katwe forms a long-running livelihood activity in the Katwe-Kabatoro community. Uganda Wildlife Authority materials describe salt extraction using evaporation pans since the 14th century, supported by local guiding for visitors entering the crater floor.

Engineering and geochemistry literature describes production around the lake through traditional solar evaporation, with over 10,000 salt pans reported around the lake margin, and seasonal harvesting reported from February to April and from July to September. The same source reports a preliminary estimate of about 22.5 million tonnes of crystalline salts in Lake Katwe (citing a 1997 Uganda Development Corporation study), and reports current production at about 15,000 tonnes.

== Ecology and birdlife ==
Soda and saline crater lakes in the Queen Elizabeth National Park landscape support waterbirds, including seasonal congregations of flamingoes reported in Uganda Wildlife Authority visitor information materials. UWA monitoring reports record Lesser Flamingo at Munyanyange (July–August 2019) and note long-term declines in recorded species associated with lake drying and human activity pressures.

== Tourism ==
Crater landscapes form a major scenic feature in Queen Elizabeth National Park. UWA describes a 27 km Crater Drive between Kabatoro and Crater gates, with viewpoints along crater rims and an information centre at the Queen’s Pavilion near Crater Gate. UWA materials also describe guided visits at Lake Katwe to view salt extraction and note migrating lesser flamingo at adjacent Lake Munyanyange between August and November.

== Scientific research ==
Research on Lake Katwe brines describes carbonate-type hypersaline chemistry and mineral salt precipitation during evaporation, with implications for salt quality and processing methods. Geological summaries also document the field as the largest volcanic field in a chain of Western Rift volcanic fields in Uganda, with maars and tuff cones extending between Lakes Edward and George.

Selected craters and crater lakes (starter list)
Name	Type	Notes and sourced details
Lake Katwe	Maar / crater lake	Shallow hypersaline lake; reported elevation 885 m, max area 2.5 km2, depth 0.4–1.6 m, circumference 9 km.
Lake Munyanyange	Crater lake	Seasonal wetland; reported area 40 ha when full; long-term bird roost surveys; Lesser Flamingo recorded in July–August 2019.
Kasenyi Crater Lake	Crater lake	Reported area 24 ha; saline; visited by Lesser Flamingo.
Kikorongo Crater Lake	Crater lake	Reported area about 90 ha; partially saline; bird monitoring records include Lesser Flamingo in July 2019.

== See also ==
- Lake Katwe
- Queen Elizabeth National Park
- Albertine Rift
