= Lake Rwizongo =

Lake in Uganda

Lake Rwizongo is a Ugandan crater lake located in the Rwenzori Mountains. The lake is among several lakes found in the Rwenzori Mountains and these include Lake Nkuruba, Lake Nyabikere, among others.

== Location ==
Lake Rwizongo is located at latitude 0°16'15.90"S and longitude 30°5'20.40"E.

== Flora and fauna ==
The flora and fauna around Lake Rwizongo include hippo, bird species and vegetation characterized by green savannah vegetation.

== See also ==
- Lake Bujuku
- Lake Nyabikere
