= Lake Saka =

Lake in Uganda

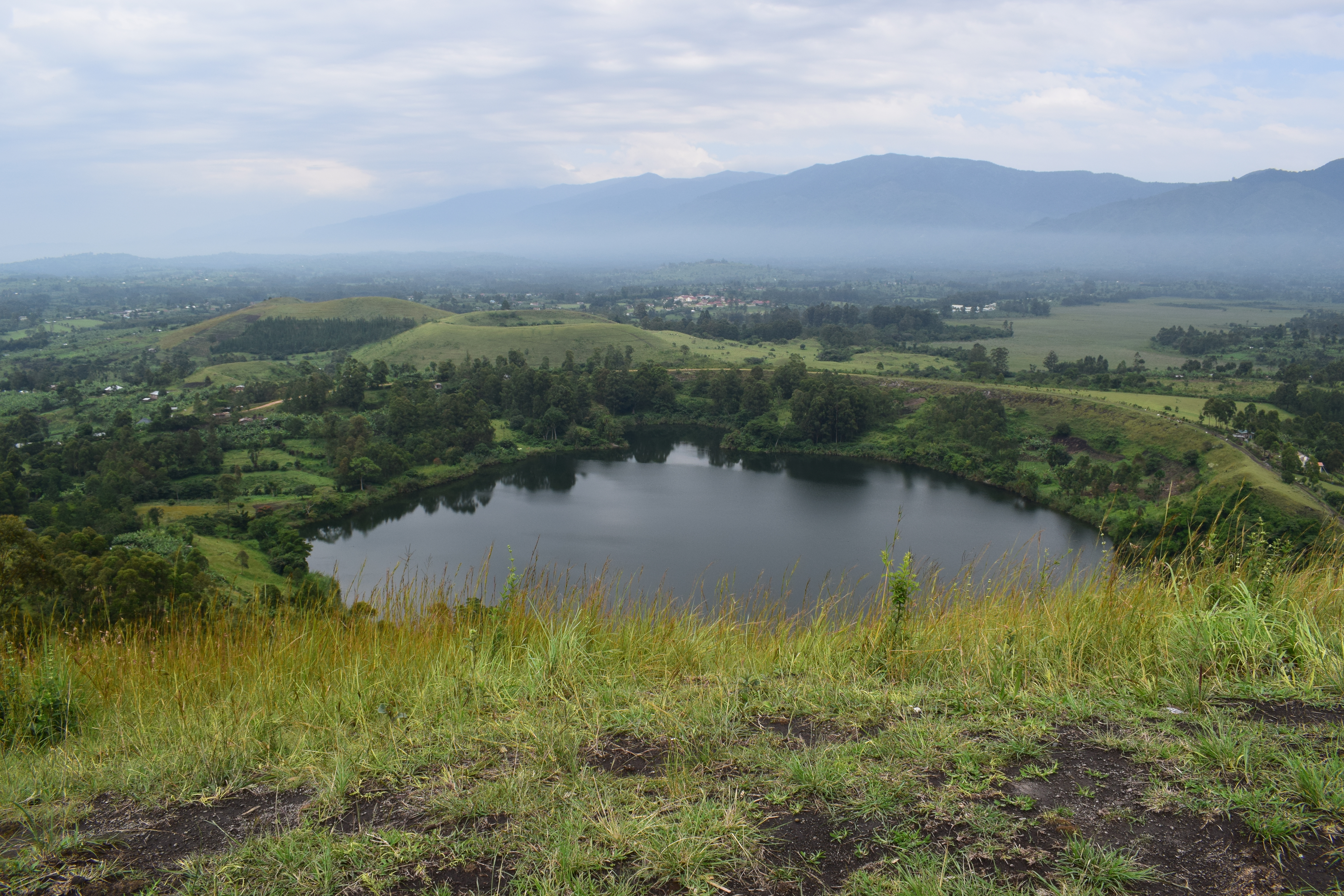
Lake Saka in Kabarole District.

Lake Saka is a Ugandan lake found in Kabarole district, western Uganda. It is at an elevation of 1591 metres above sea Level. The lake acts as a tourist attraction with bird watching and other recreational activities. Lake Saka is one of the crater lakes in Kabarole district along Rwenzori mountain ranges.

== Location ==
Lake Saka is located in Kabarole district in western Uganda at Latitude 0°42'0" N and Longitude 30°13'60" E.

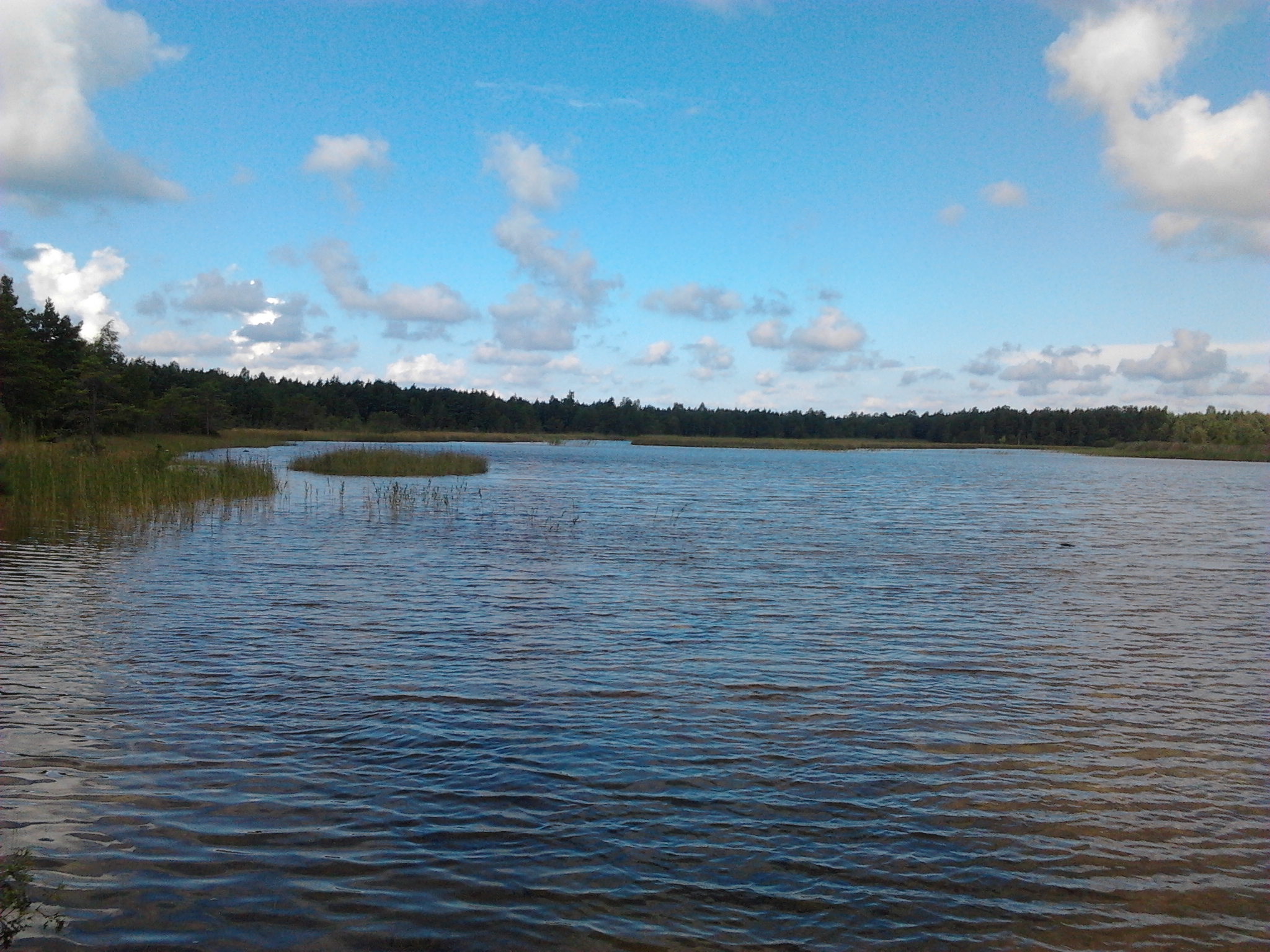
Lake Saka found in Kabarole district.

== See also ==
- Lake Bujuku
- Lake Kyoga
- Lake Nyamusingire
