= Lake Nkugute =

Ugandan lake

Coordinates: 0°19′26″S 30°05′59″E

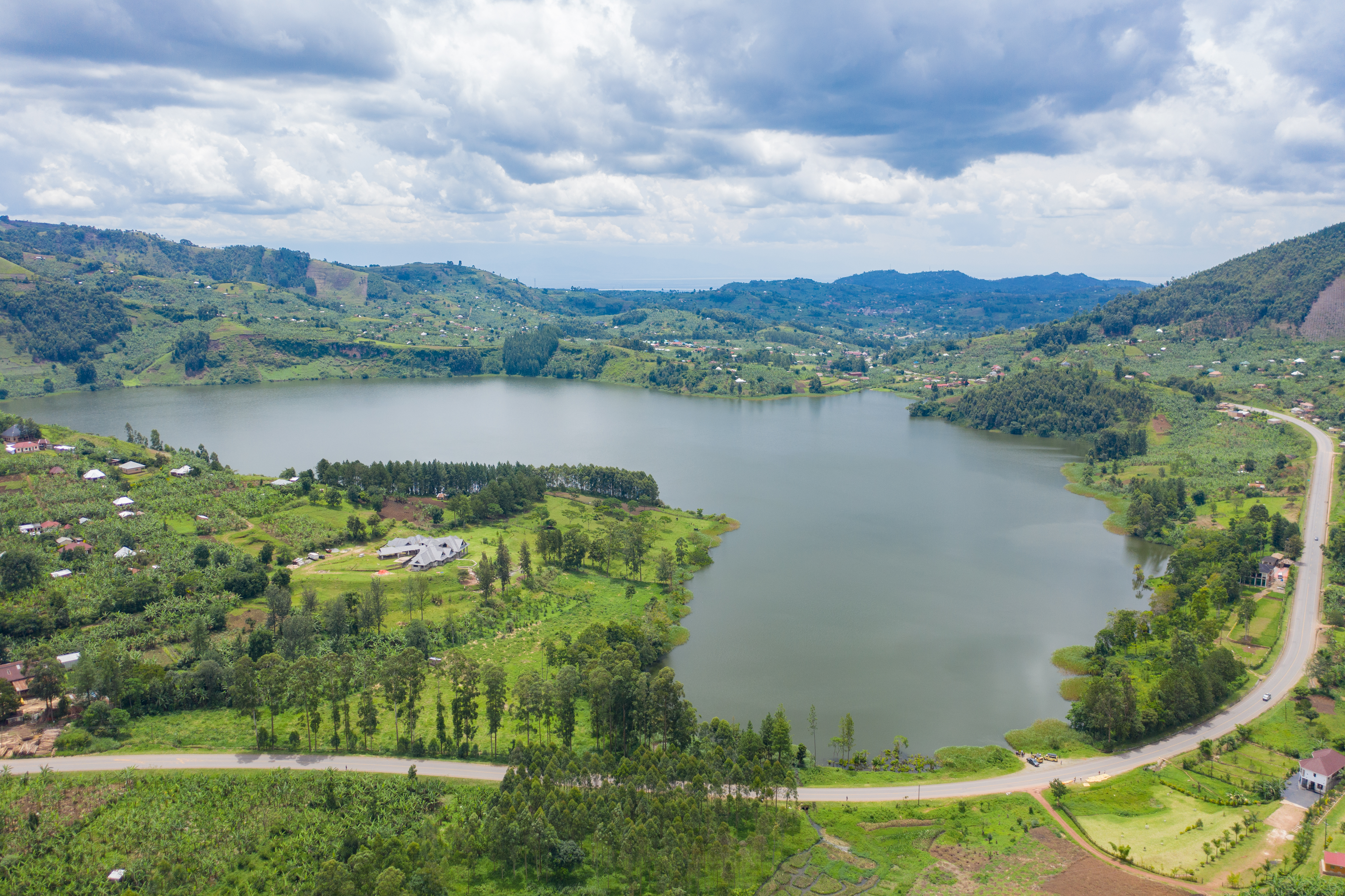
Lake Nkugute

Lake Nkugute, also known as Lake Rutoto, is a lake located in Rubirizi District, Uganda. Situated in the Bunyaruguru volcanic field, the lake is believed to have been formed over 12,000 years ago as a result of volcanic activity. It has become a place of mystery and local folklore, with tales surrounding its origin and behavior.

== Geography and formation ==
Lake Nkugute has an estimated terrain elevation above sea level of 4645 feet. It is shaped in a manner that resembles the map of Africa, leading some locals to refer to it as "Lake Africa." The lake's boundaries can be observed from a hill that borders it.

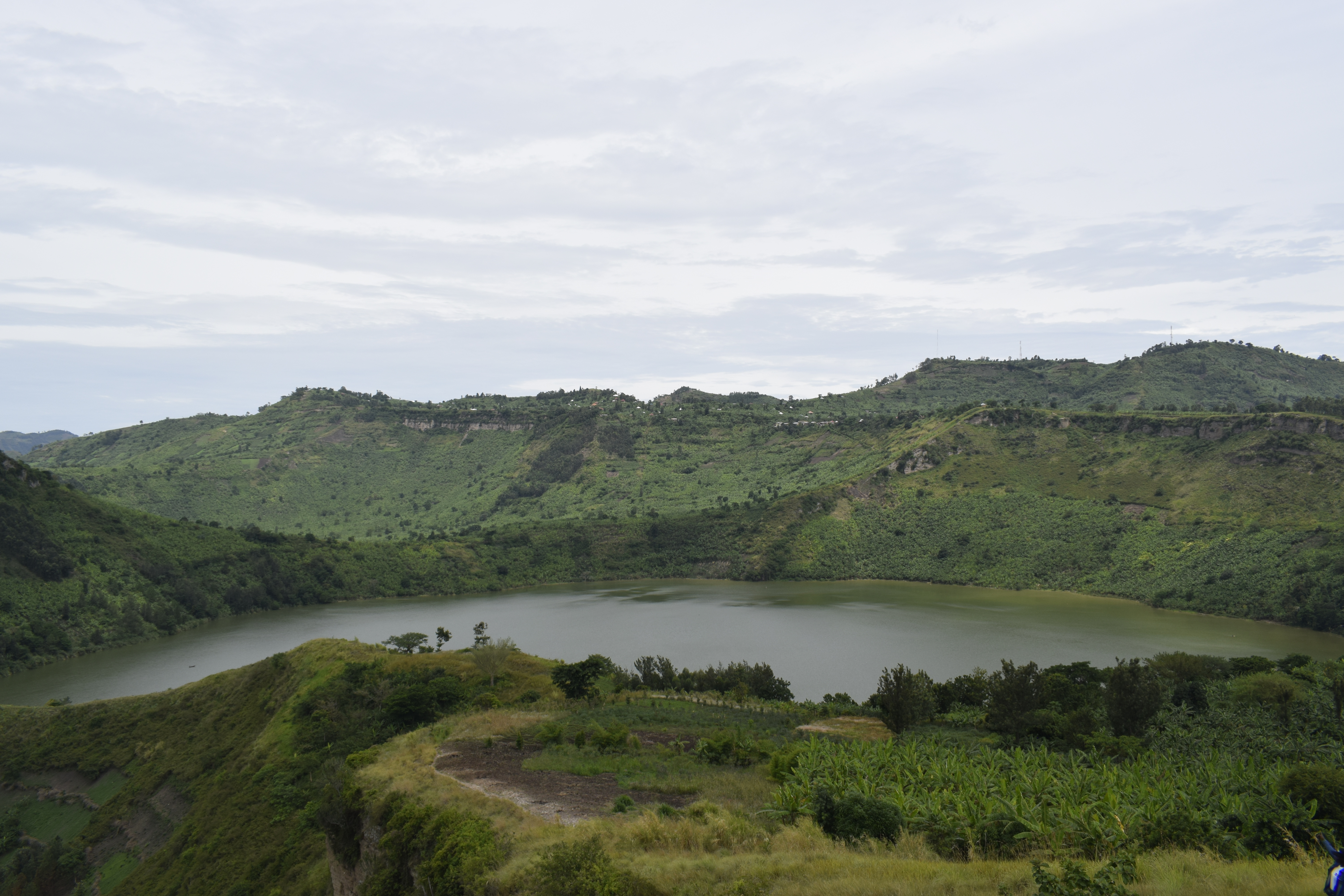
Picture of Lake Nkugute

The lake's formation is attributed to volcanic activity in the Bunyaruguru volcanic field, which left a crater that gradually filled with rainwater over thousands of years.

== Legends and folklore ==
Lake Nkugute has been the subject of mysterious tales and legends shared among the communities residing in the villages surrounding it. According to local folklore, the name "Nkugute" in the Runyaruguru language means "swallow," symbolizing the lake's alleged violent nature and insatiable appetite for humans.

Legends suggest that the lake would swallow a male and female child annually, catching people by surprise. Instances were recounted where children enjoying swimming in the lake would suddenly find themselves helplessly screaming as they appeared to be "swallowed" by the water. Even those attempting to rescue drowning individuals would reportedly face the same fate. These tales have contributed to the lake's reputation as a place of mystery and danger.

== Tourism and local community ==
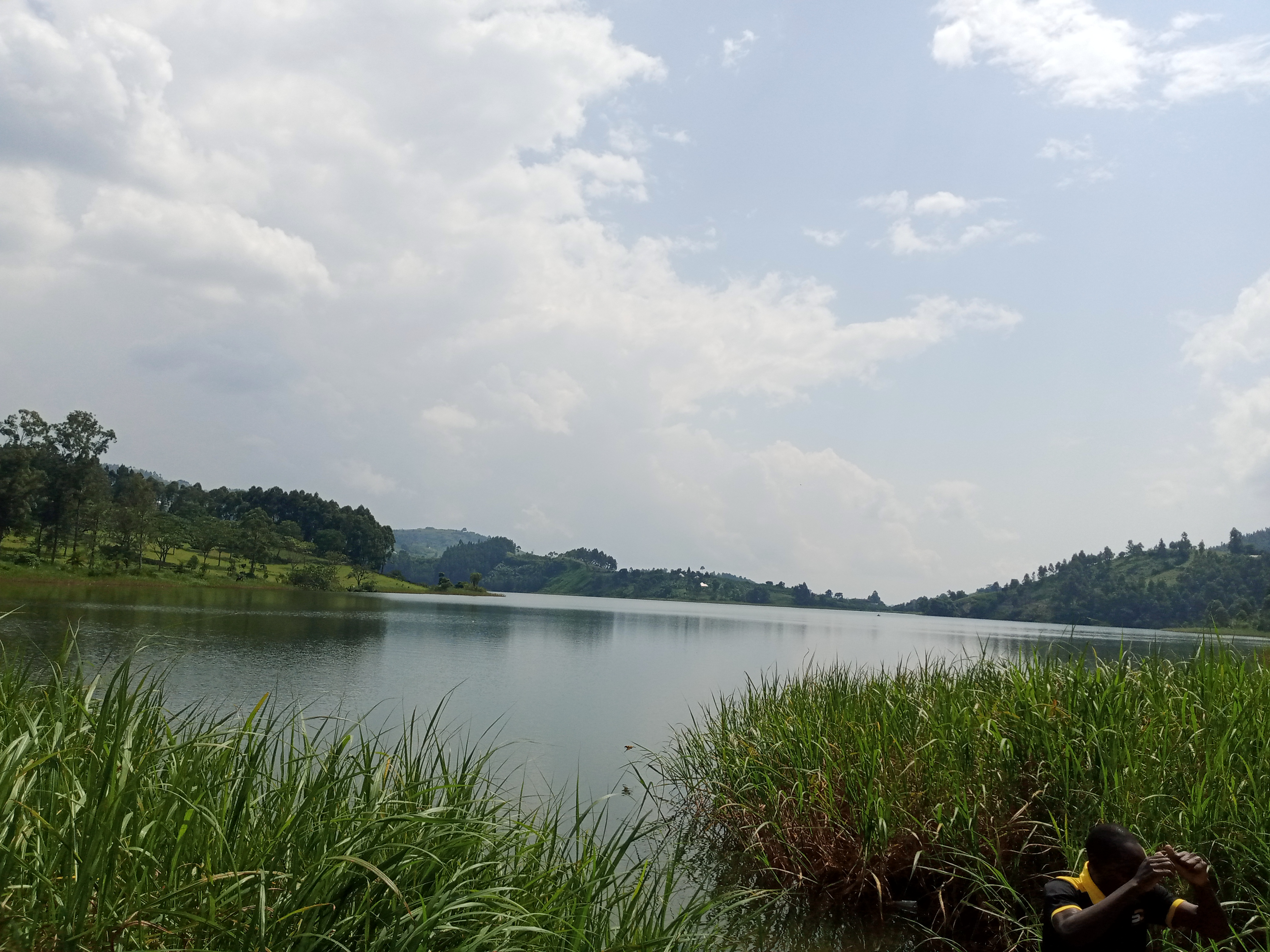
Lake Nkugute also known as Map of Africa Lake.

Lake Nkugute has become a popular destination for tourists, though the local community has had limited benefits from the tourism industry. Tourists often visit to capture the unique shape of the lake and its surrounding scenery. However, the absence of hotels or suitable accommodations in the area has hindered the local community's ability to fully capitalize on tourism.

Efforts have been made to preserve the lake's cleanliness and protect its resources. Local authorities have banned activities such as washing clothes and cars in the lake to ensure the water remains clean. Fishing is not prevalent due to the lack of fish.

The residents of Bunyaruguru, particularly the Banyaruguru tribe, consider Lake Nkugute to be an important part of their heritage. The Banyaruguru people have maintained strong ties to their Baganda origins, and their traditional customs and practices are influenced by both Baganda and Kinyankole cultures.

== See also ==
- List of lakes in Uganda
