= Lake Nyabikere =

Lake in Uganda

Coordinates: 0°29′50″N 30°19′43″E

Lake Nyabikere is a lake located in the Kabarole district of Uganda. The lake is also known as "Frog Lake" since it has a variety of frog species in its waters. It is also a crater lake in the ranges of Mountain Rwenzori in western Uganda and a safari destination in Uganda.

== Flora and fauna ==
The area around Lake Nyabikere has chimpanzees, a variety of bird species, and various tree species and other plant species and acts as a tourist destination for Uganda.

== See also ==
- Lake Bujuku
- Lake Kwania
