= Kibale National Park =

National park in Uganda

- IUCN category II (national park)
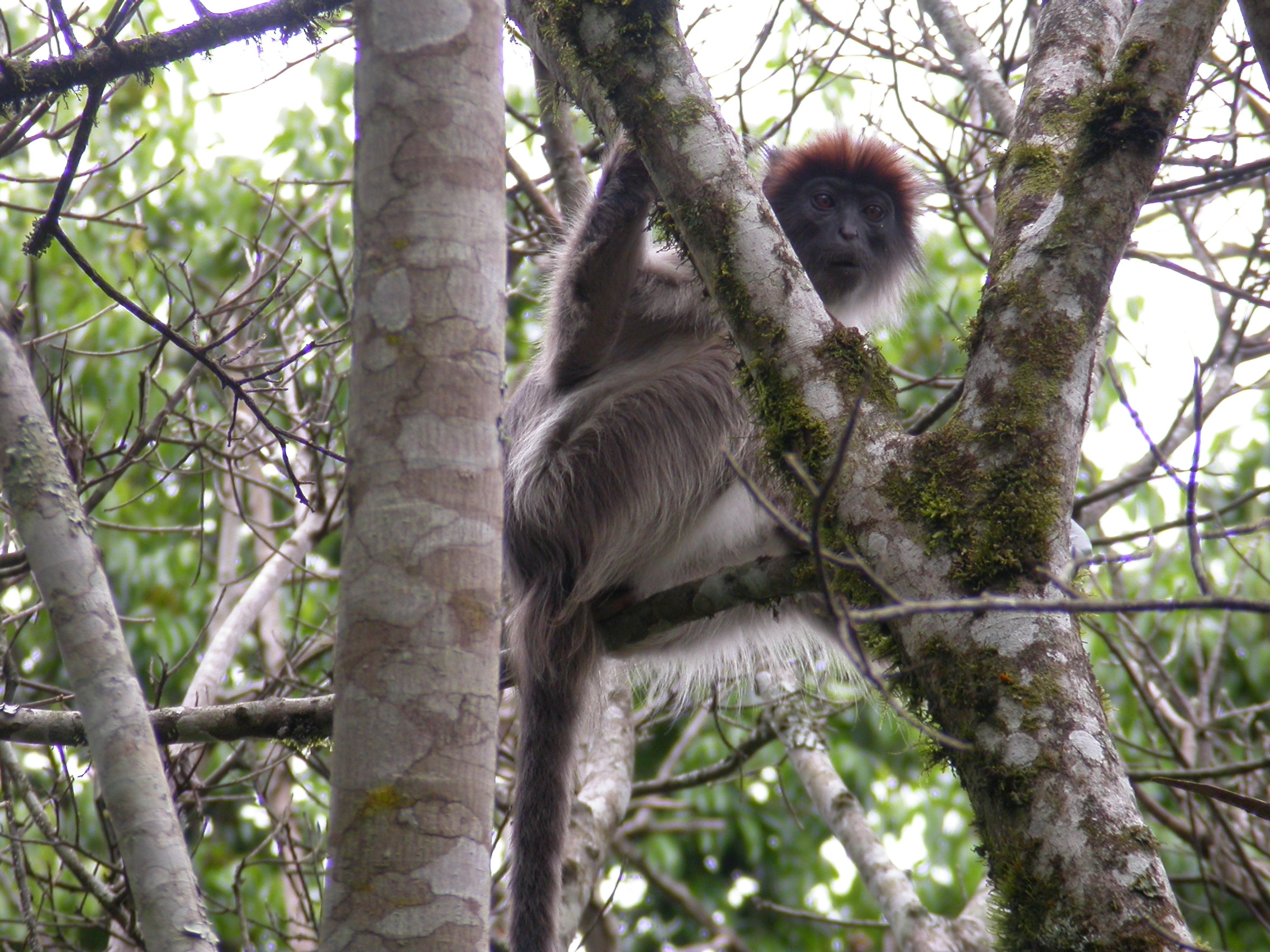
- Ugandan red colobus is one of 13 primate species in Kibale

- Location within Uganda
- Location: Uganda
- Nearest city: Fort Portal
- Coordinates: 00°30′N 30°24′E
- Area: 776 km^{2} (300 sq mi)
- Established: 1993
- Governing body: Ugandan Wildlife Authority

Kibale National Park is a national park in western Uganda, protecting moist evergreen rainforest. It is 766 km^{2} (296 sq mi) in size and ranges between 1,100 m (3,600 ft) and 1,600 m (5,200 ft) in elevation. Despite encompassing primarily moist evergreen forest, it contains a diverse array of landscapes. Kibale is one of the last remaining expanses to contain both lowland and montane forests. In eastern Africa, it sustains the last significant expanse of pre-montane forest.

The park was gazetted in 1932 and formally established in 1993 to protect a large area of forest previously managed as a logged forest reserve. The park forms a continuous forest with Queen Elizabeth National Park. This adjoining of the parks creates a 180 km (110 mi) wildlife corridor. It is an important ecotourism and safari destination, well-known for its population of habituated common chimpanzees and twelve other species of primates. It is also the location of the Makerere University Biological Field Station.

== Locals and the park ==
Two major tribes, the Batooro and Bakiga, inhabit the area around the park. They use the park for food, fuel, and other resources with the help of the Uganda Wildlife Authority. In the last century, the population around the park has increased by sevenfold. This is speculated to be because the park directly brings in revenue for those living around it and the tourism industry creates jobs. In addition, many farmers believe that the soil is better for growing crops year round. This increase in the population has caused the area around the park to be divided and developed or turned into plantations and farmland, and demand for firewood asserts pressure on the park's wildlife habitat. Cutting trees for fuel has already strained many of the forest areas outside Kibale.

== Biodiversity ==
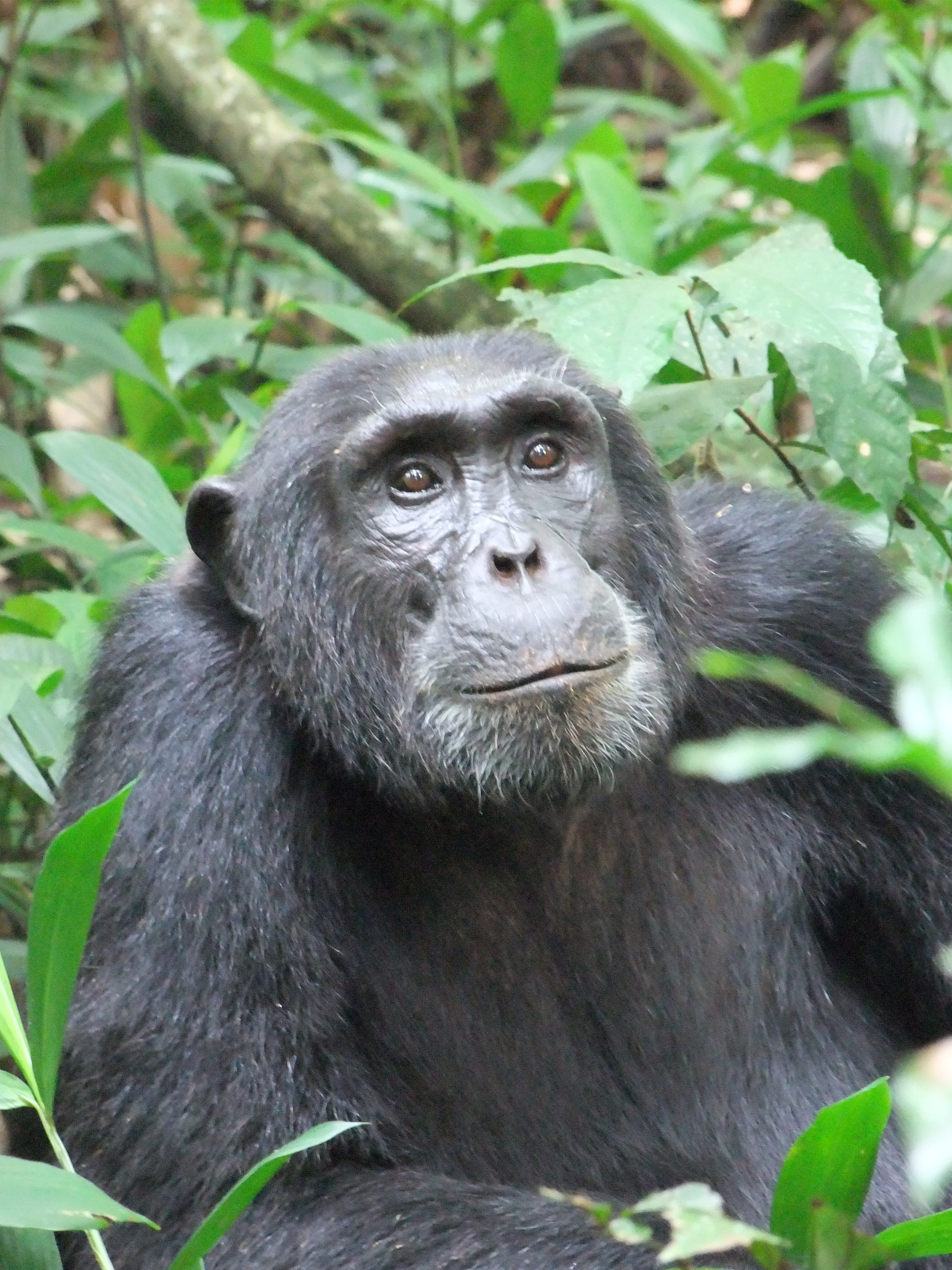
Habituated chimpanzee in Kibale National Park

Kibale National Forest has one of the highest diversity and concentration of primates in Africa. It is home to a large number of endangered chimpanzees, as well as the red colobus monkey (status: Endangered) and the rare L'Hoest's_monkey (Vulnerable).

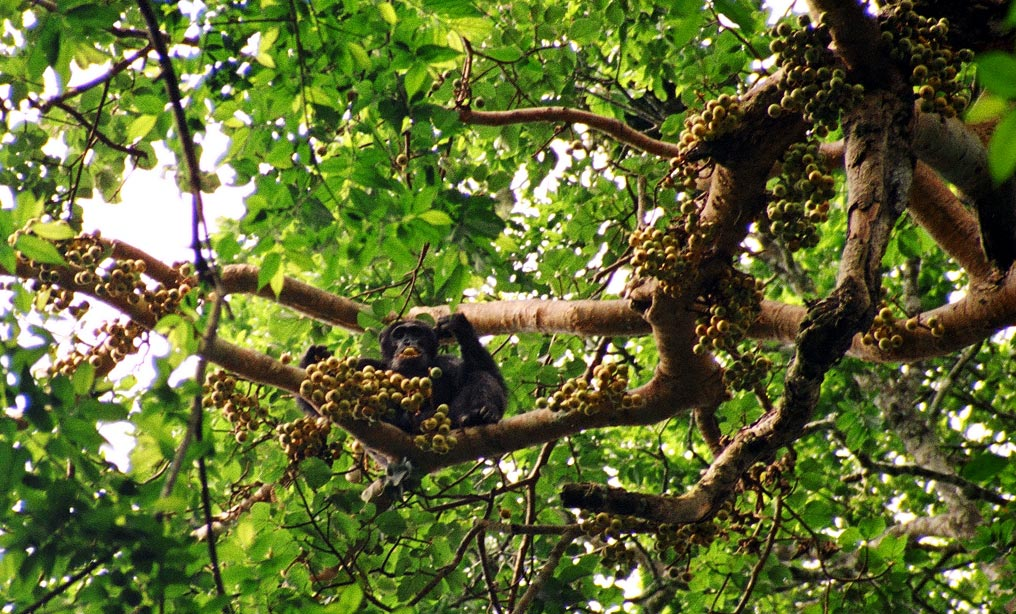
Chimpanzee eating figs in Kibale National Park

There are 13 species of primates in Kibale National Park. The park protects several well-studied habituated communities of common chimpanzee, as well as several species of Central African monkey including the Uganda mangabey (Lophocebus ugandae), the Ugandan red colobus (Procolobus tephrosceles) and the L'Hoest's monkey. Other primates that are found in the park include the mantled guereza (Colobus guereza) and the blue monkey (Cercopithecus mitis). The park's population of elephants travels between the park and Queen Elizabeth National Park. Other terrestrial mammals that are found within Kibale National Park include red and blue duikers, bushbucks, sitatungas, bushpigs, giant forest hogs, common warthogs, and African buffalo. The carnivores that are present include leopards, African golden cats, servals, different mongooses and two species of otter. In addition, lions visit the park on occasion.

Bird life is also prolific. The park boasts 325 species of birds, including the olive long-tailed cuckoo, western tinkerbird, two species of pittas (African and green-breasted) and the grey parrot. The Kibale ground thrush (Geokichla cameronensis kibalensis) is endemic to Kibale National Park.

=== Primates ===
Kibale National Forest has some of the highest abundances of species of primates in the area. There are many species of primates and these species persist in the less disturbed areas of the forest in their natural habitats. There are disturbances that are hindering some of these species. Logging effects have been studied specifically by a few people. Most studies find that logging seems to be having a negative effect on the species but there are some contradictions. Some species of primates occur less frequently in logged areas but others were unaffected. Degraded lands occur when land is cleared for agriculture and then abandoned after a few years. These lands are coming back at different rates and some are showing no possibility of re-growth. The effect these lands have on primates is still slightly unknown but some studies have started weeding out answers. Most primates are evenly distributed throughout the entire forest, whether there was agriculture encroachment or not. Different species have different diets and many of the species are folivorous. One study actually found that mantled guerezas (Colobus guereza) eat younger leaves over older leaves (this is thought to happen because the leaves have more protein and are easier to digest).

== Flora ==
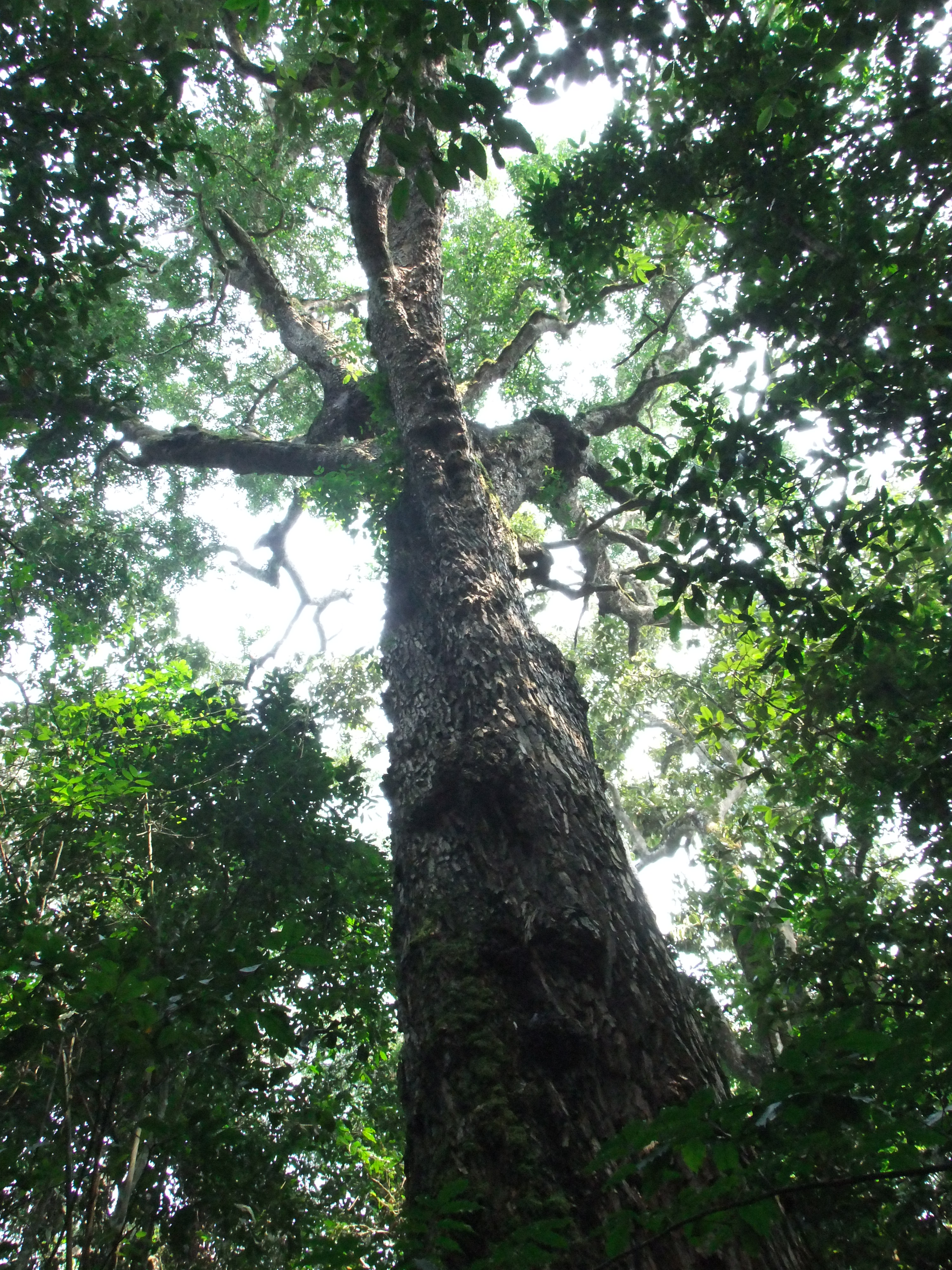
Kibale Forest National Park

There are approximately 229 species of trees found within the moist tropical forests of the park. Some endangered timber species of trees include Cordia millenii, Entandrophragma angolense, and Lovoa swynnertonii. The forest understory is dominated by shade-tolerant shrubs and herbs, which include Palisota schweinfurthii and Pollia condensata, in addition to ferns and broad leaf grasses.

== Forest management ==
Many studies have been conducted within the park to assess the factors influencing forest regeneration and forest management techniques. One such study's results suggested that forest restoration could be achieved through preventing fires within the park and allowing natural succession to occur so that the grasslands formed due to human activity could naturally regenerate to forests. The results showed that plots within the park that had the longest history of fire exclusion and the highest tree species diversity. Tree species that require animal dispersal of their seeds were far more abundant than non-animal dispersed species in the plot with the longest duration of fire exclusion. This suggests that seed dispersing animals were also more abundant in areas where fire was excluded. Lastly, the presence of seed dispersers and animal dispersed species of trees in some grassland plots suggest that suppressing fire and allowing natural seed dispersal to occur can encourage forest regeneration. Another study evaluated the use of exotic pine and cypress tree plantations as a forest restoration technique within the park. This study showed a high level of natural regeneration of indigenous trees within pine plantations most likely due to the use of these plantations by seed dispersing animals such as redtail monkeys, chimpanzees, duikers, and bushpigs, all of which were sited or tracked within the plantations.

=== Wild coffee project ===
Robusta coffee grows natively in the Kibale forest area. From 1999 to 2002 an effort was made to commercialize this coffee as a premium consumer brand, emulating and extending the success of shade grown in Central America. Revenue from the coffee production was intended to finance conservation management activities.

Initial funding for project development came from USAID. The project was implemented with funding from the Ford Foundation and $750,000 from the World Bank Global Environment Facility. The project had initial success in setting up local production standards and procedures and control infrastructure. Initially it was led by the Uganda Coffee Trade Federation, until the independent US-based non-profit Kibale Forest Foundation was created to take over the project. Sustainable annual yield was estimated at 680 kg (1,500 lb). Organic certification was delivered by the Swedish KRAV labeling firm. It was subsequently discovered that there was no demand for the product, as the robusta variety is perceived as inferior to arabica coffee typically demanded by the premium market. Various blending schemes were turned down by coffee distributors. Project leaders estimated that $800,000 in marketing expenditure would be required to create demand.
