= Maramagambo Forest =

Forest in Uganda

- Interactive map of Maramagambo Forest
- Location: Bushenyi District, Western Region, Uganda
- Nearest city: Bushenyi
- Governing body: Uganda Wildlife Authority; National Forestry Authority

Maramagambo Forest is located in Bushenyi district in south western region of Uganda. It adjoins the Queen Elizabeth National Park to the north. It is jointly managed by the Uganda Wildlife Authority and the National Forestry Authority.

Within the forest is a bat cave which has been the source of virulent diseases. In 1987, a tourist from the Netherlands was exposed to Marburg virus present in the bats that live in the volcanic tube cave and developed Marburg virus disease. Following this outbreak, the cave was closed until the construction of a viewing platform with support from the U.S. Centers for Disease Control and Prevention.

The forest is bordered by two crater lakes, Lake Kyasanduka and Lake Nyamasingiri. Many chimpanzees, red-tailed monkeys, and Bates's pygmy antelopes can be found here.

In 2023, the government of Uganda made a move to convert the forest into a national park because of rumours of illegal deforestation and lumbering, and for wildlife protection.

== Geography ==
Maramagambo Forest covers part of Queen Elizabeth National park and stretches all the way from Kichwamba escarpments to Lake Edward. Its ecosystem is connected to the rift valley. It lies along the following coordinates 0.3575°S, 29.9278°E with an area coverage of 750km².

== Wildlife ==
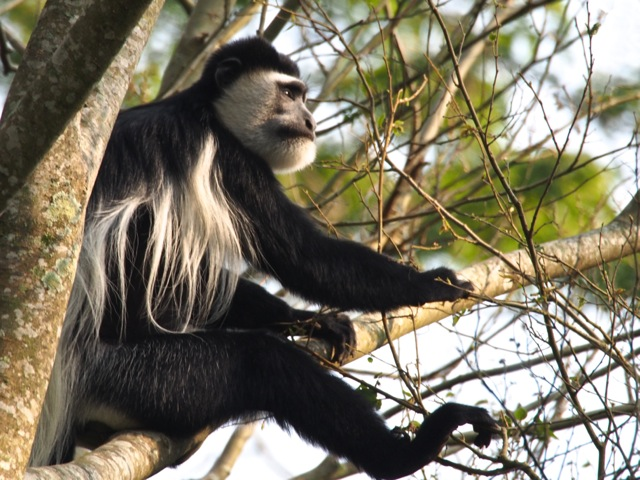
Black and White Colobus Monkey found in Maramagambo Forest

A medium-altitude rain forest, Maramagambo supports a rich selection of birds, along with forest mammals, including a population of at least 300 chimpanzees, several types of monkey, and the likes of potto, giant forest hog, and yellow-backed duiker.

== Tourism ==
Maramagambo forest is known for its bat caves and python caves, these house bats and pythons respectively. It is also known for magnificent crater lakes especially the Blue lake also known as Kilimanjovu. It favors nature walks & hiking, primate encounters and cultural experiences from the near by villages via different acts such as local life, farms, traditional healers.

== See also ==
- Central Forest Reserves of Uganda
- Queen Elizabeth National Park
- Protected areas of Uganda
- Kalinzu forest reserve
- Kigezi wildlife reserve
