= Lake Kyema =

Lake in Uganda

Coordinates: 0°15′20″S 30°07′01″E

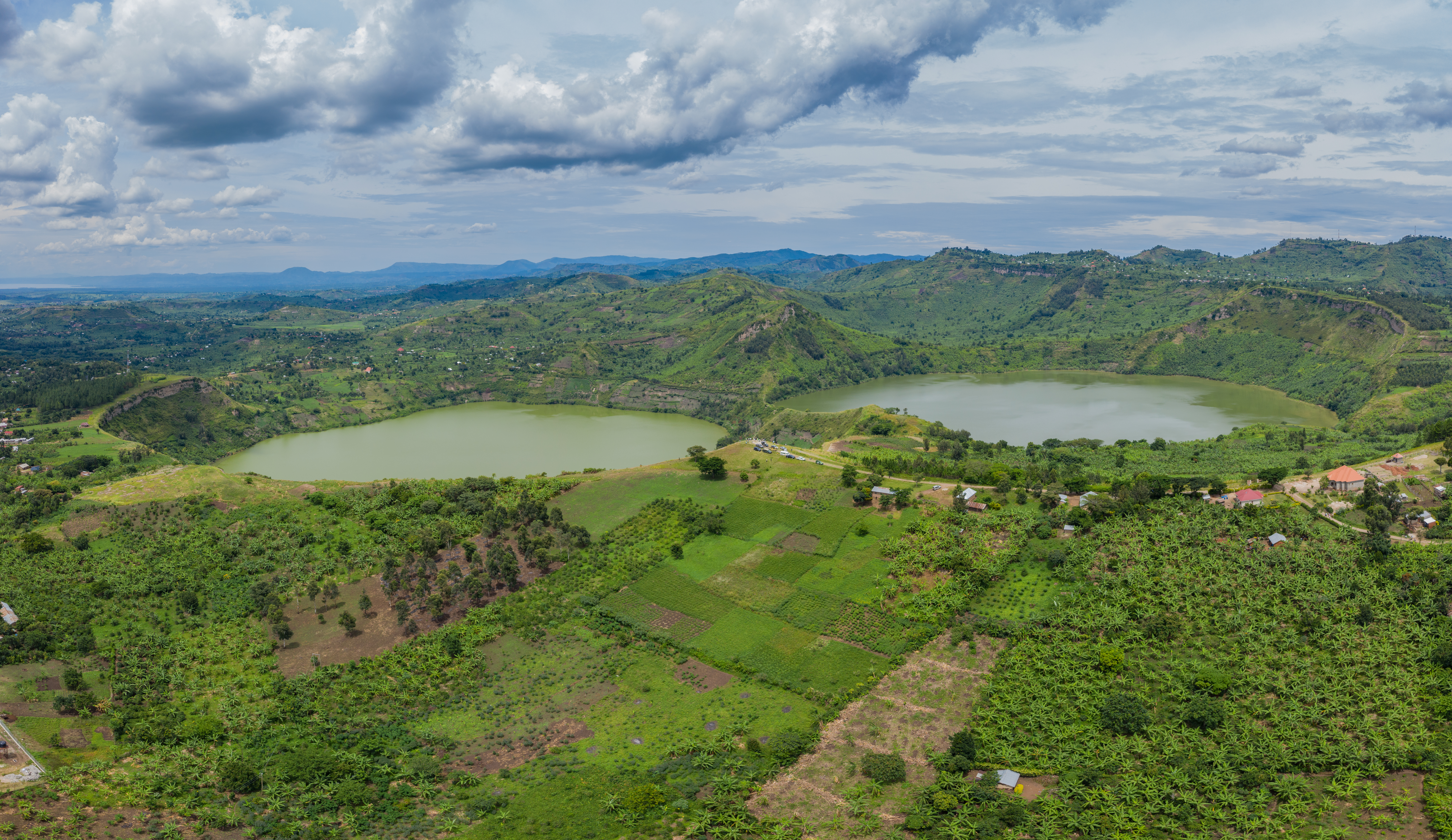
Twin crater lakes Kyema and Kamweru

Lake Kyema, or Lake Chema, is a Ugandan crater lake in Rubirizi District, Western Uganda. The lake has a nearby twin, called Lake Kamweru, whose waters are green compared to Lake Kyema, whose waters are much clearer. It is a protected area that is managed by Ministry of Tourism, Wildlife and Antiquities and Uganda Wildlife Authority. It is one of the over 50 crater lakes in the Rwenzori Mountain ranges.
