= Lake Nyaguo =

Ugandan lake

- Location within Uganda
- Location: Pallisa District
- Coordinates: 1°19′29″N 33°43′22″E
- Basin countries: Uganda

Lake Nyaguo is a Ugandan lake in Pallisa district situated in eastern Uganda. It is one of the lakes within lake Kyoga basin. Lake Nyaguo is a protected area where activities like fishing is restricted to protect fish species in the lake. Its elevation above sea level is estimated to be 1043 metres. The lake acts as a habitat for endangered fish and bird species.

== See also ==
- Lake Bujuku
