= Queen Elizabeth National Park =

National park in Uganda

- IUCN category II (national park)
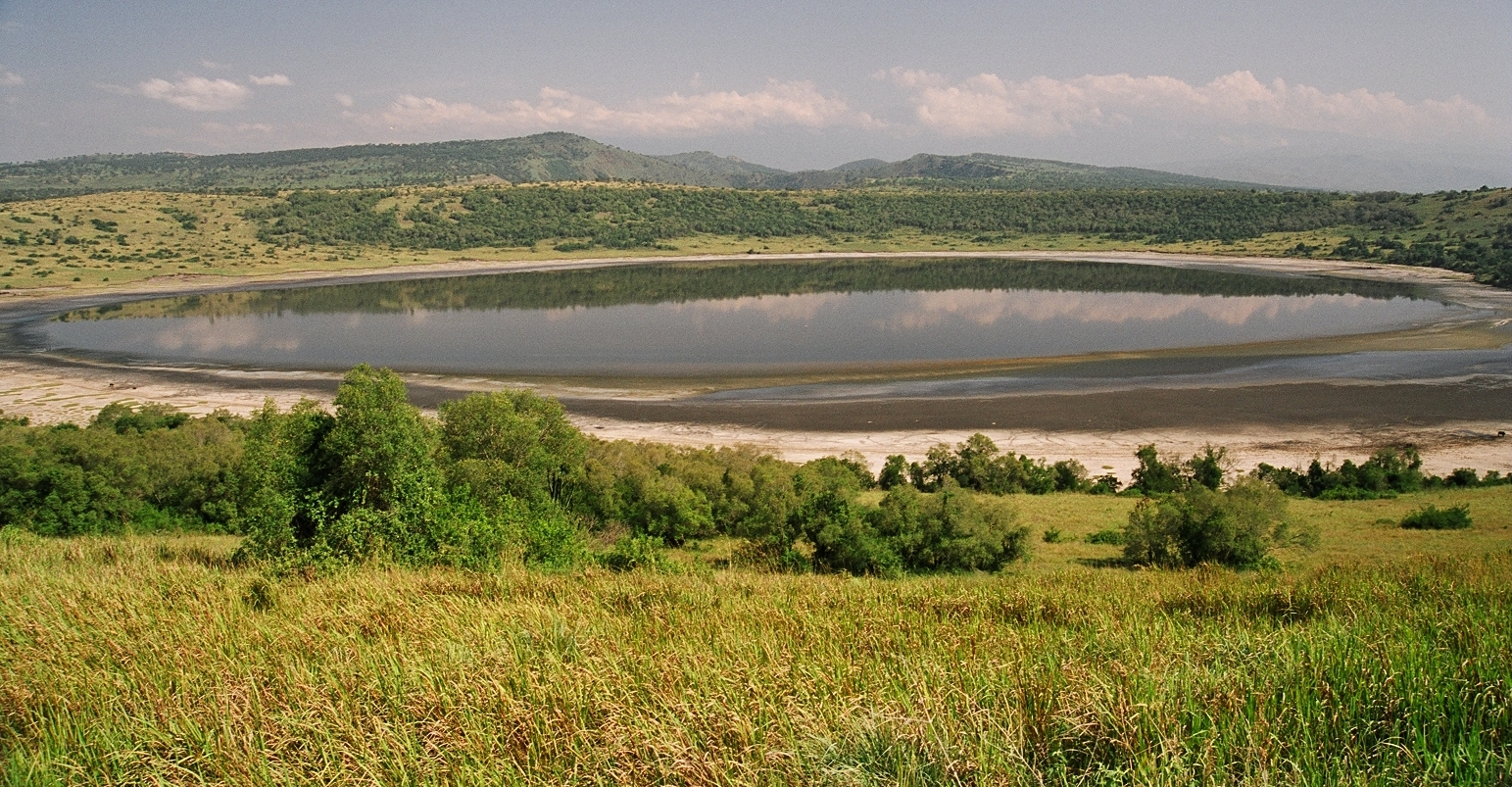
- Crater Lake

- Location within Uganda
- Location: Uganda
- Nearest city: Kasese
- Coordinates: 00°08′14″S 30°02′28″E
- Area: 1,978 km^{2} (764 sq mi)
- Established: 1952
- Governing body: Ugandan Wildlife Authority

Queen Elizabeth National Park is a national park in the Western Region of Uganda.

== Location ==
Queen Elizabeth National Park spans the districts of Kasese, Kamwenge, Rubirizi, and Rukungiri. It adjoins Kyambura Game Reserve to the east, which itself adjoins the Kigezi Game Reserve including the Maramagambo Forest and thus the Kibale National Park to the northeast. Virunga National Park in the Democratic Republic of the Congo lies across the border to the west. Together, these protected places completely encircle Lake Edward. The Rwenzori Mountains National Park in Uganda lies not far to the northwest. During the 1970s and 1980s, Western conservationists usually referred to the park as Rwenzori National Park.

== History ==
In 1921, a rinderpest epidemic and sleeping sickness among the indigenous inhabitants of the region, the pastoralist Songora people, caused great death and emigration from the region. The epidemic was falsely believed to be caused by the colonial government under the guise of a livestock vaccination campaign. The game increased, and the British colonial government decided to evict the remaining people from perhaps 90% of their lands to create game reserves. Their homes were torched and their livestock slaughtered, causing them to flee across the border and seek refuge in what is now the Democratic Republic of the Congo.

The park was founded in 1952 as Kazinga National Park by combining the Lake George and Lake Edward Game Reserves. It was renamed two years later to commemorate a visit by Queen Elizabeth II, and the last remaining communal grazing rights of the Songora herders were rescinded, causing thousands more to move across the border with their herds into Virunga National Park, most only beginning to return after 1964 due to the strife caused by the Mulele rebellion there.

In 2006 the Basongora were forced to flee across the border from the DRC, settling in the park to the north of Lake Edward with their livestock. Attacks by predators on their property, and lack of compensation when their animals are killed, caused them to leave out carcasses laced with poison out to solve the problem, killing off eleven lions in 2018, among numerous incidents. This caused those in the international tourism and conservation industry to refer to the situation as "national disaster". Previously, poachers killed six elephants in the park in 2015, triggering both anger and frustration within the Ugandan conservation community.

== Overview ==
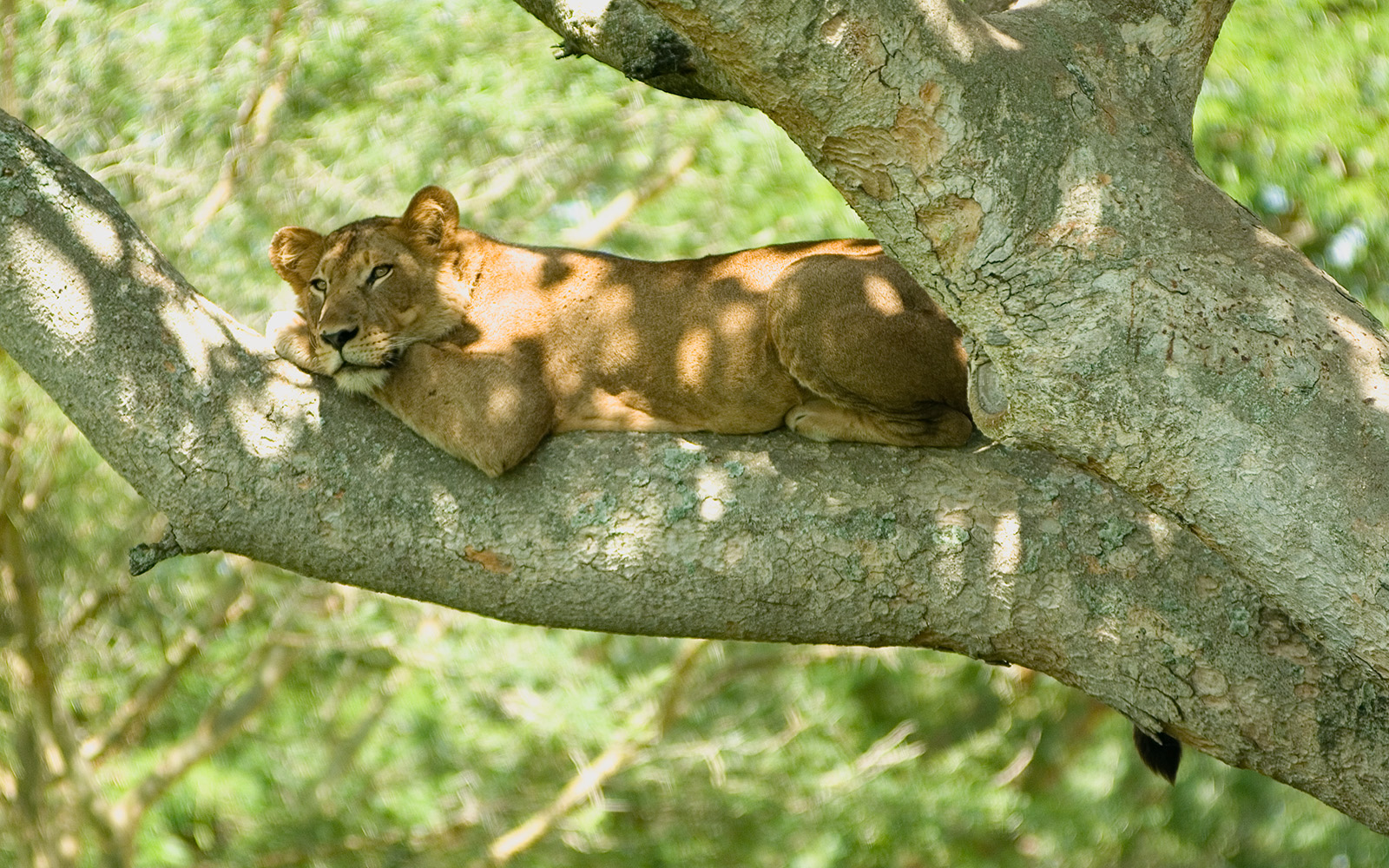
A lioness in Ishasha Sector

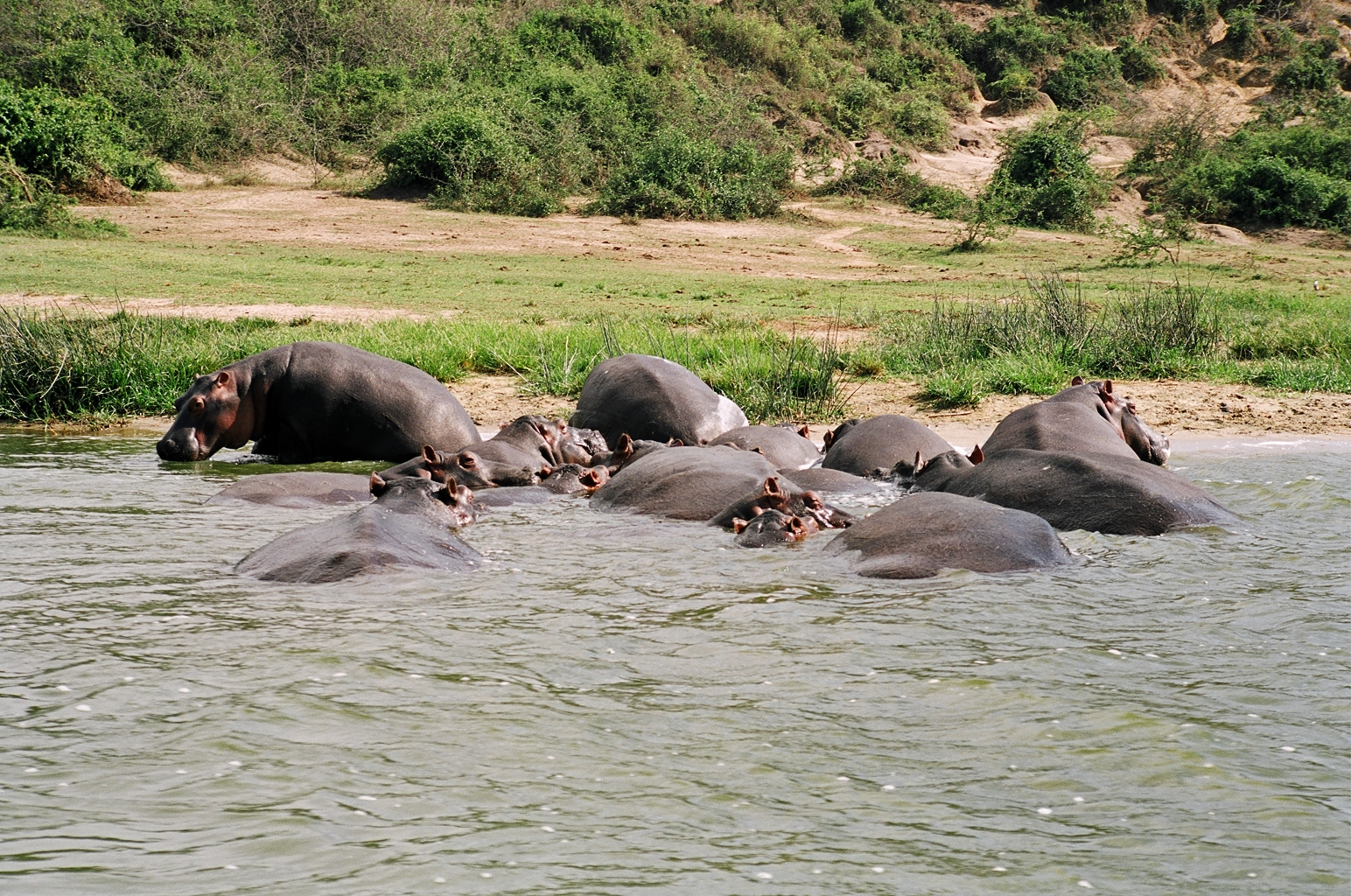
Hippopotamuses in the Kazinga Channel of Queen Elizabeth National Park

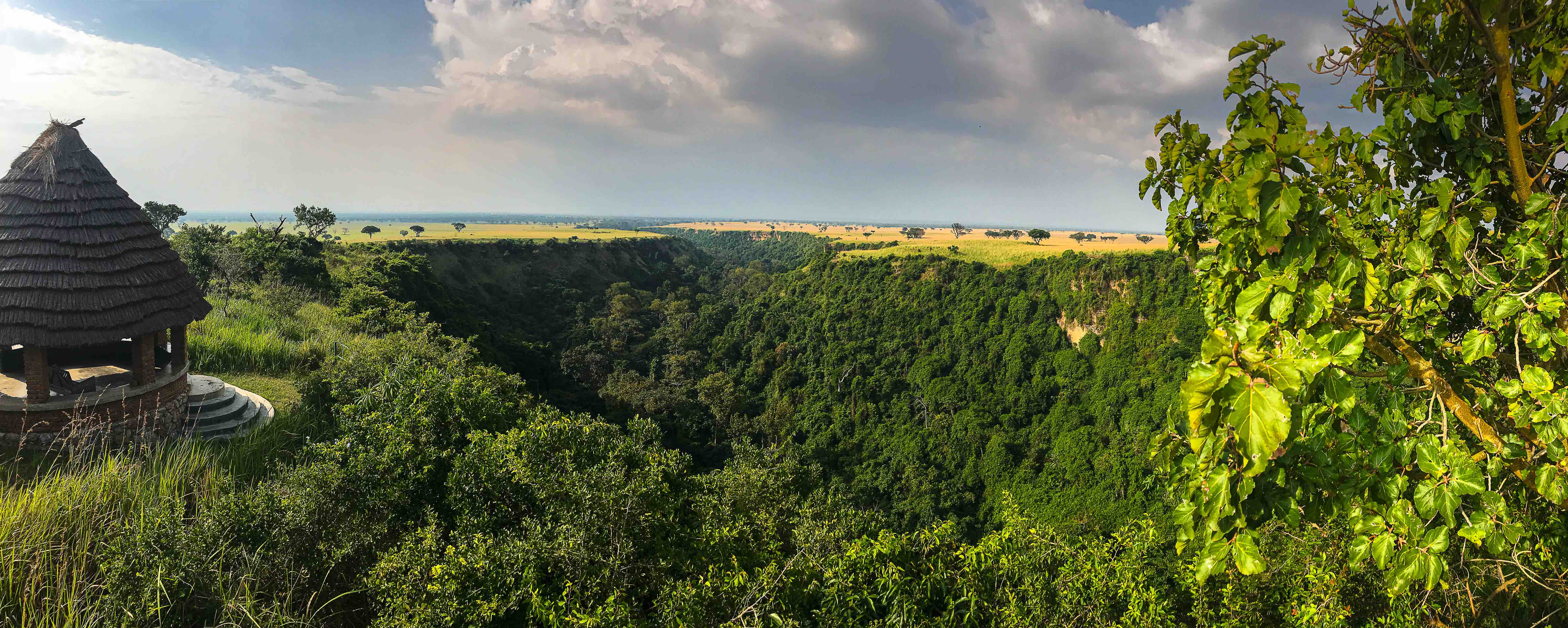
Kyambura Gorge in Queen Elizabeth National Park

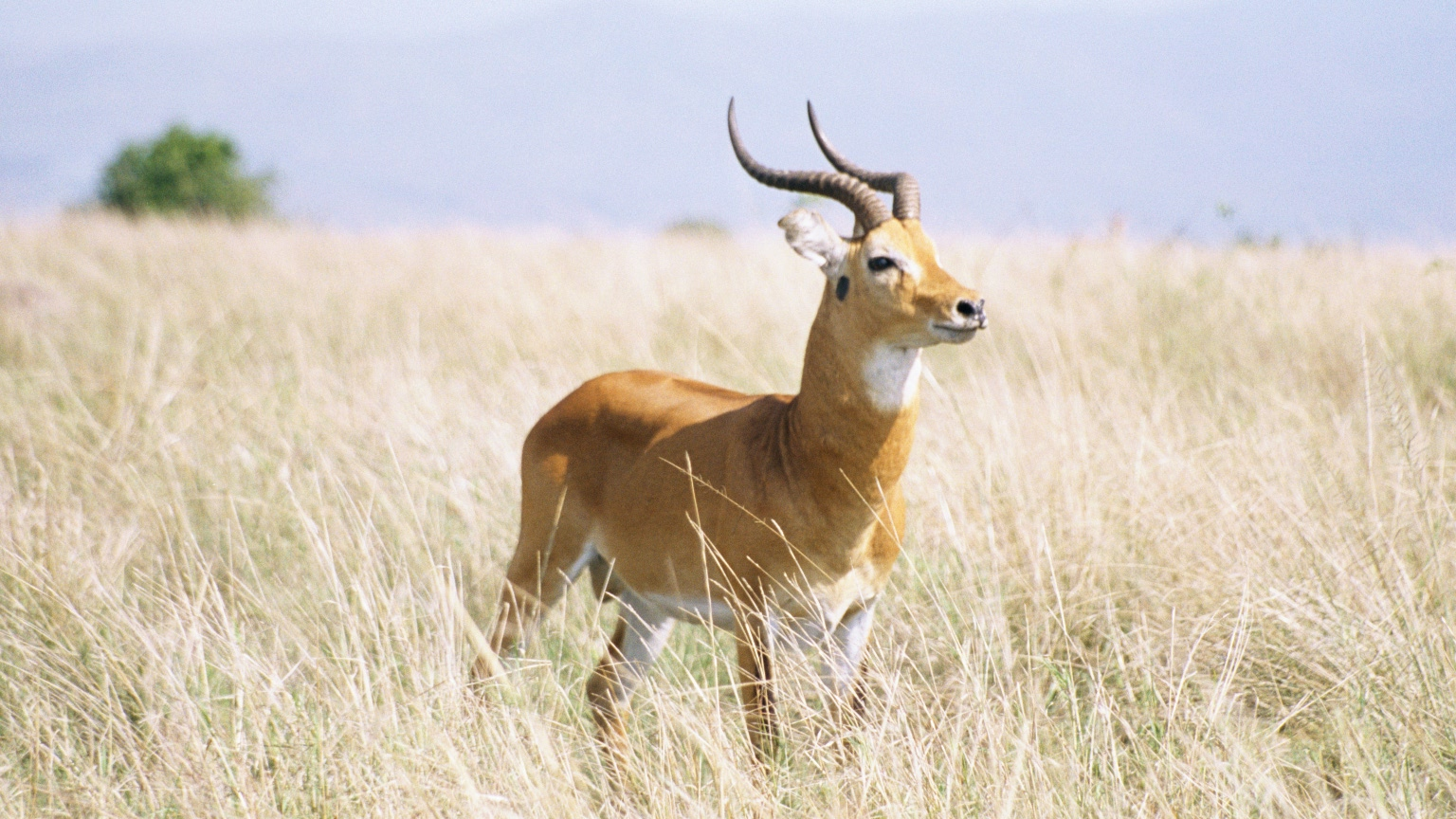
Uganda Kob in Queen Elizabeth National Park

Queen Elizabeth National Park occupies an estimated 1,978 km^{2} (764 sq mi). It is known for its abundant wildlife, including African elephant, African buffalo, Ugandan kob, hippopotamus, topi, waterbuck, warthog, giant forest hog, Nile crocodile, leopard, spotted hyena, chimpanzee and lion. Overall, the park is home to 95 mammal species and over 600 bird species. The area around Ishasha in Rukungiri District is famous for its tree-climbing lions, whose males often sport black manes. In 2020, Uganda Wildlife Authority executive director Samuel John Mwandha stated that the wildlife in park has been increasing in the last five years.

QENP, together with the adjacent Virunga National Park, was designated as a 'lion conservation unit' by the IUCN in 2006. The area is also considered a potential lion stronghold in Central Africa, if poaching is curbed and prey species are allowed to recover. The resident lion population (including hyenas and leopards) are actively monitored by the Uganda Carnivore Program and the Uganda Wildlife Authority through the use of radio collars and other conservation initiatives.

The park is also famous for its volcanic features, including volcanic cones and deep craters, many with crater lakes, such as the Katwe craters, from which salt is extracted.

Services in the park include a telecenter run by Conservation Through Public Health.

== Twinning ==
QENP and the Queen Elizabeth Country Park in England are twinned in a project of "cultural exchange, mutual support and has its main emphasis on supporting Conservation through working closely with and empowering local communities".

== See also ==
- Lake Kibwera
- Rukungiri
- List of Protected Areas of Uganda
