= Bunyaruguru =

Region in Uganda

- Former Kingdom/County
- Location in Uganda
- Coordinates: 0°30′S 30°00′E
- Country: Uganda
- Region: Western Uganda
- District: Rubirizi District
- Time zone: UTC+3 (EAT)

Bunyaruguru is a region in western Uganda that was an independent kingdom before becoming part of the British colonial administration and later modern Uganda. The area became part of the British Ankole protectorate in 1901, marking the end of its independence as a traditional kingdom.

Today, Bunyaruguru exists as one of two counties within Rubirizi District, alongside Katerera County. Rubirizi District was carved out of Bushenyi District in July 2010, with the district headquarters located in Rubirizi town. The district is composed of nine sub-counties and two town councils, with Bunyaruguru County encompassing several of these administrative units.

== Geography and natural features ==
The area is part of the Bunyaruguru (also known as Kichwambe) volcanic field, which straddles the equator along the eastern side of the Western Rift Valley, south of Lake George.

The volcanic field contains more than 130 maars, of which 27 contain lakes. The geological formations include friable calcareous volcanic tuffs that are interbedded with various sedimentary layers.

== Administrative structure ==
Bunyaruguru County is part of Rubirizi District, which is bordered by Kasese District to the north, Kitagwenda District to the northeast, Ibanda District to the east, Buhweju District to the southeast, Bushenyi District to the south, Rukungiri District to the southwest, and the Democratic Republic of the Congo to the west.
