= Lake Chahafi =

Lake in Uganda

Coordinates: 1°20′46″S 29°46′23″E

Lake Chahafi is a crater lake located in Kisoro district in southwestern Uganda.

The lake brings Uganda foreign exchange earnings through tourism, contributing to economic development. The lake is situated in a region called "Switzerland of Uganda" given its nature encompassing the mountain ranges of Rwenzori with a Mediterranean climate.
