= Lake Bujuku =

Lake in Uganda

Coordinates: 0°22′36″N 29°53′36″E

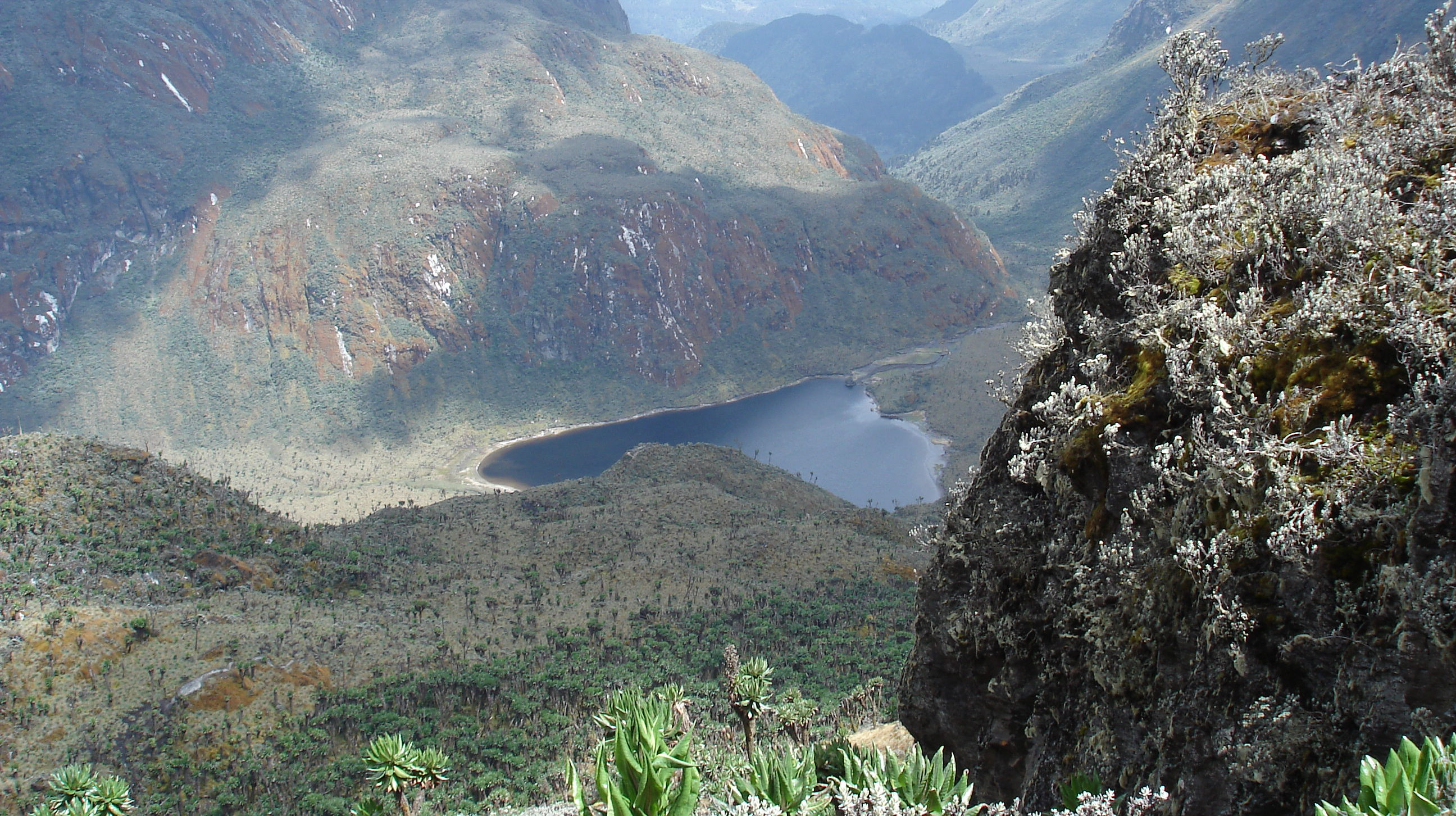
Lake Bujuku

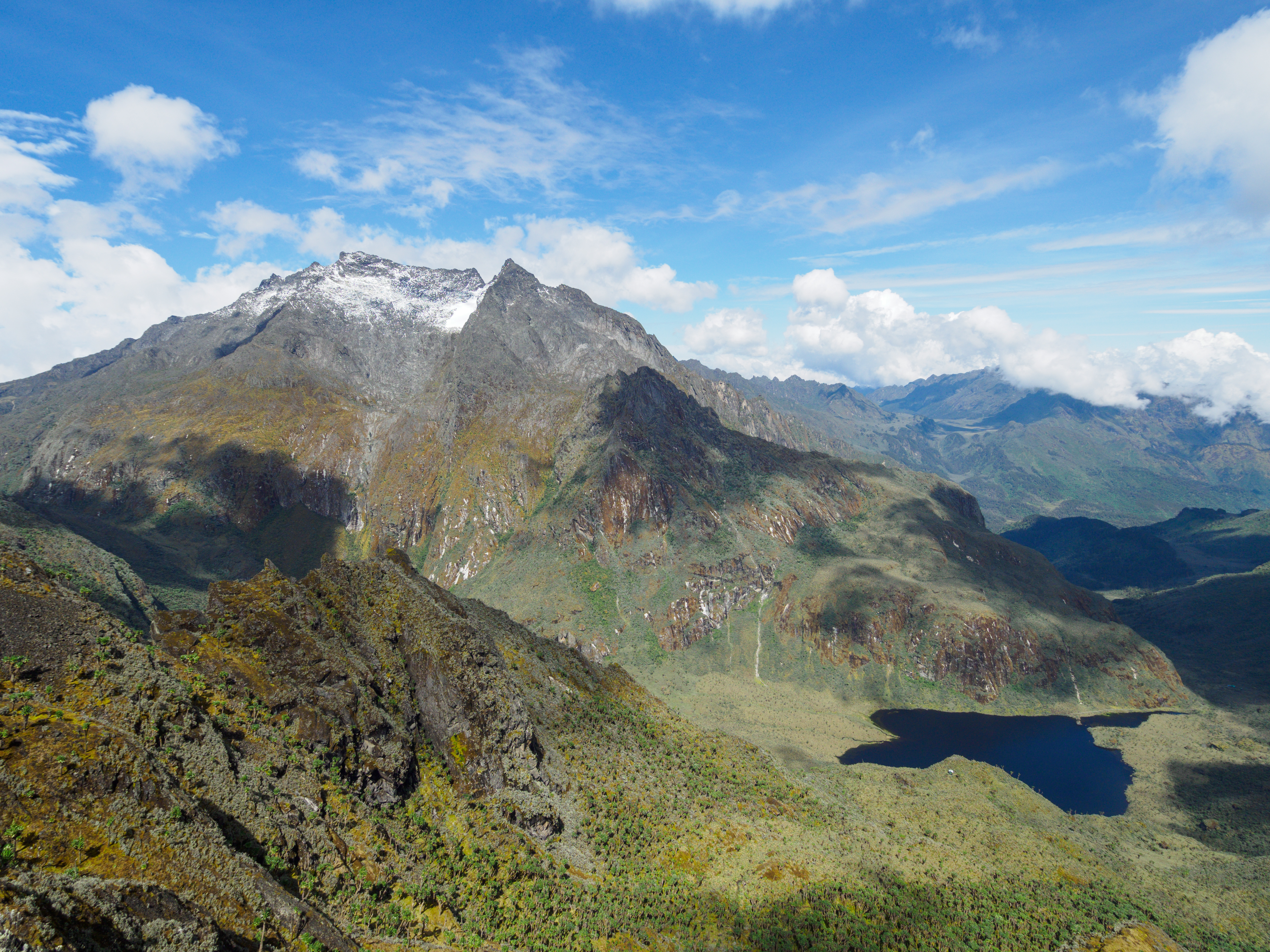
Mount Speke Lake Bujuku

Lake Bujuku is a crater lake in the Rwenzori Mountains, Kasese district, western Uganda. Its a tourist destination. The hiking trail to Lake Bujuku takes at least 3 days. The lake is 1.37 kilometres (0.85 mi) long and is situated at 3,963 metres (13,002 ft) above sea level, at the head of Bujuku valley.

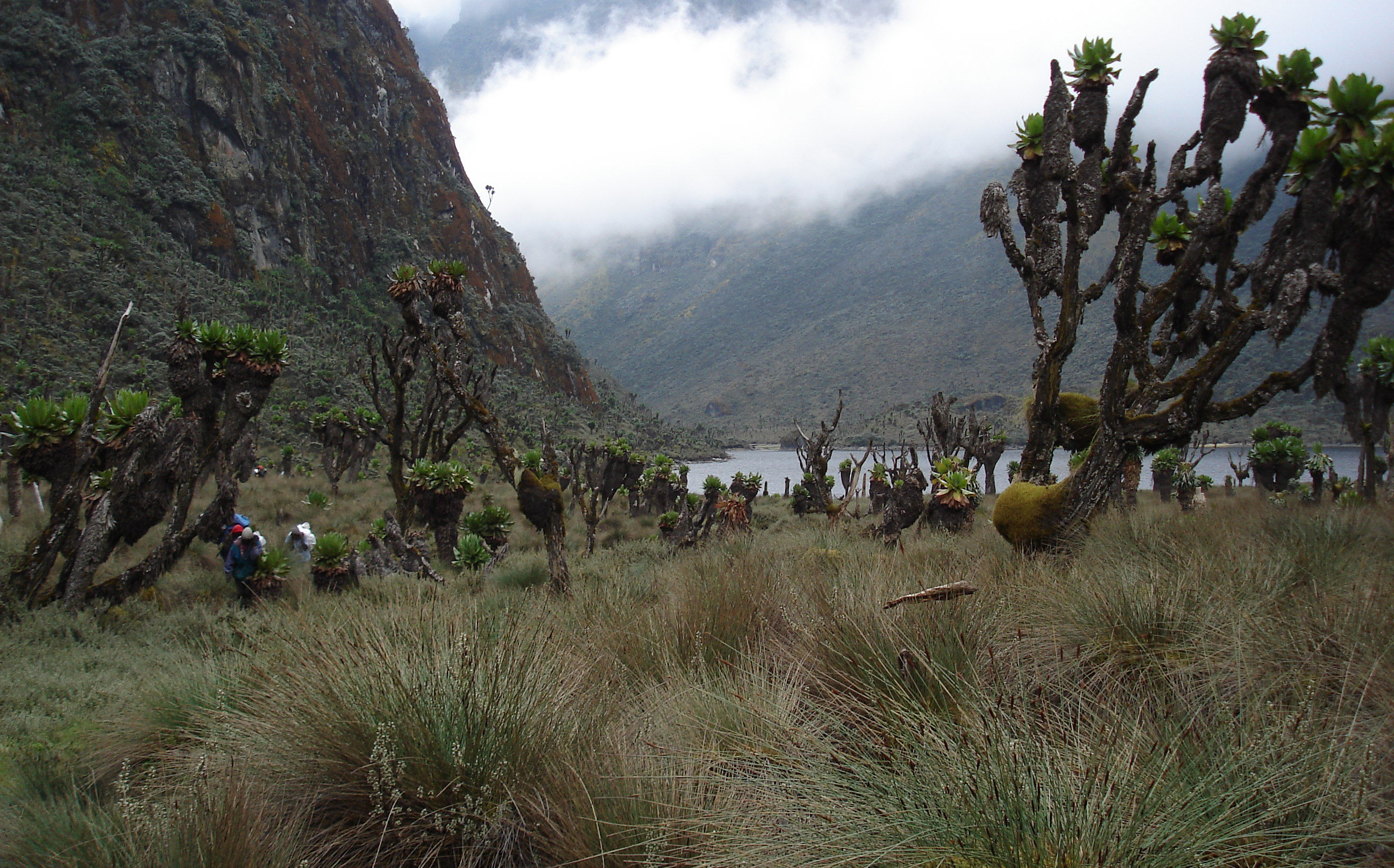
Lake Bujuku Flora and Fauna

== See also ==
- Lake Chahafi
- Lake Edward
- Lake Kamunzuku
