= Lake Edward =

Lake in Uganda and smallest of the African Great Lakes

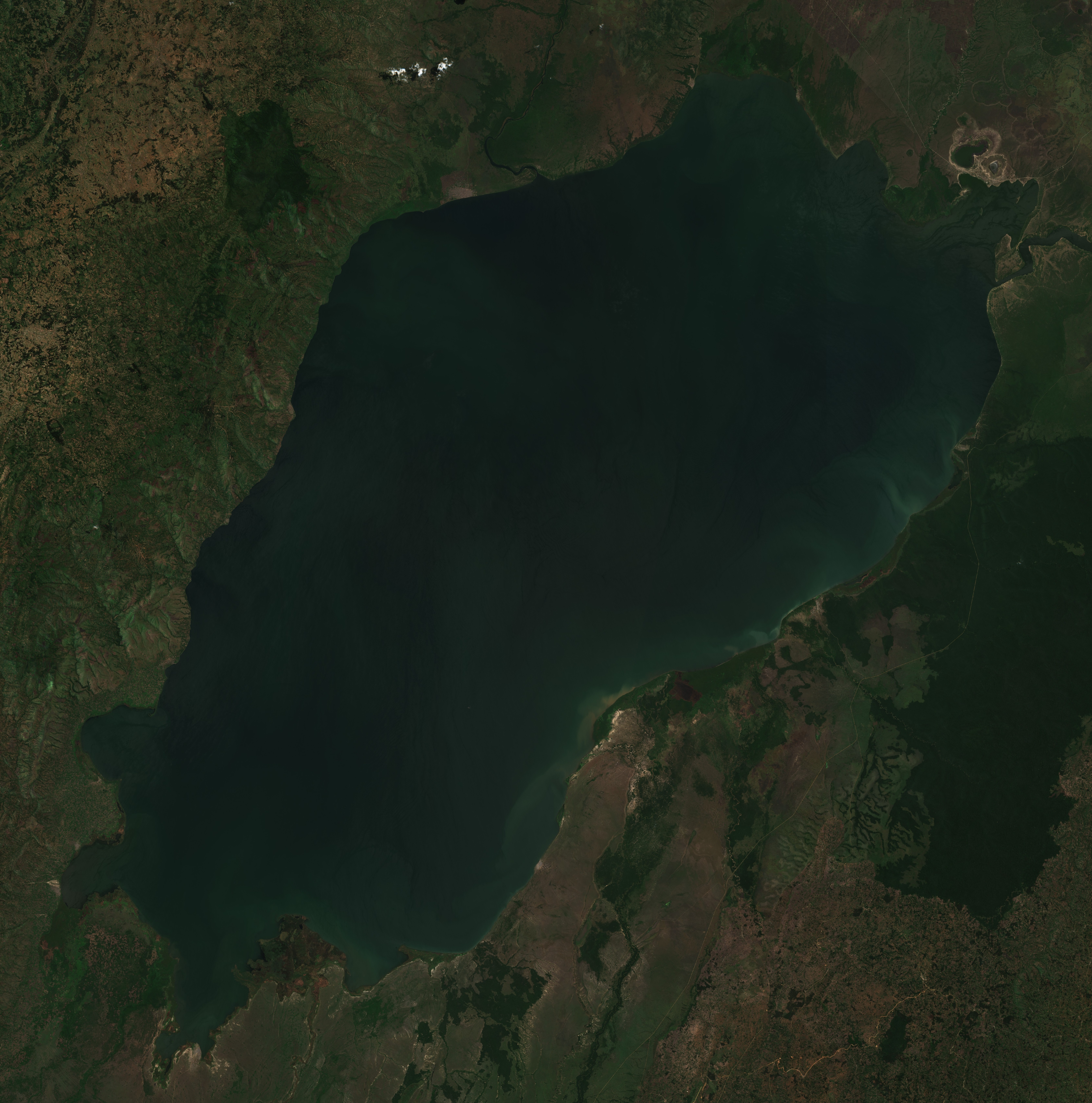
- Sentinel-2 photo of Lake Edward

- Location within Uganda Location within Democratic Republic of the Congo Location within Africa
- Coordinates: 0°20′S 29°36′E
- Primary inflows: Nyamugasani; Ishasha; Rutshuru; Rwindi; Ntungwe; Lubilia
- Primary outflows: Semliki River
- Catchment area: 12,096 km^{2} (4,670 sq mi)
- Basin countries: Democratic Republic of Congo; Uganda
- Max. length: 77 km (48 mi)
- Max. width: 40 km (25 mi)
- Surface area: 2,325 km^{2} (898 sq mi)
- Average depth: 17 m (56 ft)
- Max. depth: 112 m (367 ft)
- Water volume: 39.5 km^{3} (9.5 cu mi)
- Surface elevation: 912 m (2,992 ft)

Lake Edward (locally Rwitanzigye or Rweru) is one of the smaller African Great Lakes. It is located in the Albertine Rift, the western branch of the East African Rift, on the border between the Democratic Republic of the Congo (DRC) and Uganda, with its northern shore a few kilometres south of the equator.

== History ==
Welsh explorer Henry Morton Stanley first saw the lake in 1888, during the Emin Pasha Relief Expedition. The lake was named in honour of Albert Edward, Prince of Wales, son of then British monarch Queen Victoria, and later to become King Edward VII.

In 1973, Uganda and the then Zaire (DRC) renamed it Lake Idi Amin after Ugandan dictator Idi Amin. After his overthrow in 1979, it recovered its former name.

In 2014, the lake was the center of an oil dispute. SOCO International entered the premises of the Virunga National Park where the lake is situated to prospect for oil. However, villagers and workers who attempted to stop the oil company from entering the area were beaten up and even kidnapped and tortured. Plans to redraw the lines of Virunga's boundaries and exclude the lake were taken into consideration. However, since the park is a world heritage site and the lake is part of it, such plans naturally go against the World Heritage Convention.

== Geography ==
=== Topography and drainage ===
Lake Edward lies at an elevation of 920 metres (3,020 ft), is 77 kilometres (48 mi) long by 40 kilometres (25 mi) wide at its maximum points, and covers a total surface area of 2,325 square kilometres (898 mi^{2}), making it the 15th-largest on the continent. The lake is fed by the Nyamugasani River, the Ishasha River, the Rutshuru River, the Ntungwe River, and the Rwindi River. Lake George to the northeast empties into it via the Kazinga Channel. Lake Edward empties to the north via the Semliki River into Lake Albert, where is joins the White Nile, ultimately flowing to the Nile.

The western escarpment of the Great Rift Valley towers up to 2,000 metres (6,600 ft) above the western shore of the lake. The southern and eastern shores are flat lava plains. The Ruwenzori Mountains are 20 kilometres (12 mi) north of the lake.

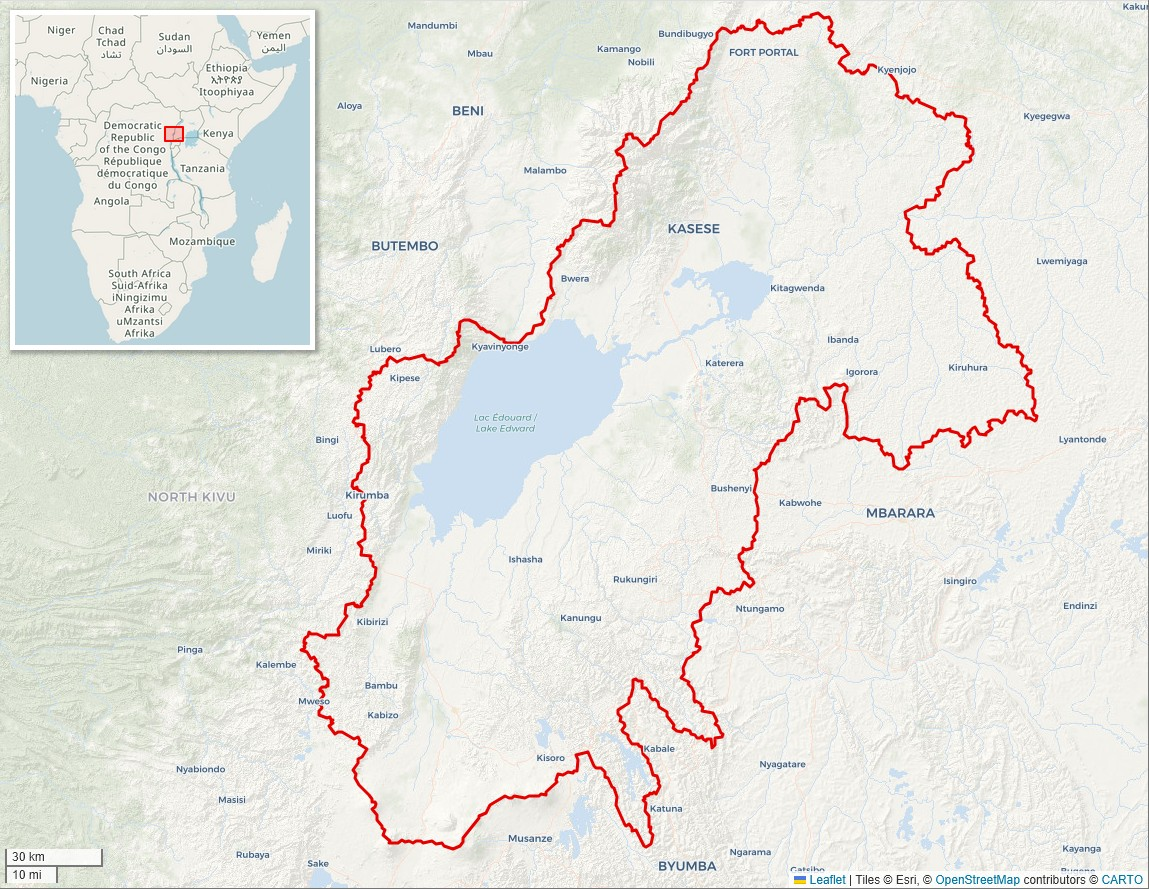
Map of the Lake Edward drainage basin or watershed. Interactive map

=== Volcanism ===
The region shows much evidence of volcanic activity over the last 5000 years. The Katwe-Kikorongo and Bunyaruguru Volcanic Fields, with extensive cones and craters, lie either side of the Kazinga Channel on the northwest shore of the lake. It is thought that Lakes George and Edward used to be joined as one larger lake, but lava from these fields flowed in and divided it, leaving only the Kazinga Channel as the remnant of the past union. To the south lies the May-ya-Moto thermally active volcano 30 kilometres (19 mi) away, and the Nyamuragira volcano in the western Virunga Mountains lies 80 kilometres (50 mi) south, but its lava flows have reached the lake in the past.

The Katwe-Kikorongo field features dozens of large craters and cones covering an area of 30 kilometres (19 mi) by 15 kilometres (9.3 mi) between lakes Edward and George, and includes seven crater lakes. The largest of these, the 2.5 kilometres (1.6 mi) long Lake Katwe, occupies a crater 4 kilometres (2.5 mi) across and is separated from Lake Edward by just 300 metres (980 ft) of land. The crater is about 100 metres (330 ft) deep, and Lake Katwe's surface is about 40 metres (130 ft) lower than Lake Edward's. It is remarkable that the volcanic origin of this area southeast of the Ruwenzoris was not known until it was reported by G. F. Scott Elliot in 1894. Stanley visited Lake Katwe in 1889 and noted the deep depression, the salinity of the lake, and a spring of sulphurous water nearby, but he failed to connect this to volcanism.

High-resolution analyses of the elemental composition of calcite and biogenic silica (BSi) content in piston cores from Lake Edward, equatorial Africa, document complex interactions between climate variability and lacustrine geochemistry over the past 5400 years.

The similarly sized Bunyaruguru field on the other side of the Kazinga Channel contains about 30 crater lakes, some of which are larger than Lake Katwe.

=== Settlements ===
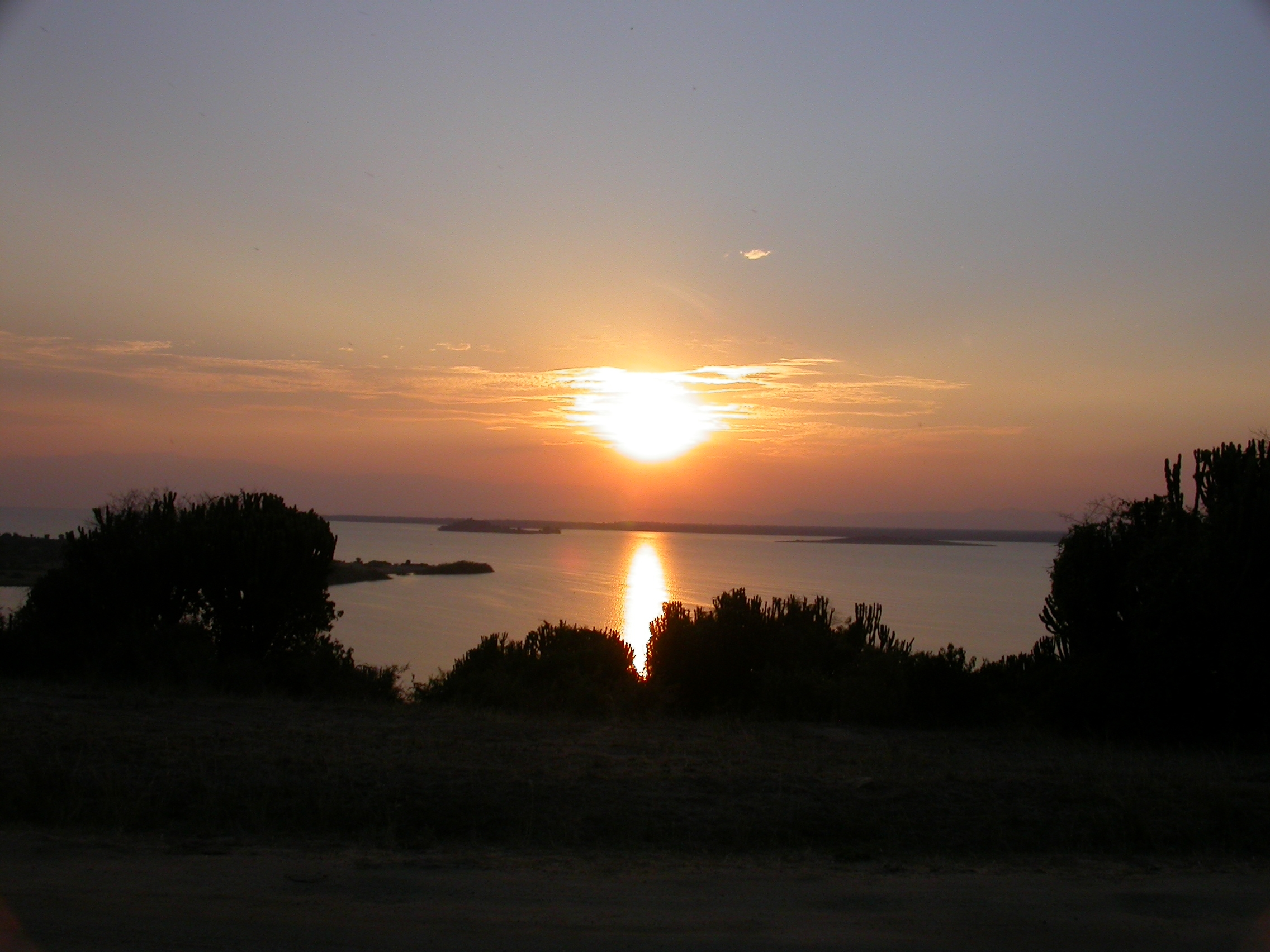
Lake Edward from Mweya in Queen Elizabeth National Park

Lake Edward lies completely within the Virunga National Park (DRC) and the Queen Elizabeth National Park (Uganda) and does not have extensive human habitation on its shores, except at Ishango (DRC) in the north, home to a park ranger training facility. About two-thirds of its waters are in the DRC and one third in Uganda. Apart from Ishango, the main Congolese settlement in the south is Vitshumbi, while the Ugandan settlements are Mweya and Katwe in the northeast, near the crater lake of that name, which is the chief producer of salt for Uganda. The nearest cities are Kasese in Uganda to the northeast and Butembo in the DRC to the northwest, which are respectively about 50 kilometres (31 mi) and 150 kilometres (93 mi) distant by road.

== Ecology ==
Lake Edward is home to many species of fish, including populations of Bagrus docmak, Oreochromis niloticus, Oreochromis leucostictus, and over 50 species of Haplochromis and other haplochromine species, of which only 25 are formally described. Fishing is an important activity among local residents. Fauna living on the banks of the lake – including chimpanzees, elephants, crocodiles, and lions – are protected by the national parks. The area is also home to many perennial and migratory bird species.

=== Decline of hippos and tilapia ===
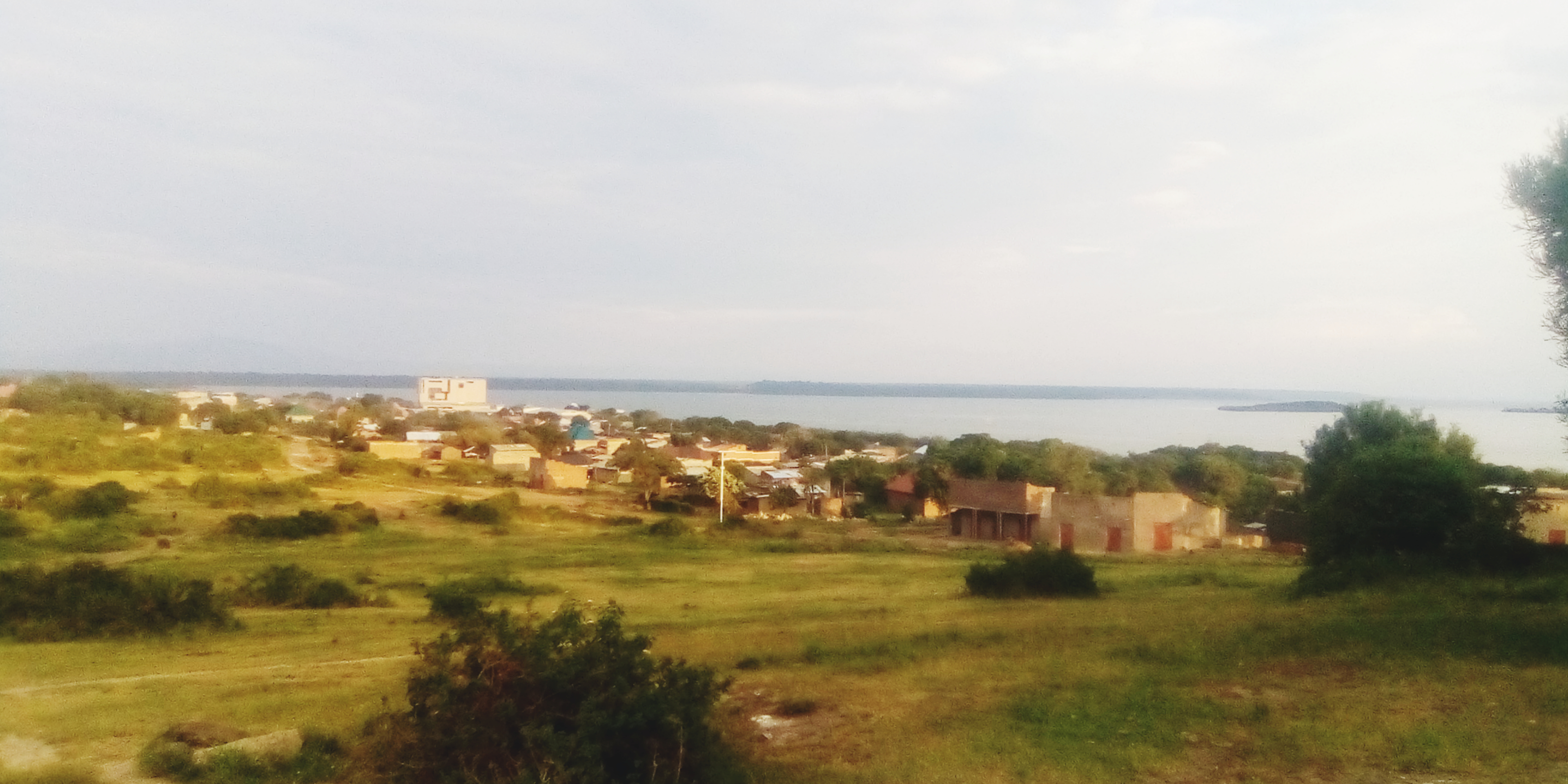
Photo of Lake Edward Katwe Landing site

In the 1970s, Lake Edward held a population of around 29,000 hippos in and around the area of the lake. But due to an increase in poaching over the years, there has been a 95% decline in the population, with the population plummeting to only a few hundred by the end of 2006. A terrestrial census was conducted in 2019 assessing that the population was now at 1,500 individuals. The hippopotamus is often poached for its large amount of meat as well as the ivory found in its teeth. Fueled by the high prices that hippo meat and ivory fetch, poachers are consistently hunting for these animals, which is causing a negative impact not only on the hippopotamus population, but the Lake Edward ecosystem and the local fishermen that depend on the lake for survival.

The hippopotamus population is extremely important to the ecosystem of Lake Edward due to being a keystone species. Hippos produce dung, which feed tilapia, a once abundant fish species found in Lake Edward. One hippo could produce around 25 kilograms or 55 pounds of dung per day, which could feed thousands of tilapia within the ecosystem. With the hippopotamus population declining due to poaching, the food they provide to the tilapia fish started to disappear as well. This has caused an immense decline in the tilapia population, as the decreasing hippo population cannot support the same amount of the tilapia fish species as it did before, causing a growing problem not only for the ecosystem, but the fishermen within the villages that surround Lake Edward.

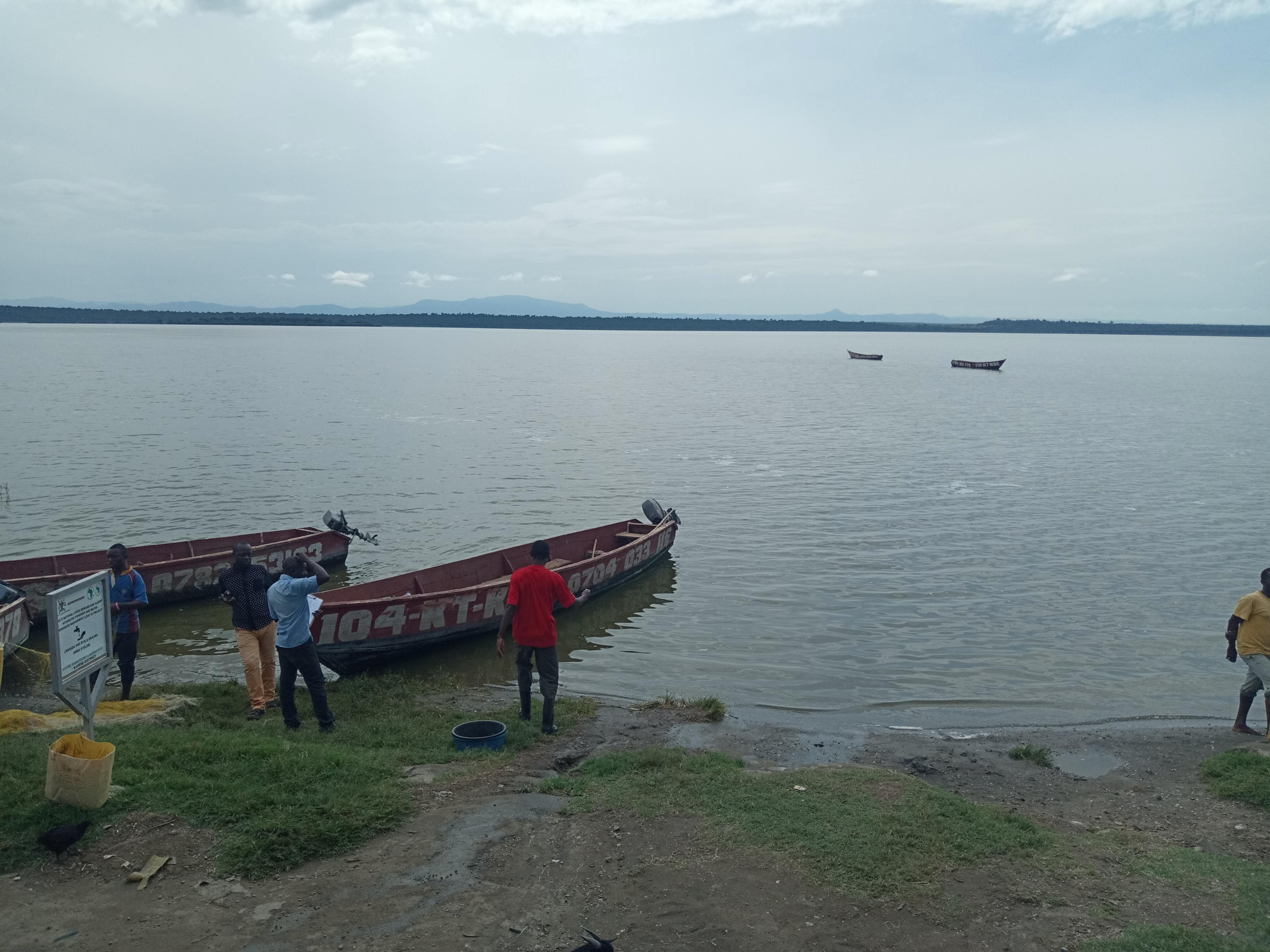
Fishermen on Lake Edward

Being so close to Lake Edward, the villages that are within the area often rely on the fish, specifically tilapia, to support their families with food and money. In the past, Lake Edward could support the fish demand for the entire eastern DRC. The lake had a production capacity of between 15,000 and 20,000 metric tons of tilapia annually, with an estimate of around 700 fishing canoes on the lake. Due to the decline of hippos in the area because of poaching, this has impacted the amount of tilapia in the lake, which has caused the fishermen in the nearby villages to suffer, as well as the rest of the eastern DRC. Many markets are unable to sustain their own fish, now having to import fish from other areas to continue with their business.

Though, the declining hippo populations are not the only threat to the tilapia in Lake Edward. Due to the decrease in tilapia populations, spawning areas and fisheries for the fish are off limits to fishermen. But some rebel groups as well as robbers or illegal fishers are trying their luck at these areas, often causing even more problems when trying to conserve and increase the tilapia population in the area. Because of this, many villages around Lake Edward as well as the ecosystem of Lake Edward are suffering.

== 2018 Lake Edward Skirmish ==
On July 6, 2018, there was a naval skirmish between the two nations of Uganda and the Democratic Republic of the Congo on Lake Edward. This skirmish began as a result of Congolese naval vessels being sent to investigate reports of the Ugandan navy apprehending several Congolese fishing vessels, and civilians. This clash resulted in the death of one person, and the wounding of three others.

Early reports by local Congolese officials claim that seven were killed in the clash; however, this has not been backed up by either national government. On July 9, North Kivu official Muhindo Kyakwa claimed twelve Congolese fishermen had been killed in the clashes.

== See also ==
- List of lakes of Uganda
- List of protected areas of Uganda
