= Uganda Wildlife Authority =

Ugandan government agency

- Logo of the UWA

Agency overview
- Preceding agency: Uganda Game and Fisheries Department
- Jurisdiction: Government of Uganda
- Headquarters: Plot. 7, Kira Road, Kamwookya, Kampala, Uganda; 00°20′10″N 32°35′01″E
- Motto: Conserving for Generations
- Minister responsible: Tom Butime, Minister of Tourism, Wildlife and Antiquities
- Deputy Ministers responsible: State Minister for Tourism, Godfrey Kiwanda; Sam Mwandha, Executive Director
- Parent department: Wildlife Conservation Department
- Parent agency: Ministry of Tourism, Wildlife and Antiquities
- Key document: Uganda Wildlife Act
- Website: www.ugandawildlife.org

Uganda Wildlife Authority (UWA; Luganda: Ekitongole ekivunaanyizibwa ku bisolo by'omu nsiko mu Uganda) is a semi-autonomous Ugandan government agency that aims to conserve, manage and regulate Uganda’s wildlife. "UWA is mandated to ensure sustainable management of wildlife resources and supervise wildlife activities in Uganda, both within and outside the protected areas". As of April 2020, UWA manages ten national parks, twelve wildlife reserves, and fourteen wildlife sanctuaries. UWA also provides guidance for five community wildlife areas. It is governed by a board of trustees appointed by the Minister of Tourism, Wildlife and Antiquities, currently Tom Butime.

== Location ==
The headquarters of UWA are located at Plot. 7, Kira Road, in the neighborhood called Kamwookya, in the Central Division of the city of Kampala, Uganda's capital. The UWA headquarters building is sandwiched between the Uganda Museum to the west and the British High Commission to the east, along Kira Road. The geographical coordinates of this location are:0°20'10.0"N, 32°35'01.0"E (Latitude:0.336111, Longitude:32.583611).

== Governance ==
=== Board of trustees ===
The agency is governed by a nine-member board of trustees, appointed by the Minister of Tourism, Wildlife and Antiquities. The current board, which was appointed in March 2018, is chaired by Benjamin Otto, a former Permanent Secretary in the Ministry of Tourism. The board serves for three years. The table below lists all the board members.

Members of the Board of Trustees of Uganda Wildlife Authority 2018–2022
Rank	Name	Position	Role	Notes
1	Benjamin Otto	Former PS, Ministry of Tourism	Chairman	
2	Gladys Kalema-Zikusoka	CEO of Conservation Through Public Health	Member	
3	Mani Khan	Director of Operations at MARASDA Group	Member	
4	Captain John Emily Otekat	Former Deputy Director of Operations at UWA	Member	
5	Boniface Byamukama	Chairman of the Association of Uganda Tour Operators (AUTO)	Member	
6	Grace Aulo Mbabazi	Commissioner for Tourism in the Ministry of Tourism	Member	
7	Janat Akorimoe Akech	Former Member of Parliament	Member	
8	Michael Aliyo	Senior economist, Ministry of Finance	Member	
9	Sam Mwandha	Executive Director of UWA	Board Secretary	

=== Management ===
On 26 March 2018, Sam Mwandha, who was previously employed at UWA in the early 2010s, assumed the office of executive director of Uganda Wildlife Authority, succeeding Dr. Andrew Seguya, who had served two consecutive three-year terms in that office.

== History ==
The UWA was established in August 1996 by the Uganda Wildlife Statute, which merged the Uganda National Parks Department with the Uganda Game and Fisheries Department. In 2000, the Statute became an Act of parliament. The Act was amended in 2019 into the Uganda Wildlife Act 2019.
