= Bujerere =

- Map of Uganda showing the location of Bujerere; Placement on map is approximate.
- Coordinates: 00°37′53″N 29°57′33″E
- Country: Uganda
- Region: Western Region of Uganda
- Sub-region: Rwenzururu sub-region
- District: Bundibugyo District
- Elevation: 1,200 m (3,900 ft)
- Time zone: UTC+3 (EAT)
- Climate: Am

Bujerere is a settlement in the Western Region of Uganda.

== Location ==
Bujerere is located on the eastern banks of the Lamia River, in Bundibugyo District, across the international border with the Democratic Republic of the Congo. It is approximately 11 kilometres (6.8 mi), by road, southwest of the district headquarters at Bundibugyo. Bujerere is approximately 400 kilometres (250 mi), by road, west of Kampala, Uganda's capital and largest city. The coordinates of Bujerere are 0°37'53.0"N, 29°57'33.0"E (Latitude:0.631389; Longitude:29.959167).

== Overview ==
Bujerere marks the western end of the 104 kilometres (65 mi) Fort Portal–Bundibugyo–Lamia Road.

== See also ==
- Rwenzori Mountains
- Bundibugyo Airport
