= Fort Portal–Bundibugyo–Lamia Road =

Road in Uganda

Coordinates: 00°42′25″N 30°03′47″E

Route information
- Length: 65 mi (105 km)
- History: Designated in 2010; Completed in 2014

Major junctions
- East end: Fort Portal
- Bundibugyo
- West end: Lamia

Location
- Country: Uganda

Highway system
- Roads in Uganda

The Fort Portal–Bundibugyo–Lamia Road is in the Western Region of Uganda. It links Fort Portal in the Kabarole District with the towns of Bundibugyo and Lamia in the Bundibugyo District.

== Location ==
The road starts in Fort Portal, east of the Rwenzori Mountains. It runs north along the western border of Semliki National Park. After cutting across the mountain range, it makes a 180 degree turn and runs south along the western foothills of the range. It gradually turns westward, through Bundibugyo town to end at the border with the Democratic Republic of the Congo (DRC) at the banks of the Lamia River. The length of the road is approximately 103.6 kilometres (64.4 mi).

== Overview ==
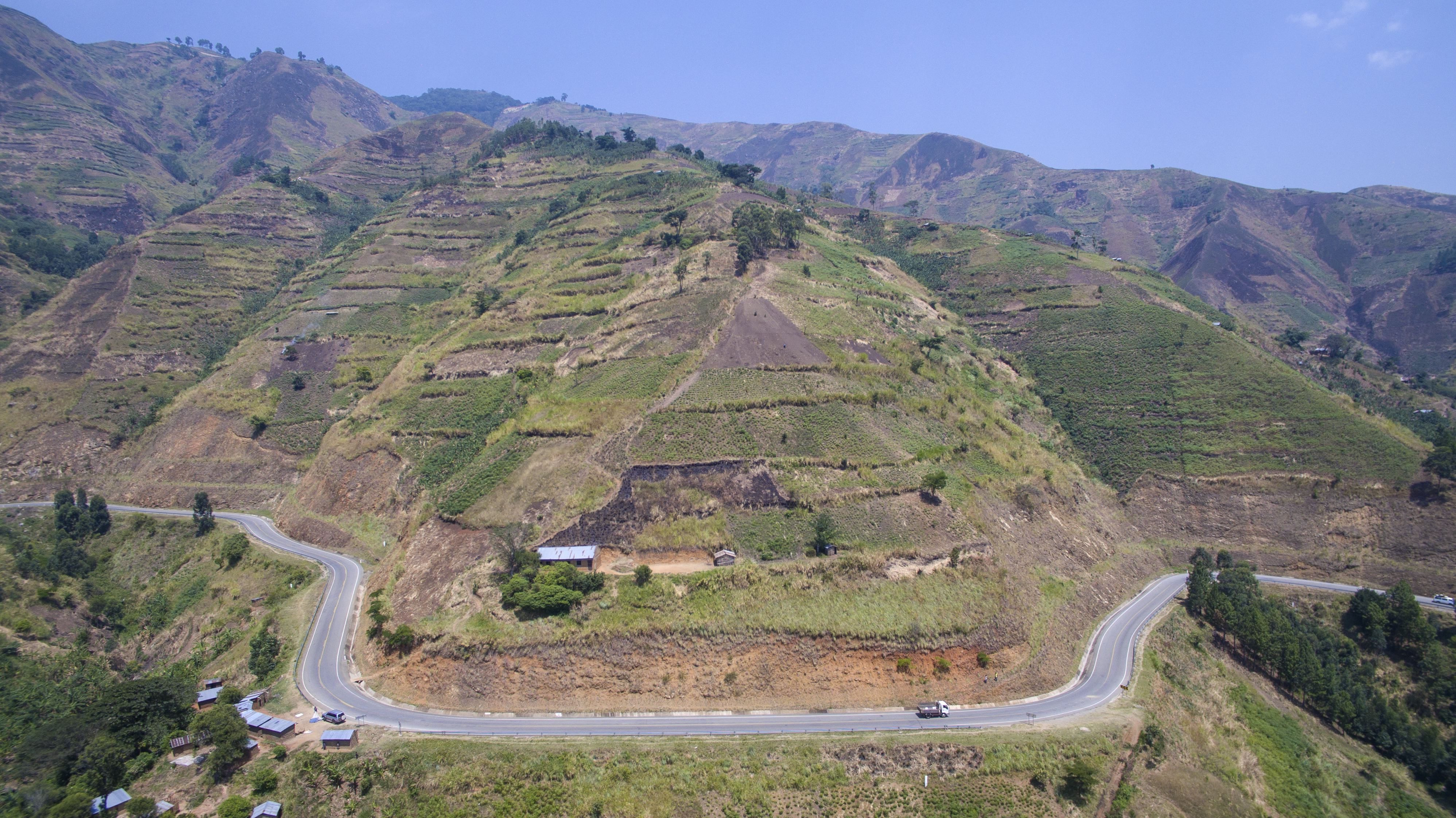
Bundibugyo road in western Uganda

Before 2010, the road was gravel surface. Between 2010 and 2014, the government of Uganda, with funding from the African Development Bank (ADB), upgraded the road to class II asphalt bitumen with a width of 6 metres (20 ft) and shoulders of 1.5 metres (4.9 ft) on each side. Construction was undertaken by the Chongqing International Construction Corporation from March 2010 until March 2014. The road was officially commissioned in August 2015 by Allen Kagina, the executive director of the Uganda National Roads Authority.

== Construction costs ==
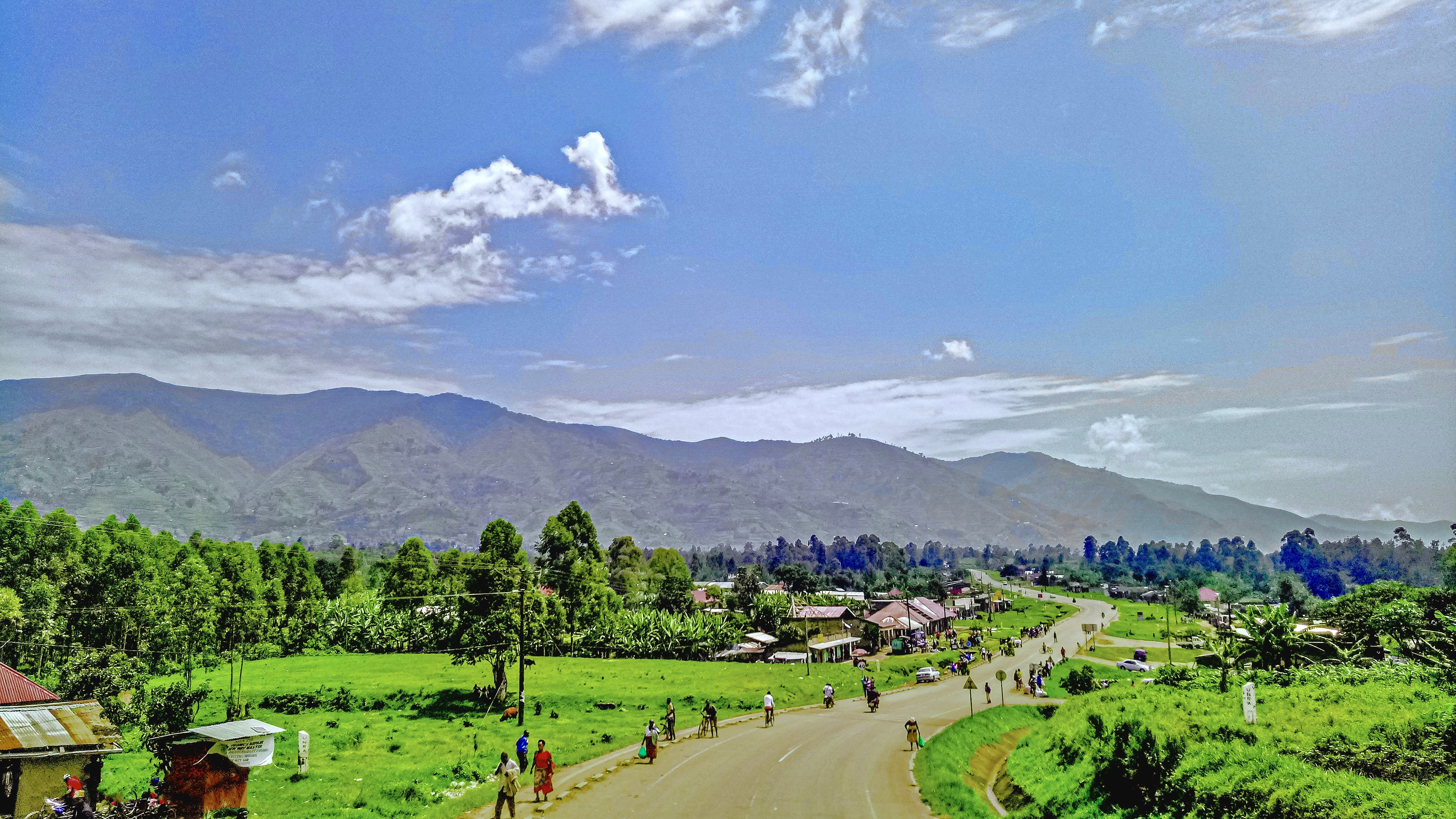
Bundibugyo road with the Rwenzori ranges in background

The original cost of the road was budgeted at USh 170 billion (US$68 million) in 2010, with the government of Uganda contributing USh 29.58 billion (17.4 percent) and the ADB providing a loan of USh 140.42 billion (82.6 percent). Because of the adverse terrain and other factors, the original road design was revised and the final contract price was USh 217.8 billion.

== Point of interest ==
Other point of interest close to or near the road:

- settlement of Bujerere in Bundibugyo District on the banks of the Lamia River forming the international border with the DRC

== See also ==
- List of roads in Uganda
