= Yenga, Uganda =

Yenga
- Village
- Location in Uganda
- Coordinates: 00°51′03″N 30°01′09″E
- Country: Uganda
- Region: Western Uganda
- Sub-region: Rwenzururu sub-region
- District: Bundibugyo District
- Elevation: 670 m (2,200 ft)
- Climate: Aw

Yenga is an Amba village in western Uganda, Bundibugyo District, on the border with the Congo. It lies in the rift valley between Lake Albert and Lake Edward above the Semliki River. The village is within the borders of the Semuliki National Park. To the south of the village are the foothills of the Rwenzori Mountains. While Yenga is only 24 kilometres (15 mi) from the district capital of Bundibugyo, the nearest town of substance is Fort Portal. Yenga is located in lowland tropical rainforest, much like the Ituri Rainforest across the river.

== History ==
Yenga, with its Amba populace, was unwillingly made part of the Toro Kingdom when the British established the Uganda Protectorate. They were part of the armed struggle in the 1960s to free the Rwenzururu region from the Toro monarchy. Yenga became part of the Kingdom of Rwenzururu which was finally recognized by the Ugandan government in 2008.

== Economy ==
The Amab in Yenga are agriculturalists. They grow mainly plantain (for matoke), yams, potatoes, cassava and beans and keep some livestock, mainly chickens and goats.
