= Bundibugyo General Hospital =

Geography
- Location: Bundibugyo, Bundibugyo District, Western Region, Uganda
- Coordinates: 00°42′11″N 30°03′49″E

Organisation
- Care system: Public
- Type: General

Services
- Beds: 160

History
- Founded: 1969

Links
- Other links: Hospitals in Uganda

Bundibugyo General Hospital, also Bundibugyo District Hospital or Bundibugyo Hospital, is a hospital in the Western Region of Uganda.

== Location ==
The hospital is located in the town of Bundibugyo, in Bundibugyo District, approximately 85 kilometres (53 mi), by road, west of Fort Portal Regional Referral Hospital. The coordinates of Bundibugyo General Hospital are:0°42'11.0"N 30°03'49.0"E, Latitude:0.703056; Longitude:30.063611).

== Overview ==
Bundibugyo Hospital is a public hospital, funded by the Uganda Ministry of Health. General care in the hospital is free. The facility was founded in 1969 by the government of Prime minister Milton Obote. The hospital infrastructure and equipment has been neglected and is in very poor condition. The hospital offers services from the district of Bundibugyo and Ntoroko and from neighboring communities in the Democratic Republic of the Congo. In 2015, the government of Uganda began renovating certain hospitals in the country, including this hospital.

== See also ==
- List of hospitals in Uganda
