= AMAB =

AMAB or Amab may refer to:

- Assigned male at birth
- -amab, nomenclature of monoclonal antibodies
- Amab, agriculturalists in Yenga, Uganda

== See also ==
- G-AMAB, an Airspeed Ambassador airliner
