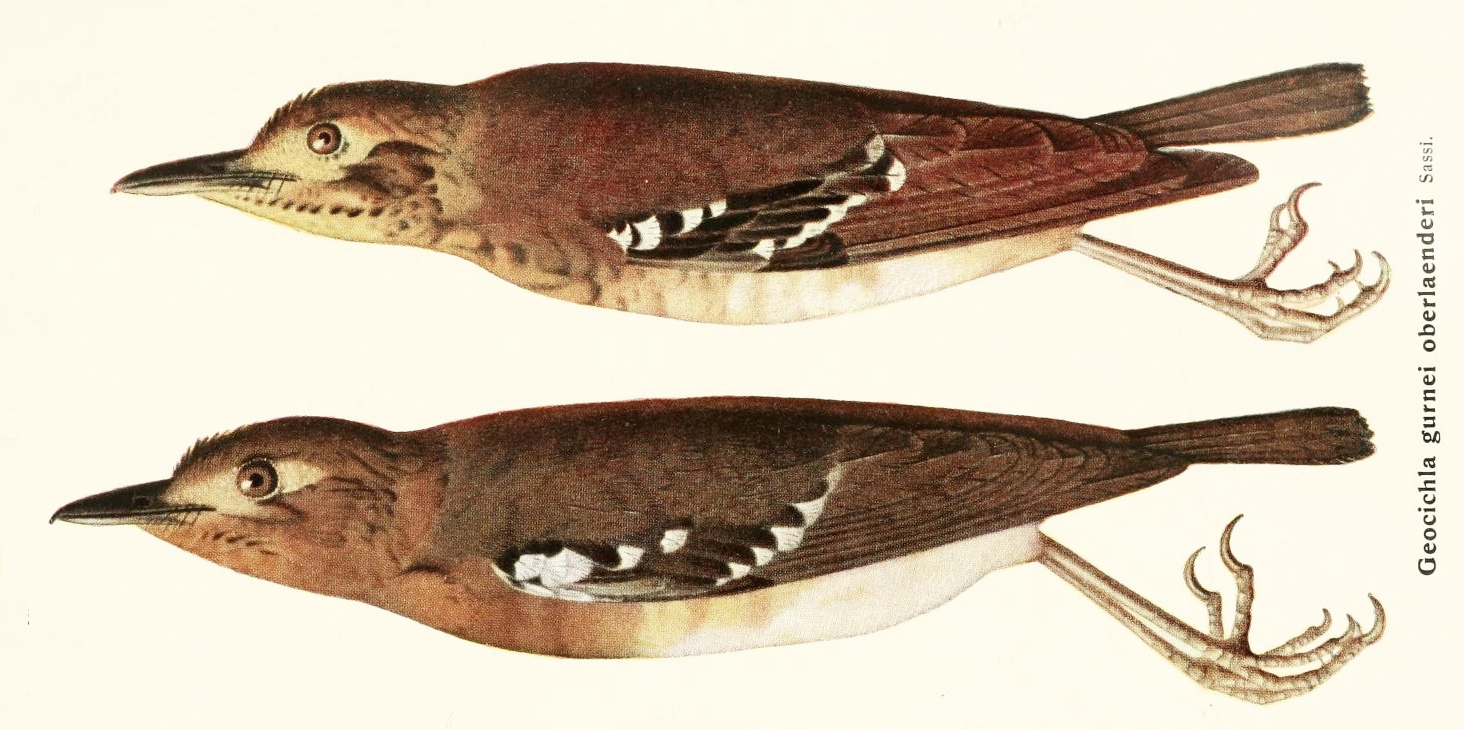

Conservation status
- Near Threatened (IUCN 3.1)

Scientific classification
- Kingdom: Animalia
- Phylum: Chordata
- Class: Aves
- Order: Passeriformes
- Family: Turdidae
- Genus: Geokichla
- Species: G. oberlaenderi

Binomial name
- Geokichla oberlaenderi Sassi, 1914

Synonyms
- Zoothera oberlaenderi

= Oberländer's ground thrush =

Species of bird

Oberländer's ground thrush (Geokichla oberlaenderi), also known as the forest ground-thrush, is a species of bird in the thrush family, Turdidae. It is found in the Democratic Republic of the Congo and Uganda.

== Taxonomy ==
This species was described as Geocichla gurneyi oberlaenderi by Sassi in 1914 as a race of the orange ground thrush and later as a population of the Abyssinian ground thrush. It is monotypic. The species is named after Philipp von Oberländer who funded the expedition of the collector Rudolf Grauer.

== Distribution and habitat ==
There have been records of the species in the Ituri Forest, the Semliki Valley and the Itombwe Mountains in the Democratic Republic of the Congo, and the Bwamba Forest and Bwindi Impenetrable Forest in Uganda, but it may have become locally extinct in some areas. In Uganda, the species is only known to still exist in Bwindi Impenetrable National Park. The size of its range is estimated at 52,500 km^{2} (20,300 sq mi). Its habitat is riparian forests at elevations of 700–2,000 m (2,300–6,600 ft).

== Description ==
Its length is 20 cm (7.9 in), and it weighs 41–48 g (1.4–1.7 oz). The sexes are alike. The forehead and cheeks are deep rufous-chestnut. The back is rufous or orange-brown. The tail is brown. The median coverts have white spots, and the greater coverts are olive-black. The flight feathers are dark brown. On the underwings, the axillaries are whitish, the coverts are grey-brown, and there is a white band on the primaries and secondaries. The throat and breast are deep rufous-orange. The vent and undertail coverts are white. The legs are pinkish to whitish. The beak is black. There is a broken white eye-ring. The immature has a darker crown, dark patches on its face and a horn-brown beak, and its breast and upper belly have mottles or spots.

== Behavior ==
It is not migratory, but may move locally. Its song is loud, mellow phrases, going up and down the scale. It forages on the ground, eating insects and slugs. Little is known about its breeding. Its eggs are undescribed. The breeding season is probably the rainy season and the late dry season. A nest made of dry grasses and strips and fibres of plants was found in Bwindi Impenetrable Forest in 1998. Squirrels later destroyed the nest. In 2007, a cup-shaped nest made of liverworts and ferns was found in Bwindi Impenetrable Forest. It was built on a branch of a tree and contained three nestlings.

== Status ==
The population size of Oberländer's ground thrush is not known but may be very small. It is declining because of habitat loss. The species is threatened by forest degradation and deforestation. The IUCN Red List has listed the species as near threatened because it has a small, threatened range and possibly a very small population.
