= Kitsanga massacre =

- Part of Allied Democratic Forces insurgency
- Location: Kitsanga and Lamia River, Watalinga Chiefdom, Beni Territory, North Kivu, Democratic Republic of the Congo
- Date: November 12-13, 2023; 11:30pm
- Target: Civilians
- Deaths: 42+
- Perpetrator: ISCAP
- Defender: FARDC (according to FARDC)

Between November 12 and 13, 2023, militants from the Islamic State – Central Africa Province (ISCAP), also called the Allied Democratic Forces (ADF), killed 42 people in the village of Kitsanga, Watalinga Chiefdom, Beni Territory, North Kivu, Democratic Republic of the Congo.

== Background ==
The Allied Democratic Forces (ADF) was founded in Uganda in the 1990s, gaining prominence as an Islamist rebel group and conducting deadly attacks on civilians in the early 2010s. The group pledged bay'ah to the Islamic State in 2019 and began carrying out its first attacks under the ISCAP moniker months later. Beginning in 2021, the ADF carried out dozens of deadly massacres against villages in North Kivu, attacking villagers along ethnic and religious lines.

In late 2023, the ADF carried out a series of massacres in North Kivu, beginning with the killing of dozens of civilians in Oicha in October 2023. This was partially instigated by the start of phase 4 of Operation Shujaa, a joint Ugandan-Congolese anti-ISCAP operation in North Kivu.

== Massacre ==
At about 11:30pm on November 12, ISCAP militants ended the village of Kitsanga, close to the Ugandan-Congolese border, going door-to-door and massacreing civilians. Several civilians were tied up with ropes before being executed. The ISCAP militants had entered Kitsanga from Ituri Province to the north, where they were losing territory as a result of Operation Shujaa. The fighters were led by a white man named Guraba. Another source in the Congolese army said that the fighters were from Beni, and led by a man named Sebangala or Mzee Mea. Shops in the Kitsanga market were looted, with the fighters seeking to resupply on pharmaceuticals.

Although no military presence was reported in the village during the massacre, a Congolese army captain in Kitsanga was killed by ISCAP and the Congolese army said six ISCAP militants were killed that night. Many civilians who fled tried to cross the Lamia river, with several drowning. One group of civilians was kidnapped and forced to loot for ISCAP before being executed; another group was repotedly freed by the Congolese army. Initial reports by Congolese media said that 19 civilians were killed, excluding two children who drowned crossing the Lamia. Reuters, citing humanitarian sources, said that 33 people were killed in the massacre. By November 17, Actualite.cd reported that 42 people had been killed, including 12 women, and 5,000 people were displaced to Butoho in Uganda. Several bodies of victims were found in Virunga National Park, and others who drowned were still unaccounted for.

== Aftermath ==
Following the massacre, ISCAP launched an attack on the village of Makodu also in North Kivu, killing 14 civilians on November 23.
