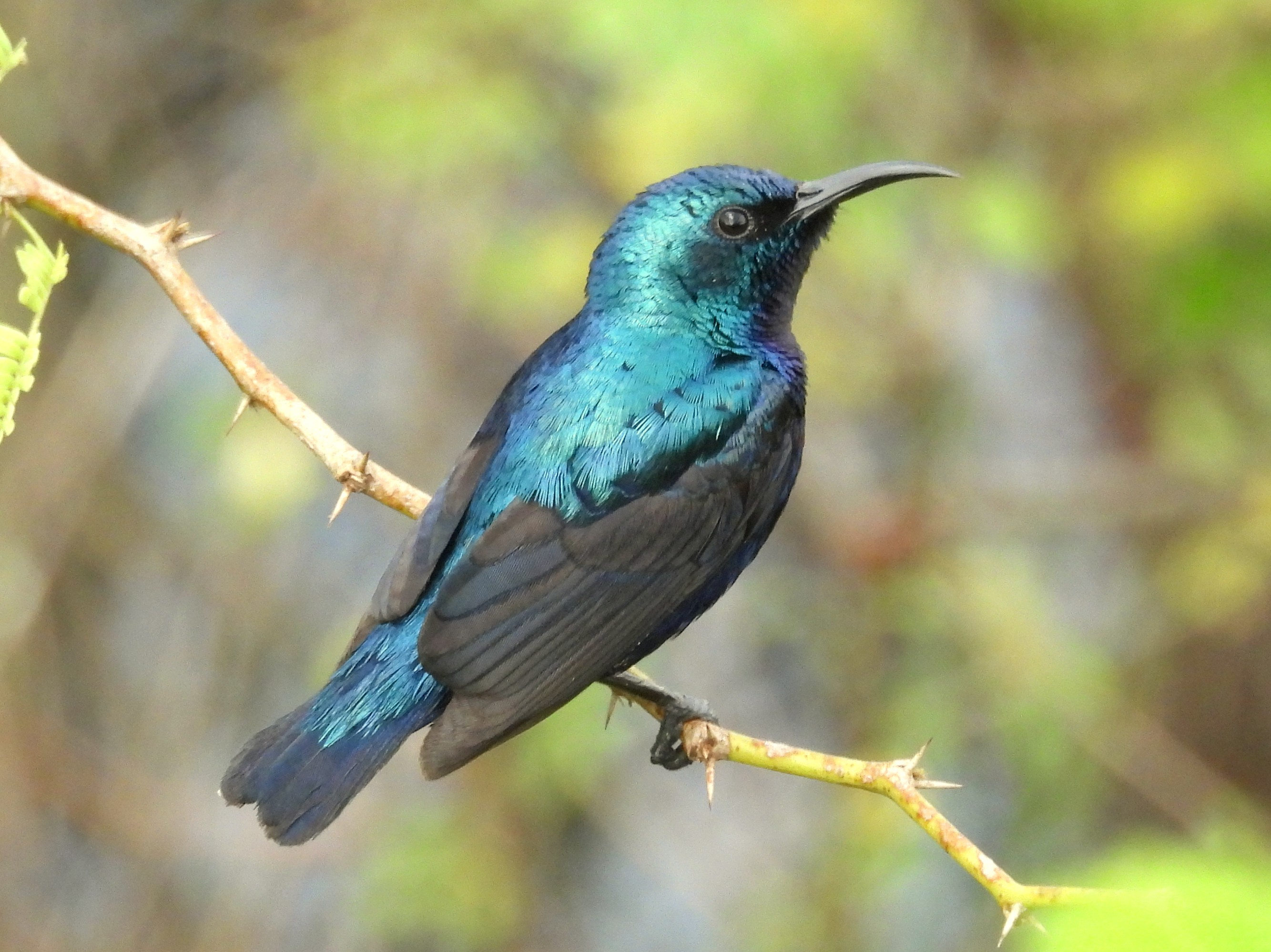
- Male in breeding plumage, Bangalore, India
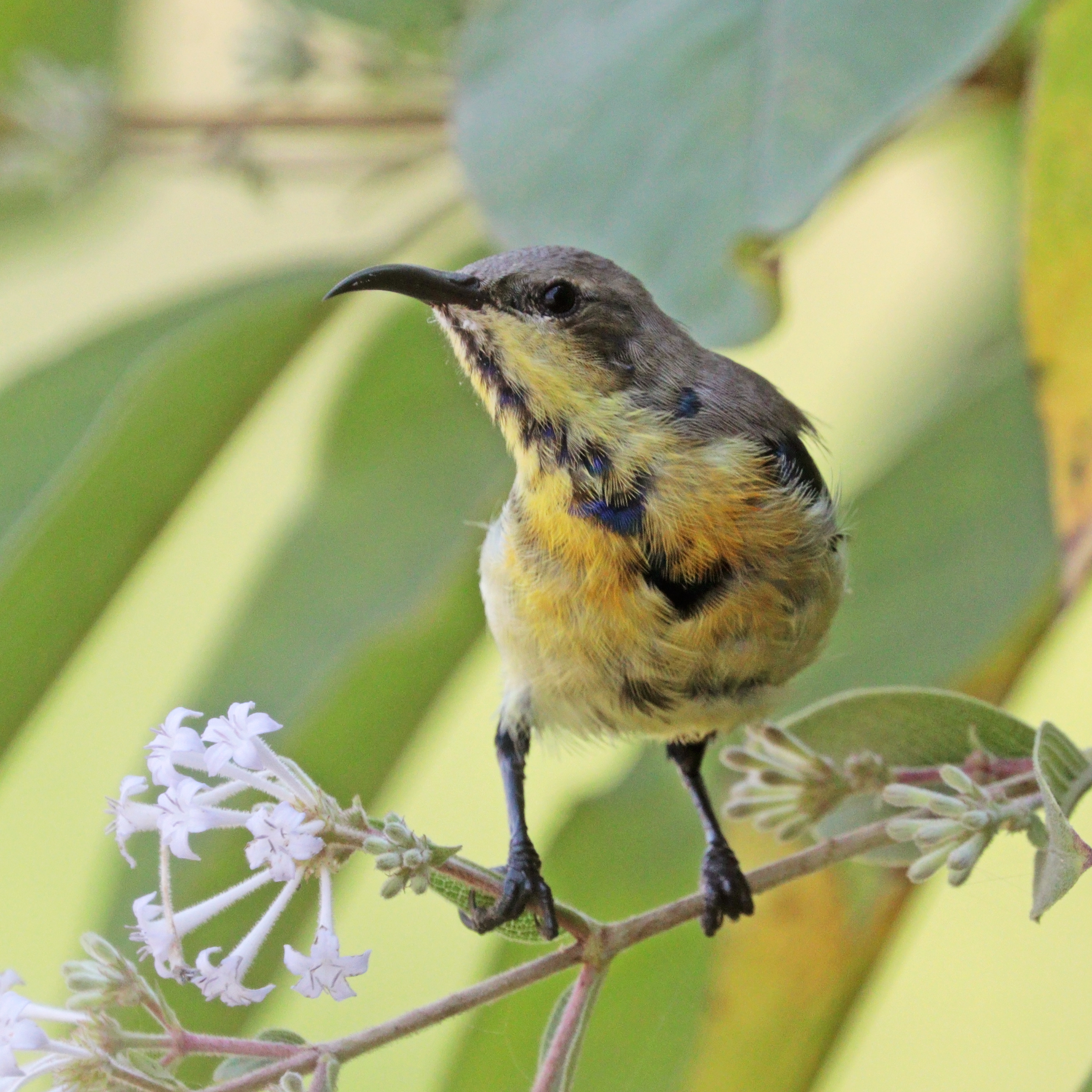
- Male in non-breeding plumage, Rajasthan, India Calls of male

Conservation status
- Least Concern (IUCN 3.1)

Scientific classification
- Kingdom: Animalia
- Phylum: Chordata
- Class: Aves
- Order: Passeriformes
- Family: Nectariniidae
- Genus: Cinnyris
- Species: C. asiaticus

Binomial name
- Cinnyris asiaticus (Latham, 1790)

Synonyms
- Arachnechthra intermedia Nectarinia mahrattensis

= Purple sunbird =

Species of bird

The purple sunbird (Cinnyris asiaticus) is a small bird in the sunbird family. It occurs in parts of the Arabian peninsula and South and Southeast Asia. It has a fast and direct flight and can take nectar by hovering like a hummingbird but often perches at the base of flowers. It feeds mainly on nectar and insects, especially when feeding young. The males can appear all black in harsh sunlight but the purple iridescence is visible on closer observation or under good light conditions. Females are olive above and yellowish below.

== Description ==
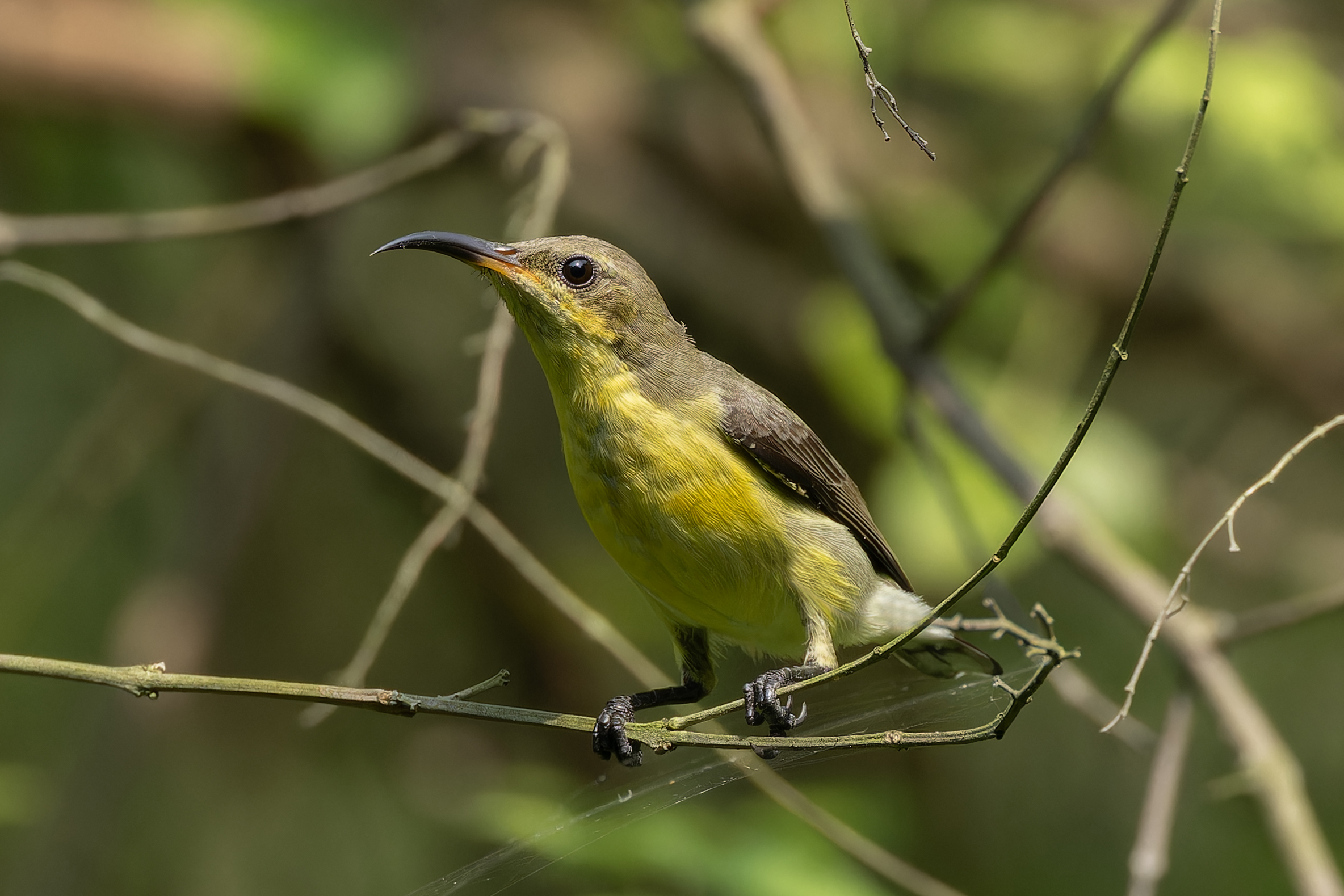
Female in West Bengal, India

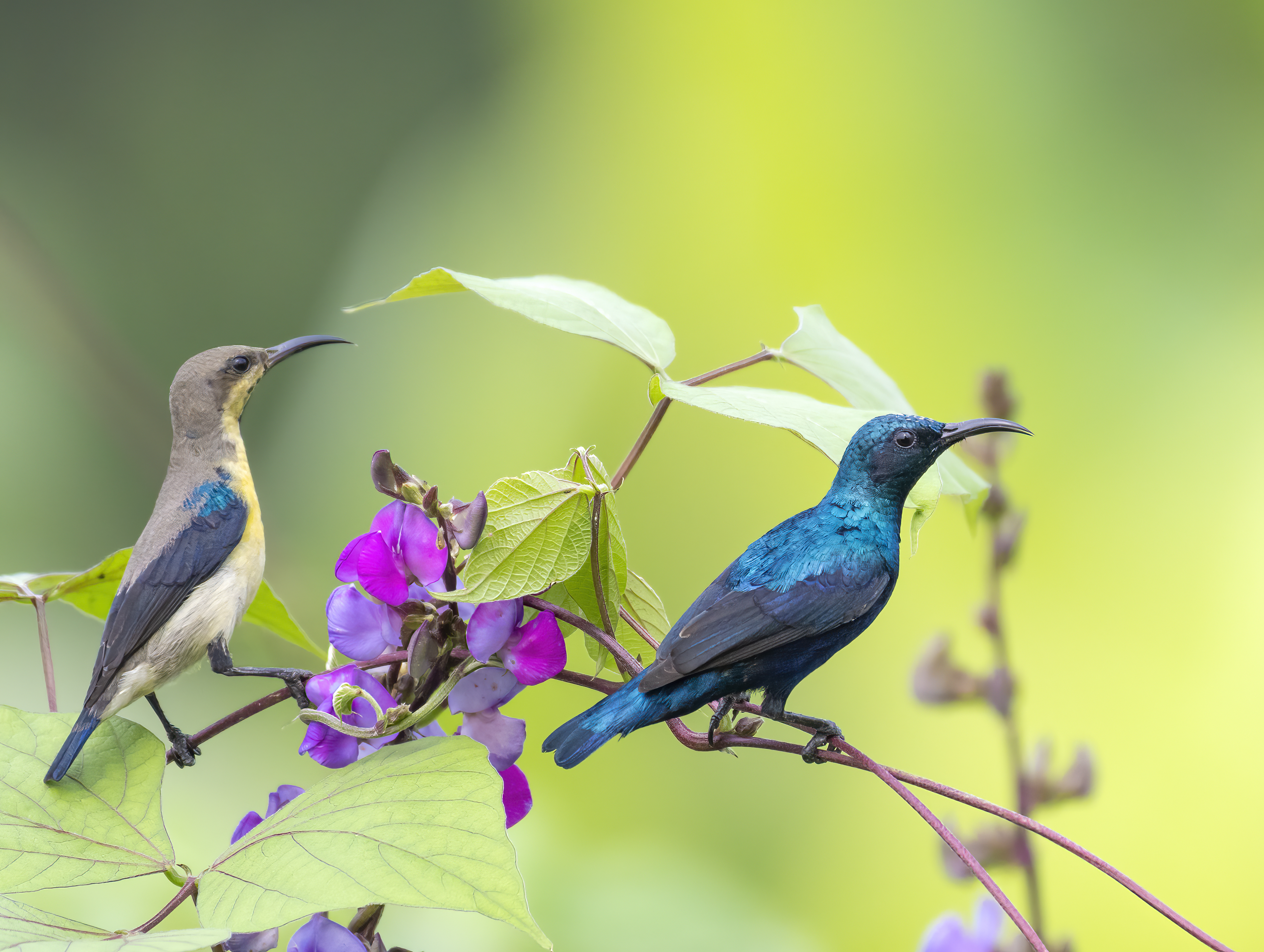
Males in non-breeding plumage (left) and breeding plumage (right)

The purple sunbird has a relatively short bill, a dark and short square ended tail with distinctive sexual dimorphism. Less than 10 cm (3.9 in) long they have a down-curved bill with brush-tipped tubular tongues that aid in nectar feeding. The male is glossy metallic bluish to purplish black on the upper parts with the wings appearing dark brown. The breeding male also has underparts of the same purplish black, but non-breeding males may show a central streak of black on yellow underparts. In the breeding plumage, the male can be confused with the syntopic Loten's sunbird which has a longer, more downcurved bill, lacks a supercilium, and has a distinctive broad maroon band on the breast. Breeding males will sometimes show their yellow pectoral tufts in displays. There is a patch of bright blue on the shoulder of breeding males. The maroon shine on the feathers of the collar around the neck is visible mainly during the breeding seasons.

Females are olive brown above with a yellowish underside. There is a pale supercilium beyond the eye. There is a darkish eye stripe. The throat and breast are yellow, becoming pale towards the vent. The outer tail feathers are tipped in white both in the male and female. The young are just like females in plumage, however, the males get black feathers as they become adults. They are seen in pairs or small groups and aggregations may be found in gardens with suitable flowers. They feed mainly on nectar but also take fruits and insects. Groups of as many as 40 to 50 individuals have sometimes been noted.

== Distribution and habitat ==
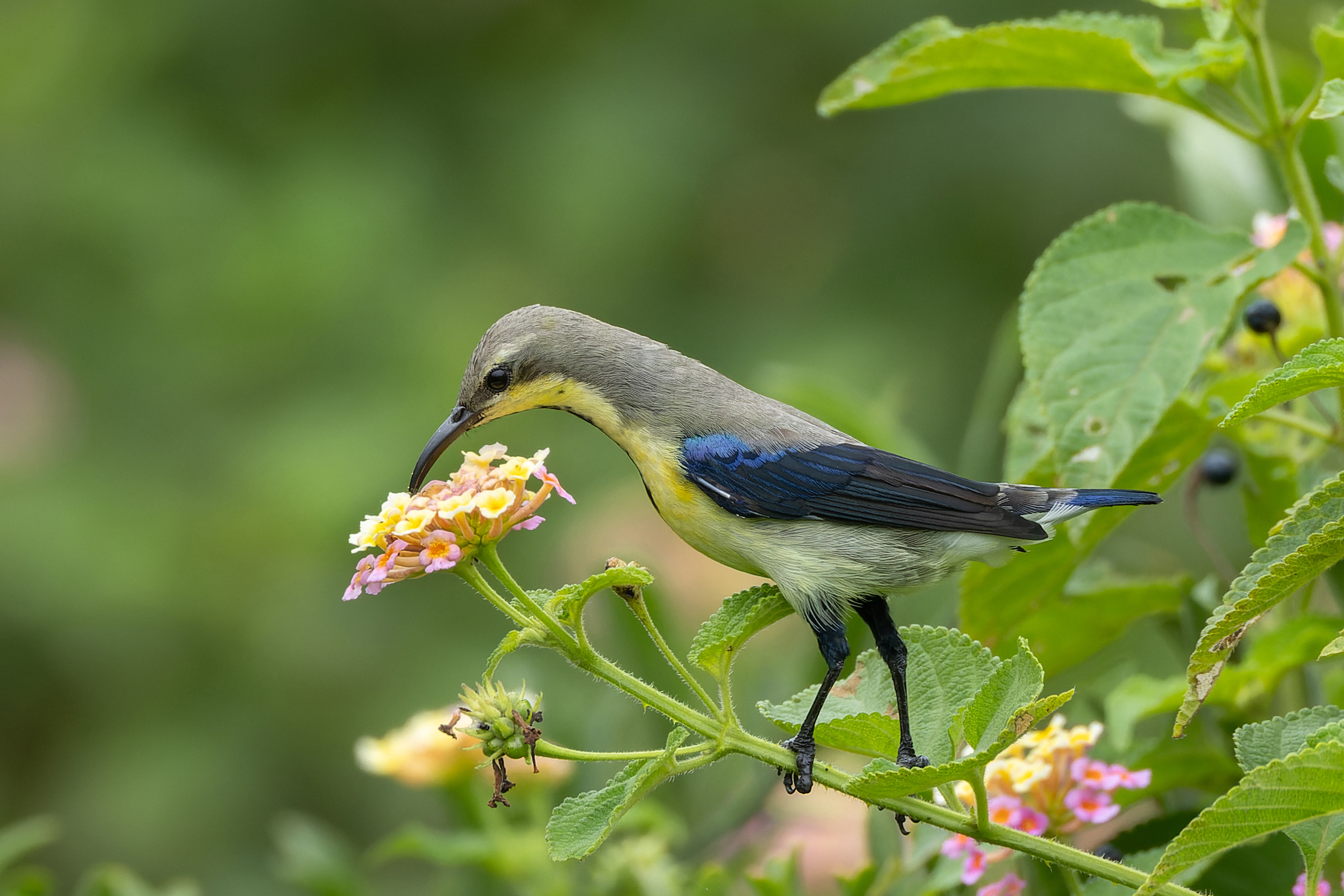
Male in non-breeding plumage feeding on Lantana camara in Maharashtra, India

The species is distributed widely from West Asia through the Indian subcontinent and into Southeast Asia. They are resident birds in most parts of their range and do not move large distances. They are found in thin forest and garden land, including those in dense urban areas. Local movements are, however, noted especially in the drier parts of northwestern India and Pakistan where they are said to arrive in large numbers before summer.

The nominate subspecies is distributed in India east of the desert region and south of the Himalayas extending to the west and south of India and Sri Lanka. It mainly inhabits the plains but going up to 2,400 m (7,900 ft) in southern India and up to 1,700 m (5,600 ft) in the Himalayas. The race brevirostris is found in the dry zone from the Arabian Peninsula into Iran, Afghanistan, Pakistan until the dry zone of Rajasthan and Gujarat. These may, however, winter south near Goa. This form has a slight tinge of green in the pectoral yellow tufts. The race intermedius extends from the border of Orissa and Andhra Pradesh northwards into Bangladesh, Myanmar and Indochina.

The movements of the purple sunbird is not well understood. A male ringed in Bharatpur was recovered in Dehra Dun about 350 km (220 mi) to the north.

== Behaviour and ecology ==
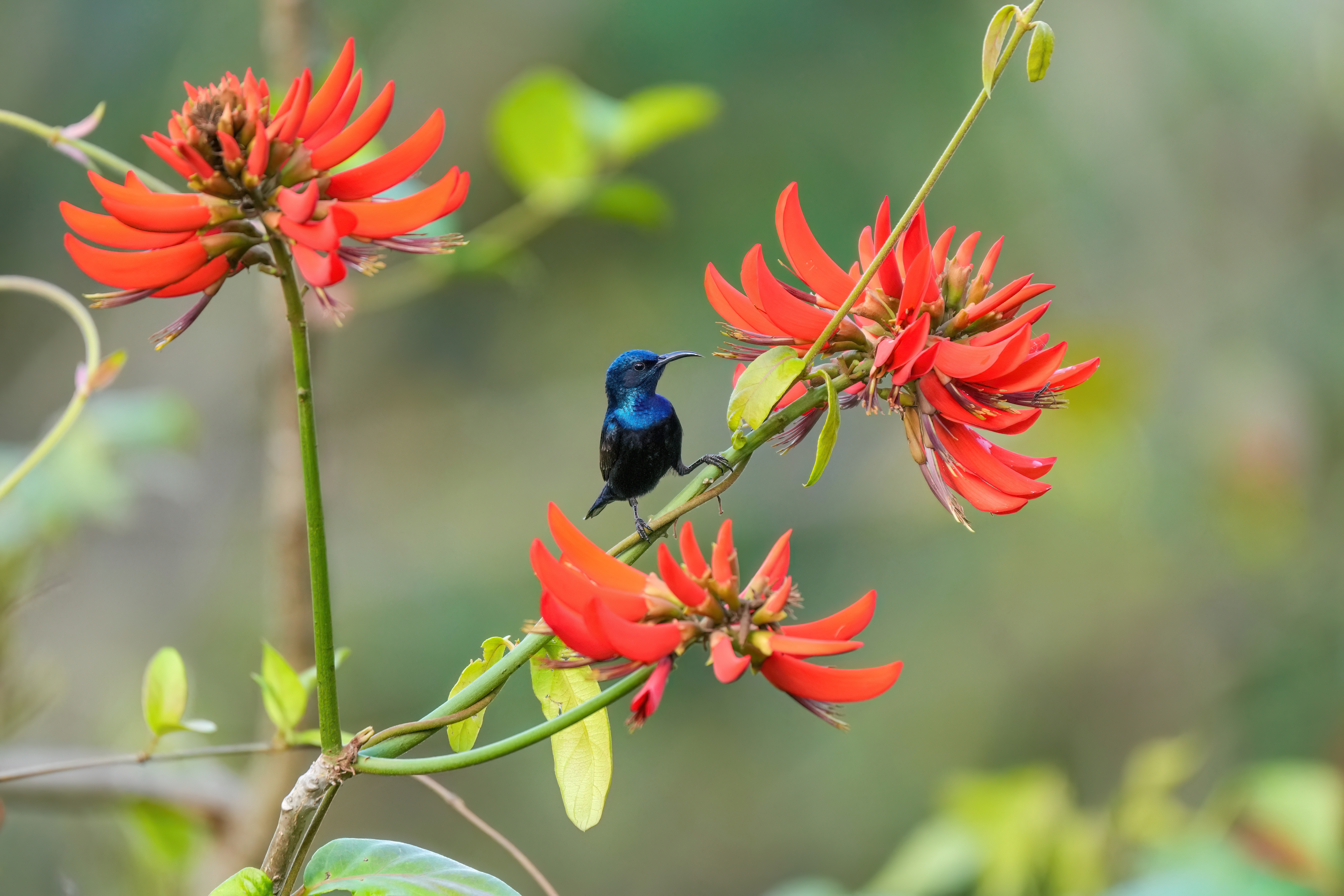
Male perching on an Indian coral tree (Erythrina variegata) in Jim Corbett National Park, India

These birds are very vociferous and will call and will join to mob owls or other predators. The song is rapid rattle followed by ringing, metallic notes. Other call notes include a "chwit" or "chwing!" notes. The primary breeding season is before the Monsoons, April to June in northern India and January to June in Sri Lanka. While feeding they flick their wings. They rarely hover at flowers and usually perch to forage for nectar. They are important pollinators of some plant species such as Butea monosperma, Acacia, Woodfordia and Dendrophthoe. but they sometimes steal nectar by slitting flowers such as Hamelia patens at the base. They are known to feed on small berries such as those of Salvadora persica and cultivated grapes. Insects are sometimes caught by flycatching.

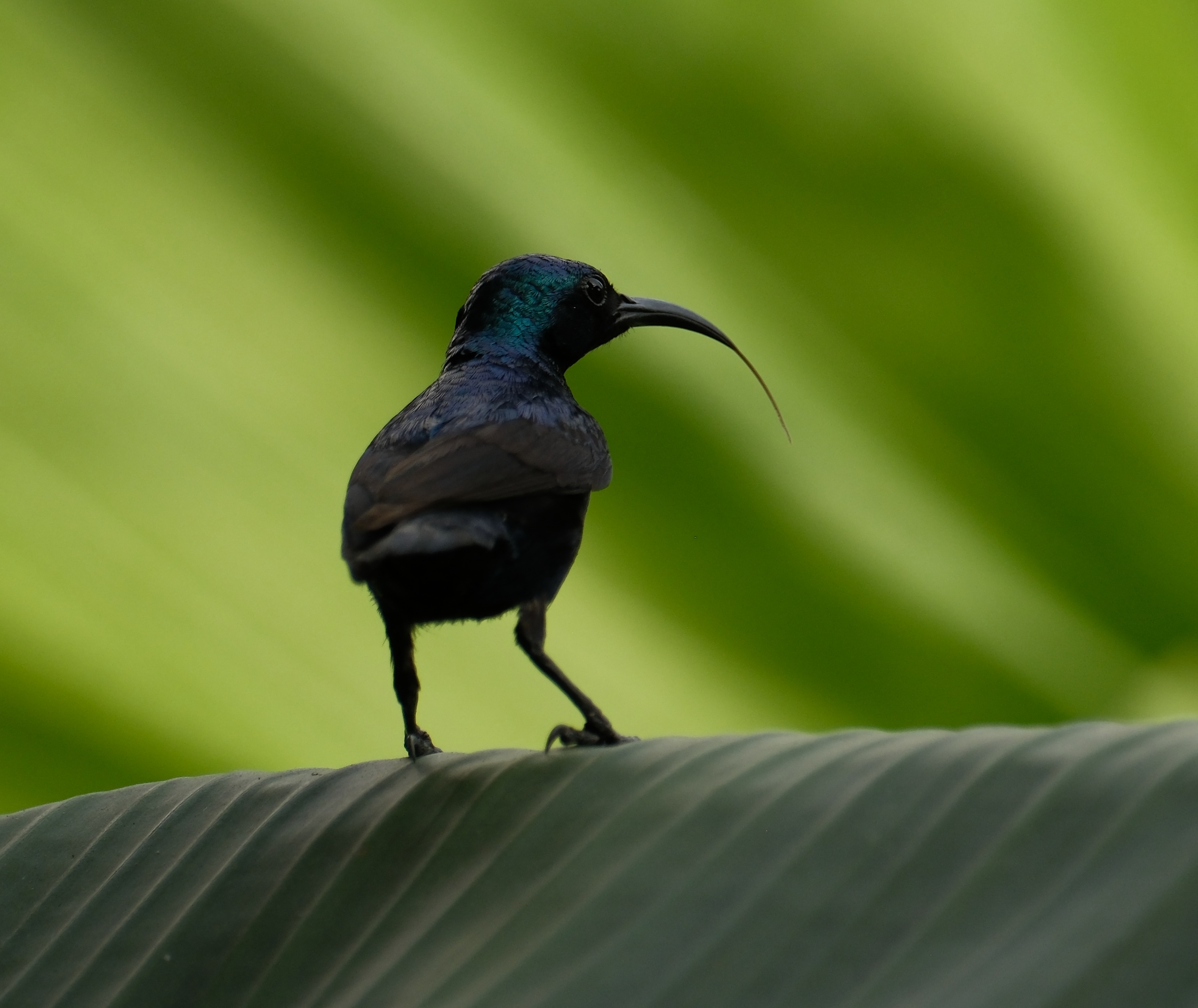
Purple sunbird with its tongue out

In courtship displays the male raises his head, fans his tail and flutters with partly open wings that expose the pectoral tufts and sings before the female. The nest is a pouch made of cobwebs, thin strips of vegetation, lichens and bark. The entrance hole on the side is often shaded by an overhanging projection. The nest is built almost entirely by the female. The nest material is not woven and most of it is held together by cobwebs. About five to ten days may be taken in the building of the nest. The inner cavity is expanded by the bird by opening its wing and turning around on the inside. In Sri Lanka and in southern India, it sometimes builds its nest by modifying and lining the cobweb structures formed by colonial or 'social' spiders, Stegodyphus sarasinorum (Eresidae). Two eggs are usually laid. The nest is usually suspended from a low branch, often of thorny plants but are sometimes built close to human habitations, attached to wires or other man-made objects and even indoors in an unused toilet. Only the female incubates the eggs which hatch after 15 to 17 days. Males assist in feeding the chicks although females involve themselves to a greater extent, making more trips as the chicks get older.

Sunbirds have been known to live for nearly 22 years in captivity.

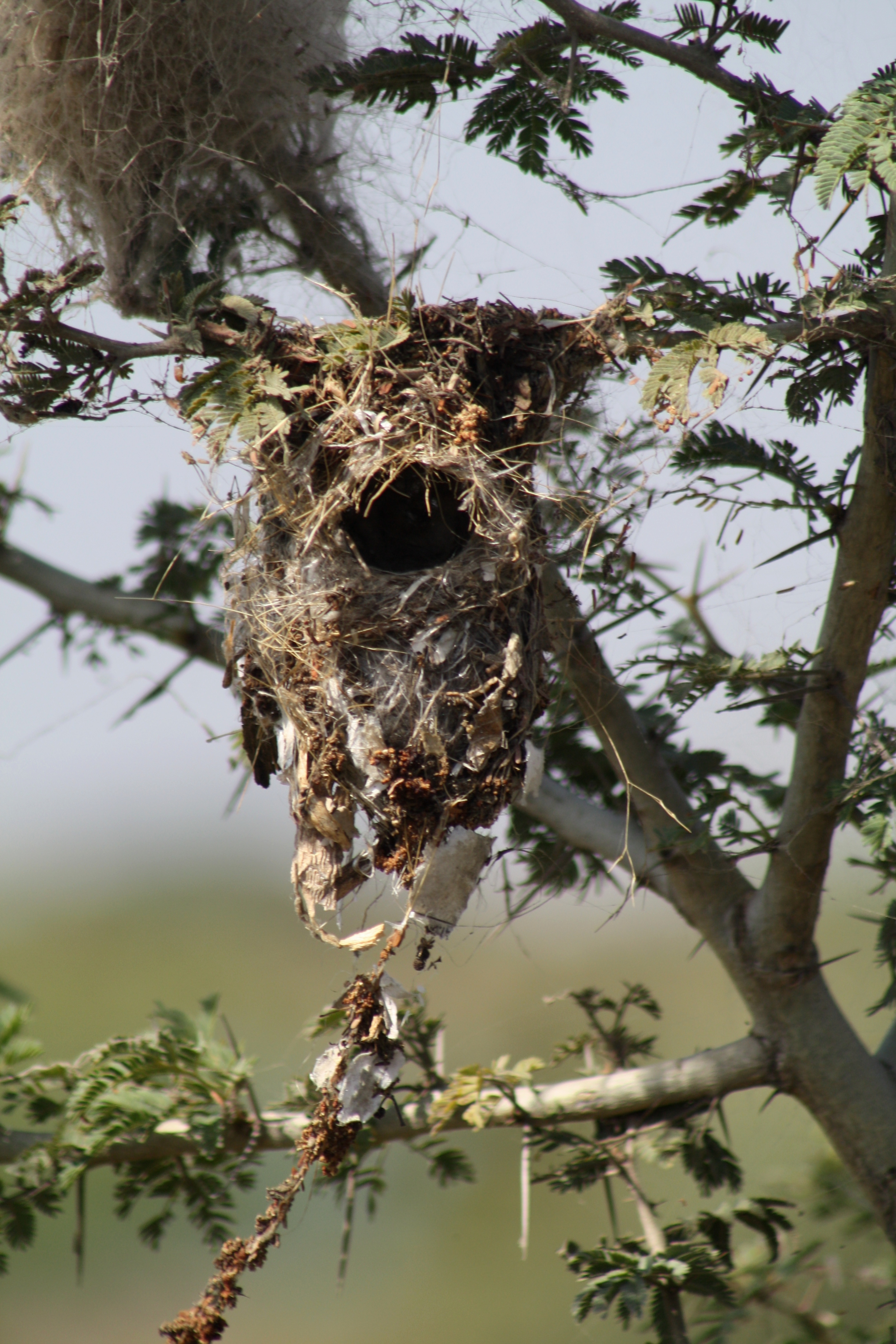
Nest

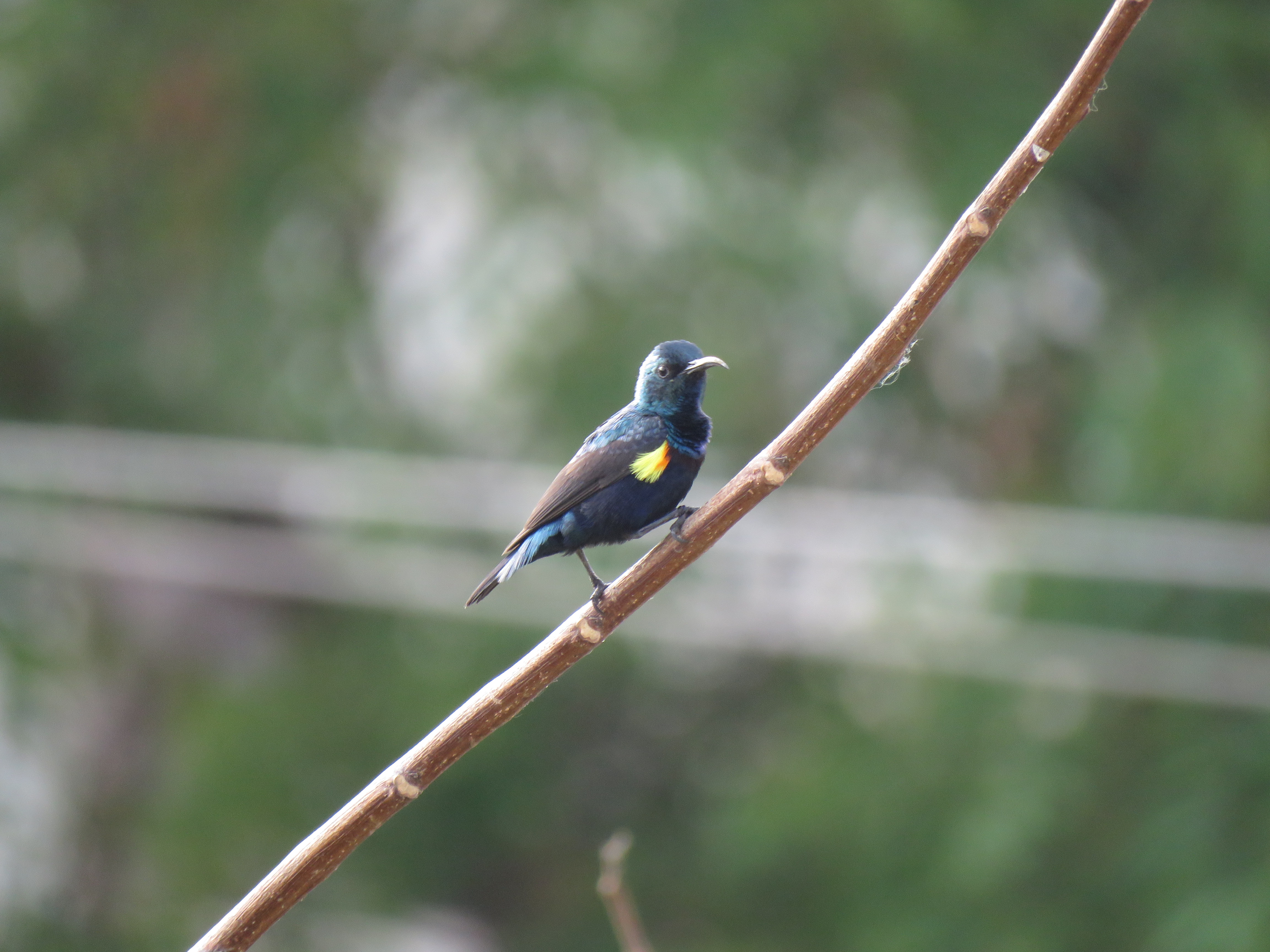
Male displaying yellow pectoral tufts
