= Bundibugyo Airport =

Airport in Uganda

- IATA: none; ICAO: HUBU

Summary
- Airport type: Public
- Owner: Bundibugyo Municipality
- Serves: Bundibugyo, Uganda
- Elevation AMSL: 3,100 ft (940 m)
- Coordinates: 0°40′15″N 30°01′35″E

Map
- Location of airport in Uganda

Runways
Direction	Length		Surface
Direction	m	ft	Surface
16/34	960	3,150	Grass
- Sources: OurAirports Google Maps

Bundibugyo Airport (ICAO: HUBU) is an airport serving the town of Bundibugyo in the Western Region of Uganda. It is 6 kilometres (3.7 mi) south-west of the town on the Fort Portal–Bundibugyo–Lamia Road.

== See also ==
- Transport in Uganda
- List of airports in Uganda
