= Philipp Oberländer =

Czech big game hunter, traveller and trophy hunter

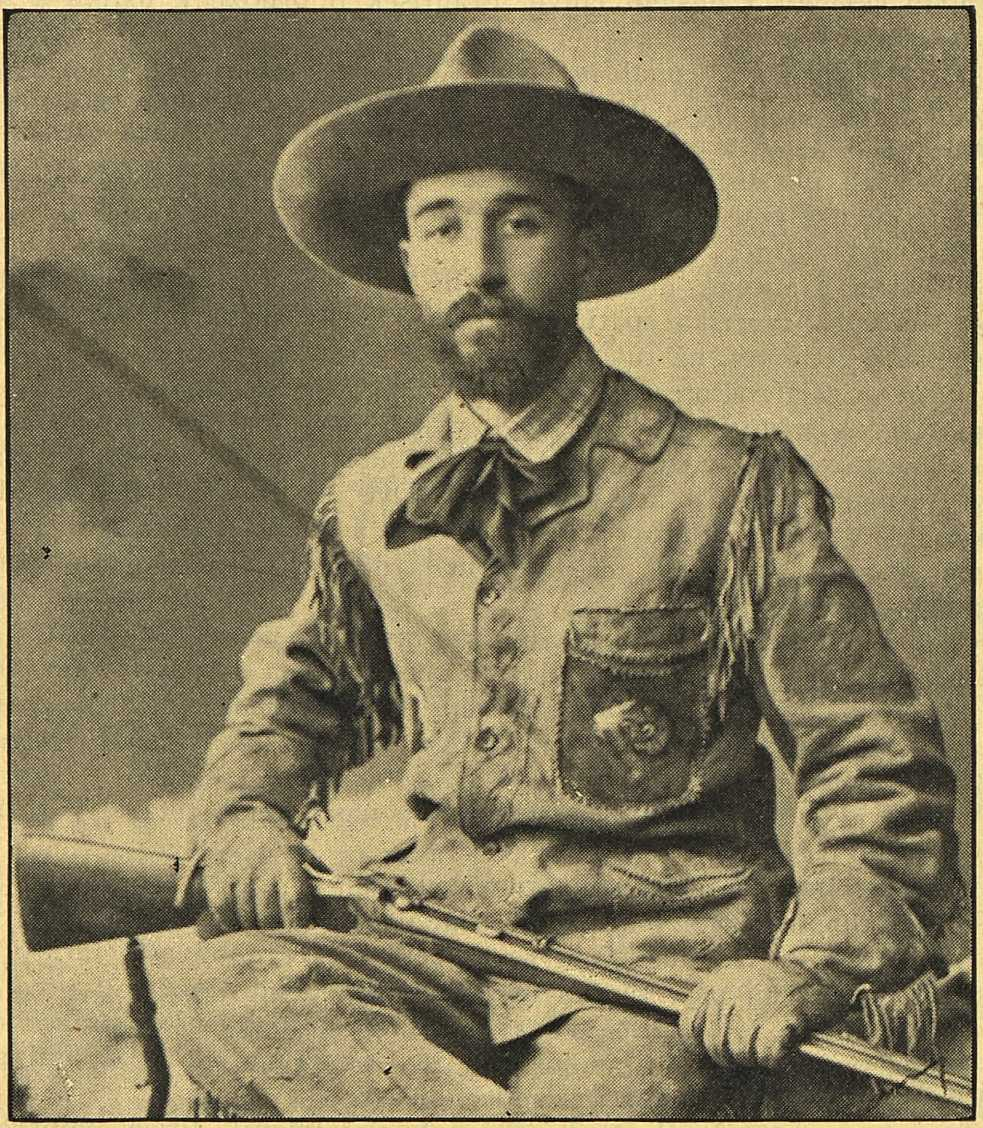

Philipp Jakob Oberländer (30 November 1875 – 3 March 1911) was a Czech big game hunter, traveller and trophy hunter. Born in a family of industrialists in Úpice, he made several expeditions around the world before he was killed by a cape buffalo in a hunting accident in the Sudan.

== Life and work ==
Oberländer was born in Úpice, Bohemia, Austria-Hungary to the German speaking Jewish industrialist family of Moritz Jakob (1831–1905) and Marie née Morawetz. The family owned a number of spinning mills. He took an interest in travel and adventure, becoming a pioneer of aviation in Bohemia. He supported the aviation pioneer Jan Kašpar and supported collecting expeditions including that of Rudolf Grauer (1870–1927). In 1903 he made a hunting expedition to India and Sri Lanka. In 1905 he went to the Americas. In 1906 he visited southeast Africa. In 1909 he visited Greenland along with Rudolf Kmunke (1866–1918) and Ludwig von Lorenz-Liburnau (1856–1943).

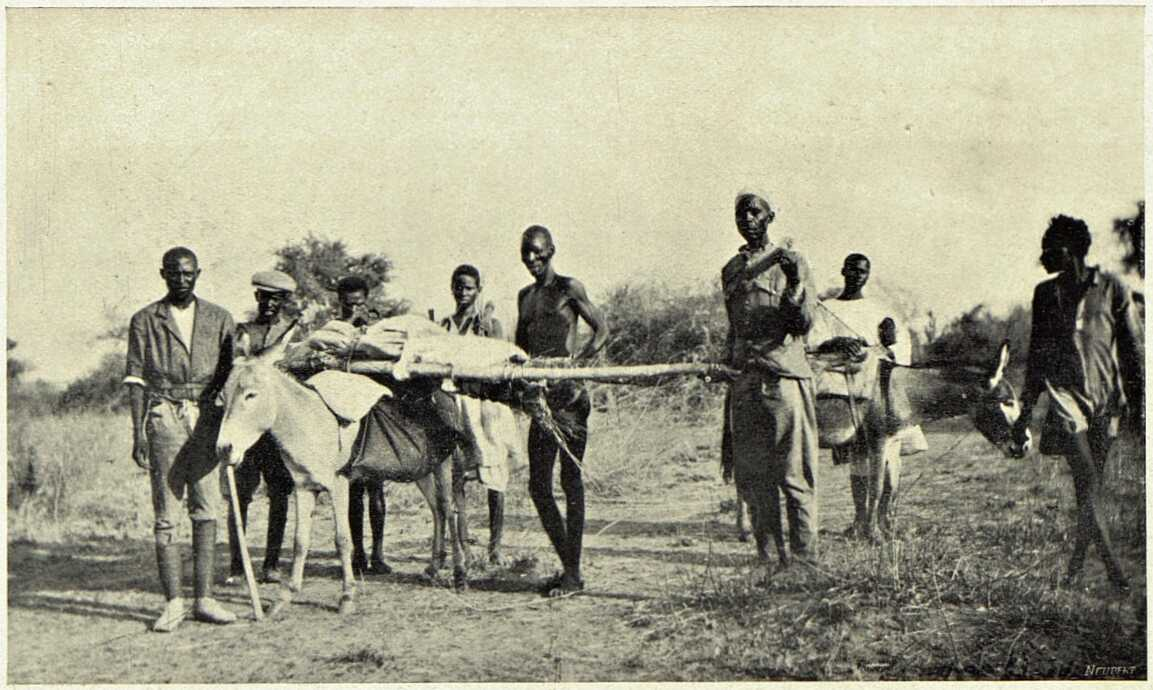
Oberländer's body being transported

In 1911, he was heading an expedition into South Sudan along with Richard Štorch (1877–1927) and Bedřich Machulka (1875–1954). On 3 March, he was hunting buffalo and he wounded one and followed the animal. He however forgot to load his gun and it attacked and trampled hum to death. He was buried at the military garrison of Mongalla. The remains were moved to Úpice in June 1912.

Oberländer's trophies and specimens were distributed to a number of museums including the Natural History Museum in Vienna. He wrote about his hunting expeditions in a book Jagdfahrten in Nordamerika (1910). Oberländer's ground thrush described from a specimen obtained by Rudolf Grauer was named after him in 1910.
