= Úpice =

- Town
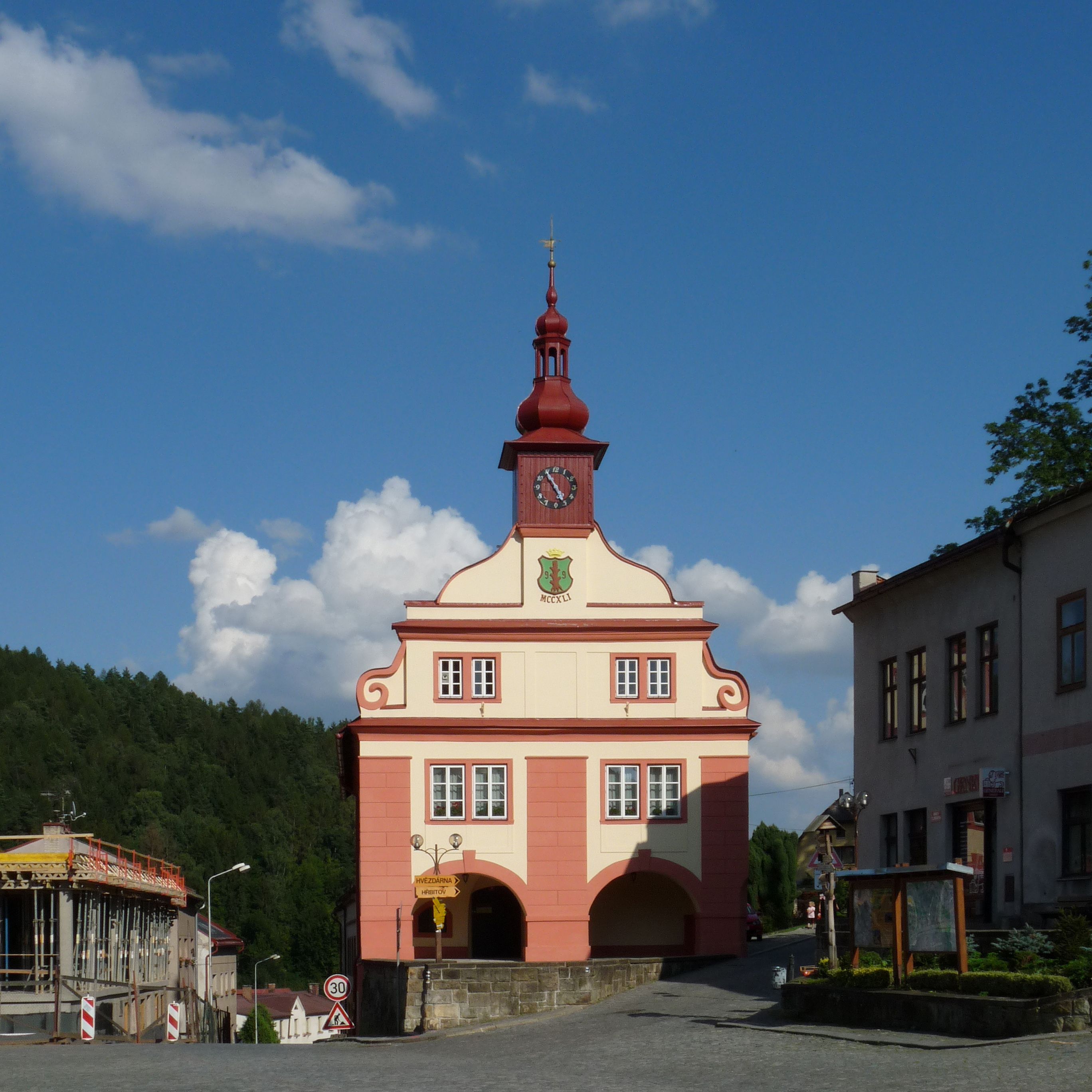
- Old Town Hall

- Flag Coat of arms

- Location in the Czech Republic
- Coordinates: 50°30′45″N 16°0′55″E
- Country: Czech Republic
- Region: Hradec Králové
- District: Trutnov
- First mentioned: 1358

Government
  - Mayor: Milan Vojtěch

Area
  - Total: 15.31 km^{2} (5.91 sq mi)
- Elevation: 352 m (1,155 ft)

Population (2026-01-01)
  - Total: 5,379
  - Density: 351.3/km^{2} (910.0/sq mi)
- Time zone: UTC+1 (CET)
  - Summer (DST): UTC+2 (CEST)
- Postal code: 542 32
- Website: www.upice.cz

Úpice (Czech pronunciation: [ˈuːpɪtsɛ]; German: Eipel) is a town in Trutnov District in the Hradec Králové Region of the Czech Republic. It has about 5,400 inhabitants. The town is located on the Úpa River in the Giant Mountains Foothills. The most important monument of Úpice is the Dřevěnka Inn, which is protected as a national cultural monument.

== Administrative division ==
Úpice consists of two municipal parts (in brackets population according to the 2021 census):

- Úpice (4,992)
- Radeč (346)

== Etymology ==
The name is a diminutive form of Úpa.

== Geography ==
Úpice is located about 9 kilometres (6 mi) southeast of Trutnov and 35 km (22 mi) northeast of Hradec Králové. It lies in the Giant Mountains Foothills. The highest point is at 508 m (1,667 ft) above sea level. The Úpa River flows through the town.

== History ==
It is proven that Úpice existed already in the 11th century, however the first written mention is from 1358. It was a small town until the second half of the 19th century, when the textile and machinery industries developed.

In 1975, the village of Radeč was joined to Úpice.

== Demographics ==
Historical population

Year	Pop.	±%
1869	2,957	—
1880	3,222	+9.0%
1890	4,156	+29.0%
1900	5,627	+35.4%
1910	7,672	+36.3%

Year	Pop.	±%
1921	6,757	−11.9%
1930	7,909	+17.0%
1950	6,277	−20.6%
1961	6,540	+4.2%
1970	6,749	+3.2%

Year	Pop.	±%
1980	6,990	+3.6%
1991	6,141	−12.1%
2001	5,932	−3.4%
2011	5,713	−3.7%
2021	5,338	−6.6%

Source: Censuses

== Transport ==
The I/14 road (the section from Trutnov to Náchod) runs through the town.

== Sights ==
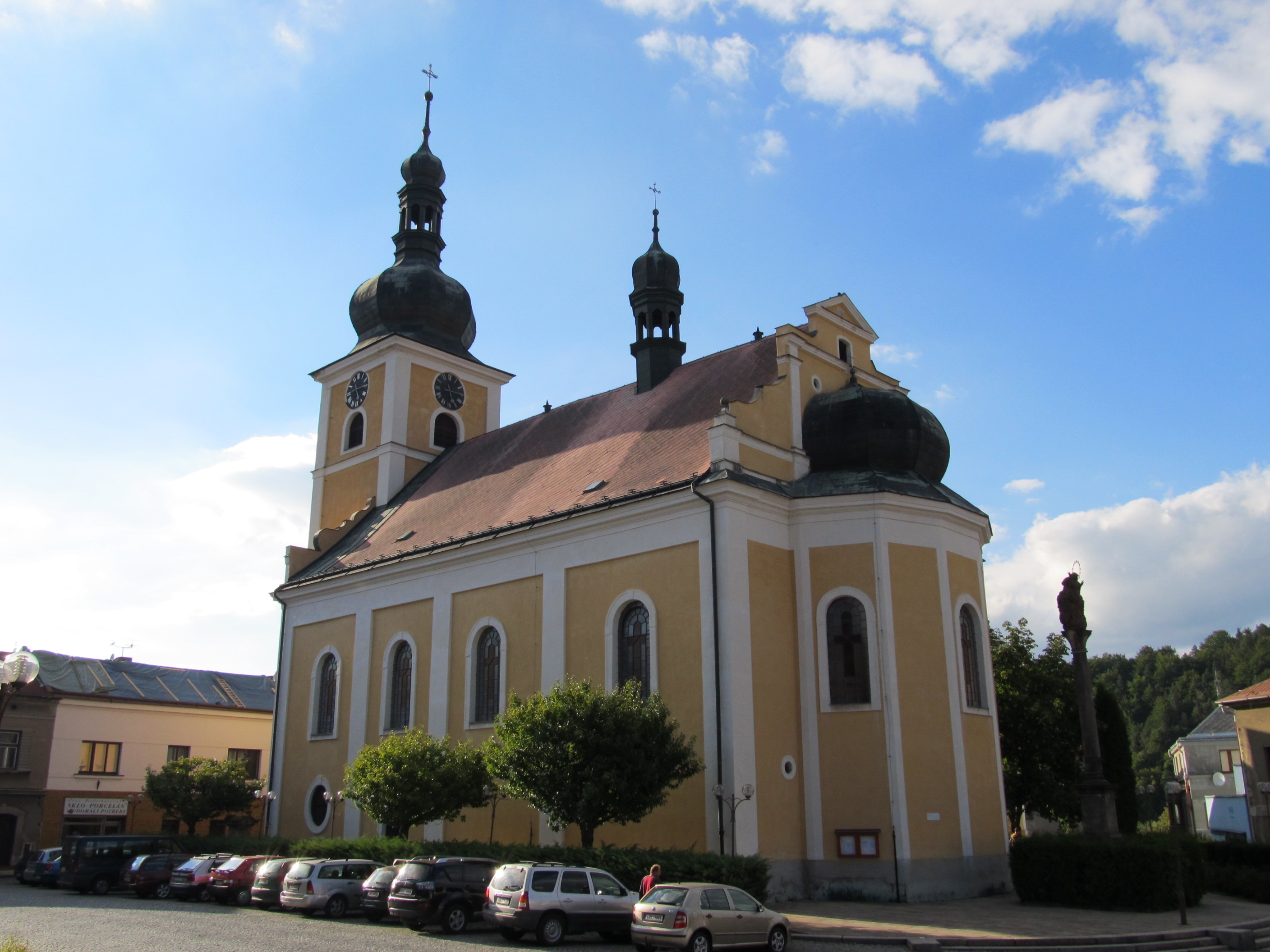
Church of the Saint James the Great

The Church of the Saint James the Great was built in 1698–1705, after the old wooden church from the 14th century was burned down in 1625. The altar from 1730 includes an image of Saint James the Great painted by Petr Brandl.

The most valuable monument is Dřevěnka Inn. It is an excellently preserved half-timbered house from the beginning of the 17th century. It is a former homestead, which served as an inn from 1739 to 1990. Since 2018, it has been a museum. The house is protected as a national cultural monument.

A notable building is the Old Town Hall. It is an early Baroque house, built in 1677–1678. The tower was added in 1752. Since the 1960s, it has been used as the town museum and art gallery. The gallery is named after a local native, painter Julie Winterová-Mezerová, whose paintings are exhibited here.

== Notable people ==
- Philipp Oberländer (1875–1911), hunter and traveller
- Josef Čapek (1887–1945), artist and writer; lived here
- Karel Čapek (1890–1938), writer; lived here
- Julie Winterová-Mezerová (1893–1980), painter
- Richard Sacher (1942–2014), politician

== Twin towns – sister cities ==
Úpice is twinned with:

- Piechowice, Poland
