= Julie Winterová-Mezerová =

Czech painter (1893–1908)

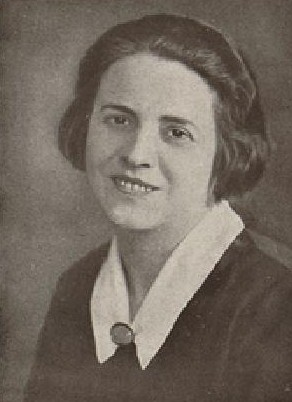
- Winterová-Mezerová before 1933
- Born: Julie Winterová; 28 February 1893; Úpice, Bohemia, Austria-Hungary
- Died: 2 May 1980 (aged 87); Trutnov, Czechoslovakia
- Occupation: painter

Julie Winterová-Mezerová (28 February 1893 – 2 May 1980) was a Czech painter.

She was born on 28 February 1893 in Úpice, Bohemia, Austria-Hungary (present-day Czech Republic). She married architect Alois Mezera in 1919

Mezerova donated a collection of her paintings to the Božena Němcová museum in Česká Skalice. The museum and art gallery in her home town of Úpice, housed in the 17th-century former town hall, is named the Městské muzeum a galerie J. W. Mezerové ('J. W. Mezerová Municipal Museum and Gallery') and holds 160 of her works donated by her nephew, Josef Bráblík.

Work by Winterová-Mezerová was included in the 1937 exhibition Les femmes artistes d'Europe, held in the Jeu de Paume in Paris.
