= Moriz Sassi =

Austrian ornithologist

- Born: 13 June 1880; Vienna
- Died: 25 September 1967 (aged 87)
- Education: University of Vienna
- Occupation: Ornithologist
- Known for: Work at the Natural History Museum in Vienna
- Title: Hofrat
- Parent(s): Eugen and Ida Sassi

Moriz Sassi or Moritz Sassi (13 June 1880 – 25 September 1967) was an Austrian ornithologist who worked at the Natural History Museum in Vienna. In 1933 he was made a government councilor and given the title of hofrat.

== Life and work ==
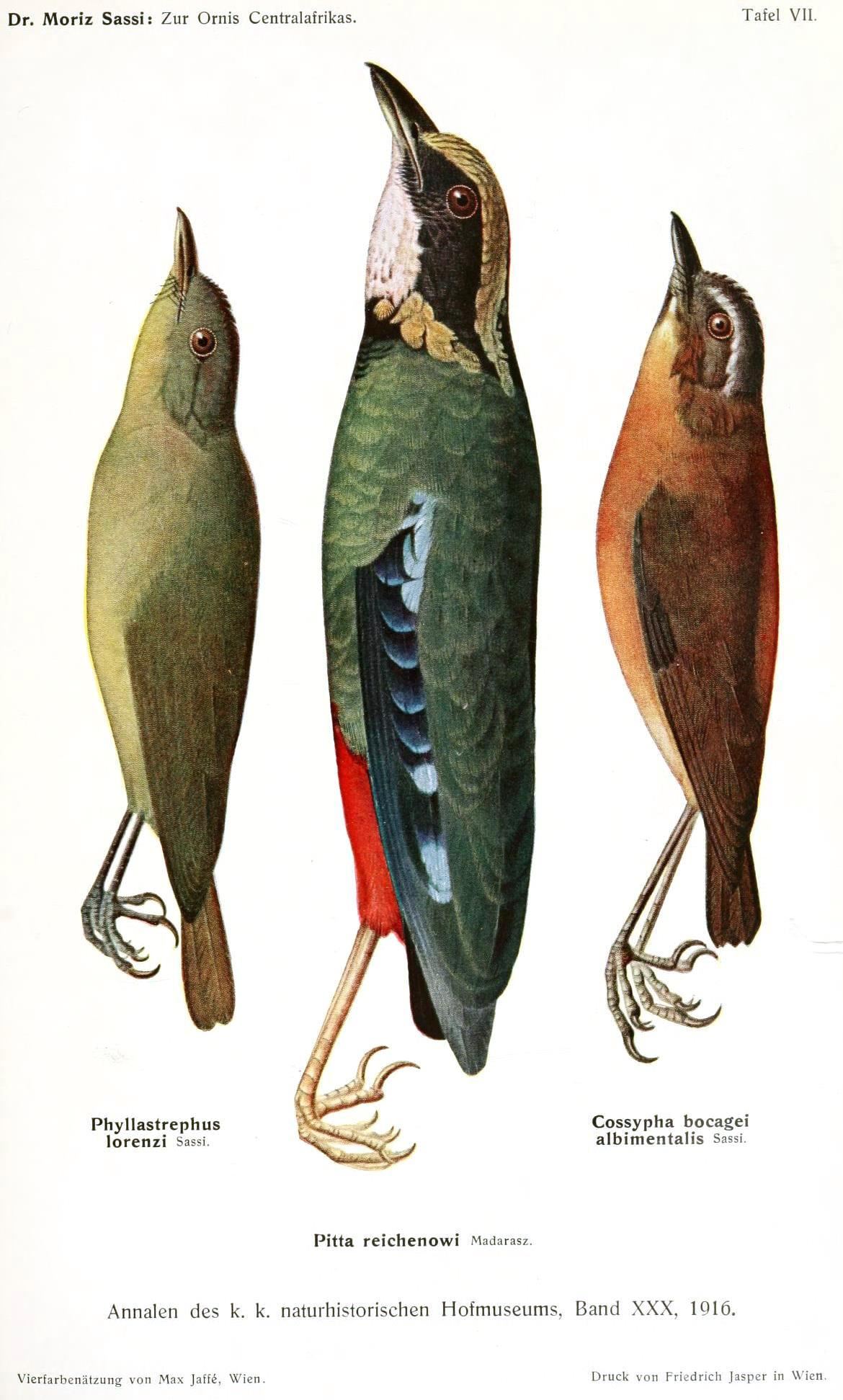
Illustrations of Central African birds described by Sassi in Beitrag zur Ornis Zentralafrikas (Contribution to Central African Ornithology; 1912)

Sassi was born in Vienna to Eugen and Ida who owned the Schwindgasse palace in Vienna and Villa Sassi in northern Italy. Sassi went to school at Hegelgasse and volunteered with the Dragoons. He then studied zoology at the University of Vienna under Karl Grobben and Berthold Hatschek writing a dissertation on the anatomy of Anomia ephippium for which he received a doctorate in 1903. He then followed an interest in art. In 1905 he joined an expedition into Anglo-Egyptian Sudan led by Franz Werner and collected numerous specimens of birds and mammals, and describing several as new to science including Procavia slatini (now merely a synonym for the rock hyrax) dedicated to his friend Rudolf Slatin. In 1908 he joined the Natural History Museum in Vienna under Franz Steindachner and trained under Ludwig Lorenz von Liburnau. During World War I, he was sent to the South East Front and saw action in the battle for Lovćen River in Montenegro. In 1920 he became a paid scientific assistant and began to work on the collection of Emil Weiske (1867-1950). This was followed by examination of the collections made by Steindachner in Brazil, Viktor Pietschmann and Selim Hassoun in Mesopotamia, and those by Rudolf Grauer in East Africa. He also joined some expedition including to Dalmatia and Costa Rica. He organized a meeting of the German Ornithological Society in Vienna in 1932. During the war years, he ensured that the bird collections were safely stored at the Schönbrunn Palace. He became a government councillor in 1933 and a court councillor in 1948. Sassi retired in 1949.

Several taxa were named in his honour by his fellow ornithologists including Serinus flavivertex sassii by Oscar Neumann and Accipiter minullus sassii by Erwin Stresemann. A genus Sassius was created by Walter Rothschild, 2nd Baron Rothschild and Ernst Hartert in 1926 for a purported Hawaiian honeycreeper Sassius simplex which was later identified to be based on a fake composite specimen.
