= Lamia River =

River in Bundibugyo District, Uganda

Location
- Country: Uganda; Democratic Republic of the Congo
- District: Bundibugyo District

Physical characteristics
- Source: Rwenzori Mountains (Rwenzori snowfields)
- Mouth: Semliki River

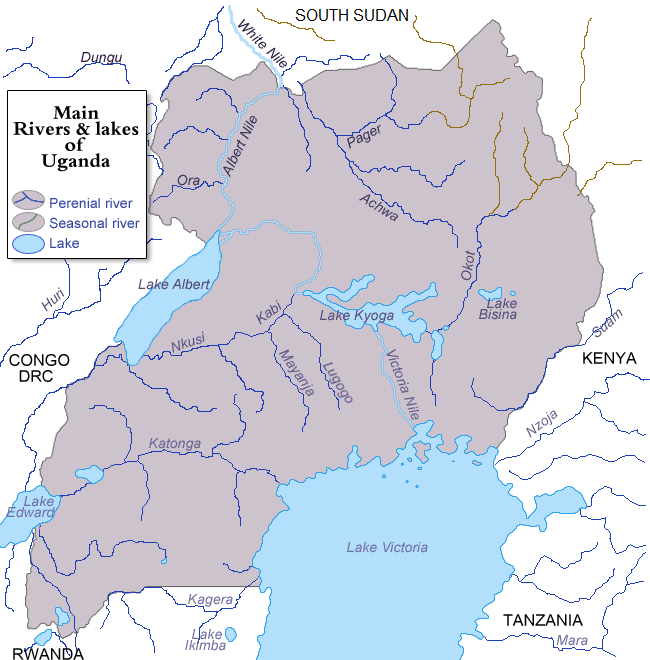
Rivers and lakes of Uganda, Lamia not shown in western Uganda where it joins the Semuliki River (not labeled)

Lamia River is a river in western Uganda in Bundibugyo District. It flows near the Semuliki National Park.

== Course and drainage ==
Lamia River and the Lower Semuliki drainage flow westwards from the Rwenzori snowfields into the Lower Semuliki area.

A boundary description in the Constitution of Uganda (1967) places the international boundary along the thalweg of the Lamia River downstream to the junction with the Semuliki River, then along the Semuliki River to Lake Albert.

In the Semuliki River catchment context, Lamia River and the Lower Semuliki reach form part of the international boundary between Uganda and the DRC.

== Protected areas and ecology ==
Semuliki National Park lies in the Semuliki Valley, with the Semuliki River forming the international boundary to the north, and the Lamia River bordering the park to the west.

National Forestry Authority summaries of the park also describe Semuliki National Park as bordering the Semliki and Lamia Rivers.

== Water resources management ==
The WWF-supported Semuliki River Catchment and Water Resources Management Project identified the Lamia River and Lower Semuliki area as a priority sub-catchment during early scoping for catchment interventions.

== See also ==
- River Kafu
- Kagera River
- Katonga River
