= Semliki River =

River in Democratic Republic of the Congo

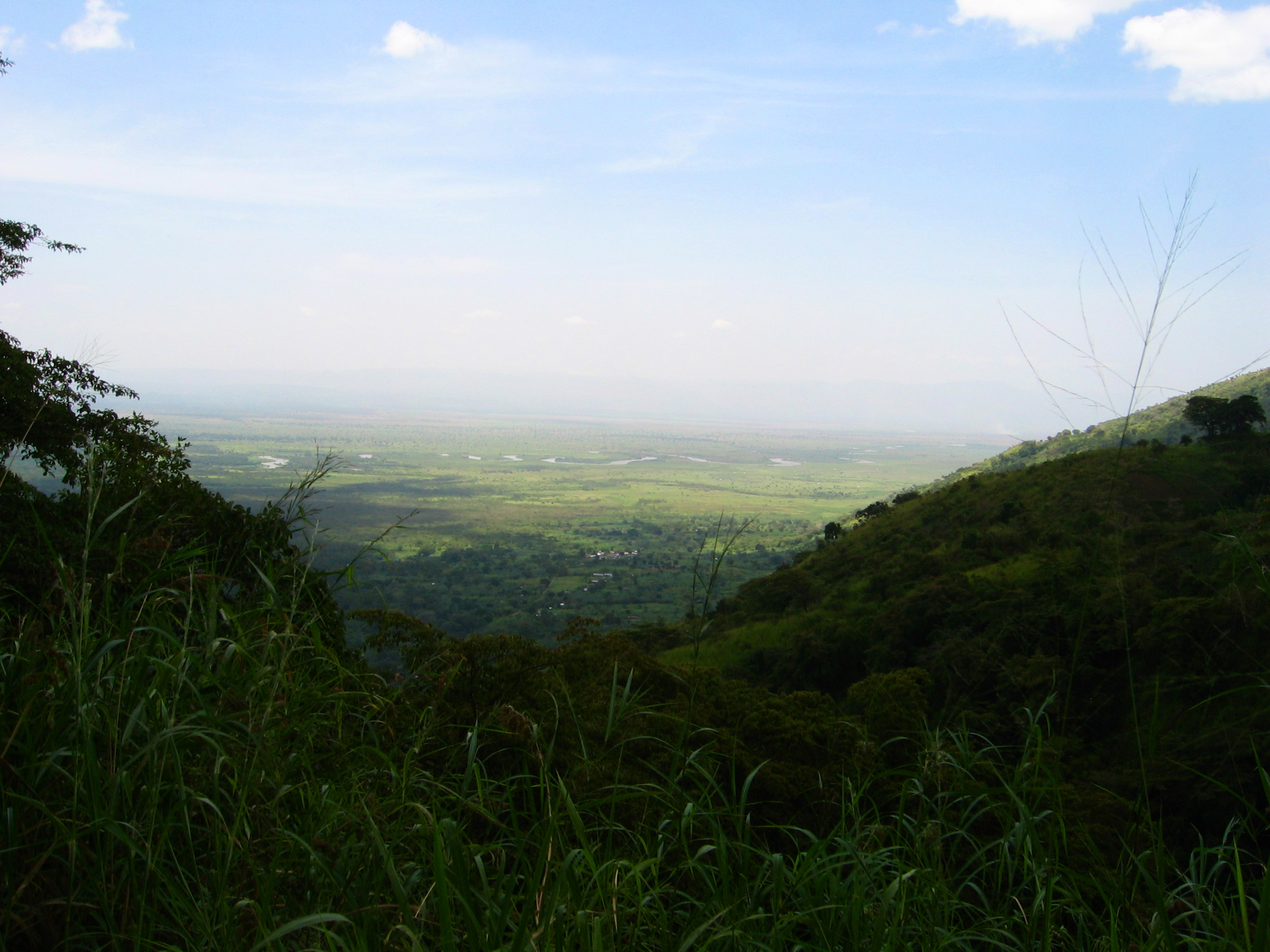

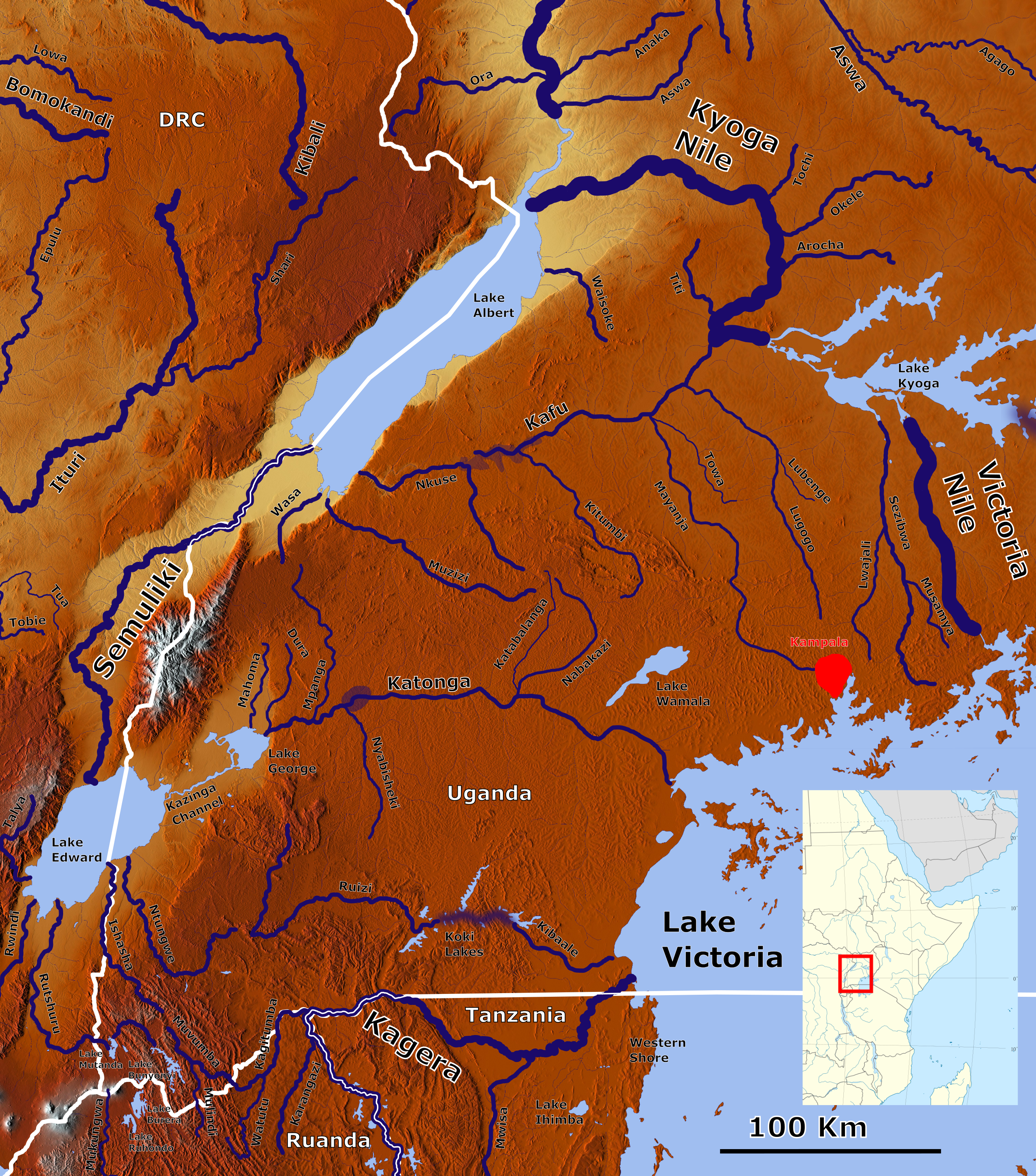
- Rivers of south west Uganda with the Semliki (center left).

Location
- Countries: DR Congo (DRC); Uganda

Physical characteristics
- Source: Lake Edward
  - location: Ishango, DRC, North Kivu Province
  - coordinates: 00°08′25″S 29°36′04″E
  - elevation: 997 m (3,271 ft)
- Mouth: Lake Albert
  - location: southeast of Bunia, DRC, Ituri Province
  - coordinates: 01°15′45″N 30°27′46″E
  - elevation: 619 m (2,031 ft)
- Length: 313 km (194 mi) 140 km (87 mi)
- Basin size: 35,087.6 km^{2} (13,547.4 mi^{2})
- Discharge
  - location: Near mouth
  - average: (Period: 1971–2000)238.8 m^{3}/s (8,430 cu ft/s)

Basin features
- River system: Nile River
- Tributaries
  - left: Taiya
  - right: Lamia, Ndugutu, Nyahuka, Kirumia

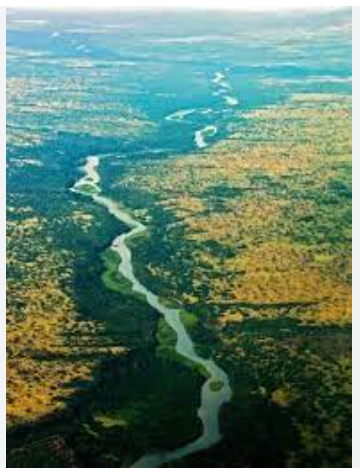
The Aerial view of River semliki

Semliki River (French: Rivière Semliki) is a major river, 140 kilometres (87 mi) long, in the Democratic Republic of the Congo (DRC) and Uganda in Central and East Africa. It flows north from Lake Edward in Beni Territory, Nord-Kivu, DRC avoiding the Rwenzori Mountains on its Right (East), emptying into Lake Albert in the Albertine Rift, Irumu Territory, Ituri Province, DRC overlooking the Blue Mountains to its left in the west. Its mouth is near the Village of Katolingo in Kanara subcounty, Ntoroko district, Uganda. Along its lower reaches, it meanders extensively forming part of the international border between the DRC and the western Ugandan districts of Bundibugyo and Ntoroko, near the Semuliki National Park.

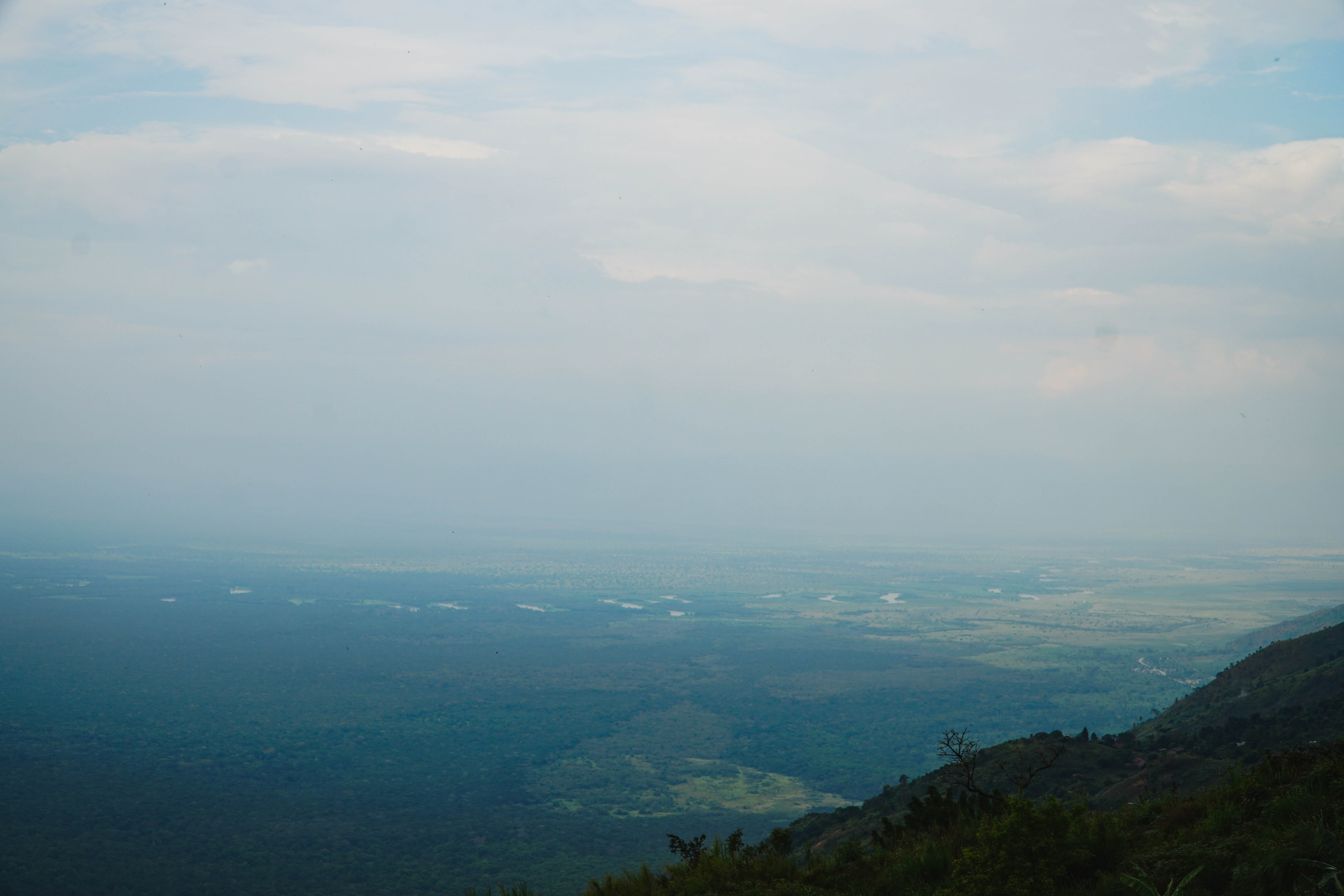
View of Semiliki River in DRC

Increasing snow melt from the Rwenzoris, overgrazing, and other alterations to the watershed have caused bank erosion and frequent changes to the course of the meandering lower reaches of the river. In some places, Uganda is losing up to 10 metres (33 ft) of land per year on its side of the river to erosion and silt from the Semliki is gradually filling in the southern end of Lake Albert. In other places, it is the DRC that is losing territory as the changing river course alters the apparent location of the border.

== Course ==
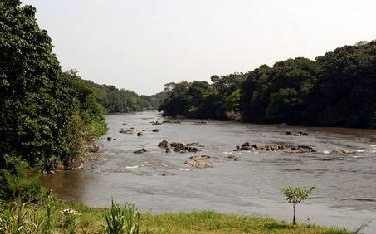
River semliki -A border to Uganda and the DRC- 140 kilometres (87 mi) long, in the Democratic Republic of the Congo (DRC) and Uganda in Central and East Africa.Increasing snow melt from the Rwenzoris, overgrazing, and other alterations to the watershed have caused bank erosion and frequent changes to the course of the meandering lower reaches of the river

The Semliki begins near Ishango (DRC) at the northern end of Lake Edward and soon enters Virunga National Park, through which it flows over much of its upper course. The A-109 road between Mpondwe (Uganda) and Beni (DRC) is on the right, sometimes nearby and sometimes at a distance, as the river meanders through the park. Slightly southeast of Beni, the river passes under the A-109 road and continues north. At this point, the stream is west of Mount Baker (Kiyanja) in Rwenzori Mountains National Park in Uganda.

Before leaving the park, the river passes under another road linking the DRC settlement of Oicha to the settlements in the Semliki Valley west of the DRC–Uganda border and the Uganda town of Bundibugyo. Downstream of the road crossing, the river leaves the Virunga Park and runs along the west edge of Semuliki National Park (Uganda). Here the river becomes the border between the DRC and Uganda, and it remains the border for most of the rest of the river's course. As the river leaves Semuliki Park, it nears Sempaya National Park and the Toro Game Reserve, both in Uganda. Over its last reach, the river flows west of the international border and enters the southern end of Lake Albert at a point southeast of Bunia (DRC).

== People ==
The two main ethnic groups in the region are the Amba people (Baamba, Bwamba) and the Bakonjo (Konjo). People in the Semliki Valley include Batuku, pastoral cattle keepers whose herds graze on grasslands along the river. Small populations of Batwa (pygmies), who have traditionally been forest hunter-gatherers, also live in the valley.

== Flora and fauna ==
In Semliki National Park, the forest resembles that of the Congo River basin. Cynometra alexandri, a tropical tree species, dominates but is interspersed with other trees and swamp flora. Annual rainfall in this tropical forest averages 1,500 millimetres (59 in).

More than 400 bird species, including the forest ground-thrush, Sassi's olive greenbul, and nine species of hornbill frequent the park, as do over 490 species of butterflies. Among the mammals in the park are elephants, leopard, African golden cat, buffalo, hippopotami, duikers, and pygmy scaly-tailed flying squirrels.

Along its course, the Semliki falls about 300 m (1,000 ft) through a series of rapids, and this isolates Lake Edward's fish species, many of them found no-where else, from those found downriver in Lake Albert (and consequently the Nile).
