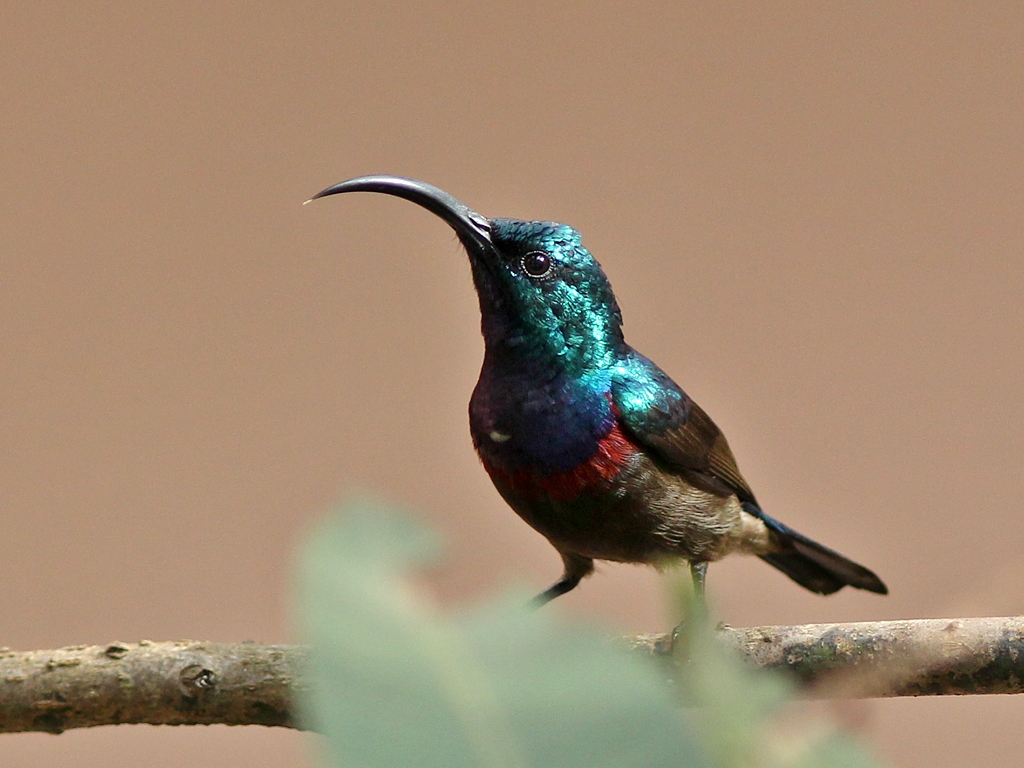
- Male with maroon breast band visible
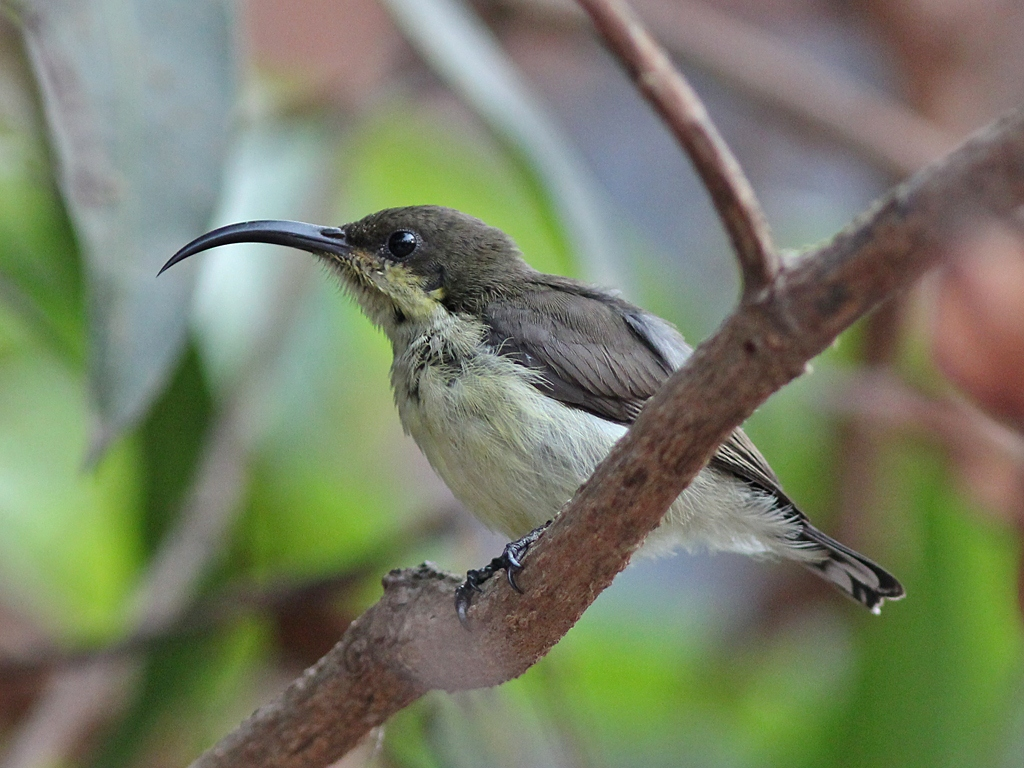
- Female

Conservation status
- Least Concern (IUCN 3.1)

Scientific classification
- Kingdom: Animalia
- Phylum: Chordata
- Class: Aves
- Order: Passeriformes
- Family: Nectariniidae
- Genus: Cinnyris
- Species: C. lotenius

Binomial name
- Cinnyris lotenius (Linnaeus, 1766)

Synonyms
- Certhia lotenia Linnaeus, 1766; Nectarinia lotenia (Linnaeus, 1766); Arachnechthra lotenia (Linnaeus, 1766)

= Loten's sunbird =

Species of bird

Loten's sunbird (Cinnyris lotenius), also known as the long-billed sunbird or maroon-breasted sunbird, is a sunbird endemic to peninsular India and Sri Lanka. Named after Joan Gideon Loten, who was the Dutch governor of colonial Ceylon, it is very similar to the purple sunbird that is found in the same areas and also tends to hover at flowers for nectar, but can be distinguished by the longer bill, the maroon band on the breast and brownish wings. Like other sunbirds, it is also insectivorous and builds characteristic hanging nests.

== Description ==
Loten's sunbirds are small, only 12–13 cm long. The long bill separates this from the syntopic purple sunbird. The wings are browner and the maroon breast band is visible on the male under good lighting conditions. The males have pectoral tufts of yellow mixed with crimson that are used in displays. The adult male is mainly glossy purple with a grey-brown belly. The female has yellow-grey upperparts and yellowish underparts, but lacks the purple's faint supercilium. The call is distinctive buzzy zwick zwick and they are also very active often bobbing their head while foraging. They long down-curved bills and brush-tipped tubular tongues, are adaptations to their nectar feeding. The bill lengths vary across populations with the longest bills are found on the east of Peninsular India and in Sri Lanka. The song of the male is a long repeated wue-wue-wue... with the last notes accelerated. The song has been likened to the call of the cinereous tit. The males may sing from the tops of bare trees or telegraph wires.

The male in winter has an eclipse plumage with a yellowish underside resembling that of the female but having a broad central streak of dark metallic violet from the chin to the belly. The existence of an eclipse plumage in the adult male has been questioned by Rasmussen & Anderton (2005) due to the lack of specimens in evidence. Jerdon noted however that:

A specimen in the Museum As. Soc., Calcutta, has the winter or currucaria plumage of the last, viz., a central glossy green stripe on the throat and breast, and a spot on the shoulders of the wings; otherwise as in the female. I do not recollect seeing the bird in this plumage in Malabar, where I had many opportunities of observing it, and rather think that it must have been a young bird.

— Jerdon, 1862

== Taxonomy ==
The name of the bird commemorates Joan Gideon Loten, the Dutch governor to Sri Lanka (Ceylon) who commissioned the artist Pieter Cornelis de Bevere to illustrate the natural history of the region from living and collected specimens. The plates by de Bevere included illustrations of many bird species and when Loten went back to England, he loaned these to various naturalists including George Edwards (1694–1773) who used them his Gleanings of Natural History. Carl Linnaeus described this species under the genus Certhia based on material obtained from Loten.

... described by Linnaeus in the Syst. Naturae, from specimens sent to him by General Loten, Governor of Ceylon, and named in honour of that gentleman, "Habitat in Zeylona. J. G. Loten p. m. Gubernat. Zeylon. qui hortum Botanicum primus in India condidit et tot raris avibus me aliosque dotavit."

— Sir William Jardine

Gmelin confused this with African species and many publications of that time include inaccurate information:

Certhia Lotenia, or Loten's creeper, is a native of Ceylon and Madagascar. It builds its nest of the down of plants, and is subjected to the hostility of a spider in those countries, nearly as large as itself, which pursues it with extreme ardour, and delights in sucking the blood of its young.

— Nicholsons British Encyclopedia, 1819

== Distribution and habitat ==
Found only in peninsular India and Sri Lanka. The main region is along the Western Ghats and into the southern peninsula. There are scattered records from central India and into the northern Eastern Ghats north until Orissa. Race hindustanicus, southern Peninsular populations of which have a slightly shorter bill, is found in India while the nominate race is found in Sri Lanka. They are locally common in both forests, cultivation. They are also common in urban gardens and in some areas such as the city of Madras, they are commoner than other sunbirds.

== Behaviour and ecology ==
The species is resident and no seasonal movements are known. While foraging for nectar they hover at flowers a lot unlike the purple sunbirds that prefers to perch beside flowers. Like other sunbirds, they also feed on small insects and spiders. It drinks from many garden plants as readily as wilder shrubs.

The breeding season is November to March in India, February to May in Sri Lanka. The nest is built by the female which may however be accompanied by the male. Two eggs are laid in a suspended nest in a tree. The eggs are incubated only by the female for about 15 days. The nest is a bag of webs, bark and caterpillar frass. The nest is built by the female and young are fed by both parents. Nests may sometimes be reused for a second brood. It often builds its nest within the nests of "social spiders" (Eresidae).

The nest is usually, not the little hanging structure made by most species, but placed in the large flocculent masses of cobweb spun in low bushes by a certain species of spider. In the interior of the mass the birds press out a more or less globular chamber, lining the walls with vegetable down, and generally providing a little cave of cobweb over the entrance, which is at one side. If spider's webs are not available, they appear on occasions to construct a little pear-shaped, hanging structure like that of the next species.

— W.E. Wait, 1912

Salim Ali notes that the species is exceptional among Indian sunbirds in not having cobwebs on the exterior. It usually lays 2 eggs, but very. rarely three, which are of a long ovoid shape. These eggs grayish-white, with streak-like spots of greyish brown, occasionally with green and purple tints. Sometimes more marks are found on the thick end.
