= Bundibugyo District =

- District
- District location in Uganda
- Coordinates: 00°43′N 30°04′E
- Country: Uganda
- Region: Western Uganda
- Sub-region: Rwenzori sub-region
- Capital: Bundibugyo

Area
  - Land: 848.2 km^{2} (327.5 sq mi)

Population (2012 Estimate)
  - Total: 261,700
  - Density: 308.5/km^{2} (799/sq mi)
- Time zone: UTC+3 (EAT)
- Website: bundibugyo.go.ug

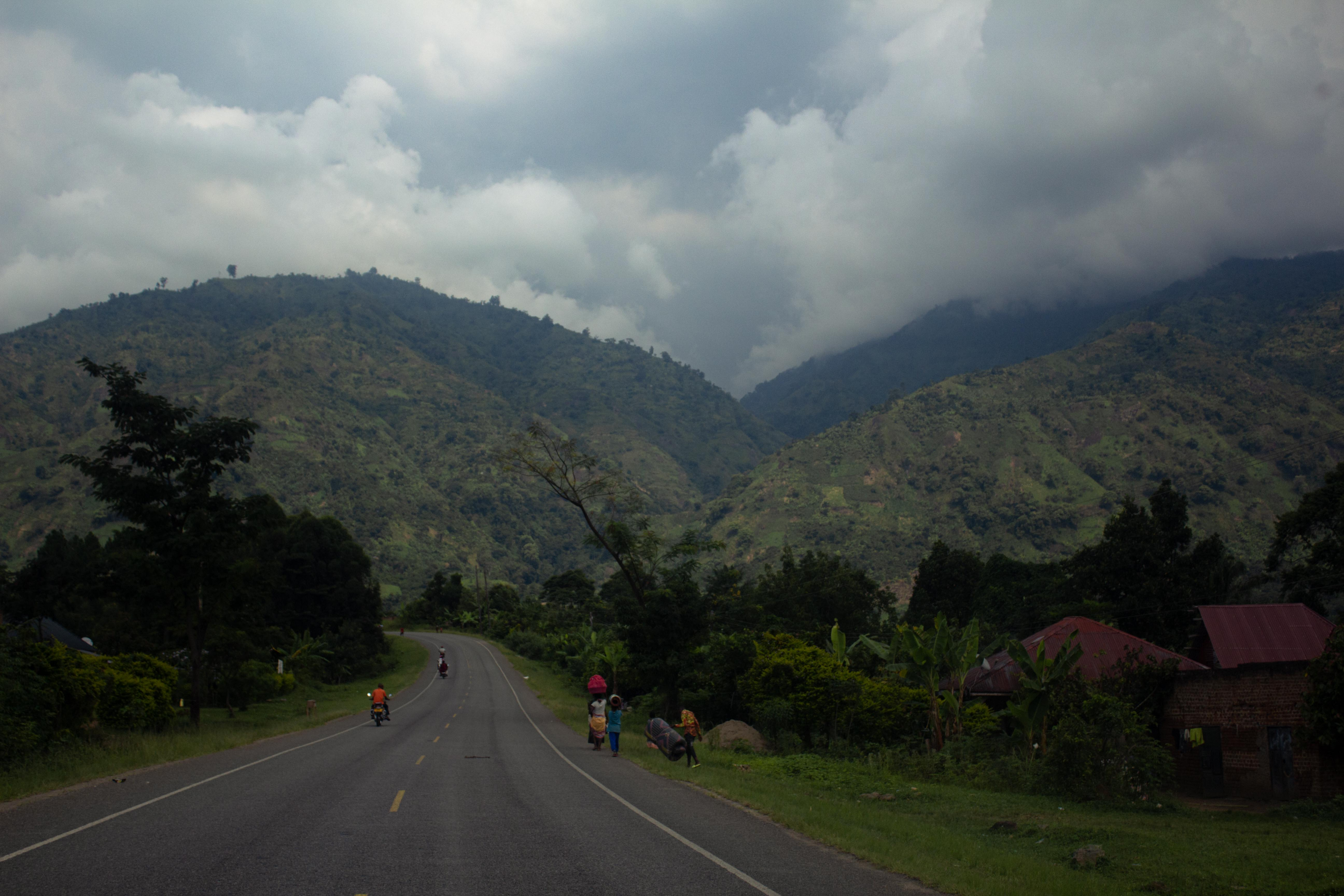
A home stands right below a part of the rift Valley in Bundibugyo, Uganda.

Bundibugyo District is a district in the Western Region of Uganda, bordering the Democratic Republic of the Congo (DRC). The town of Bundibugyo is where both the district headquarters and the Bwamba Kingdom seat (Obudhingiya Bwa Bwamba) are located. Before July 2010, the districts of Ntoroko and Bundibugyo were one. These districts are the only two in Uganda that lie west of the Rwenzori Mountains. Bundibugyo (With Ntoroko) was first named Semuliki district, separating it from the Greator Kabarole district alongside Rwenzori district (Kasese) in 1974.

== Location ==
Bundibugyo District is bordered by Karugutu, Uganda to the north, Ntoroko District to the northeast, Kabarole District to the east, Bunyangabu District to the southeast, Kasese District to the south and the DRC to the west and north. The district headquarters at Bundibugyo are located approximately 83.6 kilometres (51.9 mi), by road, west of Fort Portal city the capital of Rwenzori Sub-region. This is about 72 kilometres (45 mi), north of Kasese town but no motorable roads link Kasese and Bundibugyo districts because of the Rwenzori Mountains. Travellers between the two districts must go around the mountains via Bunyangabu, Kabarole, and Ntoroko districts, an approximate distance of 155 kilometres (96 mi), or via the DRC if they don't fly or walk over the Mountains.

== Overview ==
In the late 1990s, tens of thousands of civilians were displaced by the insurgency of the Allied Democratic Forces (ADF) who were operating in the district. In one raid on 7 April 1999, rebels killed 11 civilians and looted property during an attack in the district. In a separate attack in the same month, the member of parliament for Buyangabo county was shot and wounded in an attack in neighboring Kabarole District by ADF insurgents.

== Population ==
The 1991 national population census estimated the district population at 92,300. During the 2002 national census, the population of was put at about 158,900. The annual population growth rate in the district was estimated at 5.2 percent.

In 2012, the population of the district was estimated at 261,700.

== Economic activities ==
Subsistence agriculture and animal husbandry are the two major economic activities in the district. It is the largest producer of cocoa in Uganda, accounting for unprocessed beans worth UGX:90 billion annually.

=== Crops grown ===
- Coffee
- Cocoa
- Maize
- Beans
- Rice

=== Livestock kept ===
- Cattle
- Pigs
- Sheep
- Goats
- Poultry (chicken and ducks)

== See also ==
- Semuliki National Park
- Bundibugyo ebolavirus
- Districts of Uganda
