= Bundibugyo =

Town in Uganda

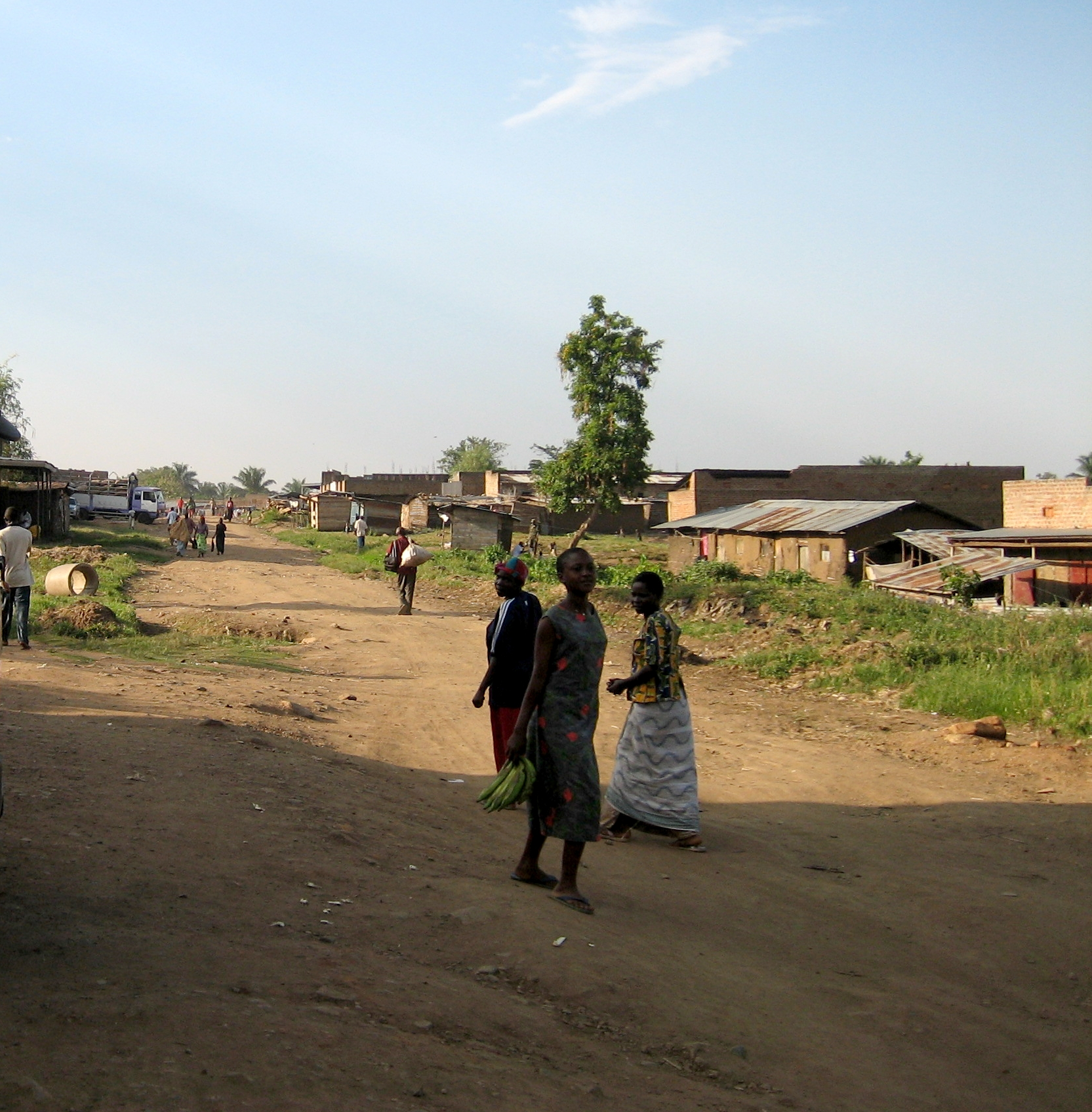

- Location in Uganda
- Coordinates: 00°42′45″N 30°03′36″E
- Country: Uganda
- Region: Western Uganda
- Sub-region: Rwenzururu sub-region
- District: Bundibugyo District
- Elevation: 3,461 ft (1,055 m)

Population (2020 Estimate)
  - Total: 22,300
- Climate: Am

Bundibugyo is a town in the Western Region of Uganda. It is the chief town of Bundibugyo District and the district headquarters are located there.

== Location ==
Bundibugyo is located approximately 85 kilometres (53 mi), by road, west of Fort Portal, the nearest large city. The direct distance is much shorter, due to the steep terrain and winding nature of the roads in the neighborhood. The town of Bundibugyo is located approximately 378 kilometres (235 mi), by road, west of Kampala, the largest city and national capital of Uganda.

The geographical coordinates of Bundibugyo town are:0°42'45.0"N 30°03'36.0"E (Latitude:0.712500; Longitude: 30.059999). Bundibugyo Town Council sits at an average elevation of 3,461 feet (1,055 m) above mean sea level, lying between 2,477 feet (755 m) and 7,733 feet (2,357 m) above sea level.

== Overview ==
Bundibugyo is one of the most western of all Uganda's district capitals. Although Kisoro, Kanungu, and Rukungiri are located further west than Bundibugyo, it is the only Ugandan district capital located west of the Rwenzori Mountains. It sits at an altitude of approximately 900 metres (3,000 ft), above sea level. The predominant ethnicities in the town are the Bamba and the Bakonjo. However other ethnicities coexist with them including the Batooro, Bakiga, Banyoro and the Banyankole.

== Population ==
The 2002 national census enumerated the population of Bundibugyo at 13,782. In 2010, the Uganda Bureau of Statistics (UBOS) estimated the population of the town at 20,500. In 2011, UBOS estimated the mid-year population of Bundibugyo at 21,600.

In 2014, the national population census put the town's population at 18,823. In 2015, UBOS estimated the town's population at 19,000. In 2020, the population agency estimated the mid-year population of Bundibugyo Town Council at 22,300. Of those, 11,400 (51.1 percent) were females, and 10,900 (48.9 percent) were males. UBOS calculated that the population of the town increased at an average rate of 3.3 percent annually between 2015 and 2020.

Historical population
Year	Pop.	±%
2002	13,782	—
2010	20,500	+48.7%
2011	21,600	+5.4%
2014	18,823	−12.9%
2015	19,000	+0.9%
2020	22,300	+17.4%

== Points of interest ==
The following points of interest lie within the town or close to its borders:

1. The headquarters of Bundibugyo District Administration
2. The offices of Bundibugyo Town Council
3. Bundibugyo Central Market, the largest source of fresh produce in the town
4. Bundibugyo General Hospital, a 160-bed public hospital administered by the Uganda Ministry of Health
5. A branch of Stanbic Bank
6. Bundibugyo Airport, a civilian airport
7. Ebenezer Seventh-day Adventist Church, a place of worship affiliated with the Seventh Day Adventist faith.

== See also ==
- Bundibugyo District
- Rwenzori Mountains
- Uganda Hospitals
- Rwenzururu
- Western Uganda
- Ugandan Towns
