= Forestry in Uganda =

Today, forest and woodland cover in Uganda stands at 1 km^{2} or 24% of the total land area. Of these 1 km^{2} is tropical rainforest, 1 km^{2} are forest plantations and 1 km^{2} is woodland. 30% of these areas are protected as national parks, wildlife reserves or central forest reserves.

== History ==
In the late 1980s, 75,000 square kilometres of land in Uganda consisted of forest and woodland. About 15,000 square kilometres, or 7 percent of Uganda's dry land area, was protected forest reserves. Roughly 250 square kilometres of protected reserves were tree farms. The most important forest products are timber, firewood, charcoal, wood pulp, and paper.

Other important products included leaves for fodder and fertilizer, medicinal herbs, fruits, and fibers, and a variety of grasses used in weaving and household applications. Production of most materials increased as much as 100 percent between 1980 and 1988. The output of timber for construction declined from 1980 to 1985, before increasing slightly to 433 million units in 1987 and continuing to increase in 1988. Paper production also increased substantially in 1988.

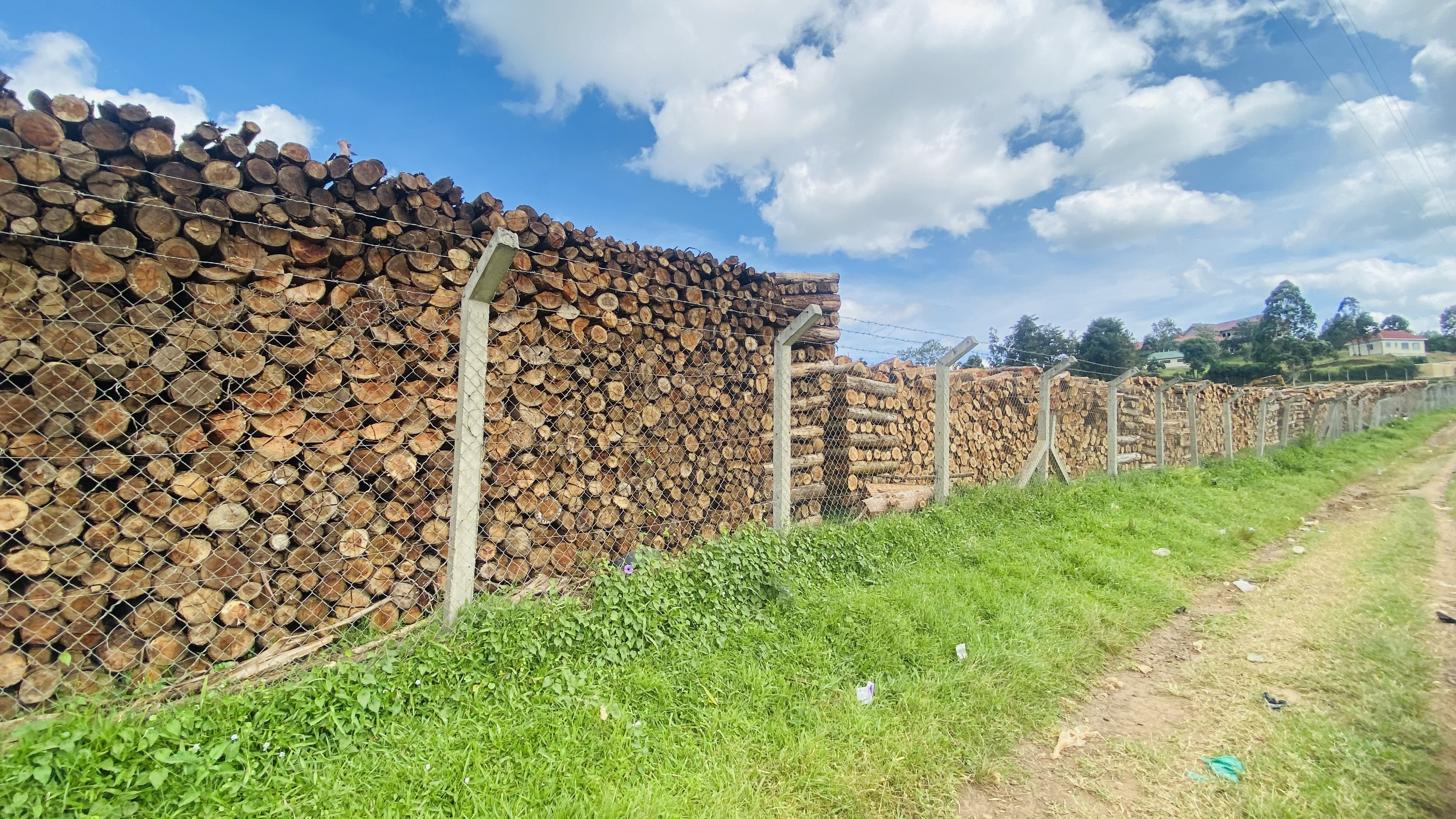
Piles of chopped dry ecalyptus wood in near Igara Secondary school near Butare town in Bushenyi district in Western Uganda

Nationwide forest resources were being planted rapidly. Deforestation was especially severe in poverty-stricken areas, where many people placed short-term survival needs ahead of the long-term goal of maintaining the nation's economical sector. Agricultural encroachment, logging, charcoal making, and harvesting for firewood consumed more wooded area each year. An additional toll on forest reserves resulted from wildfires, often the result of illegal moonshine-making activity in reserves. Neither natural regrowth nor tree-planting projects could keep pace with the demand for forest products.

In 1988 the Ministry of Environmental Protection was responsible for implementing forest policy and management. Ministry officials warned that the loss of productive woodlands would eventually lead to land erosion, environmental degradation, energy shortages, food shortages, and rural poverty in general, and they hoped to change traditional attitudes toward forests and other natural resources.

In 1989 the government implemented a six-year forestry rehabilitation project financed by the United Nations Development Program (UNDP) and the Food and Agriculture Organization of the United Nations (FAO). This project included a nationwide tree-planting campaign and a series of three-year training courses for rural extension agents, leaders of women's groups, educators, and farmers. Britain, the Federal Republic of Germany (West Germany), and several multilateral donor agencies also provided assistance in the forestry sector.

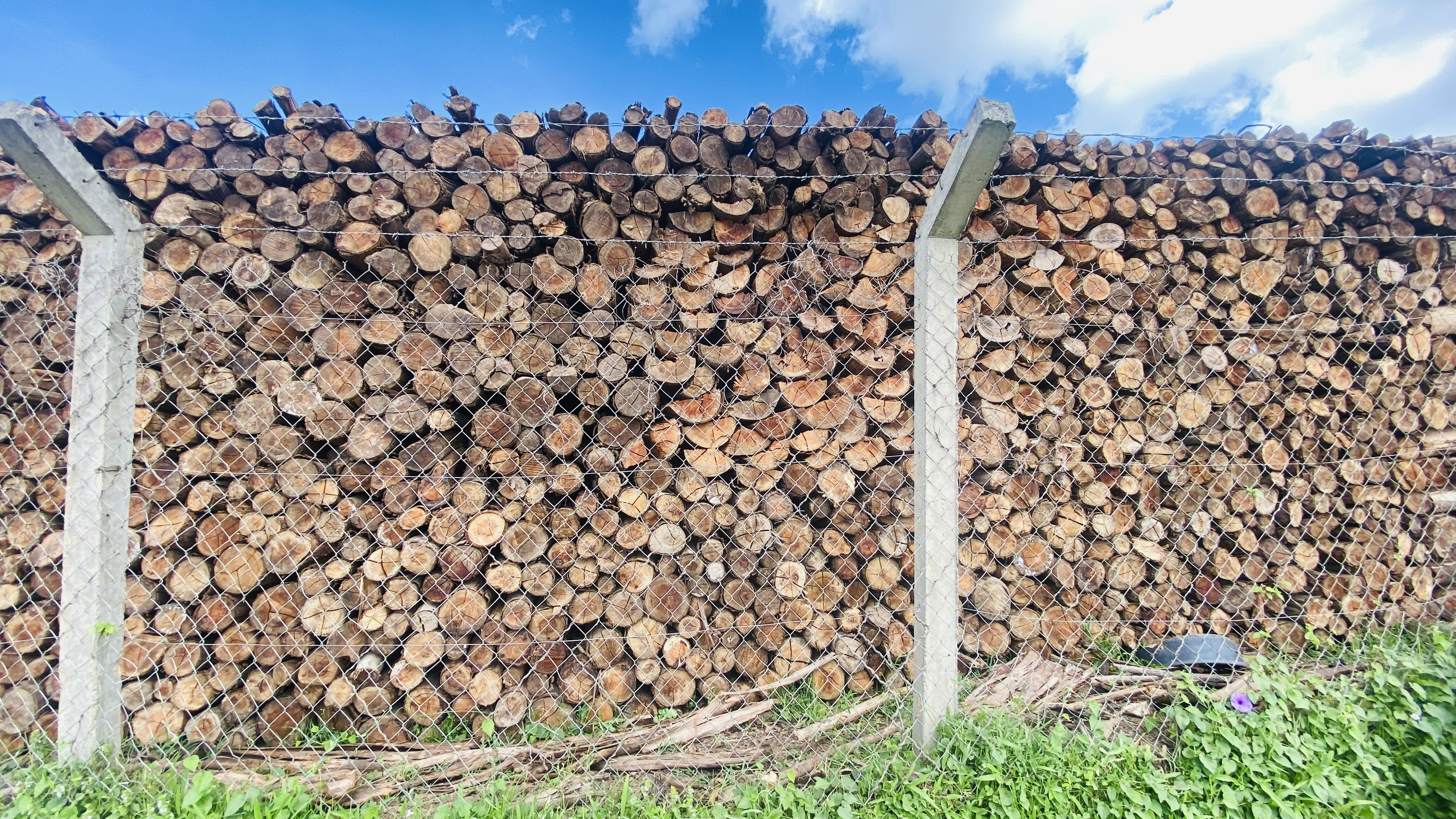
Piles of chopped dry ecalyptus wood in near Butare town in Bushenyi district in Western Uganda

Economic crises often hampered efforts to conserve natural resources. Many people lacked the motivation to plan for future generations when their own survival was at risk. As a result, illegal activities, including logging, charcoal making, and firewood gathering in posted reserves contributed to rapid deforestation. Government forestry agents, who were generally underpaid, sometimes sold firewood for their own profit or permitted illegal activities in return for bribes. In these ways, entrenched poverty and corruption drained public resources from use by present and future generations. In 1989 officials threatened to prosecute trespassers in posted forest areas, but by the end of the year, it had not implemented this policy.

=== 2000s ===
To revive forestry the government abolished the Forest Department and established the National Forestry Authority (Uganda)(NFA) in 2004. The aim of this action was to increase revenue and quality of the forest management. In the financial year of 2004/2005, the first year after the took over from the Forest Department, the NFA increased the revenue from forest products to USh 5,400,000,000/= or US$2,160,000 from previous year's 1,200,000,000/= or US$480,000 due open puplic tendering of 80.000m³ of timber. Total area of planted trees by the NFA stand at 12 km^{2} in the same year.

The areas under Management of the NFA are gazetted to 506 Central Forest Reserves.

== Tree cover extent and loss ==
Global Forest Watch publishes annual estimates of tree cover loss and 2000 tree cover extent derived from time-series analysis of Landsat satellite imagery in the Global Forest Change dataset. In this framework, tree cover refers to vegetation taller than 5 m (including natural forests and tree plantations), and tree cover loss is defined as the complete removal of tree cover canopy for a given year, regardless of cause.

For Uganda, country statistics report cumulative tree cover loss of 1,164,707 ha (11,647.07 km^{2}) from 2001 to 2024 (about 15.0% of its 2000 tree cover area). For tree cover density greater than 30%, country statistics report a 2000 tree cover extent of 7,764,953 ha (77,649.53 km^{2}). The charts and table below display this data. In simple terms, the annual loss number is the area where tree cover disappeared in that year, and the extent number shows what remains of the 2000 tree cover baseline after subtracting cumulative loss. Forest regrowth is not included in the dataset.

Annual tree cover loss in Uganda, 2001–2024. View chart definition.
Tree cover extent in 2000 minus cumulative tree cover loss in Uganda, 2001–2024 (loss-only residual; does not account for gain). View chart definition.

Annual tree cover extent and loss
Year	Tree cover extent (km2) (Note: This residual measure does not include forest regrowth.)	Annual tree cover loss (km2)
2001	77,352.95	296.58
2002	77,244.54	108.41
2003	77,124.74	119.80
2004	76,943.98	180.76
2005	76,652.26	291.72
2006	76,367.76	284.50
2007	76,001.50	366.26
2008	75,632.24	369.26
2009	75,399.30	232.94
2010	75,057.81	341.49
2011	74,407.14	650.67
2012	74,115.72	291.42
2013	73,638.23	477.49
2014	73,089.11	549.12
2015	72,548.89	540.22
2016	71,874.03	674.86
2017	70,705.00	1,169.03
2018	69,842.70	862.30
2019	69,210.03	632.67
2020	68,474.01	736.02
2021	67,981.55	492.46
2022	67,340.20	641.35
2023	66,651.05	689.15
2024	66,002.46	648.59

== REDD+ reference level and monitoring ==
Under the UNFCCC REDD+ framework, Uganda has submitted a national forest reference emission level (FREL) package. On the UNFCCC REDD+ Web Platform, the country's 2017 submission package is listed as having an assessed reference level, together with a reported national strategy, safeguards information and a reported national forest monitoring system.

The first assessed FREL, submitted in 2017 and technically assessed in 2018, covered the REDD+ activity "reducing emissions from deforestation" at national scale. Using a 2000-2015 historical reference period, the modified and assessed FREL was 8,254,691 t CO2 eq per year, revised from 8,047,420 t CO2 eq per year in the original submission. The technical assessment states that the benchmark represented the annual average of CO2 emissions from deforestation, defined as the conversion of forest to non-forest, and included above-ground biomass and below-ground biomass only. It used a forest definition of land with a minimum area of 1 hectare, minimum crown cover of 30 percent, and trees at least 4 metres tall or capable of reaching that height.

== See also ==
=== Protected areas ===
- List of central forests reserves of Uganda
- List of local forests reserves of Uganda
- List of wildlife reserves of Uganda

=== Other ===
- Uganda Forestry Working Group
