= Bugungu Airstrip =

Airstrip in Uganda

- IATA: none; ICAO: HUGG

Summary
- Airport type: Public
- Serves: Murchison Falls National Park
- Elevation AMSL: 2,470 ft / 753 m
- Coordinates: 2°12′10″N 31°33′16″E

Map
- Location of the airport in Uganda

Runways
Direction	Length		Surface
Direction	ft	m	Surface
05/23	5,055	1,540	Gravel

Bugungu Airstrip is an airport serving the Bugungu Wildlife Reserve in the Murchison Falls National Park (MFNP), in the Western Region of Uganda.

== Location ==
The airstrip is located within Bugungu Wildlife Reserve, in Buliisa District of the Western Region, within the confines of the Murchison Falls National Park.

Bugungu Airstrip is located approximately 260 kilometres (162 mi) north-west of Entebbe International Airport, Uganda's largest civilian and military airport. By air, the journey takes approximately one hour fifteen minutes, while by road it covers 333 kilometres (207 mi) and takes approximately five to six hours.

The geographical coordinates of Bugungu Airstrip are: 02°12'10.0"N, 31°33'16.0"E (Latitude:2.202778; Longitude:31.554444). Bugungu Airstrip is located at an average elevation of 753 metres (2,470 ft), above sea level.

== Overview ==
Bugungu Airstrip receives daily domestic flights from Entebbe International Airport and Kajjansi Airfield, which are primarily used by tourists to visit Murchison Falls National Park, Bugungu Wildlife Reserve, Karuma Wildlife Reserve, Budongo Wildlife Reserve as well as connecting to Kidepo Valley National Park and Queen Elizabeth National Park.

The airstrip is managed by the Uganda Wildlife Authority, under license by the Uganda Civil Aviation Authority.

== Accommodation facilities around the airstrip ==
- Murchison River Lodge
- Baker's Lodge
- Paraa Safari Lodge

== Airlines and destinations ==
Airlines	Destinations
Aerolink Uganda	Entebbe

== See also ==
- Transport in Uganda
- List of airports in Uganda
