= Budongo Conservation Field Station =

Conservation project in Uganda

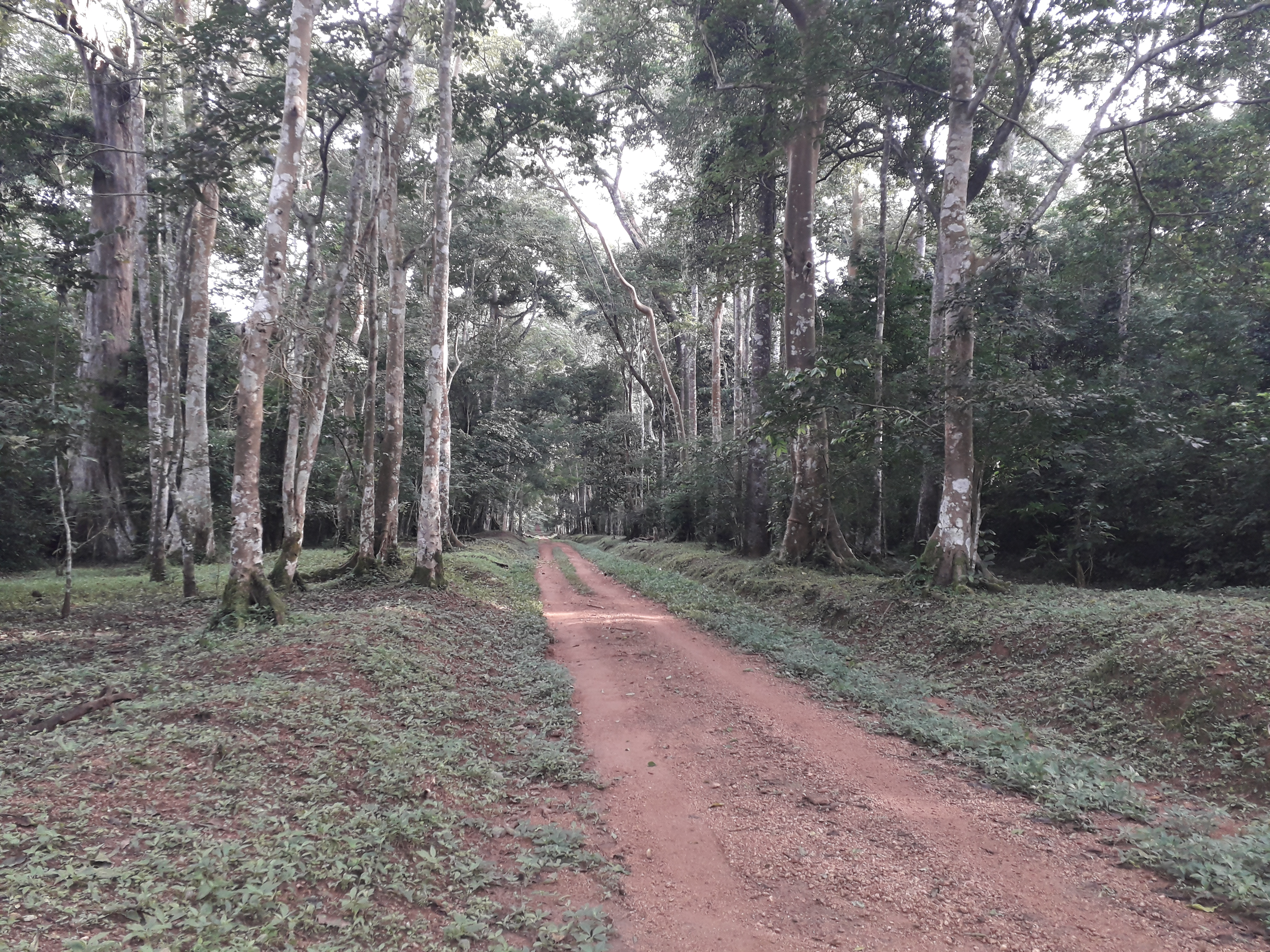
- The Royal Mile, Budongo Forest

- Location within Uganda
- Location: Uganda
- Nearest city: Masindi
- Coordinates: 01°43′27″N 31°32′45″E
- Area: 1,978 km^{2} (764 sq mi)
- Established: 1990

The Budongo Conservation Field Station (BCFS) is a Ugandan NGO based in the Budongo forest in Western Uganda within the Albertine Rift ecoregion. The station is focussed on research, wildlife conservation and community engagement.

BCFS carries out research with several international partners including the Royal Zoological Society of Scotland. The BCFS work has been instrumental in the conservation of the forest and in influencing primate research and conservation in Uganda.

== Location ==
BCFS is located in the centre of Budongo Forest at the end of the ‘Royal Mile’, a road thought to be named for a former Bunyoro king who used the road to flee arrest by the British. The site is protected by the National Forestry Authority and is known for its diversity of birds and large population of chimpanzees.

== History ==
The station was established in 1990 by anthropologist Professor Vernon Reynolds, initially as the Budongo Forest Project, with aims to establish the status of the forest’s chimpanzees. The project took over an old sawmill site which was abandoned under Idi Amin's rule. The houses originally built for sawmill workers were renovated to create a base for staff and students. Over the course of the next five years, the chimpanzees were habituated and have been observed continuously ever since, making the project station one of the longest-running chimpanzee research sites in Africa. In 2007, the project achieved the status of Ugandan NGO and was renamed the Budongo Conservation Field Station.

== Work ==
BCFS carry out monitoring and research on Budongo forest’s climate, plants, birds, amphibians and primates. The staff consist of several teams. Field staff monitor chimpanzees and study birds, amphibians, soil nutrient cycling and trees. A snare patrol team remove wire snares set in the forest. The veterinary team treat animals caught in snares and provide veterinary care to local livestock. BCFS has a reputation for research excellence, regularly hosting national and international researchers primarily to study the forest’s primates. The staff also publish their own research and observations in online primatology journal The Perspectives Collective, a platform for local and indigenous field staff to share their knowledge.

== Community outreach ==
Community outreach is a large part of the station’s work, with conservation education sessions frequently delivered in local schools and students regularly hosted on-site. BCFS also aim to improve the livelihoods of local people and reduce illegal resource use in Budongo forest. These include engaging with hunters to provide livelihood opportunities such as goat rearing, teaching local farmers to grow crops which are less likely to be raided by wildlife and providing communities with the resources to establish their own woodlots for firewood.
