= Arua Central Forest Reserve =

Arua Central Forest Reserve, also known as Barifa Forest is a protected area in Arua district, Uganda . It is managed by National Forestry Authority (NFA). The reserve is constantly under threat from depletion and encroachers who are a threat the existence of tree species in this forest reserve. The forest was gazetted in 1932 with a land coverage of 236 hectares.

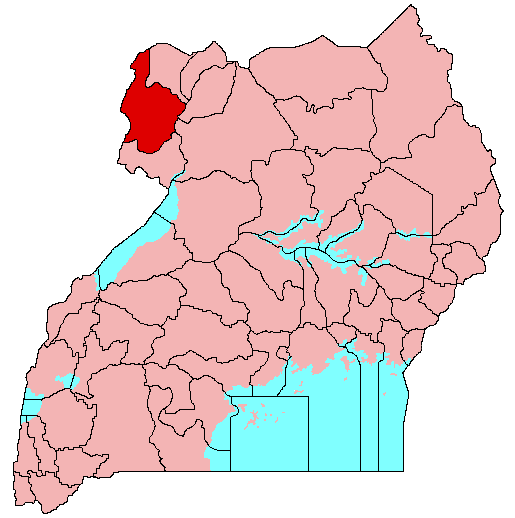
Arua district, marked with red.

== Location ==
Arua Central Forest Reserve is located at Latitude 3.0102° N, and Longitude 30.9274° E.

== Controversies ==
Arua Central Forest Reserve has in the past been affected by multiple encroachments. It was at one point believed that, the forest reserve was given away to investors for timber production. NFA intervened to clarify the forest is under their control as the management authority.

== See also ==
- Budongo Forest
- Mabira Forest
