= Kabalega Secondary School =

Secondary school in Uganda

Location
- Masindi, Masindi District; Uganda; 01°41′44″N 31°42′56″E

Information
- Type: Public middle school and high school (13-19)
- Motto: "I Learn To Serve"
- Established: January 1, 1959; 67 years ago
- Headteacher: Jackson Katusiime (2026)
- Faculty: 20 + (2026)
- Enrollment: 650+ (2022)
- Colours: Red and Yellow
- Athletics: Rugby, football, track, tennis, volleyball, basketball
- Website: Homepage

Kabalega Secondary School College is a boys-only boarding secondary school located in Masindi City in the Western Region of Uganda. The school offers both Ordinary Level (O-Level) and Advance Level (A-Level) subjects and examinations. The school is named after King (Omukama) Kabalega Chwa II of Bunyoro who lived from 18 June 1853 until 6 April 1923.

== Location ==
The school campus is situated along Bobi Road in the city of Masindi, approximately 1.5 kilometres (0.93 mi), by road, north of the Masindi Municipal Council Office. The coordinates of Kabalega Secondary School are:01°41'44.0"N, 31°42'56.0"E (Latitude:1.695556; Longitude:31.71555632).

== History ==
The school was founded in 1959. Over the years, the enrollment rose to over 1,000 students. During the 1990s Kabalega Secondary School fell on hard times and both teachers and learners were discouraged. Enrollment declined to less than 500 students. A new headmaster was posted to the school in February 2018. Working with the old boys' association called "KASSOBA", that headmaster, Andrew Tumwesige made gradual improvements in teaching and learning conditions.

== Houses of residence ==
The houses of residence at the school include:

1. Bikunya House

== Sports ==
The school is competitive in several sports including soccer where it is a leader both regionally and nationally.

== Prominent alunmni ==
- Felix Kulayigye, a Major General who serves as the Director of Defence Public Information in the Uganda People's Defence Force (UPDF). He studied at this school for his O-Level classes.
- Rukirabasaija Agutamba Solomon Gafabusa Iguru I, the King (Omukama) of Bunyoro since 1994. He attended the school in the 1960s.

== See also ==
- Education in Uganda.
