= Bugungu Wildlife Reserve =

Forest in Uganda

- IUCN category III (natural monument or feature)
- Location within Uganda
- Location: Buliisa District and Masindi District, Western Uganda
- Nearest city: Masindi, Masindi District
- Coordinates: 1°58′33.636″N 31°31′8.4″E
- Area: 473 km^{2} (183 sq mi)
- Elevation: 600–1,300 m (2,000–4,300 ft)
- Established: 1963
- Governing body: Uganda Wildlife Authority

Bugungu Wildlife Reserve is a protected area in both Buliisa District and Masindi District in Western Uganda. It covers an area of 473.0 km^{2} (182.6 sq mi). It is managed by Uganda Wildlife Authority under the supervision of Ministry of Tourism, Wildlife and Antiquities. It was declared a Wildlife Reserve in 1968 but it was originally established as a Controlled Hunting Area in 1963. Its WDPA ID is 1438. It is IUCN Management Category III.

== Geography ==
It is located in western Uganda near to a village called Bugungu Fr (Bugoigo) at coordinates 1.8694°N 31.4532°E. It borders with Murchison falls National Park in the east side, Karuma Wildlife Reserve in the North-East, Budongo Forest Reserve in the North West, Kyabatwa hill in the west.

Its altitude is 600–1,300 m (2,000–4,300 ft).

== Wildlife ==
Bugungu has many wildlife forms which include animals such as Uganda Kobs, Buffalos, leopards, reed-buck; plants such as Savannah woodland and over 240 bird species which include Shoebill stork, the White-browed Sparrow Weaver, the Black-billed barbets, the Eastern grey Plantain-eater, the Speckle-breasted woodpecker, the Yellow-throated greenbul, the Black-billed wood dove, the Double-toothed barbet, and the Giant Kingfisher.

== Tourism ==
The reserve has roads that enable tourists to go for nature walks, camping, bird watching, game drives among other activities.

== See also ==
- Kyambura Game Reserve
- List of Wildlife Reserves of Uganda
- List of Local Forest Reserves of Uganda
- Uganda Wildlife Authority
- Bugungu Airstrip
