= East Madi Wildlife Reserve =

Forest in Uganda

Coordinates: 3.05°N 31.60°E

East Madi Wildlife Reserve is a protected area located in Adjumani District in Uganda, in the Madi sub-region. It covers an area of 831 km^{2} (321 sq mi). It is managed by Uganda Wildlife Authority under the supervision of Ministry of Tourism, Wildlife and Antiquities. It was established as a reserve in 2002.

== Wildlife ==
East Madi Wildlife Reserve has a variety of flora and fauna which includes over 50 mammals, including hyenas, leopards, lions; more than 181 bird species including the shoebill stork; and 374 plant species.

== Tourism ==
This reserve is used for nature walks, game drives and bird watching.

== Conservation status ==
There was a land conflict between the Uganda Wildlife Authority, the Amuru District Local Government and Adjumani District Local Government for land located within the East Madi Wildlife reserve that had started in 2005 when internally displaced persons from different camps occupied the East Madi Wildlife Reserve, which the wildlife authority called illegal. But the leaders in Amuru District local government claimed that the gazetted land for the reserve was located in their district. In 2012, over 6000 locals were evicted from East Madi Forest reserve by wildlife authority personnel. This issue was resolved in 2015 after a land survey and establishment of the boundaries for the reserve between districts of Adjumani and Amuru was done by Government through the Ministry of Lands, Housing & Urban Development. On 23 October 2017, the Uganda Wildlife Authority and Adjumani District Local Government were given full control of the reserve by the Ministry of Local Government.

In 2023, the constitutional court ruled that the East Madi Wildlife Reserve belonged to the Apaa community after a petition for creating this reserve in Adjumani District.

== See also ==
- Karuma Wildlife Reserve
- List of Wildlife Reserves of Uganda
- List of Local Forest Reserves of Uganda
- Uganda Wildlife Authority
