= List of Wildlife Reserves of Uganda =

In Uganda, Wildlife Reserve managed by Uganda Wildlife Authority under the supervision of Ministry of Tourism, Wildlife and Antiquities. UWA also manages National Parks, Community Wildlife Management Areas and Wildlife Sanctuaries.

There are 12 Wildlife reserves in Uganda.

List of Wildlife Reserves in Uganda:
Rank	Name	Geodata	Size (Hactres)	District	Notes
1	Bugungu		52,000	Masindi	
2	Kyambura		15522.39	Bushenyi	
2	Karuma		82573.29	Masindi	
3	Kigezi		18370.91	Rukungiri	
4	Semliki (aka Toro Semlikii)		38835.26	Bundibugyo	
5	Katonga			Kamwenge	
6	Pian Upe			Karamoja	
7	Bokora Corridor		2056	Karamoja	
8	Ajai		16600	Arua	
9	Kabwoya		8700	Kibale	
10	Karuma		82,000	Masindi	
11	East Madi		83100	Amuru	
12	Matheniko			Karamoja	

== See also ==
- Albertine Rift montane forests
- List of Central Forest Reserves of Uganda
- List of Local Forest Reserves of Uganda
