= Masindi Hotel =

Hotel in western Uganda

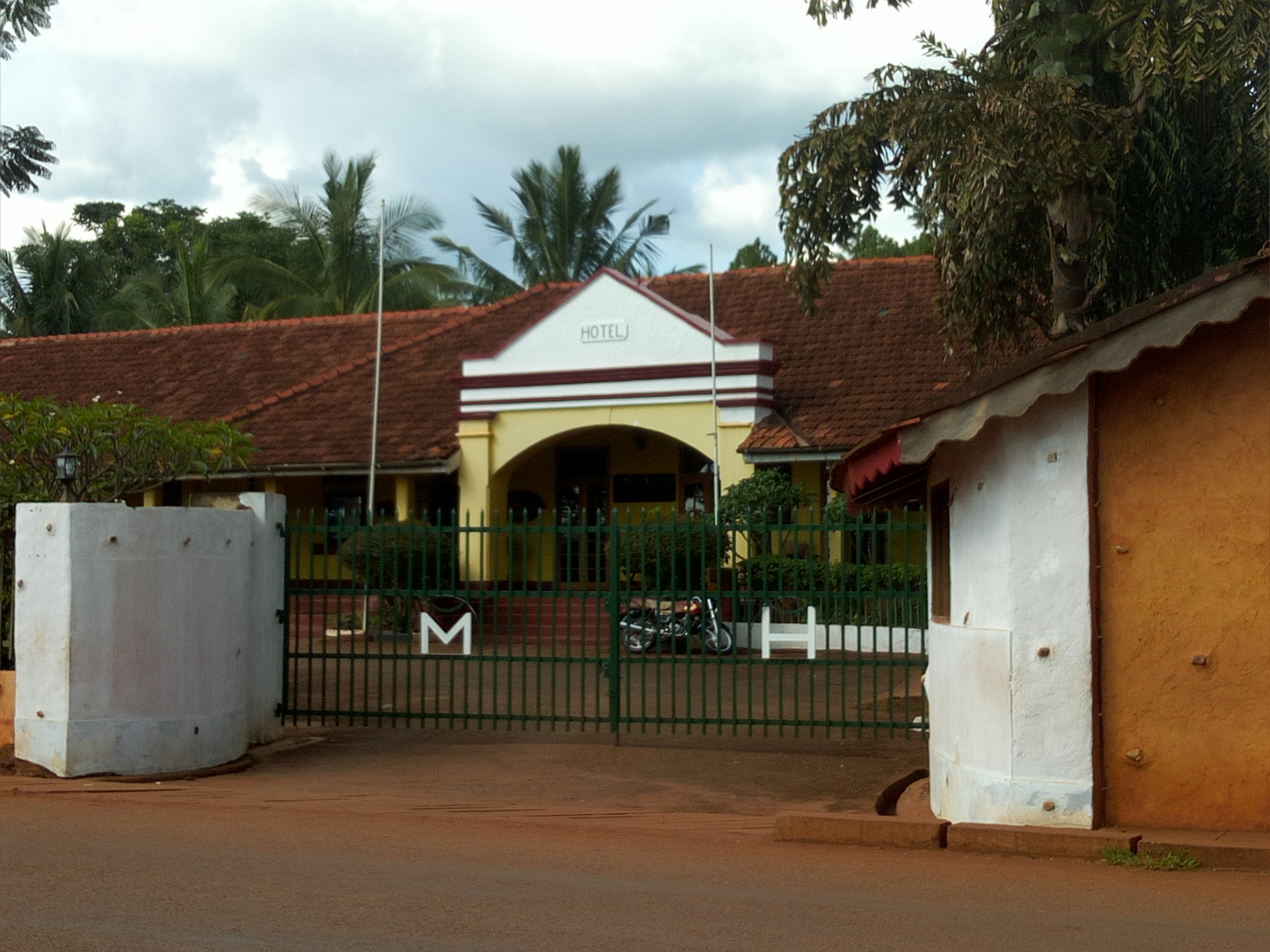
- Entrance to Masindi Hotel
- Interactive map of the Masindi Hotel area

General information
- Location: 22-34 Butiaba Road, Masindi, Uganda
- Coordinates: 01°41′26″N 31°42′43″E
- Opening: 1923

Technical details
- Floor count: 1

Website
- Masindi Hotel Homepage

Masindi Hotel is a hotel in Masindi, the district headquarters of Masindi District, in western Uganda.

== Location ==
The hotel is located in the town of Masindi, approximately 214 kilometres (133 mi) northwest of Kampala, Uganda's capital and largest city, on an all-weather tarmac highway.

== Overview ==
Masindi Hotel was built in 1923 by the now defunct East Africa Railways and Harbours Company. It is Uganda’s oldest hotel. Masindi was a transit point for many goods and produce from the Northern Congo and Southern Sudan destined for export to European markets in the early 20th century. Cargo was shipped across Lake Albert, trucked from Butiaba up to Masindi Customs Sheds. From Masindi, goods were trucked on to Masindi Port on to Lake Kyoga where it was shipped down to Soroti and then by railway to Mombasa. Ernest Hemingway was involved in two plane crashes at Murchison Falls and Butiaba airstrip, within the space of one week. Ernest Hemingway recovered at Masindi Hotel for 3 months. Humphrey Bogart and Katharine Hepburn stayed at Masindi Hotel whilst filming The African Queen at Masindi Port.

After independence Masindi Hotel was taken over by the Government, and it was a part of the Uganda Hotels chain for nearly 30 years. In 2000, Masindi Hotel was privatized and has undergone major renovations. The hotel has a restaurant, a bar and both land-line and wireless internet connections.

== Photos ==
- Photos of Masindi Hotel
