= Kebisoni Local Forest Reserve =

Protected area in Rukungiri District, Uganda

Kebisoni Local Forest Reserve is a protected forest that is located with in Rubabo Subcounty in Rukungiri District in western Uganda. It It is managed by National Forestry Authority. Its WPDA ID is 40367. It was declared a forest reserve in 1998. It covers an area of 0.06 km^{2}.

== Biodiversity ==
Most of its area is planted with ecalyptus trees.

== Conservation status and threats ==
Kebisoni Local Forest Reserve has 7 km^{2} of planted Eucalyptus trees planted.

Lumbering, charcoal burners, deforestation for wood fuel and building poles, cash crop farming, poaching, encroachment.

== See also ==
1. National Forestry Authority
2. List of Central Forest Reserves of Uganda
3. Lakes of Uganda
4. Katenta Local Forest Reserve
