= Budongo Forest =

Forest in Uganda

- Budongo Central Forest Reserve
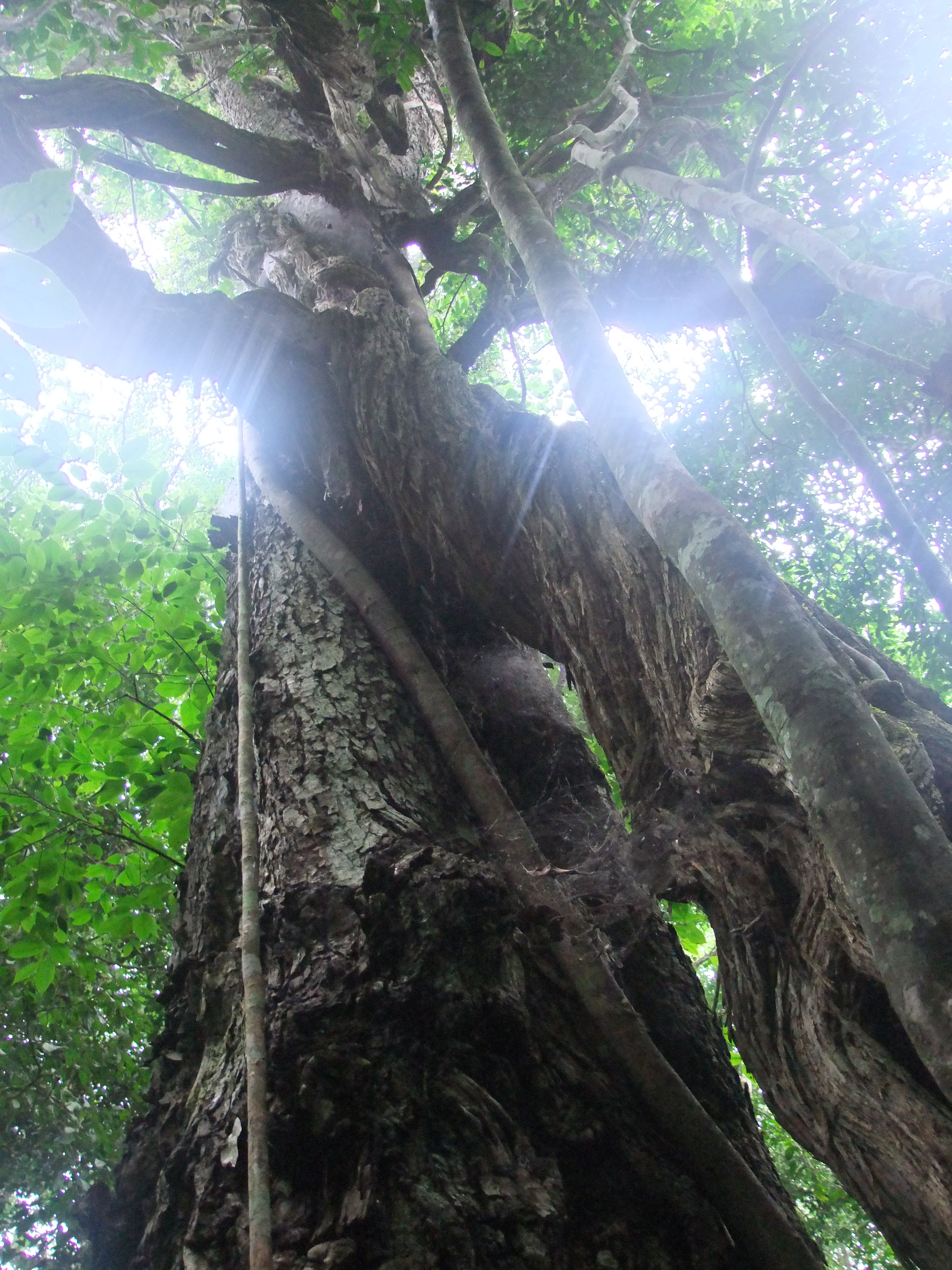

- Location within Uganda
- Location: Western Region, Uganda
- Nearest city: Masindi
- Coordinates: 01°43′27″N 31°32′45″E
- Area: 825 km^{2} (319 sq mi)
- Governing body: National Forestry Authority

The Budongo Forest in Uganda is northwest of the capital city Kampala on the way to Murchison Falls National Park and is located on the escarpment northeast of Lake Albert. It covers parts of Hoima and Kikuube. It is known for its former abundance of East African mahogany trees as well as being home to a population of chimpanzees. An exceptionally large mahogany tree is still found here and is more than 80 metres (260 ft) tall and some 20 metres (66 ft) in circumference. The forest covers 82,530 hectares and is a catchment for Lake Albert. It is managed by National Forestry Authority (NFA).

== Setting and conservation ==
The area, situated between 1° 37 N - 2° 03 N and 31° 22 - 31° 46 E, is 435 km^{2} in extent and is composed mainly of moist, medium-altitude, semi-deciduous forest, with patches of savanna and woodland. It covers a gently rolling landscape, sloping down to the East African Rift. Four streams, Waisoke, Sonso, Kamirambwa and Siba, drain the forest and flow into Lake Albert. Annual rainfall in the area is between 1200 and 2200 mm, the rainy season being from March - May and again from September - November, the dry season being December - February.

It is made up of six forest blocks that is Siba, Waibira, Busaju, Kaniyo-Pabidi, Biiso and Nyakafunjo.

The nearest town is Masindi, and much of the land around the forest is given over to crops, dwellings and villages, placing continuous pressure on the forest margins, and leading to exploitation for building materials and bushmeat, the snares set by poachers causing mutilation of the chimpanzees and other animals. The mahogany trees that still remain are cut and removed by itinerant pit sawyers.

Some of the human activities carried out include; charcoal burning, illegal logging, poaching, mining and unsustainable agriculture such as rice farming. Some parts of the forest has been cleared to plant sugarcanes and tobacco.

It is managed by National Forestry Authority (NFA) and it has supplied tree seedlings to environmentalists to plant them.

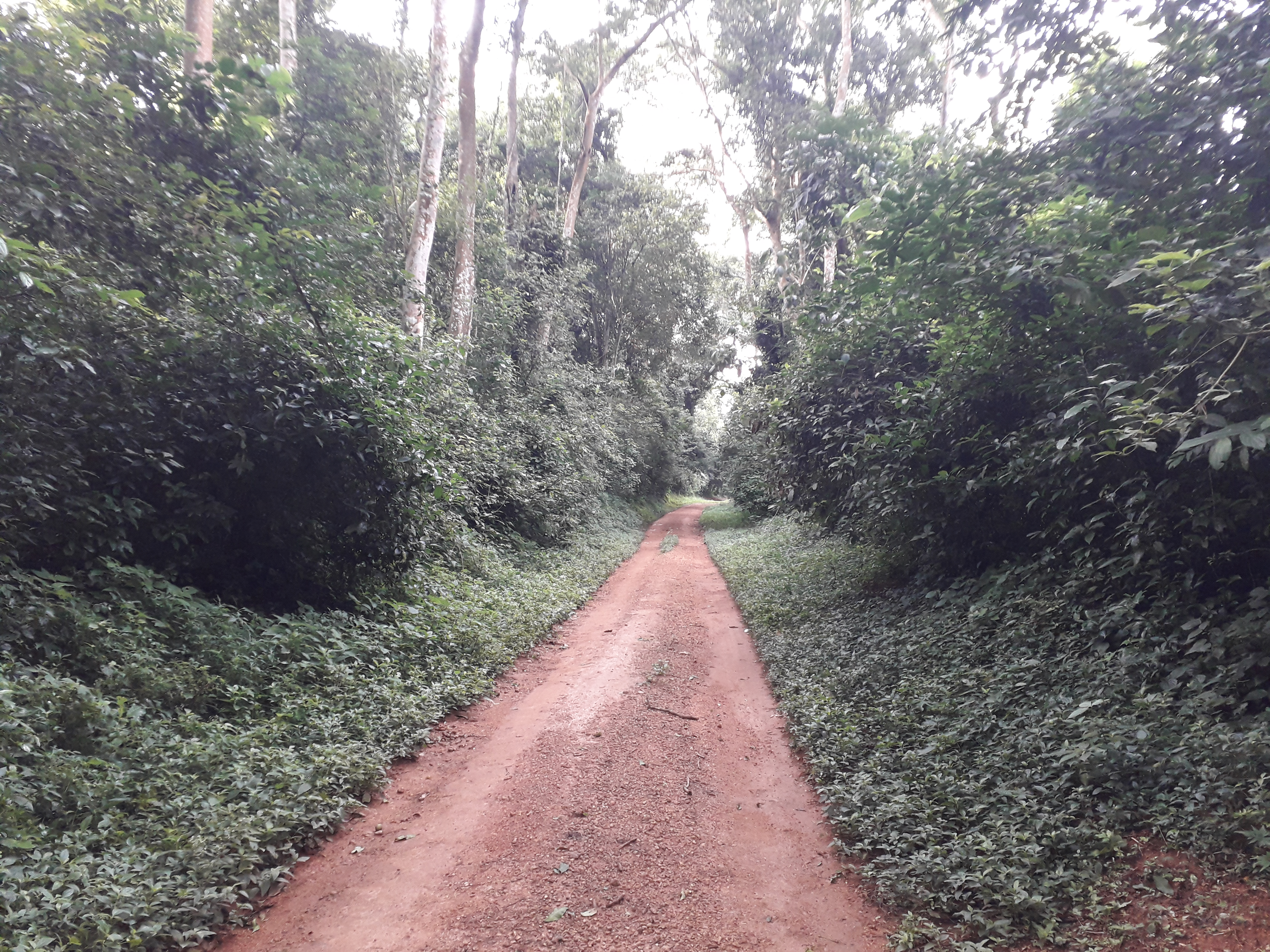

In 2021, the UNCHR partnered with NFA to reforest and 50 hectares of Budongo forest reserve were restored.

== Wildlife ==
Recorded from Budongo are more than 360 bird species (such as Nahan's Partridge Ptilopachus nahani), plant species such as Senna spectabilis (white barked senna) tree, 20 species of amphibians some 292 butterflies, 130 moths, 465 trees, and 24 mammals (of which nine are primates and others include buffaloes, bush elephants, Uganda kobs, jackals). About 600 chimpanzees are estimated to stay in the forest. Classified as a moist semi-deciduous medium-altitude forest, Budongo supports various species of tree, the most impressive being, large buttressed giant mahoganies that have been left unfelled and now stand up to 60 metres (200 ft) tall. The bird checklist includes 60 west or central African bird species known from fewer than five locations in East Africa. Yellow-footed flycatcher, often associated with ironwood trees, has not been recorded elsewhere in Uganda, while Ituri batis, lemon-bellied crombec, white-thighed hornbill, black-eared ground thrush and chestnut-capped flycatcher are known from only one other East African forest. Chimpanzee tracking has become an activity popular with eco-tourists, necessitating behavioural guidelines for visitors in order to avoid undue disturbance of both animals and forest. Trails have been cut criss-crossing the forest, initially to ease access for research workers and since then used by Eco-tourists, forest animals and poachers.

== Wildlife research ==
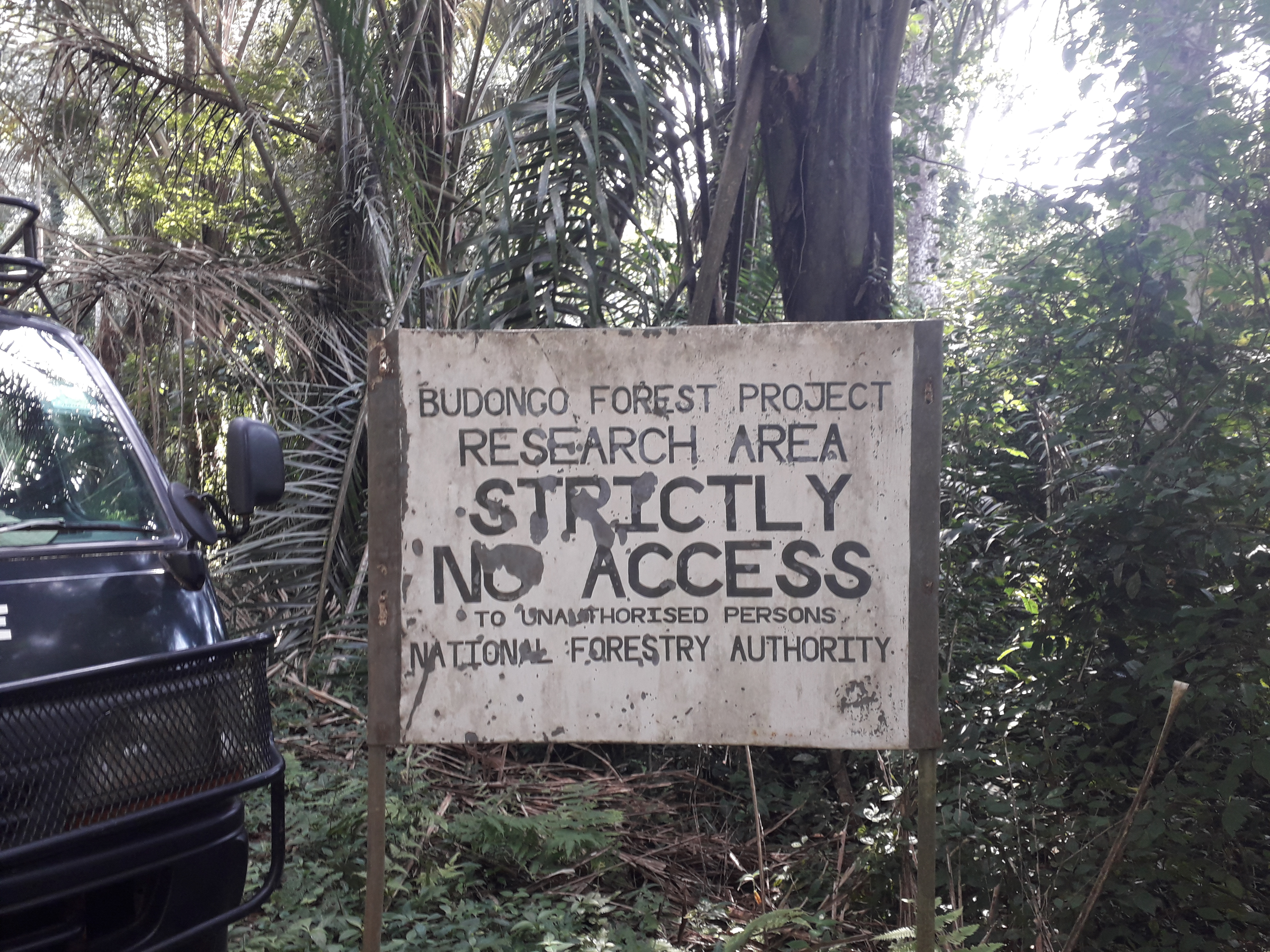
The Royal Mile - Budongo Forest

Vernon Reynolds first studied chimpanzees in this forest in 1962 and he eventually founded the Budongo Conservation Field Station. He wrote a book about the forest and its chimpanzees in 1965. Reynolds was one of a trio of pioneer field researchers - the others being Jane Goodall and Adriaan Kortlandt. During the 1970s and 1980s civil war raged in the country, with an accompanying breakdown of law and order. Chimpanzee mothers were shot and the infants taken from the forest and smuggled to collectors in Asia, Europe and America. Reynolds returned to Uganda in 1990 to determine whether a viable population of chimpanzees still existed in Budongo. By 1995 some fifty individuals had been identified, and this figure remained constant until 2000 when the numbers started rising, thought to be due to an influx of chimpanzees from other areas.

The research team renovated and occupied buildings that had been constructed for the Budongo Sawmills Ltd. In 2005 funding for the project was provided by the RZSS at Edinburgh Zoo, as well as a number of other sources. The Budongo Forest Project became a Ugandan NGO and was renamed the Budongo Conservation Field Station.

Richard Byrne, Cat Hobaiter and colleagues have been based at the Field Station to studying chimpanzee communication in the twenty-first century. A research by International Union for Conservation of Nature and Natural Resources by Howard P. C in 1991 published a detailed research finding on wildlife and forest reserves in Uganda entitled Nature Conservation in Uganda's Tropical Forest Reserve.

== See also ==
- Central Forest Reserves of Uganda
- Mabira Forest
- Wambabya Central Forest Reserve
