= Ruzaire Central Forest Reserve =

Forest in Uganda

Ruzaire Central Forest Reserve is a protected high forest located in Kibaale district which is located within the Albertine Region. It covers an area of 1194.94 hectares. It is managed by the National Forestry Authority.

== Setting and geography ==
Ruzaire Central Forest Reserve covers an area of 1194.94 hectares. It is located in the Muzizi zone. It is used for both ecological and environmental purposes.The Muzizi zone extends from Kikuube to Ntoroko districts through Kibale, Kakumiro, Kyenjojo, Kyegegwa and Mubende.

Location coordinates are: 0.9857°N 30.9728°E

The forest is a water catchment area for both River Ruzaire which drains into Nkuse and Muzizi rivers.

== Wildlife ==
The forest is a home for different wildlife species such as chimpanzees, monkeys such as Redtailed monkeys and birds.

== Conservation status ==
In 2017, National Forestry Authority sought to hire all the forest reserves which included Ruzaire Central forest reserve on a 49-year lease basis to people who wanted to use them for commercial tree growing.

The National Forestry Authority (NFA) was dragged to court and the Banyoro community organization, Bunyoro Kitara Reparations Agency (BUKITAREPA) demanded that NFA should be stopped from issuing licenses in forest reserves which included Ruzaire and also cancel the existing .

In 2014, the National Forestry Authority (NFA) received 2 billion Ugandan shillings that was to be used in marking of boundaries of 18 central forest reserves that included; Ruzaire, Kananga, Kagombe in various districts of Uganda such as Kibaale, Mubende, Kyenjojo among others.

== Threats ==
Commercial farming for trees and sugarcanes, encroachment, growing numbers immigrants from the neighbouring countries such as Rwanda who grab the forest reserve land, high deforestation, illegal commercial logging, politicians stopping evictions to use it for getting votes from their voters, deforestation.

== See also ==
1. Albertine Rift montane forests
2. Nyamakere
3. Nyabyeya
4. Nyabiku
5. List of Central Forest Reserves of Uganda
