= KCU =

KCU or kcu may refer to:

- Kansas City University, a private medical school in Missouri, United States
- Kapiti Coast United, a New Zealand association football club
- Kentucky Christian University, a private Christian university in Kentucky, United States
- King Ceasor University, an Ugandan private university
- Korean Children's Union, a North Korean political youth organization
- KCU, the IATA code for Masindi Airport, Uganda
- kcu, the ISO 639-3 code for Kami language (Tanzania)
