= Adriaan Kortlandt =

Dutch ethologist (1918–2009)

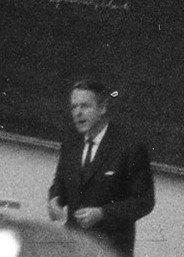
- Kortlandt in 1966
- Born: 25 January 1918; Rotterdam
- Died: 18 October 2009 (aged 91); Amsterdam
- Education: University of Amsterdam
- Known for: Research on cormorants and apes
- Scientific career
- Fields: Ethology
- Doctoral advisor: Johannes Abraham Bierens de Haan

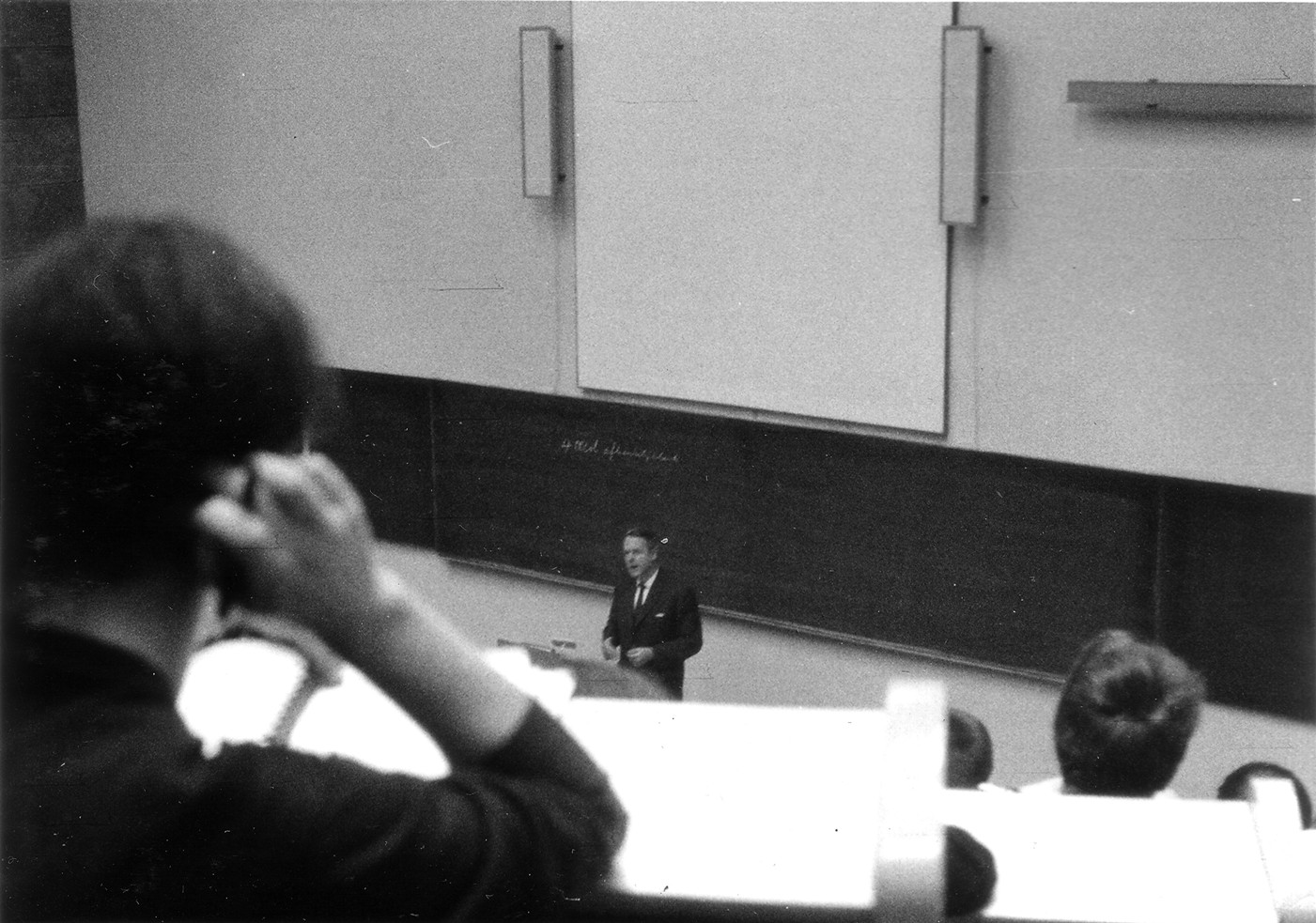
Adriaan Kortlandt, lecturing in 1966.

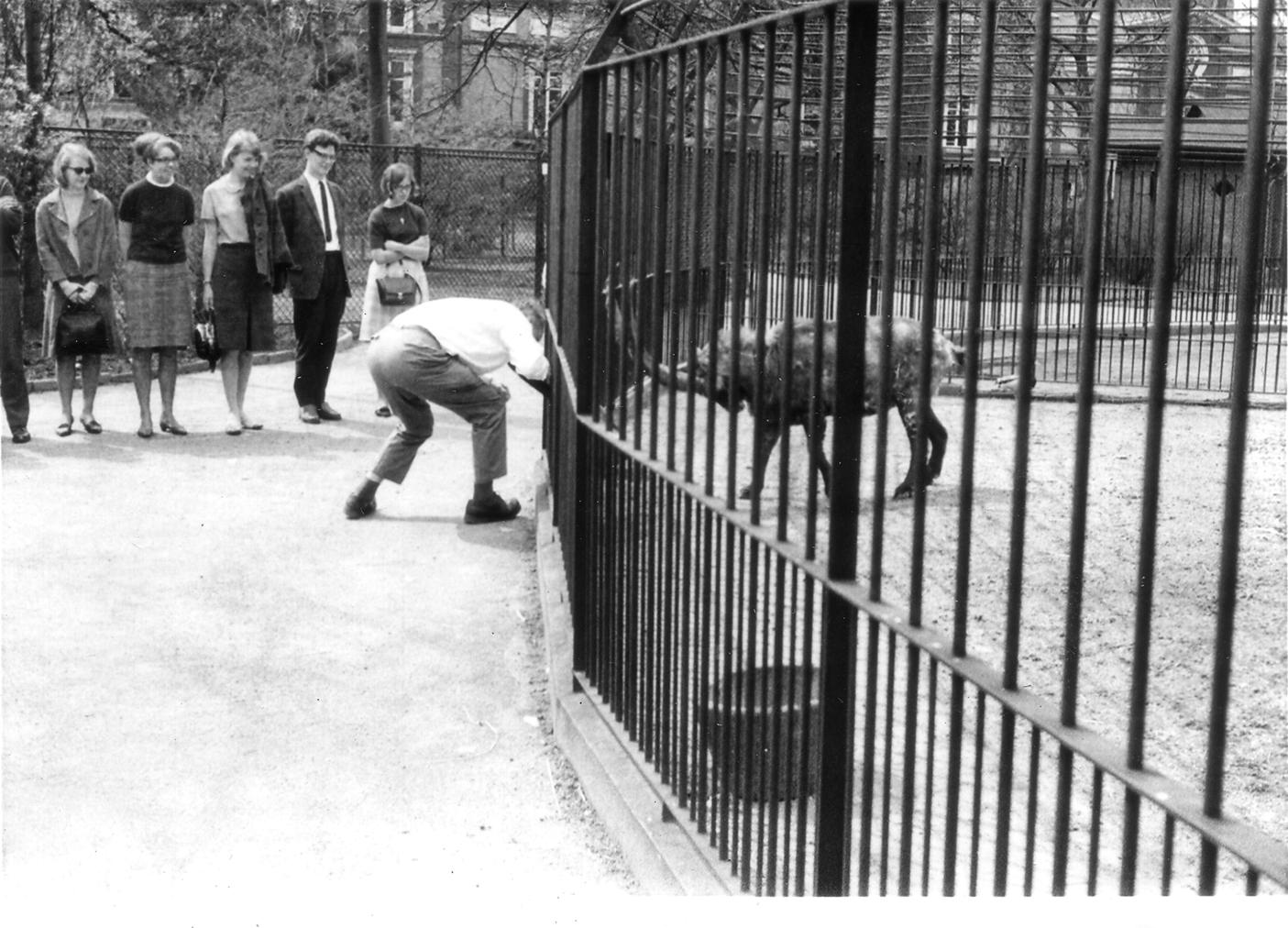
Kortlandt demonstrates how a goat responds to his goatlike attack.

Adriaan Kortlandt (25 January 1918, Rotterdam – 18 October 2009, Amsterdam) was a Dutch ethologist. He has been described together with Vernon Reynolds and Jane Goodall as "...one of a trio of pioneers ... who founded field studies of chimpanzees in the 1960s."

== Early life and education ==
Adriaan Kortlandt was born on 25 January 1918 in Rotterdam, Netherlands. From a young age he was fascinated by animal behaviors, spending time observing cormorants near his home.

as a teenager in the Dutch city of Rotterdam, Adriaan Kortlandt would often get on his bicycle after school and pedal out to a nature park in the suburb of Lekkerkerk. He spent long hours alone there, watching and photographing a colony of cormorants, a pelican-like bird, as they built their nests and dove into the water to catch fish.

Kortlandt studied biology at the University of Utrecht, carrying out his PhD research at the University of Amsterdam on cormorant behaviors. After obtaining his doctorate in 1949, he researched avian instincts using field observation.

== Cormorants ==
Kortlandt studied the instinctive behaviors of cormorants from a young age. His detailed observations pioneered new methods for studying animal behavior patterns in birds. His work provided insights into the rigid nature of instinctive behaviors in cormorants and their importance for species survival. However, when Kortlandt suggested his findings could inform human psychology and medicine, it brought him into conflict with contemporaries like Niko Tinbergen. They believed animal behaviors should be studied as biological phenomena in their own right, not crudely anthropomorphized. This disagreement led Kortlandt to shift his focus to studying primate behaviors.

== Displacement ==
In 1940, both Kortlandt and Tinbergen independently identified the behavioural phenomenon that is now called displacement activity (Dutch: overspronggedrag)and the hierarchy of instincts.

if in a cormorant or an avocet a fighting impulse is thwarted for one reason or another, the bird will perform sexual and nesting behaviour. Further, if a sexual impulse is thwarted, the bird will peck its mate or make nesting movements. A nesting impulse when thwarted may give rise to sexual or fighting activities. ("Vice-versa principle".) Apparently there exists some nervous mechanism or centre uniting or connecting these three activities and this mechanism or centre.

== 1965 Experiments with Chimpanzees ==
In 1965, Adriaan Kortlandt conducted experiments with chimpanzees to understand the defense mechanisms of early humans against predators. He introduced a stuffed leopard electronic moving head to a group of chimpanzees. The chimpanzees responded by attacking the leopard using sticks and amplified their assault with loud screams and hoots. These observations, combined with the behavior of wild chimpanzees, indicated to him that early humans might have used objects like sticks and rocks for defense and attacked predators collectively.

== 1980 Experiments with Lions ==
In 1980, Kortlandt carried out experiments on the defense strategies of early small-posture hominids in collaboration with George Adamson. He tested ideas that thorn weapons might have deterred predators from early humans by putting meat under thorn branches and observing lion reactions.

The most striking phenomenon was their obvious fear of hurting the pads of their paws on the spines. They could easily have swept away the thorn branches, or lifted them up, with just one gentle movement of a paw, but they were much too afraid to do so.

Kortlandt also built a robotic model early human ancestor with movable thorns for arms. When experimentally placed near wild lions, they were frightened away by its jerky motions and whipping thorns. Kortlandt concluded even simple thorn branches could have helped early humans intimidate predators on the dangerous African savannahs.

== Other work ==
He also was the author of the "Rift Valley theory", better known under the name given by French paleoanthropologist Yves Coppens: "East Side Story".

== Select publications ==
- Kleindienst, M. R., Burton, F. D., & Kortlandt, A. (1975). On new perspectives on ape and human evolution. Current Anthropology, 16(4), 644–651.

== Filmography ==
WITH CHIMPANZEES IN THE WILD (1992) University of Amsterdam (Audiovisual Centre)
