= Karuma Wildlife Reserve =

Forest in Uganda

Karuma Wildlife Reserve is a protected area located in Kiryandongo District in Uganda. It covers an area of 675.0 km^{2} (82000 hectares). It is managed by Uganda Wildlife Authority under the supervision of Ministry of Tourism, Wildlife and Antiquities. Its World Database on Protected Areas (WDPA) ID is 1439. It is on IUCN Management Category III. It was declared a Wildlife Reserve in 1964 but it was a controlled hunting area in 1962.

== Geography ==
Karuma Wildlife Reserve is located next to Murchison falls national park.

== Wildlife ==
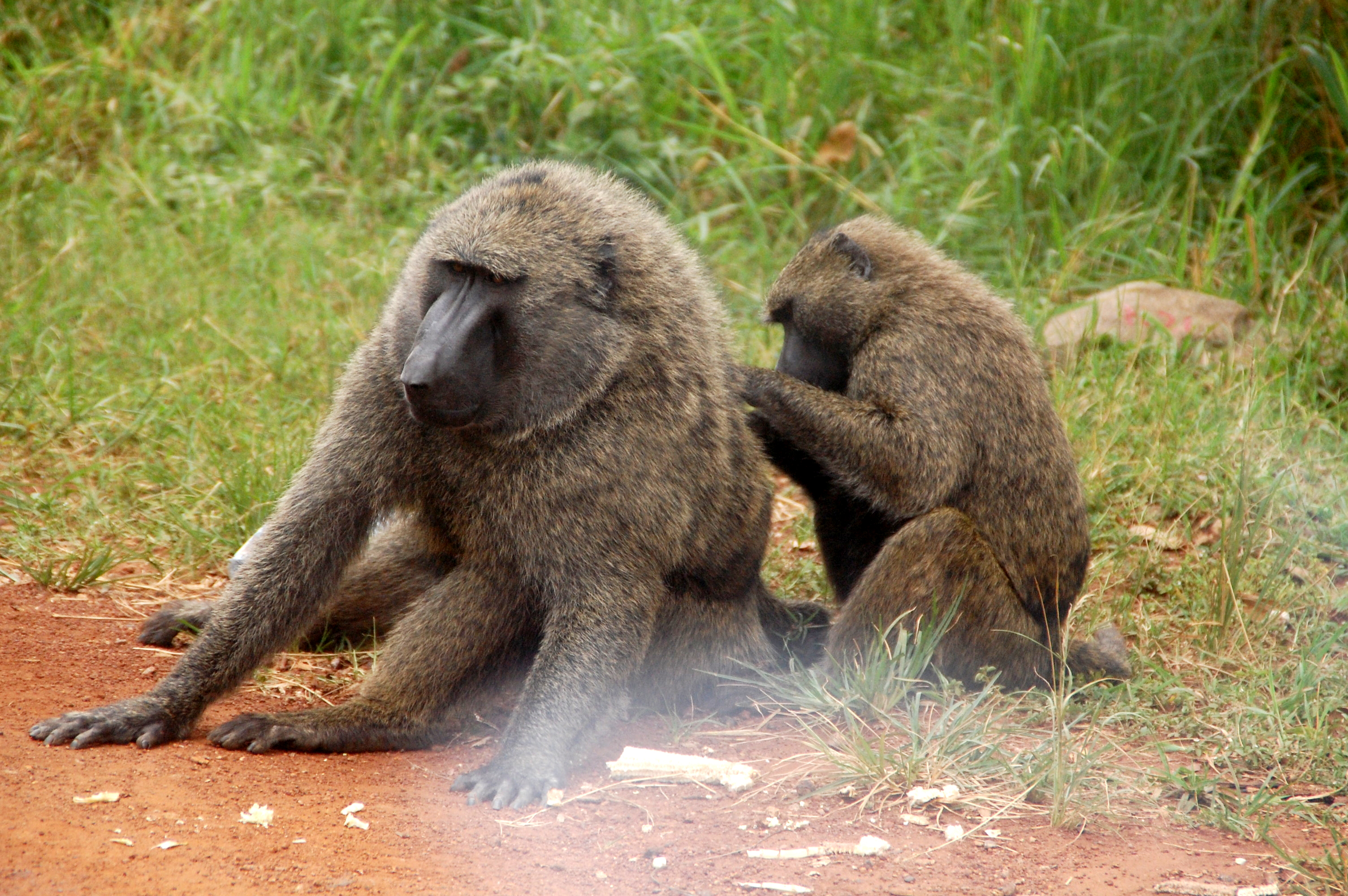
Baboons at Karuma falls

This reserve is a home to many species of animals which include Olive Baboons, Vervet monkeys, giraffes, elephants, hippos, leopards among other animals; bird species which include pied kingfisher, yellow-throated leaf, red-throated bee-eater, Giant heron among other bird species.

== Conservation status ==
Karuma Hydro power plant that generates 600 Megawatts was constructed within the Karuma wildlife reserve following the environmental guidelines of National Environment Management Authority (NEMA).

== See also ==
- Bugungu Wildlife Reserve
- List of Wildlife Reserves of Uganda
- List of Local Forest Reserves of Uganda
- Uganda Wildlife Authority
