= Cat Hobaiter =

British primatologist

Catherine (Cat) Hobaiter
- Education: University of St Andrews, UK
- Known for: gestural communication
- Scientific career
- Fields: Primatology
- Workplaces: University of St Andrews, UK; Budongo Forest Reserve
- Thesis: Gestural communication in wild chimpanzees (2011)
- Doctoral advisor: Richard Byrne

Catherine (Cat) Hobaiter is a British-Lebanese primatologist focusing on social behaviour in wild chimpanzees and involved in long-term studies of chimpanzees in the Budongo Forest Reserve in Uganda and the MoyenBafing National Park in Guinea. She is particularly interested in the role gestures play in communication. She is a Reader at the University of St Andrews.

== Career ==
Hobaiter is based at the University of St Andrews but spends considerable amounts of time on field research in Uganda. She gained tenure in 2013.

Her undergraduate degree started her interest in comparative behaviour and contact with Richard Byrne from St Andrews University led to her first four months fieldwork looking for baboons in Budongo Forest Reserve, working from the Budongo Conservation Field Station. She soon changed to studying wild gorillas and chimpanzees, and especially the Sonso chimpanzee group at the reserve that has been accustomed to humans since the 1990s.

Her work has studied the use of gestures in communication by great apes, especially chimpanzees, in the wild. This requires filming gestures for detailed analysis and, prior to her work, this had been undertaken primarily in zoos or wildlife parks. Her studies have gradually developed a catalogue of around 80 gestures that form a language common to several groups of wild apes, measured in terms of 'apparently satisfactory outcomes' (ASO) after assessing many records. A citizen science project showed that some of the gestures are also understood by humans. Hobaiter is also involved in habituating a second group of chimpanzees in the Budongo Forest, the Waibira group, which will allow wider comparisons of the use of gestures for communication in the wild.

The film recordings also revealed other aspects of chimpanzee life, such as adoption of new tools for drinking.

Her research now focuses on how human language evolved, through studying the use of gestures in both humans and great apes. The idea that a gestural system could have evolved into a spoken language as used by humans, is controversial but study of the gestures used by children before they can speak, as well as gestures widespread among chimpanzees can provide information to inform the debate.

== Publications ==
She has been the author or co-author of over 65 scientific publications, including:

- Catherine Hobaiter (2020) The importance of being in situ Current Biology 30 R199-R201
- Juan Olvido Perea-García, Mariska E. Kret, Antónia Monteiro, Catherine Hobaiter (2019) Scleral pigmentation leads to conspicuous, not cryptic, eye morphology in chimpanzees Proceedings of the National Academy of Sciences of the United States of America 116 19248–19250
- Andrea Knox, Joey Markx, Emma How, Abdul Azis, Catherine Hobaiter, Frank J.F. van Veen, Helen Morrogh-Bernard (2019) Gesture use in communication between mothers and offspring in wild orang-utans (Pongo pygmaeus wurmbii) from the Sabangau peat-swamp forest, Borneo International Journal of Primatology 40 393–416
- Byrne, R. W., Cartmill, E., Genty, E., Graham, K. E., Hobaiter, C. & Tanner, J. (2017) Great ape gestures: intentional communication with a rich set of innate signals. Animal Cognition 20 755-769
- Gruber, T., Poisot, T., Zuberbuehler, K., Hoppitt, W. & Hobaiter, C. (2015) The spread of a novel behaviour in wild chimpanzees: new insights into the ape cultural mind. Communicative and Integrative Biology 8 e1017164.
- Wilson, M. L., Boesch, C., Fruth, B., Furuichi, T., Gilby, I. C., Hashimoto, C., Hobaiter, C., Hohmann, G., Itoh, N., Koops, K., Lloyd, J. N., Matsuzawa, T., Mitani, J. C., Mjungu, D. C., Morgan, D., Muller, M. N., Mundry, R., Nakamura, M., Pruetz, J., Pusey, A. E. & 10 others (2014) Lethal aggression in Pan is better explained by adaptive strategies than human impacts Nature. 513 414-417
- Hobaiter, C. & Byrne, R. W., (2014) The meanings of chimpanzee gestures Current Biology 24 1596-1600
- Hobaiter, C. & Byrne, R. W., (2011) The gestural repertoire of the wild chimpanzee Animal Cognition 14 745-767
- Genty, E. J. P., Breuer, T., Hobaiter, C. L. & Byrne, R. W., (2009) Gestural communication of the gorilla (Gorilla gorilla): repertoire, intentionality, and possible origins Animal Cognition 12 527-546

== Awards and recognition ==
In 2016 she became vice president for Communications, International Primatological Society.

Hobaiter was the guest on the BBC Radio 4 programme The Life Scientific in May 2018.

In August 2020, Hobaiter was a guest on the BBC Radio 4 programme The Infinite Monkey Cage to discuss how understanding of chimpanzees has changed since the 1960s.

== Personal life ==
Catherine (Cat) Hobaiter initially lived in Lebanon, returning to the UK when she was a child. She studied B. Sc. Biological Sciences at the University of Edinburgh. After graduating she worked in commercial project management for a short time but then obtained funding for the doctoral research that marked the start of her academic career. Her PhD was awarded by University of St Andrews in 2011.
