= Felix Kulayigye =

Ugandan military officer and politician

- Born: 1964 (age 61–62); Masaka District, Uganda
- Citizenship: Uganda
- Education: Makerere University (Bachelor of Arts in Education) (Master of Arts in Economic Policy and Planning)
- Title: Spokesperson; Uganda People's Defence Force & Ministry of Defence and Veteran Affairs (MODVA).
- Spouse: Justine Bagonza
- Military career
- Allegiance: Uganda
- Branch: Ugandan Land Forces
- Service years: 1989–present
- Rank: Major general
- Conflicts: War in Uganda (1986–1994); Lord's Resistance Army insurgency

Felix Kulayigye is a Ugandan military officer who serves as the incumbent spokesperson of the Ugandan People's Defence Force (UPDF) since February 2022. He has served in the position twice, and first served as UPDF's spokesperson from 2006 to 2013.

Previously, he was the Political Commissar of the UPDF and concurrently served as a Member of Parliament, representing the UPDF.

== Background ==
Kulayigye was born circa 1964 to Fredrick Semichacha and Regina Abagirinka in Gayaza Village, in Masaka District. The family migrated from Kisoro District, eventually settling in present-day Bukomansimbi District. He is the last-born in a family of nine siblings. His mother died soon after Kulayigye was born and he grew up in an orphanage in Rutshuru in Kisoro District.

== Education ==
He attended several primary schools, completing P7 at St. Herman Nkoni Boys' Primary School in Masaka. He attended Kabalega Secondary School for O-Level and Kololo High School for A-Level. Later, he entered Makerere University, graduating with a Bachelor of Arts in Education, in 1989. Still later, he studied for a Master of Arts in Economic Policy and Planning, also at Makerere University.

== Military career ==
He joined Uganda's armed forces in 1989, after completing his first university degree. He saw combat in Northern Uganda against the Lord's Resistance Army. While there, he served as a platoon commander. Later, from 2005 to 2013, he served as the UPDF Spokesperson. Still later, he served as the Chief Political Commissar. In 2016, he was elected to serve as a Member of Parliament representing the UPDF in the 10th Parliament (2016 to 2021). He spent some time in the Presidential Protection Unit, which today is part of the Special Forces Command in the UPDF.

In February 2019, he was promoted from the rank of colonel to brigadier, in a military promotions exercise that involved more than 2,000 UPDF men and women.

Brigadier General Felix Kulayigye was, in February 2022, re-appointed as the UPDF Spokesperson, by the Commander-in-Chief, General Yoweri Museveni. Felix Kulayigye replaced Brigadier Flavia Byekwaso, who was sent on a course at the National Defence College, Uganda in Njeru, Buikwe District.

== Other consideration ==
Felix Kulayigye is married to Justine Bagonza and together are the parents of three daughters and two sons.

== See also ==
- Moses Ddiba Ssentongo
- Fred Tolit
