= Masindi Airport =

- IATA: KCU; ICAO: HUMI

Summary
- Airport type: Public
- Owner: Civil Aviation Authority of Uganda
- Serves: Masindi
- Location: Masindi, Uganda
- Elevation AMSL: 3,850 ft (1,170 m)
- Coordinates: 01°45′18″N 031°44′12″E

Map
- Location of Masindi Airport in Uganda

Runways
Direction	Length		Surface
Direction	m	ft	Surface
01/19	2,042	6,700	Unpaved
- Sources: Great Circle Mapper

Masindi Airport (IATA: KCU, ICAO: HUMI) is an airport in Uganda.

== Location ==
Masindi Airport is in the Kyema suburb of the town of Masindi, Masindi District, Bunyoro sub-region, in the Western Region. It is approximately 199 kilometres (124 mi), by air, north-west of Entebbe International Airport, the country's largest civilian and military airport. This is approximately 10 kilometres (6 mi), by road, directly north of the central business district of the town.

The Masindi non-directional beacon (ident: MS) is within the town, approximately 6 kilometres (3.7 mi) south of the Runway 01 threshold.

== See also ==
- List of airports in Uganda
- Transport in Uganda
- Uganda Civil Aviation Authority
