= Management and conservation of wetlands in Uganda =

Overview of wetland management and conservation in Uganda

The wetlands of Uganda are highly treasured natural resources that cover 30,105 square kilometres (11,624 sq mi) of Uganda's total land area of 241,500 square kilometres (93,200 sq mi) accounting to 13% of the total land area. In Uganda, wetlands are locally utilized surrounding communities for construction, agriculture, tourism, crafts, furniture, fishing, human settlement and extraction of useful materials, wild fruits and hunting grounds.

As the National Resistance Movement Government took over power in 1986, there existed devastating social, economic, political, environmental and poor wetlands management. In its efforts to restore sanity, the government in their first eight months undertook drastic measures to restore and avert the destruction of wetlands. Through administrative guidelines issued in September 1986, the government begun the restoration of wetland resources by instituting a ban on large-scale drainage schemes until scientifically proven and socially harmonious policy was put in place.

== Wetland funding ==
Restoration efforts for Uganda's wetlands are received funding from the Global Environment Facility under a new climate adaptation project, which recognizes the significance of wetlands in protecting local communities from climate change. The funding enables alternative climate-resilient livelihoods to reduce pressure on nature and biodiversity. This is a five-year project costing over US$4.3 million of funding and will be executed by Uganda's Ministry of Water and Environment, with support from the UN Environment Programme (UNEP).

== The legal framework ==
Parliament of Uganda has passed legal frameworks that obligates government to hold in trust for the people and to protect, natural lakes, rivers, wetlands, forest reserves, game reserves, national parks and any land to be reserved for ecological and touristic purposes for the common good of all citizens. These include the Land Act (Cap. 227) which prohibits the government from leasing or alienating wetlands. Another legal framework protecting the environment is the National Environment Act 2019.

== Conservation ==
The government of Uganda has initiated conservation drives and campaigns to conserve wetlands across the country. Organizations and Partners under the Commercial Flowere Farms Integrated Catchment Management Partnership came together to fight wetlands degradation around Greater Kampala since 2022.

== Challenges ==
Wetland conservation in Uganda has faced numerous challenges and these include the growing population driving encroachment into wetlands for settlement, agriculture and for other resources. In the recent census conducted by UBOS in 2014 indicates population growth at a rate of 3.2% per annum and has almost tripled from 12.6 million in 1980 to 34.8 million in 2014. This has hampered government efforts in protecting wetland resources and law enforcement and evictions are the alternatives government has resorted to over the years.

== See also ==
- National Forestry Authority
- Health in Uganda
