= List of Local Forest Reserves of Uganda =

In Uganda, a Local Forest Reserve are managed by the National Forestry Authority (NFA) under the National Forestry and Tree Planting Act 8/2003.

The NFA is mandated to manage all 506 Forest Reserves in Uganda. These reserves are part of the protected areas of Uganda.

List of Local Forest Reserves in Uganda:

Rank	Name	Geodata	Size (km^{2} )	District	Notes
1	Katenta		5.10	Kabarole District	
2	Kebisoni		6.48	Rukungiri District	
3	Kagogo		2.52	Rukungiri District	
4	Kibale		1.45	Kibale District	
5	Butebe		6.79	Kabarole District	
6	Butiti		2.33	Kabarole District	
7	Hoima		4.90	Hoima District	
8	Ibanda		14.37	Mbarara District	
9	Kabwohe		3.09	Bushenyi District	
10	Kahunge		4.89	Kabarole District	
11	Kakumiro		25.84	Kibale District	
12	Kanyampara		62.36	Kasese District	
13	Kihihi		35.86	Rukungiri District	
14	Kijubya		27.08	Hoima District	
15	Kooga		10.93	Bushenyi District	
16	Kyamuhunga		7.83	Bushenyi District	
17	Mpara		1.21	Kabarole District	
18	Nyabirongo		16.12	Kasese District	
19	Nyakinoni		5.25	Kabarole District	
20	Nyantungo		5.78	Kabarole District	
21	Nyakigumba		10.83	Kabarole District	
22	Nyakikindo		38.64	Bundibugyo District	

== See also ==
- Albertine Rift montane forests
- List of Central Forest Reserves of Uganda
- List of Wildlife Reserves of Uganda
