= Uganda Forestry Working Group =

Uganda-based organization

Uganda Forestry Working Group (UFWG)
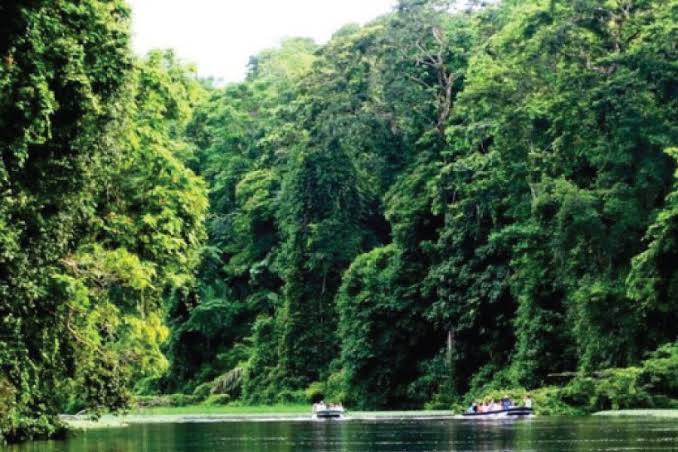
- Formation: 2021-01-08
- Headquarters: Plot 475/523 Sonko Lane, Kabalagala, Gaba Road
- Website: http://ufwg.envalert.org/

Uganda Forestry Working Group (UFWG) is a Uganda-based organization and an informal network of forestry stakeholders, civil society organizations, academic and research institutions engaged in the development and sustainability of the forestry sector in Uganda that are multidisciplinary cutting across several sectors of national development. It was founded in 2001 to influence the development of the forestry sector and to independently monitor the implementation of the National Forestry Policy and the National Forest Plan (NFP).

== Partnerships ==
UFWG partners with National NGOs, Community Based Organizations, Forest Resource User associations, Academia and research institutions and individual members that are engaged in the development and sustainability of the forestry sector in Uganda. From 2014 to 2016, Uganda Forestry Working Group, Food and Agriculture Organization of the United Nations (FAO) and the Forest Sector Support Department (FSSD) under the Ministry of Water and Environment (MWE) with financial support from the Department for International Development of the United Kingdom implemented the project "Enhancing forest tenure and governance in Uganda" to pilot the process of registration of private forests and the declaration of community forests in Uganda, as provided for, but never implemented, in the 2003 National Forest and Tree Planting Act.

== See also ==
- Food and Agriculture Organization
- Ministry of Water and Environment (Uganda)
- National Forestry Authority
