= Katenta Local Forest Reserve =

Protected forest located in Uganda

Katenta Local Forest Reserve is protected forest that is located in Kabarole District in western Uganda within the Ugandan Albertine Rift. It is managed by National Forestry Authority. Its WPDA ID is 315231. It was declared a forest reserve in 1965. It covers an area of 5.10 km^{2}.

Kabarole District in Uganda

== Threats ==
Increasing population of immigrants from the neighbouring countries such as DRC who have cleared the forest cover with in the 15 km radius of the Kyaka II settlement where Katenta Local forest reserve.

== See also ==
1. National Forestry Authority
2. List of Central Forest Reserves of Uganda
3. Lakes of Uganda
