= Barifa Forest =

Barifa Forest is a forest near Arua in the Northern Region of Uganda. Located southeast of Arua Hill, it extends up to Mvara and Muni. It was gazetted in 1948 but may soon be degazetted after consultations to pave way for the Nile Eco-City, a satellite city in Arua Municipality. The new forest will be located in Logiri, Vurra County.

== Activities ==
A few crops are grown in some areas and cattle grazing also takes place because of abundant grass. The Dorcus Inzikuru Stadium is also within the forest and can be accessed from Weatherhead Park Lane or Muni Road. The panoramic view on top of Arua Hill's East Side gives you a view of the forest canopy.
