= Murchison Falls National Park =

National park in Western Region, Uganda

- Kabalega National Park
- IUCN category II (national park)
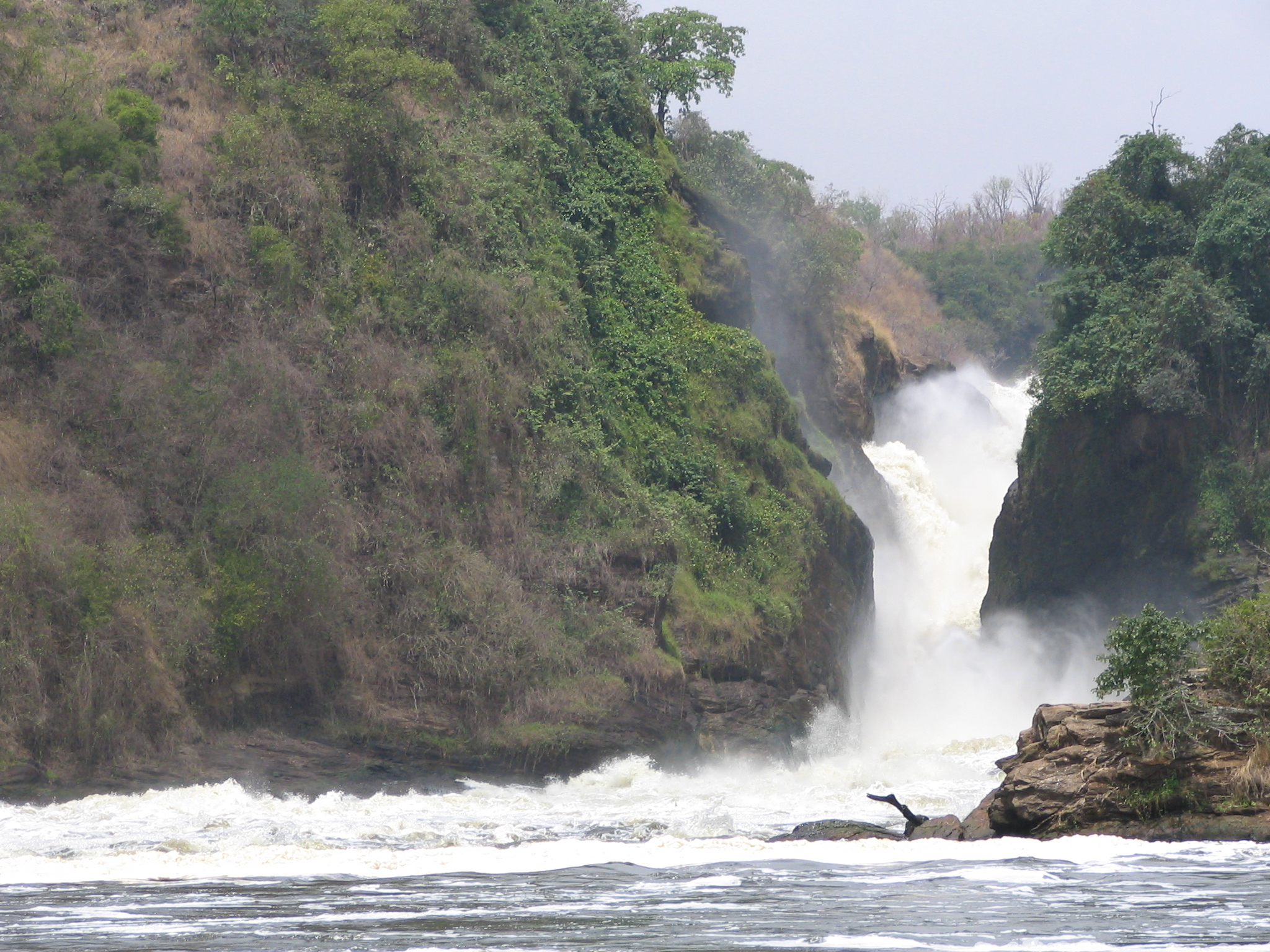
- Murchison Falls

- Location within Uganda
- Location: Uganda
- Nearest city: Masindi
- Coordinates: 02°11′15″N 31°46′53″E
- Area: 3,893 km^{2} (1,503 sq mi)
- Established: 1952
- Governing body: Ugandan Wildlife Authority

Ramsar Wetland
- Official name: Murchison Falls-Albert Delta Wetland System
- Designated: 15 September 2006
- Reference no.: 1640

Murchison Falls National Park is a national park in Uganda managed by the Ugandan Wildlife Authority. Located in north-western Uganda, it spreads inland from the shores of Lake Albert around the Victoria Nile up to the Karuma Falls.

Together with the adjacent 748 km^{2} (289 sq mi) Bugungu Wildlife Reserve and the 720 km^{2} (280 sq mi) Karuma Wildlife Reserve, the park forms the Murchison Falls Conservation Area.

== Location ==
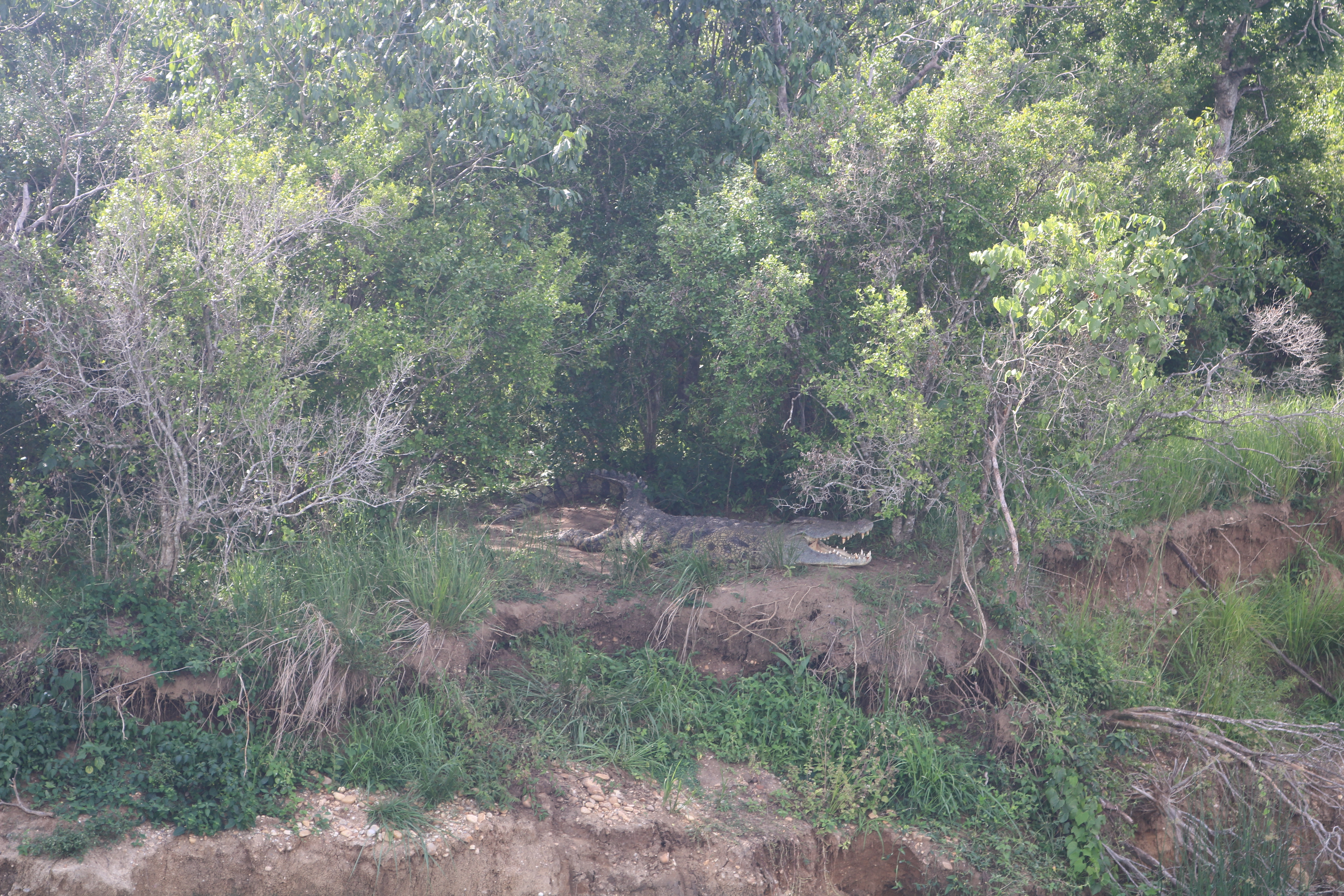
Crocodile along River Nile in Murchison Falls National Park

The park straddles the Ugandan districts of Buliisa, Nwoya, Kiryandongo, and Masindi.

== History ==
The explorers John Speke and James Grant were the first Europeans to visit the present day MFCA in 1862. It was more thoroughly explored by Samuel and Florence Baker in 1863–4. Baker named the falls Murchison Falls after the geologist Roderick Murchison, then the president of the Royal Geographical Society.

Between 1907 and 1912, the inhabitants of an area of about 13,000 km^{2} (5,000 sq mi) were evacuated due to sleeping sickness spread by tsetse flies. In 1910, the Bunyoro Game Reserve was created south of the River Nile. That area roughly corresponds to the part of the MFNP that is in the districts of Buliisa, Masindi, and Kiryandongo. In 1928, the boundaries were extended north of the river into the modern-day Nwoya District.

In 1952, the British administration established the National Parks Act of Uganda. The area described above became Murchison Falls National Park.

In 1972 Idi Amin's military dictatorship renamed the park to Kabalega National Park as part of its Africanization campaign, honoring the Chwa II Kabalega of Bunyoro. The name later reverted to Murchison.

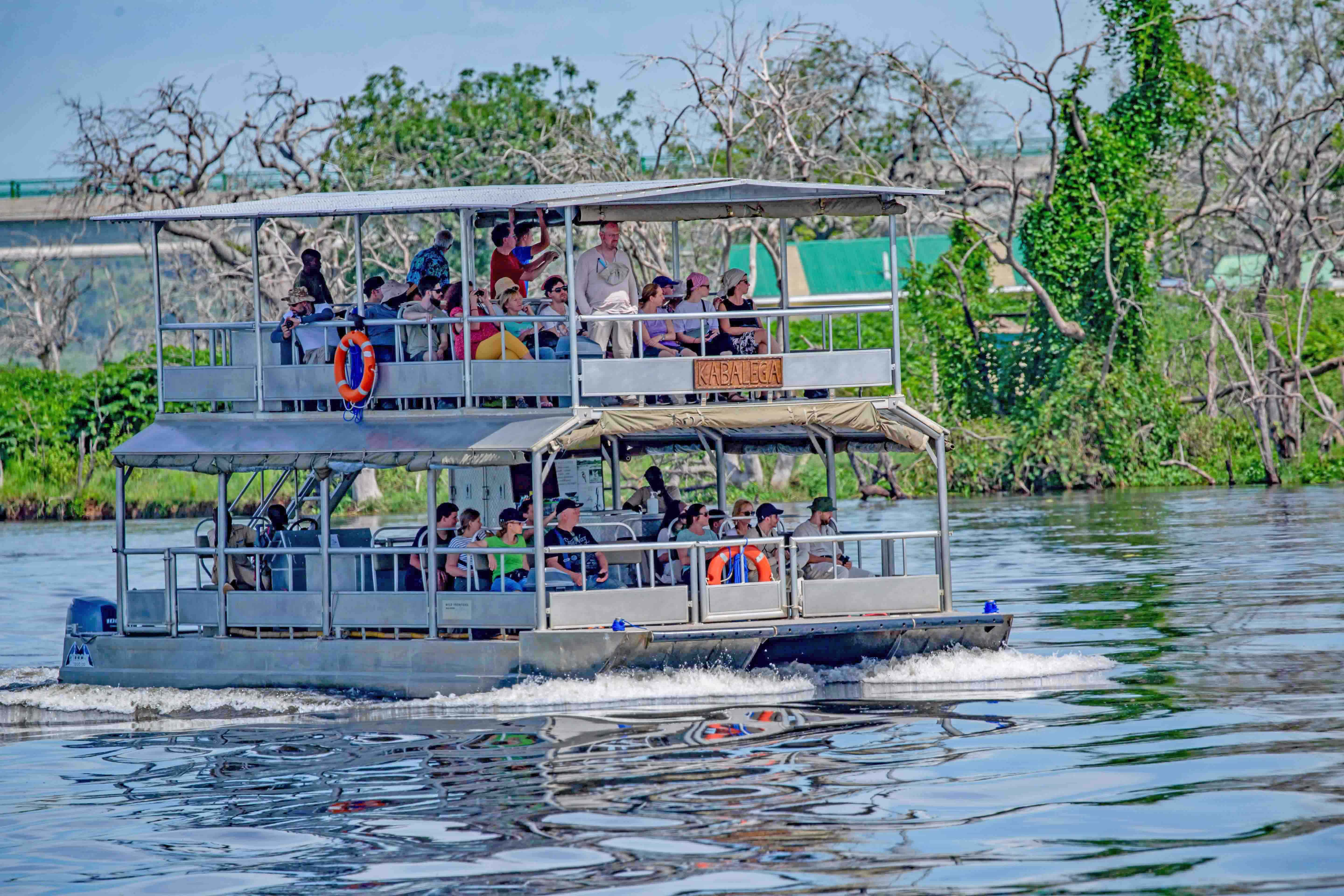
Murchison Falls National Park

== Overview ==
Murchison Falls National Park is Uganda's largest national park with approximately 3,893 km^{2} (1,503 sq mi). The park is bisected by the Victoria Nile from east to west for a distance of about 115 km (71 mi). The park is the location of the Murchison Falls, where the waters of the Nile flow through a narrow gorge only 7 m (23 ft) wide before plunging 43 m (141 ft).

Adjacent to the Masindi-Gulu Highway are the Karuma Falls, the location of the 600 megawatt Karuma Power Station, which is Uganda's largest power station since it came online 2023.

As of 2022, the East African Crude Oil Pipeline being built includes the construction of 10 oil well pads, a feeder pipeline, and a refinery in and around the Murchison Falls National Park.

== Wildlife ==
Since 2005, the protected area is considered a Lion Conservation Unit. In 2010, it was estimated that only 250 giraffes were in the park. A population of 37 Rothschild's giraffes was transferred from the north side of the Nile River to the south side in 2016 and 2017, when population was around 1,500.

Murchison Falls National Park and the adjacent Budongo Forest Reserve host 76 mammal species such as chimpanzees as well as Uganda's largest Nile crocodile population. There are 450 known bird species including the shoe-billed stork, dwarf kingfisher, Goliath heron, white-thighed hornbill and great blue turaco.

== See also ==
- List of national parks of Uganda
