= Vernon Reynolds =

British biological anthropologist (born 1935)

- Born: 14 December 1935 (age 90)
- Education: Collyer's School, Horsham University College, London
- Known for: Study of chimpanzees, founder of the Budongo Conservation Field Station

Vernon Reynolds (born 14 December 1935) is a British biological anthropologist known for his research on chimpanzee behavior and as founder of the Budongo Conservation Field Station. He has been described as "...one of a trio of pioneers (Jane Goodall and Adriaan Kortlandt being the others) who founded field studies of chimpanzees in the 1960s."

== Education ==
Reynolds was educated at Collyer's School, Horsham and University College, London.

He taught anthropology at the University of Bristol from 1966 to 1972, when he was appointed University Lecturer in Biological Anthropology at the University of Oxford. He continued to teach at Oxford later becoming Professor and a Fellow of Magdalen College until his retirement in 2001. Today, he holds the title as Emeritus Professor.

== Research ==
=== Budongo Conversation Field Station ===
In 1990, Reynolds founded the Budongo Conservation Field Station (BCFS) in the Budongo Forest in Uganda. The purpose of the station is to conduct scientific research on primates, lead conservation efforts, and serve as a model for sustainable rainforest management.

Originally, the station was called the Budongo Forest Project when Reynolds studied and protected about 800 chimpanzees in the forest. In 1988, as Uganda faced a civil war, Reynolds read a news report from a major Ugandan newspaper concerning chimpanzee infants being smuggled as pets for wealthy individuals in Dubai. Motivated by the report, he spent the next year seeking funds to establish a base committed to research the chimpanzee population changes in the Budongo forest. After securing initial funding from the Jane Goodall Institute, Reynolds' crew was able to construct trails in the forest to gain better access with the chimpanzees.

Today, Reynolds remains involved with the BCFS serving in a supporting role as a member of the board of directors and as senior advisor.

=== Study on Chimpanzee Culture ===
In 1999, Reynolds, Jane Goodall, and his research team published an extensive study on the cultural variation of chimpanzees. Their study expanded on some of the previously known chimpanzees' behavioral patterns. The study revealed 39 behavioral patterns that differed in various communities. Reynolds and his team observed that certain behaviors such as grooming, courtship, and tool use, were present in various chimpanzee communities but absent in others. The study described their cultural findings as drawing resemblance to human cultures, a feature that was once unapparent in other species.

== Books ==
The focus of Reynolds's 2005 book, The Chimpanzees of the Budongo Forest: Ecology Behaviour and Conservation, is on his 15 years account on the Sonso chimpanzee community. The Sonso community is a group of fifty chimpanzees that resides in the Budongo Forest.

The book described the community's social organization, diet, culture, behavioral adaptations while living in the complex environment of the Budongo Forest. Reynolds described the mating rituals, with the Sonso females arranging male to male competition rather than actively seeking males with the most desirable characteristics.

Toward the end of the book, Reynolds discussed some of the threats that the Sonso community faced and issues with conservation efforts, including revenge huntings from hostilities with the local people and accidental killings from snares. To improve the Sonsos' chance of survival, Reynolds called for the establishment of a buffer zone between the forests and the fields. He also advocated educating the locals on chimpanzee conservation efforts.

== Awards ==
In 2020, he was awarded the Lifetime Achievement Award by the International Primatological Society (IPS). He was honored for his research, conservation contributions, and advancement of education toward non-human primates.
