= Johannes Abraham Bierens de Haan =

Dutch biologist and ethologist

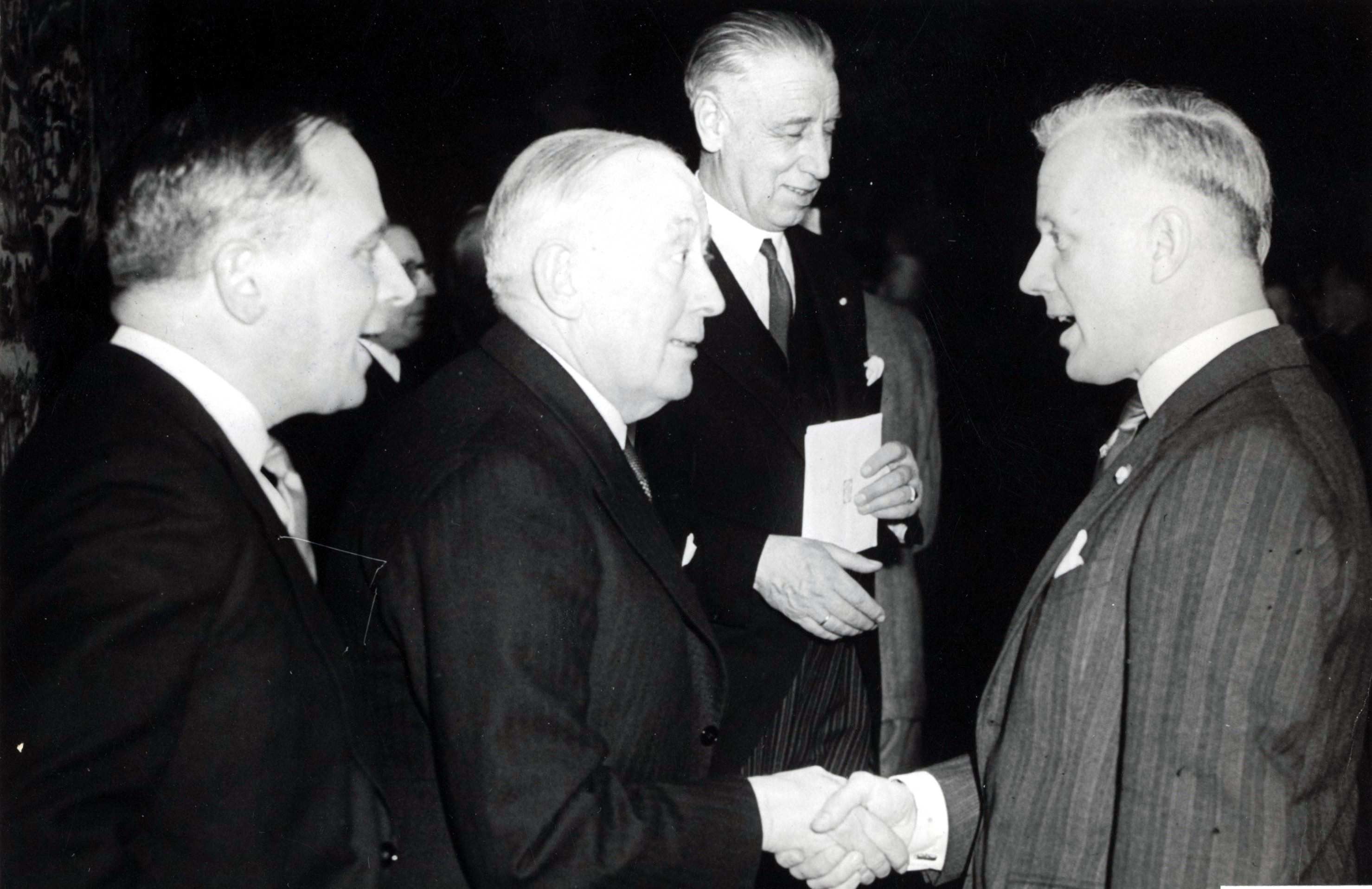
Bierens de Haan (centre, 1951)

Johan(nes) Abraham Bierens de Haan (March 17, 1883 – June 13, 1958) was a Dutch biologist and ethologist. He was a founder of the study of animal psychology.

He was born in Haarlem, and died in Siena, Italy.
