= Masindi =

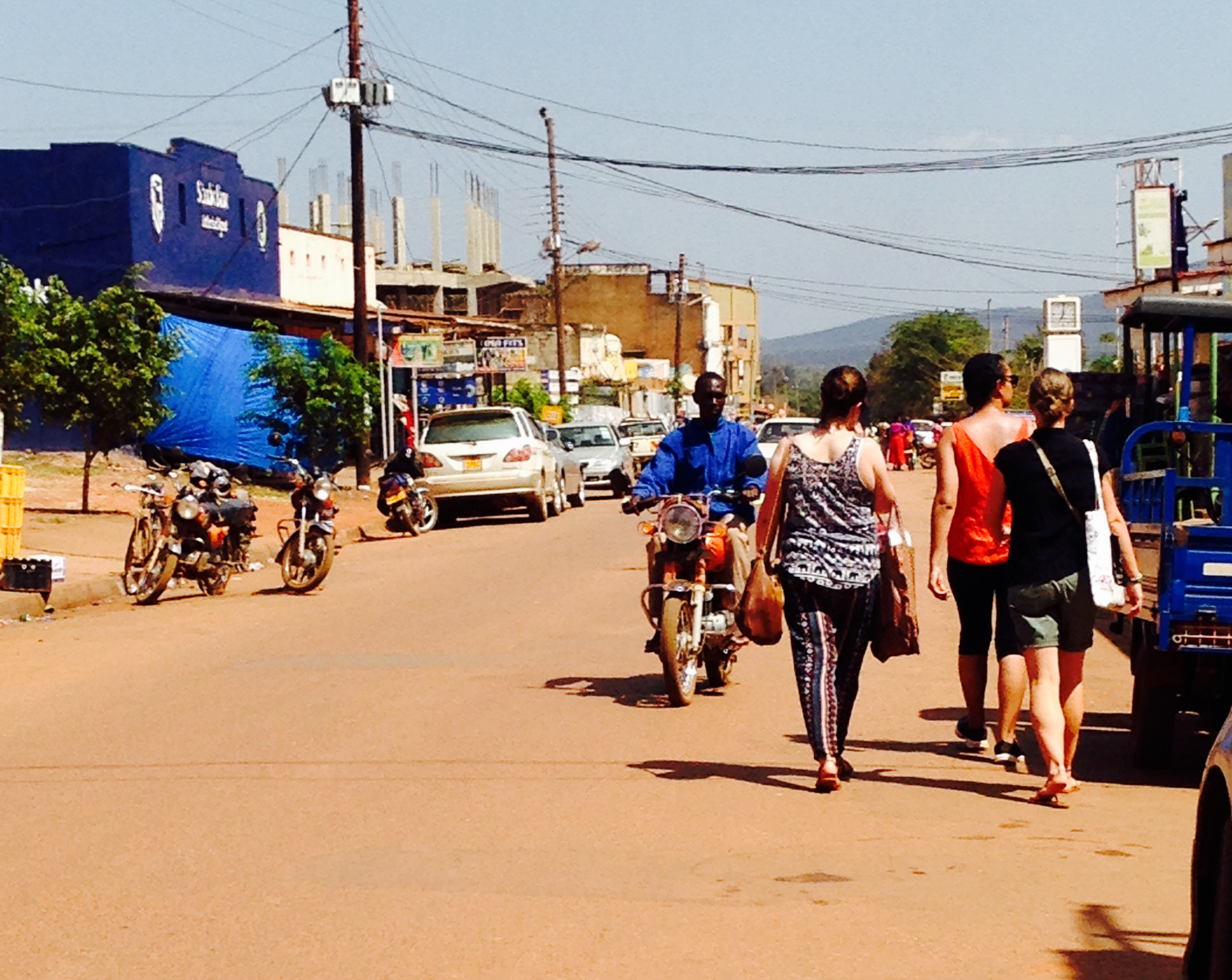

- Location in Uganda
- Coordinates: 01°41′01″N 31°43′20″E
- Country: Uganda
- Region: Western Region of Uganda
- Sub-region: Bunyoro sub-region
- District: Masindi District

Area
  - Total: 140 sq mi (360 km^{2})
- Elevation: 4,026 ft (1,227 m)

Population (2024 Census)
  - Total: 97,781

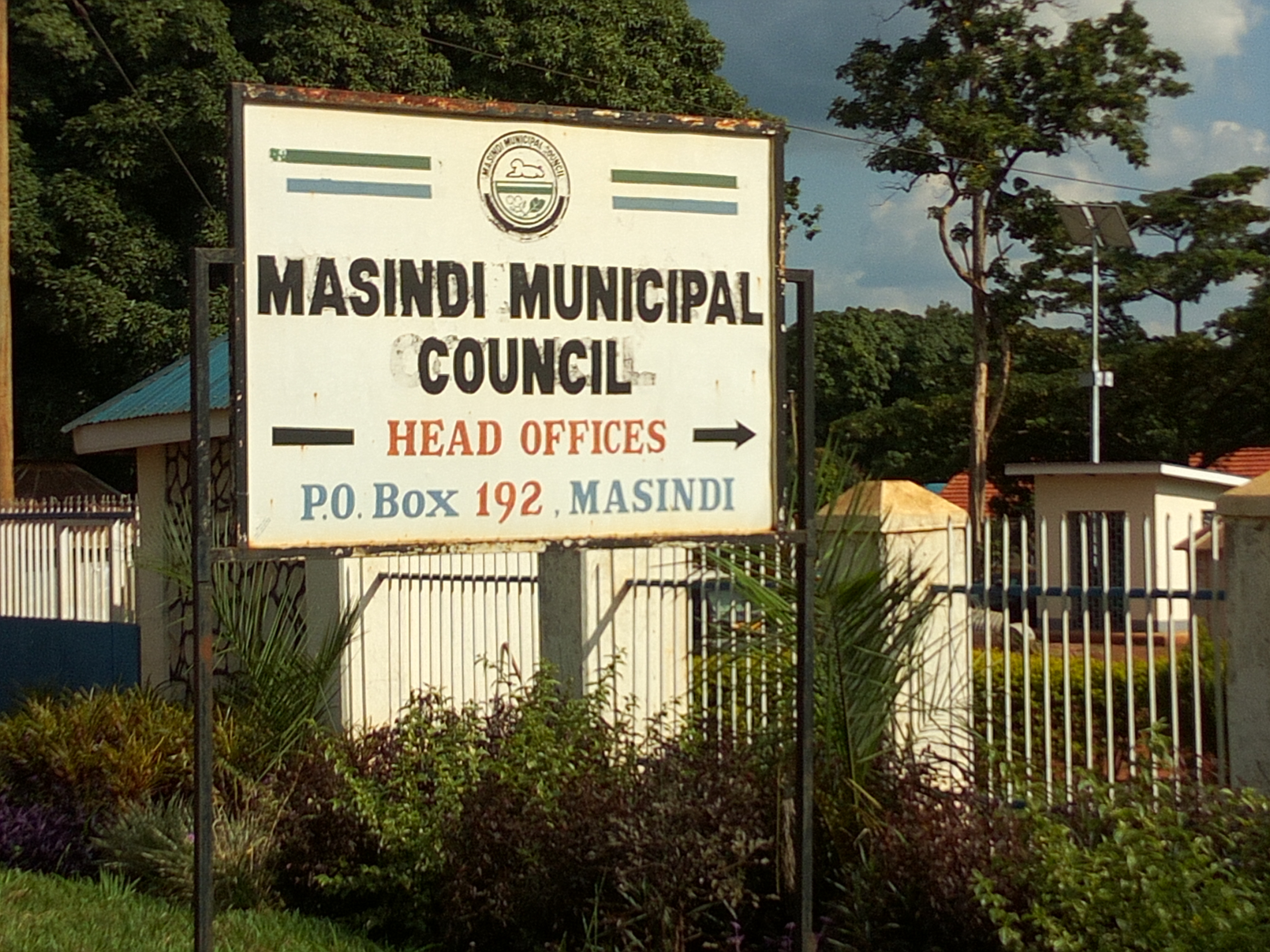
Sign post for Masindi Municipal Council

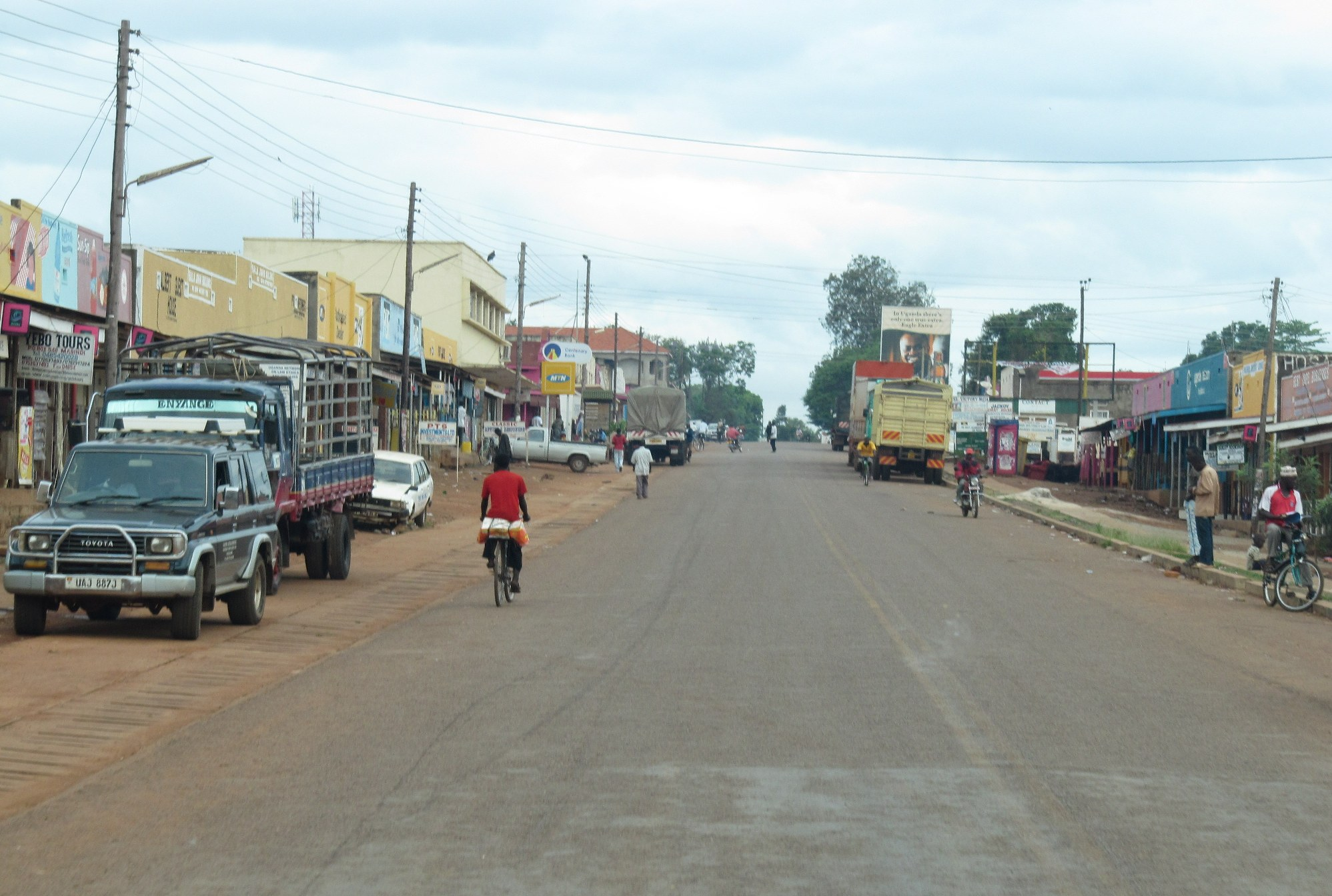
Masindi street

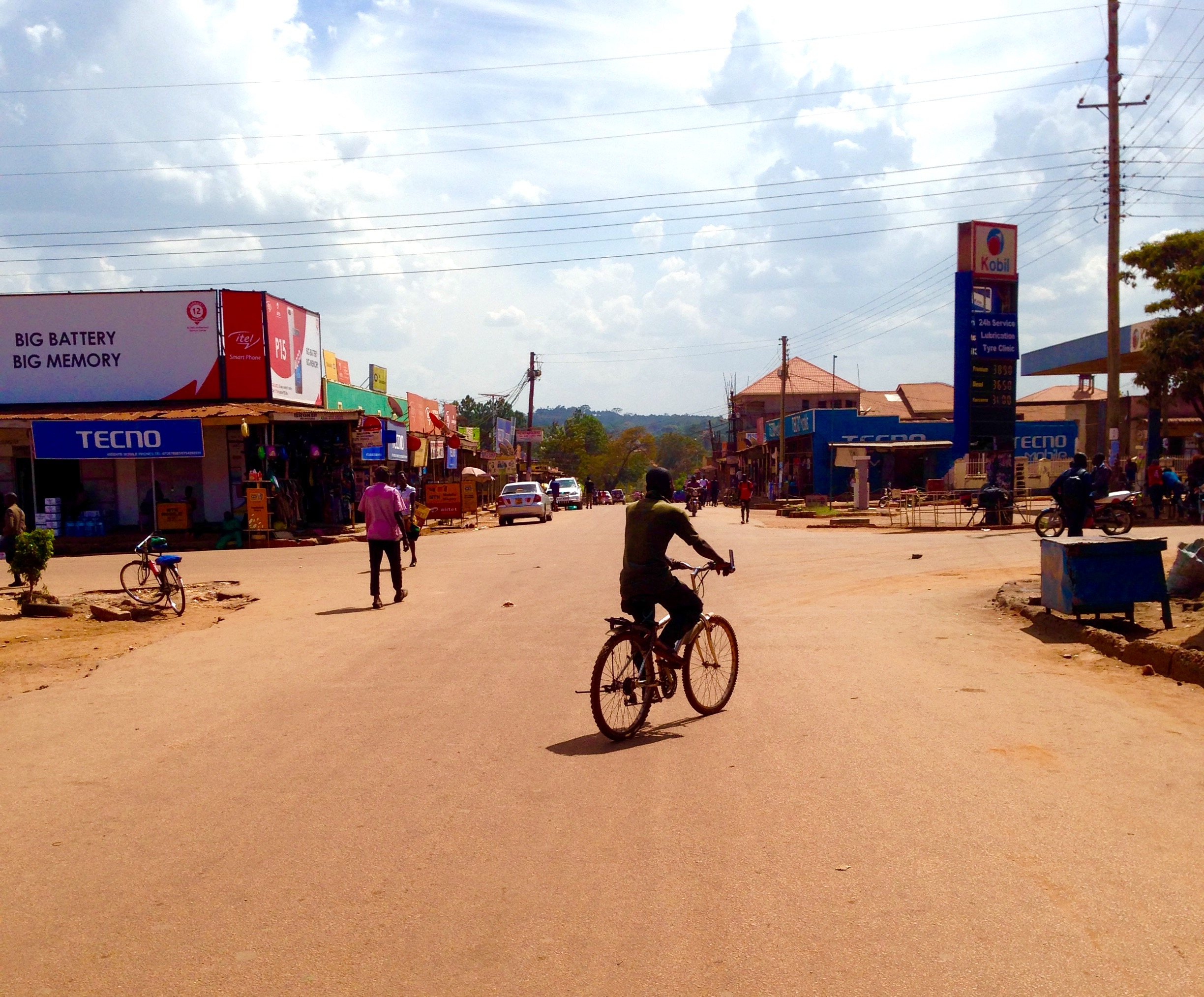
Masindi town

Masindi is a town in the Western Region of Uganda. It is on the road between Kampala and the Murchison Falls National Park. It is the site of the headquarters of the Masindi District.

== Location ==
Masindi is approximately 211 kilometres (131 mi) northwest of Kampala, Uganda's capital and largest city, on an all-weather tarmac highway. This location is approximately 57 kilometres (35 mi) north-east of Hoima, the largest city in the Bunyoro sub-region.

The coordinates of Masindi are 1°41'01.0"N, 31°43'20.0"E (Latitude:1.683611; Longitude:31.722222). Masindi Town lies at an average elevation of1,227 metres (4,026 ft) above sea level.

== Population ==
According to the 2002 national census, the population of Masindi was about 28,300. In 2010, the Uganda Bureau of Statistics (UBOS) estimated the population at 43,000. In 2011, UBOS estimated the mid-year population at 45,400. The national population census conducted in August 2014 put the population at 94,622.

In 2020, UBOS estimated the mid-year population of Masindi Town at 110,000 people. The population agency calculated that the population of the town grew at an average rate of 2.72 percent annually, between 2014 and 2020.

Historical population
Year	Pop.	±%
1969	5,226	—
1980	4,958	−5.1%
1991	10,839	+118.6%
2002	63,583	+486.6%
2014	94,438	+48.5%
2020	110,500	+17.0%

== History ==
As capital of Bunyoro, Masindi was visited by Samuel and Florence Baker, British explorers and anti-slavery campaigners, from 25 April 1872 to 14 June 1873. The Baker expedition was forced to withdraw because of the hostility of the Omukama Kabaléga, the King of Bunyoro at the time. The White Fathers founded here a mission in the 1910s. The town was developed as a commercial centre due to trade in cotton during the second half of the 19th century.

During World War II, Masindi was the location of the second-largest refugee camp for Poles escaping from Soviet-occupied Poland in East Africa. There were 3,635 people, including 1,759 children. There was a Polish preschool, three primary schools, a general education liceum and a vocational school for girls. Two Polish newspapers were issued in Masindi, Czuj Duch and Brzask.

== Climate ==
Climate data for Masindi (1961–1990)
Month	Jan	Feb	Mar	Apr	May	Jun	Jul	Aug	Sep	Oct	Nov	Dec	Year
Mean daily maximum °C (°F)	29.8 (85.6)	29.8 (85.6)	29.5 (85.1)	27.8 (82.0)	27.4 (81.3)	26.8 (80.2)	26.2 (79.2)	26.0 (78.8)	26.9 (80.4)	27.3 (81.1)	27.2 (81.0)	28.2 (82.8)	27.7 (81.9)
Mean daily minimum °C (°F)	16.7 (62.1)	17.3 (63.1)	17.8 (64.0)	17.7 (63.9)	17.3 (63.1)	16.9 (62.4)	16.4 (61.5)	16.3 (61.3)	16.1 (61.0)	16.5 (61.7)	16.5 (61.7)	16.3 (61.3)	16.8 (62.3)
Average rainfall mm (inches)	33.6 (1.32)	43.8 (1.72)	113.6 (4.47)	165.1 (6.50)	145.6 (5.73)	80.4 (3.17)	106.5 (4.19)	149.1 (5.87)	151.5 (5.96)	168.8 (6.65)	130.7 (5.15)	56.6 (2.23)	1,345.3 (52.96)
Average rainy days (≥ 1.0 mm)	4.0	5.4	10.5	13.6	12.0	8.3	9.8	12.4	13.6	15.1	11.8	5.9	122.4
Source: World Meteorological Organization

== Points of interest ==
These additional points of interest are within the town limits or close to the edges of town: (a) offices of Masindi Town Council (b) Masindi Hospital, a 200-bed public hospital administered by the Uganda Ministry of Health (c) Masindi Hotel, the oldest hotel in the country, built in 1923 and where Ernest Hemingway, Katharine Hepburn and Humphrey Bogart stayed (d) a branch of the National Social Security Fund (e) the main campus of the Kigumba Petroleum Institute, 44 kilometres (27 mi) northeast of Masindi (f) Kinyara Sugar Works, one of the three major manufacturers of refined sugar in Uganda, located 15 kilometres (9 mi) west of Masindi (g) Masindi Airport, a public airport, administered by the Civil Aviation Authority of Uganda.

== Challenges ==
A profile of the town written by the New Vision newspaper identified three major challenges. The first challenge was the inadequacy of income-generating projects outside of the town centre. Three out of four divisions in town; Kigulya, Karujubu and Nyagahya are unable to generate enough revenue to meet service demands. The second major challenge is the inadequacy of sanitation services. The town had five public toilets, as of November 2013, and all of them were located in the town's Central division. Masindi is serviced by National Water and Sewerage Corporation, but the services are concentrated in the town centre. The third major challenge for the town of Masindi is that of garbage disposal. The town lacked adequate funding to hire staff and purchase fuel to dispose of the town's garbage. However, the Central government had provided equipment to carry out the task.

== Education ==
The District Council equally joins the Government to promote Education for all its citizens in partnership with parents and others members of the community. As such, the Government's Education policy is to promote quality basic education by improving access by girls and boys, equity and retention in all Primary schools and other levels of learning.

== See also ==
- Bunyoro
- Bunyoro sub-region
- Murchison Falls
- Orunyege-Ntogoro
- List of cities and towns in Uganda
