= Masindi District =

- District
- District location in Uganda
- Coordinates: 01°41′N 31°44′E
- Country: Uganda
- Region: Western Uganda
- Sub-region: Bunyoro sub-region
- Capital: Masindi

Area
  - Land: 2,584.6 km^{2} (997.9 sq mi)

Population (2012 Estimate)
  - Total: 352,400
  - Density: 136.3/km^{2} (353/sq mi)
- Time zone: UTC+3 (EAT)
- Website: www.masindi.go.ug

Masindi District is a district in Western Uganda. Like many other Ugandan districts, it is named after its 'chief town' of Masindi, the location of the district headquarters.

== Location ==
Masindi District is bordered by Nwoya District to the north, Kiryandongo District to the east, Nakasongola District and Nakaseke District to the southeast, Kyankwanzi District to the south, Hoima District to the southwest and Bulisa District to the northwest. Masindi, the 'chief town' of the district is located approximately 220 kilometres (140 mi) west of Uganda's capital Kampala. The coordinates of the district are: 01 41N, 31 44E.

Masindi District has over three county with eighteen sub county and Town council as listed below.

=== Bujenje County ===
- Bikonzi
- Budongo
- Bulima Town Council
- Bwijanga
- Kabango Town Council
- Nyantonzi

=== Buruli County ===
- Kijunubwa
- Kijunubwa Town Council
- Kimengo
- Kiruli
- Kyatiri Town Council
- Labongo
- Miirya
- Pakanyi

=== Masindi Municipality ===
- Central Division
- Karujubu Division
- Kigulya Division
- Nyangahya Division

== Overview ==
Masindi District comprises a total area of 9,326 square kilometres (3,601 mi^{2}), of which 8,087 square kilometres (3,122 mi^{2}) (86.7%) is land, 2,843 square kilometres (1,098 mi^{2}) (30.5%) national wild reserve area, 1,031 square kilometres (398 mi^{2}) (11.1%) is national forest reserve and 799.6 square kilometres (308.7 mi^{2}) is open water. Approximately 196.3 square kilometres (75.8 mi^{2}) (2.1%) of the district are permanent wetlands.

== Population ==
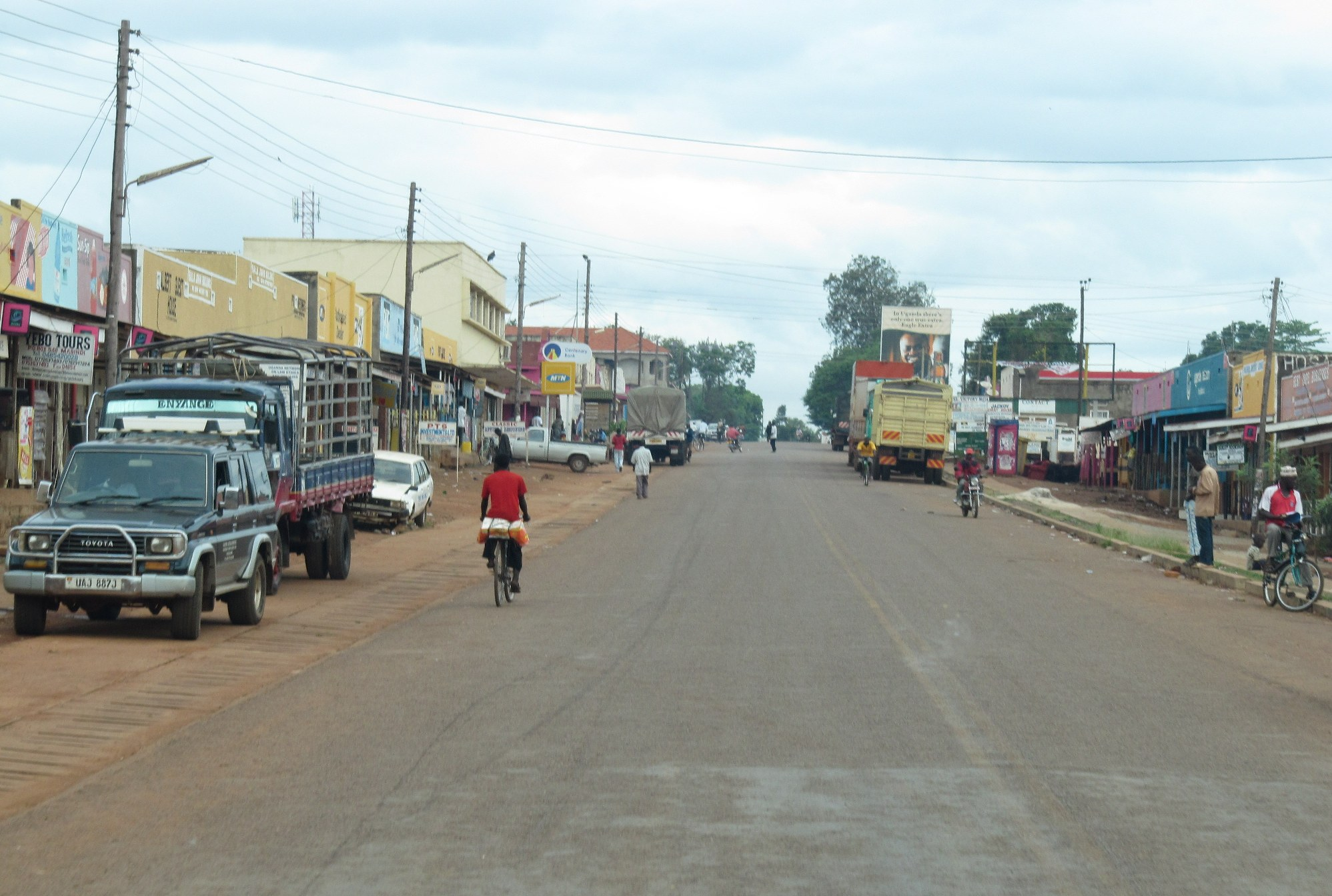
Masindi street

The region of the country in which the district is located is comparatively dry, but is fertile enough to support a predominantly agriculturalist population. Most of the district residents are both poor and rural. The district, as configured currently, had population of about 129,700 during the 1991 national population census. Eleven years later, during the national census of 2002, the population had increased to about 208,420. At that time, 50.1% of the population were males and 49.9% were females. The annual population growth rate in the district at that time was 5.1%. During 2012, the mid-year population of the district was estimated at approximately 352,400. population of Masindi district was estimated 291,113 in 2014 and 342,635 in the year of 2024.

Masindi District has a diverse ethnic composition of 55 tribes, with the dominant tribes, the Banyoro and the Bagungu, forming about 59.9% of the population. The Alur, the Jonam and the Aringa form 5.3%. The Baruli form 4.5%. People from Rwanda, Kenya, South Sudan and the Democratic Republic of the Congo have also settled permanently in the district. The average household size is about 4.86 persons, lower than the regional average of 5.2. The population is predominantly rural, with only 5.43% of the residents living in urban areas.

== Economic activities ==
Agriculture is the main economic activity in the district. Crops grown include:

- Millet
- Sorghum
- Sunflower
- Simsim
- Sweet potatoes
- Irish potatoes
- Cassava
- Maize
- Cotton
- Coffee
- Tobacco
- Cabbage
- Tomatoes
- Onions
- Soybeans
- Peas
- Bananas

Fishing is practiced in the rivers and on Lake Albert. Fish farming is an important economic activity with over 250 ponds in the district. Bee keeping for honey production is an increasing practice in the district. Tourism is also increasing with a steady stream of visitors to Murchison Falls National Park.

73.1% of the population in the district are engaged in smallholder agricultural activities. About 6.2% of the total farmland is under large scale commercial farming. The district is the leading producer of maize in the region. In Uganda, only Iganga District and Kapchorwa District produce more maize than Masindi District.

== Points of interest ==
The following points of interest are found in Masindi District:

- Murchison Falls National Park - More than 50% of the park is located in Masindi District, south of the Victoria Nile
- Murchison Falls - On the Victoria Nile, are also located in Masindi District, inside the national park.
- * Budongo Forest Reserve - About 40 kilometres (25 mi), by road, west of Masindi on the Masindi-Butiaba Road
- Omukama's Palace - One of the palaces of the Omukama of Bunyoro

== See also ==
- Masindi
- Bunyoro Kingdom
- Bunyoro sub-region
- Murchison Falls National Park
- Murchison Falls
- Western Region, Uganda
- Parliament of Uganda
- Districts of Uganda
