= National Forestry Authority =

Ugandan government agency that manages forests

National Forest Authority
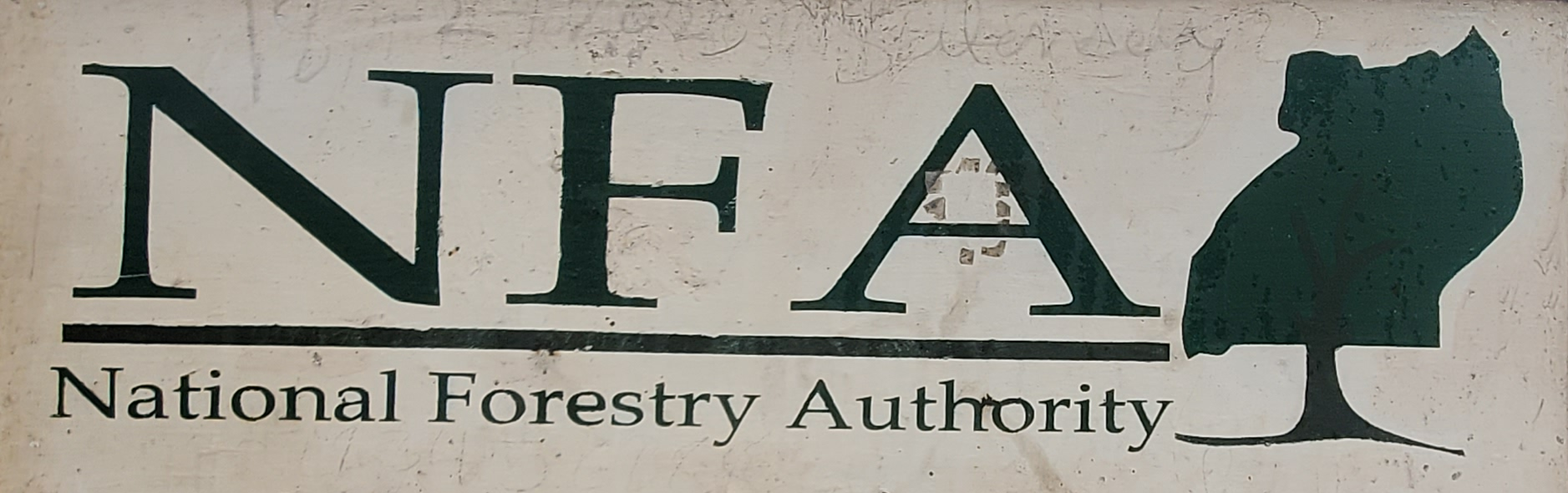

Agency overview
- Formed: 2003
- Jurisdiction: Government of Uganda
- Headquarters: Plot 10/20, Spring Road, Kampala, Uganda
- Agency executive: Executive director
- Parent agency: Ministry of Water and Environment (Uganda)
- Website: nfa.org.ug

The National Forestry Authority (NFA) is the body of the Ugandan central government that is responsible for managing the country's Central Forest Reserves through demarcating, re-surveying and maintaining them. It was created as a semi-autonomous corporation through the National Forestry and Tree Planting Act of 2003 to replace the prior Forestry Department.

== Overview ==
The National Forestry Authority was established by the Act of Parliament in 2003 to replace the century-old Forest Department which as a purely government department had failed to address the challenges that the forestry sector was facing in the 1970s through to the 1990s. The mandate of the National Forestry Authority is to manage Central Forest Reserves on a sustainable basis and to supply other high quality forestry-related products and services in accordance with sound financial and commercial practice.

== Roles ==
- To manage the country's Central Forest Reserves through boundaries demarcations, re-surveying and maintaining them.
- Consent and approve all the constructions through the forest reserves through the EIA permit issued to UNRA by NEMA.
- License commercial activity in central forest reserves.

== See also ==
- Management and conservation of wetlands in Uganda
- Tourism in Uganda
- Uganda Forestry Working Group
