= Mirama–Kabale High Voltage Power Line =

Ugandan high voltage electricity transmission line

Mirama–Kabale High Voltage Power Line Line

Location
- Country: Uganda
- Coordinates: 01°02′59″S 30°27′29″E
- General direction: East to West
- From: Mirama Hills, Uganda
- Passes through: Rushenyi
- To: Kabale, Uganda

Ownership information
- Owner: Government of Uganda
- Partners: Islamic Development Bank
- Operator: Uganda Electricity Transmission Company Limited

Construction information
- Construction started: December 2020
- Expected: 12 February 2024

Technical information
- Current type: AC
- Total length: 85 km (53 mi)
- AC voltage: 132kV
- No. of circuits: 2

The Mirama–Kabale High Voltage Power Line is a high voltage electricity power line, connecting the high voltage substation in the town of Mirama Hills, in the Western Region to another high voltage substation in te city of Kabale, also in the Western Region of Uganda.

== Location ==
The 132 kilo Volt power line starts at the Uganda Electricity Transmission Company Limited (UETCL) 132kV substation at Mirama Hills, in Ntungamo District, at the international border with Rwanda. From there it travels westwards to the town of Rushenyi, Ntungamo District, a road distance of approximately 47 kilometres (29 mi).

From Rushenyi, the power line takes a general southwesterly direction and travels to Kabale, in Kabale District, a distance of approximately 47.2 kilometres (29 mi), from Rushenyi. The power line does not follow the road all the time as is slightly shorter, measuring a total of 85 kilometres (53 mi).

== Overview ==
The power line was developed as part of plans to improve grid power delivery and reliability to the districts in the Kigezi sub-region and to deliver high voltage electricity to Kabale, the largest city in Kigezi. The other consideration is to evacuate power generated by Kikagati Hydroelectric Power Station (16 megawatts) and Nshungyezi Hydroelectric Power Station (39 megawatts) and transmit it to Kabale for industrial, commercial and domestic use. A loan obtained from the Islamic Development Bank (IsDB), was used in funding the construction of this power line, including 132/33kV substations at Mirama Hills and Kabale. In addition, funded by that same loan, is the construction of 531.08 kilometres (330 mi) medium voltage (33kV and 11kV) distribution lines and 584.54 kilometres (363 mi) low voltage (415V and 214V) lines. Also, a total of 377 transformers (25kVA, 50kVA, 100kVA & 200kVA) will be installed, together with 14,185 last-mile customer connections.

== Construction and funding ==
Work on this power transmission line began in 2014. In 2015, the Islamic Development Bank agreed to lend the government of Uganda US$83,750,000 to build this power line and Opuyo–Moroto High Voltage Power Line. As of June 2019, procurement of a contractor for the Mirama–Kabale Transmission Line was ongoing. In February 2026, Ugandan online media reported the total cost of the entire project was UGX340 billion (approximately US$94,282,000).

The engineering, procurement and construction (EPC) contract was awarded to a joint venture enterprise comprising (a) Colenco Consulting Nigeria Limited (b) CCC-GTSCC Consortium of Nigeria and Ceylex Engineering Private Limited of Sri Lanka. The completed transmission line was commercially brought online in December 2024 and politically commissioned in February 2025.

== See also ==
- Energy in Uganda
- List of power stations in Uganda
