= Mirama–Kikagati–Nsongezi High Voltage Power Line =

High voltage power line in Uganda

Location
- Country: Uganda
- Coordinates: 01°02′33″S 30°40′10″E
- General direction: West to East
- From: Mirama Hills, Uganda
- Passes through: Kikagati, Uganda
- To: Nshugyezi, Uganda

Ownership information
- Owner: Government of Uganda
- Operator: Uganda Electricity Transmission Company Limited

Construction information
- Construction started: 2022 Expected
- Expected: Commissioning 2023 Anticipated

Technical information
- Current type: AC
- Total length: 38 km (24 mi)
- AC voltage: 132kV
- No. of circuits: 2

The Mirama–Kikagati–Nsongezi High Voltage Power Line is a planned high voltage electricity power line, connecting the high voltage substation at Mirama Hills, in the Western Region of Uganda, to another high voltage substation at Kikagati Hydroelectric Power Station and continues to end at Nshungyezi Hydropower Station.

== Location ==
The 132-kilovolt power line starts at the Uganda Electricity Transmission Company Limited (UETCL) 132kV substation at Mirama Hills, Ntungamo District, in Uganda's Western Region. The power line travels in a general easterly direction to Kikagati Hydroelectric Power Station, in Kikagati, Isingiro District, a road distance of approximately 36 kilometres (22 mi). From there, the power line takes a general northeasterly direction to end at Nshungyezi Hydroelectric Power Station, a distance of about 13 kilometres (8 mi), as the crow flies, but is approximately 31 kilometres (19 mi) by road from Kikagati. Due to the steep terrain, the power line does not always follow the winding road. The line measures only 38 kilometres (24 mi), from Mirama Hills to Nshungyezi.

== Overview ==
The power line is being developed to evacuate the 16 megawatts of electricity generated at Kikagati Hydroelectric Power Station and the 39 megawatts generated at Nshungyezi Power Station and transmit it to Mirama Hills, for integration into Uganda's national electricity grid.

== Associated power infrastructure ==
As of August 2020, Kikagati Power Station is under construction at a contract price of US$88 million and an anticipated completion date of 2021. The project received US$12.3 million partial funding from the Uganda GET Fit Program.

Nshungyezi Power Station is a proposed 39 megawatts hydroelectric power station planned on the Kagera River, approximately 13 kilometres (8 mi), downstream of Kikagati Power Station. The development rights are owned by Maji Power Limited, a subsidiary of Berkeley Energy.

== Cost and construction ==
The power line and associated infrastructure developments are budgeted at US$33.4 million. As of August 2020, construction has not started. It was anticipated that by 2022, the power line would be in operation. Uganda Electricity Transmission Company Limited will own and operate the completed power transmission line. The project received partial funding from the government of Norway.

== See also ==
- Energy in Uganda
- List of power stations in Uganda
