= Busitema Solar Power Station =

Power plant in Uganda

- Country: Uganda
- Location: Busia District
- Coordinates: 00°32′50″N 34°01′25″E
- Status: Operational
- Construction began: 2018
- Commission date: 2022
- Construction cost: US$6.5 million
- Owner: Busitema University
- Operator: Busitema University

Solar farm
- Type: Flat-panel PV
- Site area: 7.5 hectares (19 acres)

Power generation
- Nameplate capacity: 4 megawatts (5,400 hp)

The Busitema Solar Power Station is a 4 megawatts (5,400 hp) solar power plant in Uganda.

== Location ==
The power station is located in Busia District in the Eastern Region of Uganda, on the main campus of Busitema University, a public university, approximately 183 kilometres (114 mi), by road, east of Kampala, the largest city and capital of Uganda.

== Overview ==
This solar station is a donation from the government of Egypt to the government of Uganda. This followed the signing of bilateral agreements between the two countries in 2016. This was then followed by the signing of a memorandum of understanding between Abdel Fattah el-Sisi, the president of Egypt, and Yoweri Museveni, the president of Uganda, in May 2018. The power station is intended to increase Uganda's renewable energy pool, increase the supply of power to the Eastern Region, and serve as a teaching tool to university students studying renewable energy programs.

This power station was the fifth solar power station connected to the Ugandan national electricity power grid, after the Soroti Solar Power Station, which came online in December 2015, the Tororo Solar Power Station, which was commissioned in October 2017, and the Kabulasoke Solar Power Station, which was commissioned in December 2018. Mayuge Solar Power Station with capacity of 10 megawatts came online in June 2019.

== Developers ==
The solar power plant was developed by engineers from the Egyptian Ministry of Electric & Renewable Energy Authority. The senior engineer is Mohammed A. Abdel Aziz and the project manager is engineer Reda Shaban Ali. An Egyptian team, led by the two, performed an advance inspection and approved the site of the plant.

The parties agreed for Egypt to provide the necessary equipment and engineering services while Uganda provides the 7.5 hectares (19 acres) real estate where the plant is built. In addition, Uganda catered for the ground transportation and taxation of the donated equipment, from the port of Mombasa, Kenya to the project location in Uganda.

== Commissioning ==
The completed power station was commissioned by the Energy Minister at that time, Ruth Nankabirwa and the First Deputy Prime Minister and Minister for the East African Community, Rebecca Kadaga, on 25 January 2022.

== See also ==
- List of power stations in Uganda
- Electricity Regulatory Authority
