= Namugoga Solar Power Station =

Solar farm in Uganda

- Country: Uganda
- Location: Namugoga, Wakiso District
- Coordinates: 00°10′21″N 32°34′05″E
- Status: In development
- Construction began: 2018 (Expected)
- Commission date: 2022 (Expected)
- Owners: Solar Energy for Africa; Naanovo Energy Inc.

Solar farm
- Type: Flat-panel PV

Power generation
- Nameplate capacity: 50 MW

Namugoga Solar Power Station is a 50 megawatt solar power plant, under development in Uganda.

As of April 2021 the solar farm is under construction and may be finished later in the year.

== Location ==
The power station is in Namugoga Village, Busiro County, Wakiso District, in the Central Region of Uganda. This location is near the township of Kajjansi, along the Kajjansi-Lutembe Road, off the Kampala-Entebbe Road, approximately 19 kilometres (12 mi) by road, south of the centre of Kampala, the country's capital and largest city.

== Overview ==
When completed, the power station will have an installed capacity of 50 megawatts, to be sold directly to the Uganda Electricity Transmission Company Limited, the sole authorized purchaser. The electricity will be evacuated from the station to a substation in Kisubi for integration into the national electricity grid, via a new 33kV high voltage transmission line.

== Developers ==
A consortium comprising two companies, one local and one international, were granted the confession to design, develop, own, operate and maintain the power station: (a) Solar Power for Africa, a Ugandan solar power equipment vendor (b) Naanovo Energy Inc., a Canadian alternative energy developer. According to a 2010 published report, the development has been delayed because the developers have offered to generate power at US 15 cents per kilowatt-hour while less costly hydropower plants generate at only US 7 cents per kilowatt-hour.

== See also ==
- List of power stations in Uganda
- Electricity Regulatory Authority
- Tororo Thermal Power Station
- Soroti Solar Power Station
