= Mayuge Solar Power Station =

Ugandan power station

- Country: Uganda
- Location: Bufulubi Village, Mayuge District
- Coordinates: 00°29′23″N 33°25′39″E
- Status: Operational
- Construction began: 2018
- Commission date: 6 June 2019
- Owner: Tryba Energy
- Operator: Tryba Energy

Solar farm
- Type: Flat-panel PV

Power generation
- Nameplate capacity: 10 MW (13,000 hp)

Mayuge Solar Power Station, also Bufulubi Solar Power Station, is an operational 10 MW (13,000 hp) solar power plant in Uganda.

== Location ==
The power plant is located on 40.4 hectares (100 acres) of leased land in Bufulubi Village, Imanyiro sub-county, Mayuge District, in the Eastern Region of Uganda.

Bufulubi Solar Power Plant is located approximately 110 kilometres (68 mi) by road east of Kampala, the country's capital and largest city.

== Overview ==
Emerging Power Uganda Limited, a renewable energy developer, has secured a 25-year lease on 100 acres (40 ha) of land from the Busoga Kyabazingaship for the purpose of building a solar farm. Application has been made to the Electricity Regulatory Authority (ERA) to set up the plant and sell the power to Uganda Electricity Transmission Company Limited for integration into the national electric grid.

The power station comprises 30,600 sun-tracking pv panels, which track the sun to maximize power output. The power generated is enough to supply 30,000 homes.

== Developers and funding ==
Metka EGN, the Greek construction conglomerate, was the engineering, procurement and construction (EPC) contractor. The construction, which cost US$11 million (USh41 billion), was funded by Tryba Energy, a French family industrial group dedicated to solar energy. Tryba Energy has secured a 20-year lease of 100 acres of land from the Busoga Kingdom, while an application was made to the Electricity Regulatory Authority (ERA) to set up the plant and sell the power to Uganda Electricity Transmission Company Limited (UETCL) for integration into the national grid.

== Timeline ==
The completed power station was commissioned on Thursday, 6 June 2019. At that time, Uganda' grid had a total contribution of 50 megawatts, from solar plants, including Soroti Solar Power Station (10 megawatts), Tororo Solar Power Station (10 megawatts) and Kabulasoke Solar Power Station (20 megawatts).

== Other considerations ==
The energy generated here is sold to the Uganda Electricity Transmission Company Limited (UETCL), for integration into the national grid. UETCL pays US$0.11 for every kilo Watthour of energy, under a long-term power purchase agreement.

== See also ==
- List of power stations in Uganda
- Energy in Uganda
