= Nyamwamba Hydroelectric Power Station =

Nyamwamba Hydroelectric Power Station may refer to:

- Nyamwamba I Hydroelectric Power Station, a 9.2 megawatts mini-hydro in Western Uganda, owned and operated by Serengeti Energy Limited
- Nyamwamba II Hydroelectric Power Station, a 7.8 megawatts mini-hydro in Western Uganda, across the same river, also owned and operated by Serengeti Energy Limited.
