= Opuyo–Moroto High Voltage Power Line =

Location
- Country: Uganda
- Coordinates: 1.677500°N 33.676944°E
- General direction: South to North
- From: Opuyo, Uganda
- Passes through: Katakwi, Napak
- To: Moroto Town, Uganda

Ownership information
- Owner: Government of Uganda
- Partners: Islamic Development Bank
- Operator: Uganda Electricity Transmission Company Limited

Construction information
- Contractors: Nanjing Paji Steel Power Manufacturing Company Limited of China
- Construction started: 2017
- Commissioned: June 2021

Technical information
- Current type: AC
- Total length: 160 km (99 mi)
- AC voltage: 132kV
- No. of circuits: 2

The Opuyo–Moroto High Voltage Power Line is a high voltage electricity power line, connecting the high voltage substation at Opuyo, a southern suburb of the city of Soroti, in the Eastern Region to another high voltage substation at Moroto, in the Northern Region of Uganda. The power line was energized in June 2021.

== Location ==
The 132 kilo Volt power line starts at the Uganda Electricity Transmission Company Limited (UETCL) 132kV substation at Opuyo, Soroti District, in Uganda's Eastern Region, approximately 7 kilometres (4 mi), by road, south-east of Soroti, the largest urban center in the Teso sub-region. The power line travels in a general north-easterly direction to end at another 132kV substation, also owned by UETCL, located at Moroto City, in Moroto District, a total distance of about 160 kilometres (99 mi). The road distance between Opuyo and Moroto is about 176 kilometres (109 mi), but the power line is a little shorter, because it does not always follow the road.

== Overview ==
The power line was developed as part of plans to improve grid power delivery and reliability to the districts that constitute the Karamoja sub-region. Using US$80 million, borrowed from the Islamic Development Bank, the government of Uganda funded the construction of this power line, including a new substation at Moroto. Grid electricity was introduced in Karamoja in 2013, but distribution remains sparse.

== Associated power lines ==
Each of the five districts in the Karamoja sub-region is expected to receive a feeder line off this power line, to bring grid electricity closer to the people who need it.

== Project Engineering and work supervision ==
Supervision of works contract was awarded to Ghods Niroo Engineering Company .

== Construction ==
Nanjing Daji Steel Tower Manufacturing Company Limited of China, is the main contractor on this project. Construction began in July 2017 and was concluded in 2021, with commercial commissioning in June 2021.

== See also ==
- Energy in Uganda
- List of power stations in Uganda
