= Sindila Hydroelectric Power Station =

Power station in Uganda

- Country: Uganda
- Location: Sindila, Bundibugyo District
- Coordinates: 00°37′48″N 29°58′41″E
- Status: Operational
- Construction began: February 2017
- Commission date: February 2019
- Construction cost: US$17 million
- Owner: Sindila Power Company Uganda Limited

Power generation
- Nameplate capacity: 5.25 MW (7,040 hp)
- Annual net output: 28GWh

Sindila Hydroelectric Power Station, also called Sindila Power Station, is an operational 5.25 MW (7,040 hp) mini-hydropower station in the Western Region of Uganda.

== Location ==
The power station is located across the Sindila River, just outside Rwenzori National Park, in Bundibugyo District, in Uganda's Western Region. This is about 20 kilometres (12 mi), by road, southwest of the town of Bundibugyo, the nearest urban center and the location of the district headquarters. This location is in close proximity of the 6.4 megawatts (8,583 hp) Ndugutu Hydroelectric Power Station, which is owned by the same developer.

== Overview ==
Sindila HEPS is a run-of-river mini-hydro power plant whose planned maximum installed capacity is 5.9MW. The project is owned by a consortium of investors as depicted in the ownership table below. The consortium that owns and is developing Sindila Power Station, also owns the nearby Ndugutu Hydroelectric Power Station.

== Ownership ==
The special company vehicle known as Sindila Power Company Uganda Limited is owned by the following corporate entities:

Sindila Power Company Uganda Limited stock ownership
Rank	Name of Owner	Percentage ownership
1	Lereko Metier Sustainable Capital (LMSC) of South Africa	87.0
2	KMRI LLC of the United States	
3	WK Power of South Africa	
4	Fieldstone Africa Investment Resources (FAIR)	
	Total	100.00

== Timeline ==
Sindila Power Station received approval for GetFit support in October 2014. Financial close was reached on 30 January 2017. Construction started in February 2017 and was completed in October 2019.

== Funding ==
Construction is expected to cost US$17 million, with US$3.3 million in GetFit subsidies. Funding for reinforcement of the 33kV high-voltage evacuation line, that measures 87 kilometres (54 mi) is included in the GetFit package. The power generated, together with that from the nearby Ndugutu Power Station, will be evacuated to Fort Portal and sold to Uganda Electricity Transmission Company Limited, under a renewable twenty-year power sales agreement.

== See also ==
- Buranga Geothermal Power Station
- List of power stations in Uganda
