= Ituka Solar Power Station =

Solar farm in Uganda

- Country: Uganda
- Location: Ombaci Village, Uleppi Sub-county, Okollo District
- Coordinates: 02°46′20″N 31°02′20″E
- Status: Under construction
- Construction began: August 2024
- Commission date: Q3 2025 Expected
- Construction cost: US$19+ million
- Owner: Amea Solar Power
- Operator: Ituka West Nile Uganda Limited

Solar farm
- Type: Flat-panel PV

Power generation
- Nameplate capacity: 24 megawatts (32,000 hp)
- Annual net output: 53.94 GWh

The Ituka Solar Power Station, is a 24 megawatts (32,000 hp) solar power plant under construction in Uganda. The power station is under development by AMEA Power, an independent power producer (IPP), domiciled in the United Arab Emirates.

== Location ==
The power station is located in Ombaci Village, Uleppi Subcounty, Madi Okollo District, approximately 40 kilometres (25 mi), by road, southeast of Arua city center.

== Overview ==
The construction site measures 52 hectares (130 acres). The design calls for a ground-mounted photo-voltaic solar power station with generation capacity of 24 megawatts. The power will be sold directly to the Uganda Electricity Transmission Company Limited (UETCL) for integration in the national electricity grid. A 20-year power purchase agreement (PPA) has been signed between the developers and UETCL to guide the sale and purchase of electricity between the two. Construction started in August 2024 and commercial commissioning is anticipated in 2025.

Included in the project is the construction of a medium voltage 33/132 kV transformer switchyard, through which the power generated here will be directed to the 132 kV Lira–Gulu–Nebbi–Arua High Voltage Power Line, for evacuation.

== Developers ==
The power station is owned by AMEA Power, a renewable energy IPP with focus on Africa, Asia and the Middle East. Amea Power created a subsidiary that it owns 100 percent called Ituka West Nile Uganda Limited, a special purpose vehicle company specifically set up to develop, build, operate and maintain this solar power station.

== Costs and funding ==
The cost of construction has not been disclosed as of December 2023. The Emerging Africa Infrastructure Fund (EAIF), a subsidiary of the Private Infrastructure Development Group (PIDG) has committed to lend US$19 million towards the development of this power station. The PIGD is funded by donor countries: United Kingdom, Switzerland, Australia, Norway, Sweden, Netherlands, Germany and the World Bank Group.

In December 2023, the African Trade and Investment Development Insurance (ATIDI), announced its intention to support this development through its Regional Liquidity Support Facility (RLSF). ATIDI will provide payment guarantees for the benefit of the project on behalf of UETCL. The insurance policy will cover up to six months' worth of revenue for the IPP and be in place for an initial duration of 15 years. The insurance policy makes the investment project more bankable and more secure.

== See also ==
- List of power stations in Uganda
- Soroti Solar Power Station
- Tororo Solar Power Station
