= Lira–Gulu–Nebbi–Arua High Voltage Power Line =

Power line in Uganda

Location
- Country: Uganda
- Coordinates: 02°44′14″N 32°18′18″E
- General direction: East to West
- From: Lira, Uganda
- Passes through: Gulu, Pakwach, Nebbi
- To: Arua, Uganda

Ownership information
- Owner: Government of Uganda
- Operator: Uganda Electricity Transmission Company Limited

Construction information
- Contractors: KEC International & AVIC International Holding Corporation
- Construction started: 2020
- Expected: 2024

Technical information
- Current type: AC
- Total length: 183 mi (295 km)
- AC voltage: 132kV
- No. of circuits: 2

The Lira–Gulu–Nebbi–Arua High Voltage Power Line is an operational high voltage electricity power line in Uganda. It connects the high voltage substation at Lira, in Lira District, to another high voltage substation at Arua, in Arua District, all in the Northern Region of the country.

== Location ==
The 132 kilo Volt power line starts at the 132kV substation at Lira, approximately 337 kilometres (209 mi), by road, north of Kampala, Uganda's capital and largest city. The power line travels in a general northwesterly direction to Gulu, the largest city in Northern Uganda, a distance of approximately 110 kilometres (68 mi), by road from Lira.

From Gulu, the power line continues in a general southwesterly direction to Nebbi, in Nebbi District, approximately 173 kilometres (107 mi) away, by road. From Nebbi, the power line turns northwest and runs another 80 kilometres (50 mi), to end in the city of Arua. The power line which does not track the roads all the time has a total length of about 294 kilometres (183 mi).

== Overview ==
This power line is intended to transmit electricity in an improved, sustainable manner to Uganda's Northern Region and extend the national electric grid to the West Nile sub-region. This is in line with government of Uganda's Vision 2040 to achieve middle income status by 2040.

== Associated substations ==
The work includes the construction of 132kV substations at Gulu, Nebbi and Arua, and the expansion of the existing 132kV substation at Lira. If the Lira substation cannot be expanded for technical reasons, a brand new second 132kV substation will be built at Lira.

== Construction ==
The government of Uganda obtained financing in the amount of US$100 million, from the International Development Association to fund the construction of this energy project. The government contributed US$27.3 million to project costs. As of 5 May 2016, the feasibility studies, population resettlement plans and the acquisition of a procurement consultant had been completed. Work on soliciting of a contractor began in September 2016, with completion expected in 2022.

In July 2020, the construction contract was awarded to KEC International Limited of India and a joint venture company comprising AVIC International Holding Corporation and Central Southern China Electric Power Design Institute Company Limited. Construction was expected to last two years and conclude in the second half of 2022.

== Developments ==
In August 2024, Uganda Electricity Transmission Company Limited energized the Nebbi substation on this line, thereby connecting the West Nile sub-region to Uganda's national grid.

== See also ==
- Energy in Uganda
- List of power stations in Uganda
