= Nyamwamba II Hydroelectric Power Station =

Power station in Uganda

- Map of Uganda showing the location of Nyamwamba II Power Station
- Country: Uganda
- Location: Kilembe, Kasese District
- Coordinates: 00°13′56″N 29°58′51″E
- Status: Operational
- Construction began: October 2019
- Opening date: March 2022
- Construction cost: US$22 million
- Owner: Serengeti Energy

Dam and spillways
- Type of dam: Run of river
- Impounds: Nyamwamba River

Reservoir
- Normal elevation: 1,680 m (5,510 ft)

Power Station
- Operator: Serengeti Energy Limited
- Type: Run-of-the-river
- Turbines: 2
- Installed capacity: 7.8 MW (10,500 hp)

Nyamwamba II Hydroelectric Power Station, is a 7.8 megawatts mini-hydroelectric power station, that was commercially commissioned in March 2022 in Uganda. The run of river mini-hydroelectric installation is owned and was developed, between October 2019 and March 2022, by Serengeti Energy Limited, a Kenyan independent power producer (IPP), which was formerly called responsAbility Renewable Energy Holding (rAREH). The energy generated here is sold directly to the Ugandan electricity transmission parastatal company, Uganda Electricity Transmission Company Limited (UETCL), under a 20-year power purchase agreement (PPA). The power is integrated into the Ugandan national electric grid.

== Location ==
The power station is located in the village of Kilembe, across the River Nyamwamba, in Kasese District in the Western Region of Uganda. This is in the foothills of the Rwenzori Mountains, close to the border with the Democratic Republic of the Congo. Nyamwamba II HPP straddles the Nyamwamba River, upstream of the 9.2 megawatts Nyamwamba I Hydroelectric Power Station, also owned an operated by Serengeti Energy Limited.

== Overview ==
The power station is a run of the river mini-hydropower installation, with installed capacity of 7.8 megawatts. The power station is owned by Serengeti Energy Limited, an IPP based in Nairobi, Kenya.

The engineering, procurement and construction (EPC) contractor for Nyamwamba II HPP was a consortium comprising South Asia Energy Management Systems LLC (SAEMS), based in Sri Lanka, who were responsible for civil works, and Andritz AG of Austria, who were responsible supplying and installing the electric generators and other electromechanical installations. Zutari Engineering, based in South Arica, was the Owner's Engineer.

== Construction costs and funding ==
The construction costs are reported to be US$22 million. The table below illustrates the sources of funding for this renewable energy project.

Financing Sources For Nyamwamba II Hydroelectric Power Station
Rank	Name of Lender	Notes
1	Emerging Africa Infrastructure Fund (EAIF)	
2	Regional Liquidity Support Facility (RLSF)	
3	African Trade Insurance Agency (ATI)	
4	Serengeti Energy Limited (SEL)	

In May 2022, Afrik21.africa reported that Emerging Africa Infrastructure Fund (EAIF), lent Serengeti Energy US$10.6 million, to be repaid over 17 years. As a result of that loan, Serengeti was able to retire the construction loans, leaving EAIF as the sole lender to the project.

== Construction timetable ==
Construction started in October 2019 and commercial commissioning was effected on 17 March 2022.

== Other considerations ==
Nyamwamba II HPP created 205 jobs during the construction phase and employs 25 people during the operational phase. It provides electricity to an estimated 161,000 Ugandan customers. The green energy it produces helps reduce carbon dioxide emissions by 18,000 tonnes annually.

== See also ==
- List of hydropower stations in Africa
- List of hydroelectric power stations
- List of power stations in Uganda
- List of power stations in Africa
