= Waki Hydroelectric Power Station =

Hydroelectric power station in Uganda

Waki Power Station
- Country: Uganda
- Location: Butiaba, Masindi District
- Coordinates: 01°45′59″N 31°21′59″E
- Status: Proposed
- Commission date: 2017 (Expected)
- Owner: Hydromax

Power generation
- Nameplate capacity: 5 MW

Waki Power Station is a proposed 5 megawatts (6,700 hp) mini hydroelectric power station in Uganda, the third-largest economy in the East African Community.

== Location ==
The power station will be located across the Waki River, in Butiaba, Masindi District, in Western Uganda. This location lies near the eastern shores of Lake Albert, near the point where River Waki empties into the lake. Butiaba lies approximately 60 kilometres (37 mi), by road, west of Masindi, the location of the district headquarters, and the nearest large town.

== Overview ==
The Waki Hydropower Project, will be a run of the river, mini-hydropower installation, with installed capacity of 5 MW. The energy generated will be fed into the national electric grid via either an 11 kV or a 22 kV transmission line. Feasibility studies were initiated in 1997. More recently, in 2006, SN Power Invest of Norway, carried out new feasibility studies on Waki and Buseruka power projects. However, SN Power Invest abandoned the project and in 2008, the development license was re-allocated to Tronder Power Limited, also from Norway. However, Tronder Power Limited also pulled out of the deal and in 2010, the license for Waki Power Station was allocated to Hydromax. The power station will be owned and operated by Hydromax, a private energy investor, who developed Buseruka Power Station in Hoima District, between 2005 and 2013.

== Construction timetable ==
Construction was initially expected to begin in 2012, with commissioning anticipated in 2014. In October 2014, the Electricity Regulatory Authority (ERA), awarded the electricity production license to the developers of the power station. Construction is expected to begin in December 2014, with completion planned in 24 months.

== See also ==
- Africa Dams
- Uganda Power Station
