= Nkusi Hydroelectric Power Station =

- Map of Uganda showing the location of Nkusi Power Station
- Country: Uganda
- Location: Nkusi Falls, Hoima District
- Coordinates: 01°07′10″N 30°40′05″E
- Status: Operational
- Opening date: 11 October 2018

Dam and spillways
- Impounds: Nkusi River

Reservoir
- Normal elevation: 800 m (2,600 ft)

Power Station
- Commission date: 11 October 2018
- Installed capacity: 9.6 MW (12,900 hp)

Nkusi Hydroelectric Power Station, also referred to as Nkusi Power Station, is a 9.6 MW (12,900 hp) hydroelectric power station in the Western Region of Uganda.

== Location ==
The power station is located across River Nkusi at the border between Hoima District and Kibaale District. This location is near Nguse village, where Nkusi Falls and the mouth of the river are located. The village is approximately 1 kilometre (1 mi), south of the power station and is located in Kitebere Parish, Ndaiga subcounty, Buyaga West County, in Kibaale District. The river, which forms the boundary between the two districts, meanders before it gushes over the falls into Lake Albert. The project area is found in both Kibale and Hoima districts. The powerhouse, which lies in Hoima District, lies in proximity to UNHCR Kyangwali Refugee Settlement (Kyangwali), which is approximately 77 kilometres (48 mi), by road, southwest of Hoima, the largest city in Bunyoro sub-region. This is approximately 296 kilometres (184 mi), by road, northwest of Kampala, the largest city and capital of Uganda. The coordinates of the power house are: 01°07'10.0"N, 30°40'05.0"E (Latitude:1.119444; Longitude:30.668056).

== Overview ==
The power station is a run-of-river hydro power plant with installed capacity of 9.6 megawatts (12,900 hp). It was developed by its owner, PA Technical Services, who operate it after construction was completed.

Due to the location on steep cliffs, along the lake shore, the approach to the power station is via watercraft (barge or boat) on Lake Albert. To access the water intake part of the station, there is a suspended footpath navigating the vertical cliffs over Nkusi Falls. Parts of the power station is accessed via a tunnel. The power generated is evacuated to a 132/33 kV substation near the power station, for integration into the national power grid.

== Financing and construction timetable ==
The budgeted cost of construction is US$23 million. Construction began in June 2015, and the completed power station was commissioned on 11 October 2018.

== See also ==
- List of power stations in Uganda
