= Mahoma =

Mahoma may refer to:

- The Spanish name for the prophet Muhammad
- Mahoma Mwakipunda Mwaungulu, pan-African politician
- Mahoma Hydroelectric Power Station, dam in Kabarole District, Uganda
