= Nyamagasani II Hydroelectric Power Station =

- Map of Uganda showing the location of Nyamagasani 2 Hydroelectric Power Station
- Country: Uganda
- Location: Kyarumba, Kasese District
- Coordinates: 00°07′48″N 29°56′33″E
- Status: Under construction
- Owner: Nyamagasani 2 Hydroelectric Power Project Limited

Dam and spillways
- Impounds: Nyamagasani River

Reservoir
- Normal elevation: 1,392 m (4,567 ft)

Power Station
- Commission date: 2019 (expected)
- Type: Run-of-the-river
- Turbines: 3
- Installed capacity: 5 MW (6,700 hp)

Nyamagasani II Hydroelectric Power Station, also 'Nyamagasani 2 Hydroelectric Power Station, is a 5 megawatts (6,700 hp) mini hydro power station, under construction in the Western Region of Uganda.

== Location ==
The power station is located near the village of Kyarumba, in Kaghema parish, Kyarumba sub-county, in Kasese District, in the foothills of the Rwenzori Mountains. This about 45.5 kilometres (28 mi), by road, southwest of Kasese, the nearest large town and the location of the district headquarters. Nyamagasani II Power Station lies close to and immediately downstream of its sister station Nyamagasani I Hydroelectric Power Station, which is under simultaneously development, by the same developers. Nyamagasani 2 is located at an altitude of about 1,392 metres (4,567 ft).

== Overview ==
Nyamagasani II HEPS is a run-of-river mini-hydro power plant, whose planned installed capacity is 5 MW. The project company, Nyamagasani 2 HPP Limited, is majority-owned by DI Frontier Market Energy & Carbon Fund, a Denmark-based renewable energy investment company.

== Timeline ==
The project received GetFit approval in June 2015, and financial close was achieved in 2016. Construction started in 2017. Completion was initially expected in the fourth quarter of 2018. As of June 2019, completion and commissioning were expected during the second half of 2019.

== Funding ==
Construction is budgeted to cost US$19.8 million, with US$3.7 million in GetFit subsidies. The funding includes money to build new 33 kV high-voltage lines to evacuate the power generated to Nkenda sub-station, approximately 36 kilometres (22 mi), to the northeast of Kyarumba, as the crow flies. This includes power generated from the adjacent Nyamagasi 1 Power station.

== See also ==
- Energy in Uganda
- List of power stations in Uganda
