= Nuclear power in Uganda =

Nuclear power is not a component of Uganda’s energy supply but continues to be explored by the country.

In 2008, the Parliament of Uganda enacted the Atomic Energy Act of 2008 which provides a framework for the use of nuclear energy in Uganda.

== History ==
Uganda has not constructed or operated a nuclear reactor.

Since 1982, Uganda has been a signatory to the Treaty on the Non-Proliferation of Nuclear Weapons to prevent the spread of nuclear weapons and weapons technology and to promote cooperation in the peaceful uses of nuclear energy.

== Capacity building ==
The government of Uganda has taken steps to build the institutional knowledge and capacity to safely deploy nuclear power in the country. In late 2021, the International Atomic Energy Agency performed an Integrated Nuclear Infrastructure Review (INIR) mission was conducted at the invitation of the Government of Uganda.

== Development proposals ==
Since 2008, Uganda has indicated its willingness, determination, and intention to develop nuclear power for peaceful means, using locally available uranium deposits. With an electrification rate of 20 per cent as of June 2016, according to the Uganda Bureau of Statistics, the country will need more than what it can develop from hydroelectric sites, to satisfy the need for electricity nationwide. The country plans to generate 40,000 megawatts of electricity to meet its goals under the Vision 2040 development plan.

In October 2016, Uganda asked Russia for help in the development of nuclear power. In September 2019, Uganda signed an Inter-Governmental Agreement (IGA) with Russia to build capacity to exploit nuclear technology for energy, medical and other peaceful purposes.

As of late 2022, Uganda's government announced that they were working with parties from Russia, China, and the United States on their development plans, seeking to build up to 2,000 MW of nuclear generation capacity. In 2023, Uganda signed declarations with Korea and Russia for 15 GW.

== Power stations ==
No nuclear power plants or research reactors have been constructed or operated in Uganda.

== See also ==
- Energy in Uganda
- Ministry of Energy and Mineral Development (Uganda)
- Uganda Atomic Energy Council
- List of power stations in Uganda
