= Muvumbe Hydroelectric Power Station =

Power station in Uganda

Muvumbe Small Hydro Power Project
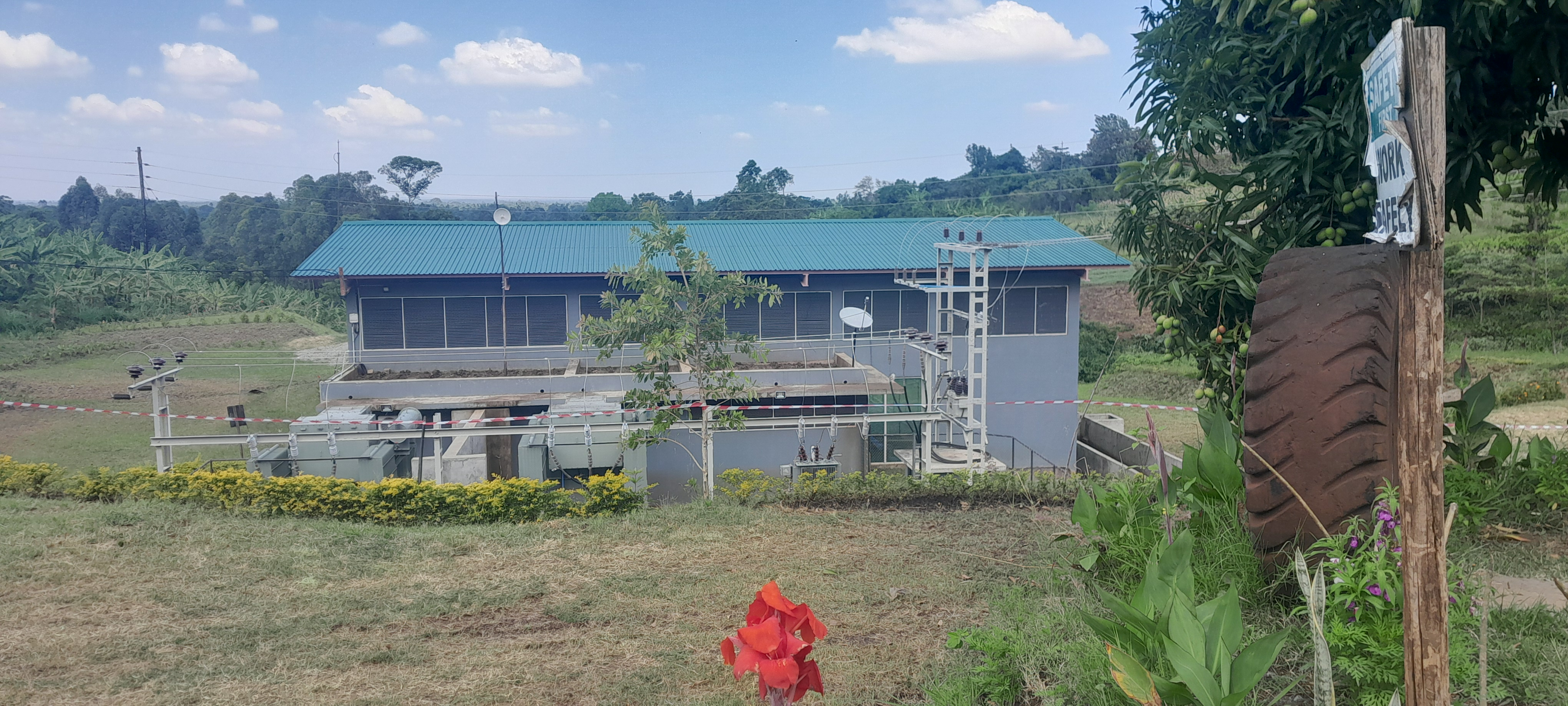
- Map of Uganda showing the location of Maziba
- Country: Uganda
- Location: Maziba, Kabale District
- Coordinates: 01°19′07″S 30°04′44″E
- Status: Operational
- Commission date: March 2017
- Owner: Muvumbe Hydro Uganda Limited

Power generation
- Nameplate capacity: 6.5 MW (8,700 hp)

External links
- Commons: Related media on Commons

Muvumbe Hydroelectric Power Station is a 6.5 megawatts (8,700 hp) hydroelectric power station in the Western Region of Uganda.

== Location ==
The power station was built across the River Nyakijumba (also known as the River Maziba or the River Muvumbe), a tributary of the Kagera River. The station is in Kigarama village in Nyanja parish, Maziba Sub-county, Kabale District, in south-western Uganda, close to the international border with Rwanda. This is approximately 10 kilometres (6.2 mi), by road, southeast of the town of Kabale, where the district headquarters are located. Maziba is approximately 410 kilometres (250 mi), by road, south-west of Kampala, the capital and largest city of Uganda. The coordinates of the power station are 1°19'07.0"S, 30°04'44.0"E (Latitude=-1.318611; Longitude=30.078889).

== History ==
The new power plant lies at the site of a smaller 1.6 megawatts (2,100 hp) hydroelectric power plant that was constructed in 1966 but went out of commission in 2002 due to disrepair and silting. In 2009, a new feasibility study was carried out by Lahmeyer International, a German consulting engineering firm, paving way for the new power plant. In April 2014, Muvumbe Hydro (Uganda) Limited applied for a power production license from the Electricity Regulatory Authority to generate and sell 6.5 megawatts of hydroelectric power at this power station. The power will be sold to the Uganda Electricity Transmission Company Limited and integrated into the national grid. Construction started in September 2015 and is expected to last 18 months.

== Construction costs ==
The estimated costs for the dam and power plant is US$18 million (approximately UGX:64 billion). Construction funds will be sourced jointly by the Sri Lankan developers and the government of Uganda. In January 2015, Ugandan Prime Minister Ruhakana Rugunda indicated that funding for the dam had been secured from Germany. Muvumbe Hydro Uganda Limited, a subsidiary of Vidullanka Plc. of Sri Lanka, owns the development rights to the project.

== Construction timeline ==
Construction started in September 2015 and commercial power production began in March 2017.

== See also ==
- List of power stations in Uganda
