= Mahoma Hydroelectric Power Station =

- Map of Uganda showing the location of Mahoma Hydroelectric Power Station.
- Country: Uganda
- Location: Kabarole District
- Coordinates: 00°28′43″N 30°16′23″E
- Status: Operational
- Opening date: 16 October 2018

Dam and spillways
- Impounds: River Mahoma

Reservoir
- Normal elevation: 1,346 metres (4,416 ft)

Power Station
- Turbines: 2 x 1.5MW
- Installed capacity: 3.0 MW (4,000 hp)

Mahoma Hydroelectric Power Station is a 3.0 megawatts (4,000 hp) mini-hydroelectric power plant in Uganda.

== Location ==
The power station is located across the Mahoma River (also Dura River), in Kabarole District, Western Uganda. This location is approximately 36 kilometres (22 mi), south of the city of Fort Portal, where the district headquarters are located.

The power station has a catchment area that measures 275 square kilometres (106 sq mi), with an average elevation of 1,346 metres (4,416 ft), above mean sea level.

== Overview ==
This power station was developed by two Sri Lankan companies, the MG Group of Companies and Renewgen Limited. The Mahoma mini-hydro project is a run-of-the-river hydroelectricity project with planned annual output of 3,000kW of energy

The power generated is sold to the Uganda Electricity Transmission Company Limited (“UETCL”), and distributed into the national electricity grid, with priority being given to local residents, by design and by agreement with the Electricity Regulatory Authority, via a 20 year power purchase agreement.

== Ownership and funding ==
The power station is owned and operated by the two Sri Lankan energy companies that developed the power station, over a twenty-months period, from January 2017 until October 2018. The cost of construction is reported at US$8 million (USh29.6 billion). The main contractor on this project was KSJ Construction of Sri Lanka.

The same investors also own the 7.6 megawatts Kyambura Hydroelectric Power Station, developed across the Kyambura River in Rubirizi District.

== See also ==
- List of power stations in Uganda
