= Buranga Geothermal Power Station =

Geothermal power station in Uganda

- Country: Uganda
- Location: Buranga Hot Springs; Bundibugyo District
- Coordinates: 00°49′59″N 30°10′01″E
- Status: Proposed
- Construction began: 2018 (expected)
- Commission date: 2022 (expected)

Thermal power station
- Primary fuel: Geothermal

Power generation
- Nameplate capacity: 100 MW (130,000 hp)

The Buranga Geothermal Power Station is a proposed 100 MW (130,000 hp) geothermal power station in Uganda.

== Location ==
The power station would be located at Buranga Hot Springs, off the Fort Portal–Bundibugyo–Lamia Road in Bundibugyo District, approximately 61 kilometres (38 mi), by road, northwest of Fort Portal, the nearest large city. This location is approximately 355 kilometres (221 mi), by road, west of Kampala, Uganda's capital city. The coordinates of Buranga Hot Springs are 0°49'59.0"N, 30°10'01.0"E (Latitude:0.833062; Longitude:30.166947).

== Overview ==
As part of efforts to diversify the national electricity sources, the government of Uganda licensed Green Impact Development Services (GIDS) to drill an exploratory well in the Buranga Hot Springs area. Pre-feasibility studies at this location have indicated subsurface water temperatures of 150 °C (302 °F) to 200 °C (392 °F), which are suitable for electricity generation. GIDS plans to drill three deep wells and to generate at least 30 megawatts from each well. However, some sources have indicated that these plans may be too ambitious for a greenfield site with no prior history of geothermal output.

== Funding ==
The cost of construction is budgeted at US$42 million.

== Recent developments ==
Following an explosion at a drilling site located at Kibiro in Hoima District on the night of 29 March 2020, the Uganda Ministry of Energy and Mineral Development halted drilling at that site, at another site in Panyimur, Pakwach District and at the Buranga site in Bundibugyo District. Drilling may resume after a detailed environmental and social impact assessment (ESIA) is conducted.

== See also ==
- List of power stations in Uganda
- Energy in Uganda
