= Kinyara Sugar Works Limited =

Ugandan company

Coordinates: 01°38′14″N 31°36′30″E

Kinyara Sugar Limited
- Company type: Private: Subsidiary of Sarrai Group
- Industry: Manufacture & Marketing of Sugar
- Founded: 1969
- Headquarters: Kinyara, Masindi, Uganda
- Products: Sugar
- Number of employees: 12,150 (2022)
- Website: Homepage

Kinyara Sugar Limited (KSL) formally Kinyara Sugar Works Limited (KSWL), is a sugar manufacturer in Uganda.

== Location ==
The main factories of the company are located in the town of Kinyara in Masindi District in Uganda's Western Region. Kinyara is approximately 17 kilometres (11 mi), by road, west of Masindi, the nearest large town and the location of the district headquarters. This location is approximately 227 kilometres (141 mi), by road, north-west of Kampala, the capital and largest city of Uganda. The coordinates of the company factory are 1°38'14.0"N, 31°36'30.0"E (Latitude: 1.637222; Longitude:31.608333).

== Overview ==
KSL is the second-largest manufacturer of sugar in Uganda, producing an estimated 110,000 metric tonnes annually, accounting for approximately 31 percent of national output. According to a 2011 published report, the estimated 350,000 metric tonnes of sugar produced by the four leading sugar manufacturers in Uganda are marketed to the East African countries of Burundi, the Democratic Republic of the Congo, Kenya, Rwanda, South Sudan, Tanzania, and Uganda.

== History ==
In 1955, the Omukama of Bunyoro Kitara Kingdom Tito Owinyi was given land by the Bunyoro Native Government. He opened a Jaggery factory in Kinyara, where the current factory is located. Owinyi began production of molasses in 1959, selling it to the Lango, Acholi and West Nile districts. The whole of northern Uganda relied on this product from Kinyara for their alcohol brewing and the sweetening of other products. In the late 1960s, the government of Uganda asked the Omukama of Bunyoro to partner with him and the Kingdom of Bunyoro. He convinced the Orukurato (Parliament) of Bunyoro Kitara Kingdom to allow the government to expand the factory and the plantation. The central government and Bunyoro Kingdom agreed and a memorandum of understanding was signed between the central government and Bunyoro Kitara Kingdom, requiring the central government to pay 30 percent to Bunyoro Kingdom and the Omukama of Bunyoro. This relationship continued until 1966 when the kingdom was abolished, but the factory continued to run. During the political and economic turmoil in Uganda in the 1970s and 1980s, Kinyara was adversely affected and production of sugar ceased. In the 1990s, KSWL was rehabilitated by Booker Tate Limited with aid and loan agreements for various funders underwritten by the Ugandan government. Sugar production resumed in 1995.

Following the resumption and stabilization of sugar production, the government sold 51 percent shareholding in Kinyara Sugar Limited to the then Rai Group (today: Sarrai Group), an agribusiness conglomerate.

In September 2011, the Uganda government sold a further 19 percent shareholding in KSL to the Rai Group for US$9.1 million in cash. The sales agreement called for the Rai Group to float this shareholding in an IPO on the Uganda Securities Exchange after five years. Previous agreements called for the sale of the remaining 30 percent shareholding to the following entities: 10 percent to the Omukama of Bunyoro, 10 percent to the KSWL outgrowers, and 10 percent to KSL employees. That process was ongoing as of September 2011.

== Production outlook ==
In September 2011, the Rai Group, who owned 70 percent of the company shares, signed commitments to invest US$55 million in the factory within three years, increase production to at least 200,000 metric tonnes annually within the same time period, and use the baggase to generate 35 megawatts of electricity, of which 22 megawatts were to be sold to the national grid.

== Industrial sugar ==
In February 2022, KSL commissioned a production line that manufactures industrial sugar, used in the manufacture of soft drinks, confectioneries, pharmaceuticals and other industrial processes. KSL is capable of producing 60,000 metric tones of industrial sugar annually, starting with 70,000 metric tonnes of brown sugar. At that time Uganda's demand for industrial sugar ranged between 78,000 and 90,000 metric tomes annually.

== Subsidiaries ==
KSL is the sole owner of the Kinyara Power Station, a 14.5 megawatt bagasse-fired thermal electrical plant that, as of July 2013, was in the process of expanding power production capacity to 40 megawatts by 2015.

== See also ==
- List of sugar manufacturers in Uganda
- List of power stations in Uganda
