= Mayuge Thermal Power Station =

Power station in Uganda

- Country: Uganda
- Location: Bunya Village, Mayuge District
- Coordinates: 00°30′19″N 33°24′56″E
- Status: Operational
- Commission date: 2005
- Owner: Mayuge Sugar Industries Limited

Thermal power station
- Primary fuel: Bagasse

Power generation
- Nameplate capacity: 1.6 MW

Mayuge Thermal Power Station is a 1.6 megawatt bagasse-fired thermal power plant in Uganda, the third-largest economy in the East African Community.

== Location ==
The power station is located on the campus of Mayuge Sugar Industries Limited (MSIL), the owners of the station. This is in the village of Bunya, about 9 kilometres (6 mi) northwest of the town of Mayuge, in Mayuge District, Eastern Region of Uganda. This is about 20 kilometres (12 mi) southwest of Iganga, the nearest large town. Mayuge Power Station is located about 28 kilometres (17 mi), by road, east of Jinja, the largest city in the sub-region. The coordinates of the power station are 0°30'19.0"N, 33°24'56.0"E (latitude:0.505281; longitude:33.415560).

== Overview ==
The power station is owned and operated by MSIL, one of the sugar manufacturers in Uganda. The station was designed and built around the sugar manufacturing plant of MSIL. The fibrous residue from the process of crushing sugar cane, known as bagasse, is burnt to heat water in boilers and produce steam. The steam is pressurized and used to drive turbines, which then generate electricity. The excess heat is used in the sugar manufacturing process. As of January 2015, the station was capable of producing a maximum of 1.6 megawatts of electricity, for internal use.

== Licensure ==
In April 2014, the Electricity Regulatory Authority received an application for expanding the power station to a generation capacity of 21-23 megawatts. The generated power will be used internally by the factory, with the excess sold to the Uganda Electricity Transmission Company Limited and integrated into the national grid. As of July 2015, the expansion was at "Feasibility Study Stage".

== See also ==
- List of power stations in Uganda
- Economy of Uganda
