= Nyamagasani I Hydroelectric Power Station =

Nyamagasani 1 Hydroelectric Power Station
- Map of Uganda showing the location of Nyamagasani 1 Hydroelectric Power Station
- Country: Uganda
- Location: Kyarumba, Kasese District
- Coordinates: 00°08′16″N 29°56′05″E
- Status: Under construction
- Owner: Rwenzori Hydro Private Limited

Dam and spillways
- Impounds: Nyamagasani River

Reservoir
- Normal elevation: 1,392 m (4,567 ft)

Power Station
- Commission date: 2019 (expected)
- Type: Run-of-the-river
- Turbines: 3
- Installed capacity: 15 MW (20,000 hp)

Nyamagasani I Hydroelectric Power Station, also Nyamagasani 1 Hydroelectric Power Station is a 15 megawatts (20,000 hp) hydroelectric power project, under construction in Uganda.

== Location ==
The power station is located near the village of Kyarumba, in Kasese District, approximately 45.3 kilometres (28 mi), by road, south-west of Kasese, the nearest large town.

== Overview ==
Nyamagasani I Hydroelectric Power Station is a run-of-river hydro-power plant, with initial planned capacity installation of 15 megawatts (20,115 hp), when completed. The project lies across the Nyamagasani River, adjacent to its sister project, Nyamagasani II Hydroelectric Power Station, high in the foothills of the Rwenzori Mountains, at an average elevation of about 1,392 metres (4,567 ft). The project company, Rwenzori Hydro Private Limited, is majority-owned by DI Frontier Market Energy & Carbon Fund, a Denmark-based renewable energy investment company.

== Construction costs ==
The construction of this power station is budgeted at US$36.7 million, with US$9.4 million, in GetFit concessions.

== See also ==
- List of power stations in Uganda
- List of hydropower stations in Africa
