= Energy in Uganda =

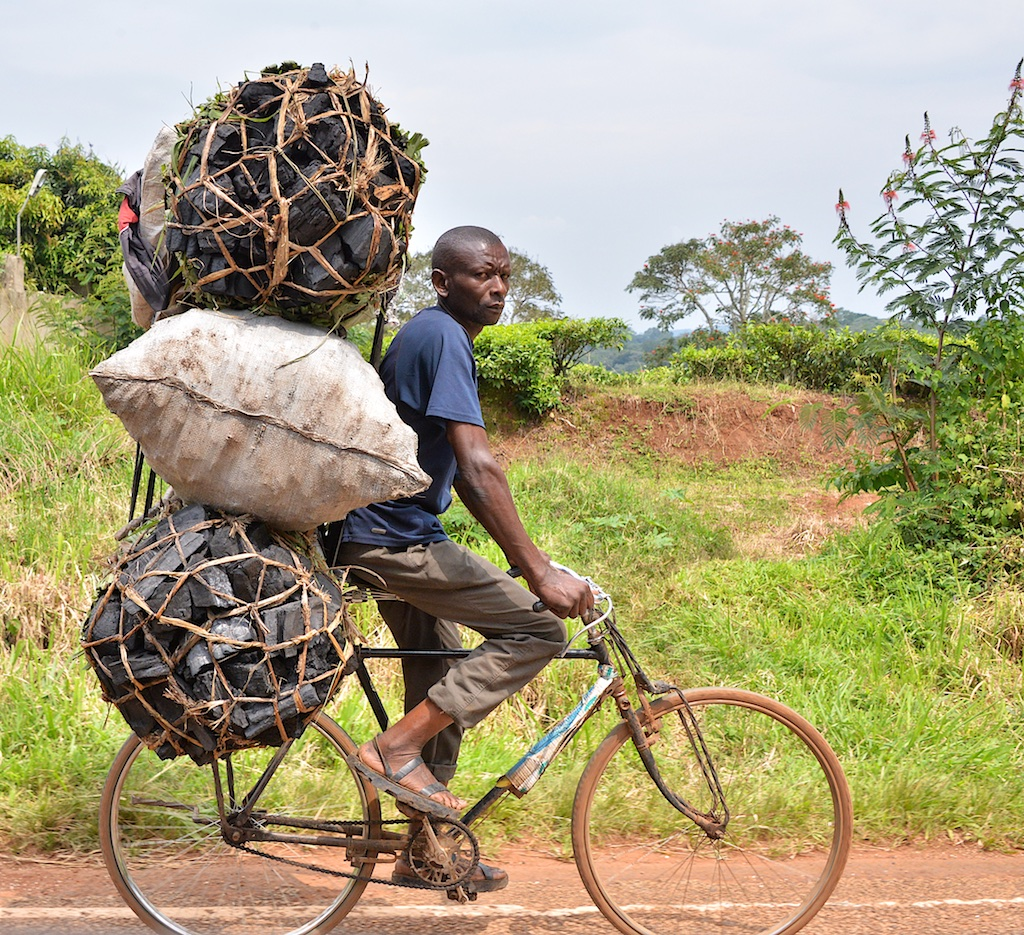
Charcoal delivery, Uganda

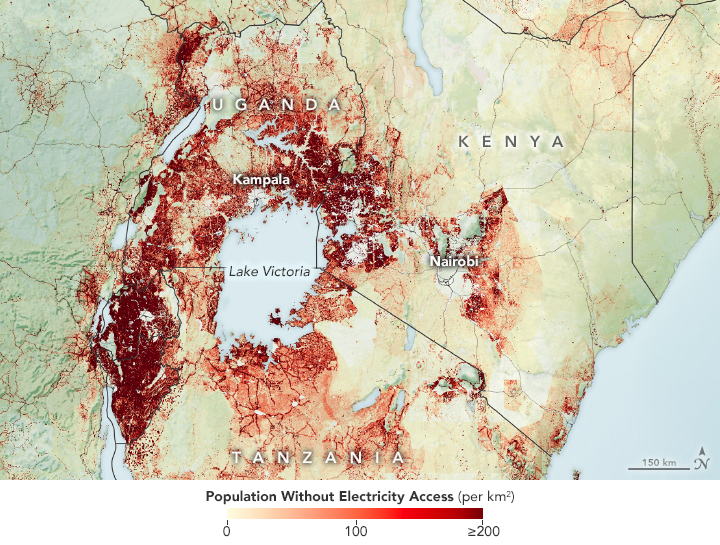
Population with electricity in East Africa

Burning of renewable resources provides approximately 90 percent of the energy in Uganda, though the government is attempting to become energy self-sufficient. While much of the hydroelectric potential of the country is untapped, the government decision to expedite the creation of domestic petroleum capacity coupled with the discovery of large petroleum reserves holds the promise of a significant change in Uganda's status as an energy-importing country.

== Background ==
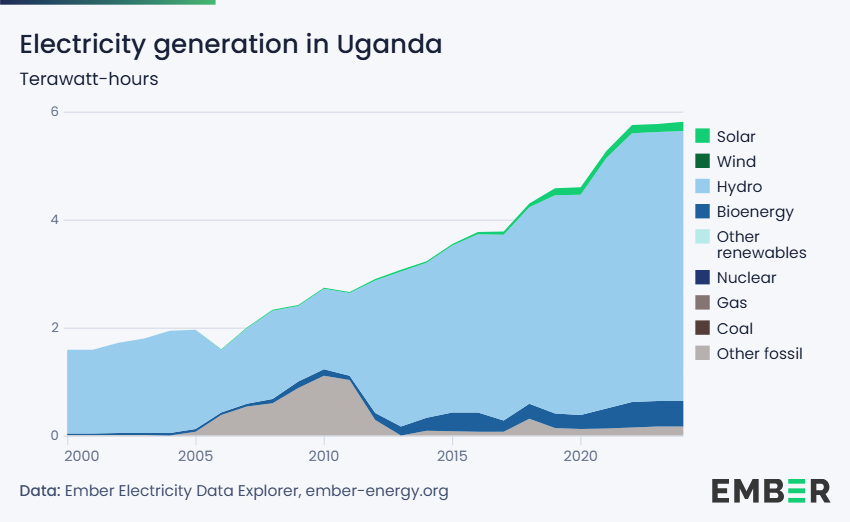
Electricity generation in Uganda by source in terawatt-hours

In the 1980s, charcoal and fuel wood met more than 95 percent of Uganda's energy needs. In 2005 and 2006, low water levels of Lake Victoria, the main source of the country's electricity generation potential, led to a generation shortage and an energy crisis. As a result, the country experienced frequent and prolonged blackouts. As of June 2016, according to the Uganda Bureau of Statistics, about twenty percent of Ugandans had access to electricity. As of February 2015 and according to the Uganda Electricity Regulatory Authority, Uganda's installed electricity capacity was 810 megawatts, with peak demand of 509.4 megawatts so that "the incidence of load shedding due to shortage in supply is now close to zero." As of September 2017, according to Irene Muloni, the Uganda Minister of Energy, the country's generation capacity had increased to 950 megawatts. Uganda expects to have a generating capacity of at least 1,900 megawatts by the end of 2019, as forecast by the Uganda Ministry of Energy and Mineral Development. In March 2018, the World Bank Group estimated that about 26 percent of Uganda's population had access to grid-electricity at that time. In March 2019, the United States Department of Commerce estimated that 55 percent of Uganda's urban population and about 10 percent of the country's rural population has access to grid electricity then. As of April 2019, generation capacity was 1,167 megawatts, with peak demand of about 625 megawatts and approximately 25 percent national electrification rate. At that time, an estimated 1,000 new customers were requesting grid power connection on a daily basis, with over 1.3 million existing Umeme connections. As of October 2019, the Uganda Ministry of Energy and Mineral Development estimated that 28 percent of Uganda's population had access to electricity. In September 2019, Uganda signed an Inter-Governmental Agreement (IGA) with Russia to build capacity to exploit nuclear technology for energy, medical and other peaceful purposes.

As of March 2022, the national electricity sources were as illustrated in the table below:

Sources of Electricity in Uganda as of March 2022
Rank	Source	Quantity (MW)	Percentage of Total
1	Hydroelectricity	1,072.9	79.7
2	Bagasse Co-generation	111.7	8.2
3	Heavy fuel oil	101.1	7.5
4	Solar power	60.9	4.6
5	Wind	0	0.0
6	Geothermal	0	0.0
7	Nuclear	0	0.0
8	Other	0	0.0
	Total	1,346.6	100.0

In December 2023, PML Daily, a Ugandan online publication reported that at that time, the national generation capacity was 1,346 megawatts, with a national electrification rate of 42 percent, which was expanding at an average rate of 3 percent annually. The national peak demand for February 2023 was reported as 863 MW. As of December 2023, national generation capacity was approximately 1,350 megawatts, with maximum demand of 988 MW, of which 868 MW was national consumption and 120 MW was export demand. In September 2024, the 600 MW Karuma Hydroelectric Power Station was commercially commissioned, bringing national generation capacity to about 2,007 megawatts.

=== Greenhouse gas targets ===
Uganda aims to lower its greenhouse gas emissions by enacting measures in its energy, forestry and wetland sectors. Uganda's greenhouse gas emissions per capita is 1.39 tons carbon dioxide, one of the lowest in the world. The country aims to reduce its carbon emissions by 22 percent by 2030.

== Hydroelectricity ==
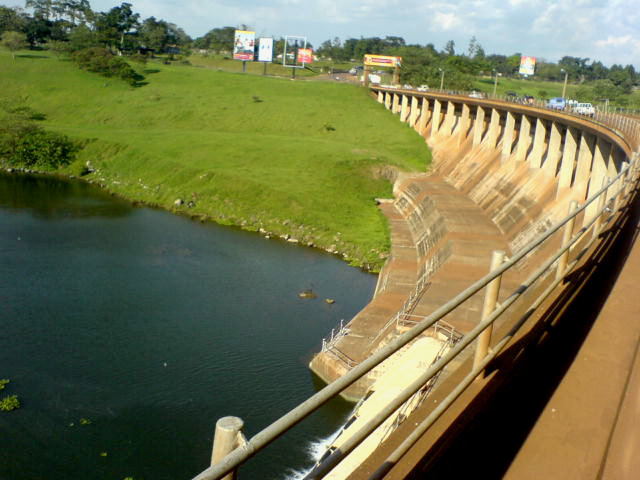
Nalubaale Power Station, 2007.

The country's hydropower potential is an estimated 2,200 megawatts.

Poor maintenance during the politically unstable 1980s resulted in a drop in production at the Owen Falls Dam (now Nalubaale Power Station), at the mouth of the White Nile, from 635.5 million kilowatt-hours in 1986 to 609.9 million kilowatt-hours in 1987, with six of ten generators broken by the end of 1988. The 200 megawatt Kiira Hydroelectric Power Station, built adjacent to the Nalubaale Power Station, raised total production capacity to 380 megawatts.

Between 2007 and 2012, the 250 megawatt Bujagali Hydroelectric Power Station was constructed as a public-private project, at a cost of approximately US$862 million. The consortium that owns the station includes the Aga Khan Fund for Economic Development, SN Power (a subsidiary of the Norwegian Investment Fund for Developing Countries), and the government of Uganda. Bujagali Energy Limited is a special-vehicle company created to run the power station on behalf of the shareholders.

In October 2013, construction of the 183 megawatt Isimba Power Station began, approximately 40 kilometres (25 mi) downstream of Bujagali, at a budgeted cost of approximately US$590 million, as a public enterprise with funding from the Export-Import Bank of China. Commissioning was planned during the second half of 2018. However, construction was completed in January 2019, and commercial operations began in March 2019.

Also in 2013, work on the 600 megawatt Karuma Power Station commenced at a budgeted cost of about US$2 billion, including US$250 million to build the high-voltage transmission lines to evacuate the generated power. Completion was planned for late 2018. However, a more realistic completion date is in late 2019 or early 2020.

As of May 2015, about six operational mini-hydropower plants are connected to the national electricity grid, supplying about 65 megawatts. These include Nyagak I (3.5 megawatts), Kabalega (9 megawatts), Kanungu (6.6 megawatts), Bugoye (13 megawatts), Mubuku I (5 megawatts), Mubuku III (10 megawatts), and Mpanga (18 megawatts).

== Thermal power ==
Two heavy fuel oil thermal power stations exist in the country.

Namanve Power Station is a 50 megawatt plant formerly owned by Jacobsen Electricity Company (Uganda) Limited, a wholly owned subsidiary of Jacobsen Elektro, an independent Norwegian power production company. The plant cost US$92 million (€66 million) to build in 2008. The power station reverted to Uganda Electricity Generation Company Limited in February 2022.

Tororo Power Station is an 89 megawatt heavy fuel-oil powered plant owned by Electro-Maxx Limited, a Ugandan company and a subsidiary of the Simba Group of Companies, owned by Ugandan industrialist Patrick Bitature. This plant is licensed to sell up to 50 megawatts to the national electricity grid.

Namanve and Tororo are used as stand-by power sources to avoid load-shedding when hydropower generation fails to meet demand.

Five sugar manufacturers in Uganda have total cogeneration capacity of about 110 megawatts, of which about 50 percent is available for sale to the national grid. The cogeneration power plants and their generation capacities include Kakira Power Station (52 megawatts), Kinyara Power Station (40 megawatts), Lugazi Power Station (14 megawatts), Kaliro Power Station (12 megawatts) and Mayuge Thermal Power Station (1.6 megawatts).

== Oil and natural gas ==
Uganda is highly vulnerable to oil price shocks as it imports almost all of its 18,180 barrels per day (2,890 m^{3}/d) of oil (2013 figure). The oil comes through the Kenyan port of Mombasa.

The governments of Kenya, Uganda, and Rwanda are jointly developing the Kenya–Uganda–Rwanda Petroleum Products Pipeline to carry refined petroleum products from Mombasa through Nairobi to Eldoret, all in Kenya. From Eldoret, the pipeline will continue through Malaba to Kampala in Uganda, continuing on to Kigali in Rwanda. The feasibility study for the Eldoret to Kampala pipeline extension was awarded to an international firm in 1997. The study was completed in 1998 and the report submitted the following year. The separate feasibility study for the Kampala to Kigali extension was awarded to the East African Community in September 2011. The governments of Kenya, Uganda, and Rwanda accepted the findings of the studies. The construction contract was initially awarded, in 2007, to Tamoil, a company owned by the Government of Libya. That contract was voided in 2012 after the company failed to implement the project. As of April 2014, fourteen companies had submitted bids to construct the pipeline extension from Kenya to Rwanda. Construction was expected to begin in 2014, with a 32-month construction time-frame. Commissioning was expected in 2016.

Hoima District (in red), located along Lake Albert, has been the site of the petroleum finds.

In 2006, Uganda confirmed the existence of commercially viable petroleum reserves in the Western Rift Valley around Lake Albert. In June 2006, Hardman Resources of Australia discovered oil sands at Waranga 1, Waranga 2, and Mputa. President Yoweri Museveni announced that he expected production of 6,000 bbl/d (950 m^{3}/d) to 10,000 bbl/d (1,600 m^{3}/d) by 2009.

In July 2007, Heritage Oil, one of several companies prospecting around Lake Albert, raised its estimate for the Kingfisher well (block 3A) in Hoima District, Bunyoro sub-region, stating that they thought it was bigger than 600 million barrels (95,000,000 m^{3}) of crude. Heritage's partner, London-based Tullow Oil, which had bought Hardman Resources, was more guarded, but stated their confidence that the Albertine Basin as a whole contained over one billion barrels. The Kingfisher-1 well flowed 13,893 barrels per day (2,208.8 m^{3}/d) of 30-32 API oil.

This news came on the heels of Tullow's 11 July 2007 report that the Nzizi 2 appraisal well confirmed the presence of 14 million cubic feet (400,000 m^{3}) per day of natural gas. Heritage in a report to its partners talked of Ugandan reserves of 2.4 billion barrels (380,000,000 m^{3}) worth $7 billion as the "most exciting new play in sub-Saharan Africa in the past decade." However, development will require a 750 miles (1,210 km) pipeline to the coast, which will need $80 oil to justify. Relations between Uganda and the neighboring Democratic Republic of the Congo (DRC) have been tense since the discovery of oil, as both countries seek to clarify the border delineation on the lake in their favor, in particular the ownership of small Rukwanzi Island. Ugandan foreign minister Sam Kutesa made an emergency visit to Kinshasa in an attempt to smooth tensions.

The Economist magazine, noting that the DRC has assigned exploration blocks on its side of the border, proposed that the situation should sort itself amicably: Uganda needs a stable and secure border in order to attract foreign investment developing the oil reserves, while the cost of transporting the oil to the DRC's sole port at Matadi is so prohibitive that the Congolese government is nearly obliged to seek pipeline access through Uganda.

After an initial period of disagreement between the Government of Uganda and the petroleum exploration companies, the two sides agreed in April 2013 to simultaneously build a crude oil pipeline to the Kenyan coast (Uganda–Kenya Crude Oil Pipeline) and an oil refinery in Uganda (Uganda Oil Refinery).

In February 2015, the Ugandan government selected the consortium led by Russia's RT Global Resources as the winning bidder, to construct the refinery. The government was expected to begin in-depth negotiations with the winning bidder for a binding agreement to construct the refinery. The negotiations were expected to last about 60 days. If the parties failed to agree on terms, the government planned to negotiate with the losing bidder, the consortium led by SK Energy of South Korea, to construct the refinery. When those talks broke down in July 2016, Uganda began talks with the reserve bidder, the consortium led by SK Engineering & Construction of South Korea.

In August 2017, negotiations with the consortium led by SK Engineering & Construction also broke down. Negotiations were then started with a new consortium led by Guangzhou Dongsong Energy Group, a Chinese company. Those talks collapsed in June 2017 when CPECC, the main contractor in the consortium, pulled out of the talks.

In August 2017, Albertine Graben Refinery Consortium, a new consortium led by General Electric (GE) of the United States agreed to build the US$4 billion refinery. GE is to own 60 percent, while the government of Uganda and other investors take up the remaining 40 percent. Total SA, has pledged to take up a 10 percent stake in the refinery.

In December 2017, Irene Muloni, Uganda's Energy Minister announced that the country planned to join the Organization of the Petroleum Exporting Countries (OPEC), by 2020, when first oil is expected.

== Solar energy ==
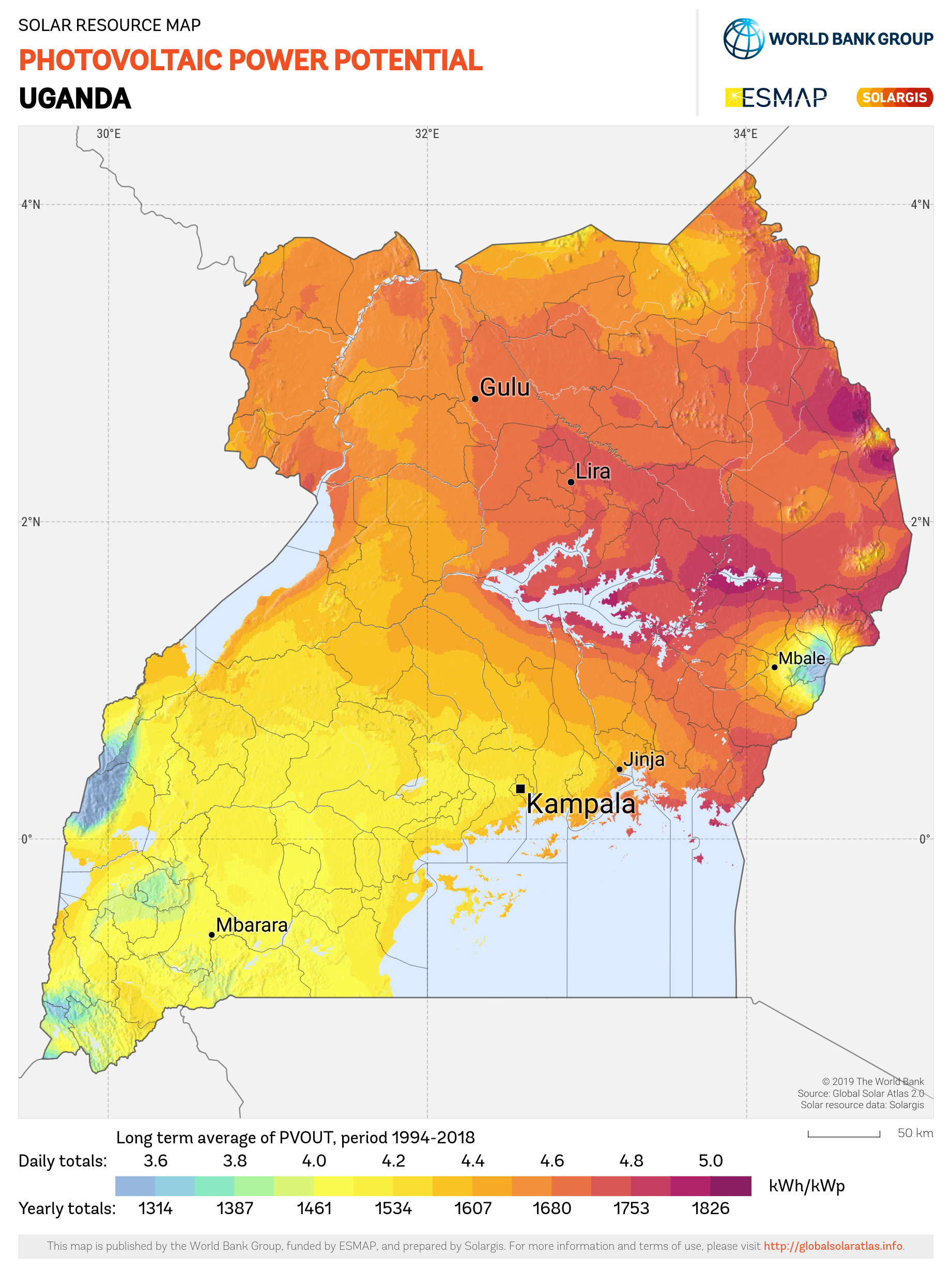
Uganda PVOUT Photovoltaic power potential map

The solar energy resource potential is an estimated 5.1 kilowatt-hours per square meter.

To diversify the national energy pool, the Electricity Regulatory Authority in December 2014 licensed two solar power stations, each with capacity to generate 10 megawatts. The stations, Tororo Solar Power Station and Soroti Solar Power Station, were expected to come online no later than December 2015. In December 2016, Soroti Solar Power Station was completed and connected to the national grid. Tororo Solar Power Station was also brought online in October 2017. In January 2019, Kabulasoke Solar Power Station, a 20 megawatt development by a private IPP was commissioned and connected to the national grid. Mayuge Solar Power Station, another 10 megawatts IPP project, that cost USh 41 billion (approx. US$11.3 million), to build, came online in June 2019, bringing total grid-connected solar energy to 50 megawatts nationally.

== Power sales to neighboring countries ==
As of May 2024, Kenya was in discussions with Uganda to establish a power purchase agreement, where Uganda would commit to sell electric power to her eastern neighbor at a fixed price, on a long-term basis. At that time, Uganda had about 350 MW in excess installed generation, with another 600 MW (Karuma Hydroelectric Power Station) expected to come online in the next 6 months.

== See also ==
- Ministry of Energy and Mineral Development
- Electricity Regulatory Authority (Uganda)
- List of power stations in Uganda
- Eastern Africa Power Pool
- Nuclear power in Uganda
