= Rukwanzi Island =

Disputed island in Central Africa

Disputed island
- Interactive map of Rukwanzi Island

Geography
- Location: Southwest Lake Albert in Central Africa
- Coordinates: 1°12′37″N 30°29′29″E
- Total islands: 1

Administration
- Democratic Republic of the Congo

Claimed by
- Uganda

Demographics
- Population: about 1000 (2007)

Rukwanzi Island is a disputed island in the southern portion of Lake Albert in Central Africa. It is home to approximately 1000 fishermen.

== Ownership dispute ==
Rukwanzi is the subject of an ownership dispute between the Democratic Republic of the Congo and Uganda, which are situated on opposite sides of the lake. In late July 2007, Congo apprehended four Ugandan soldiers it said had crossed the dividing line in the lake, and on August 3, 2007, the countries' militaries engaged in a skirmish near the island, with one Briton and one Congolese killed. On August 12, 2007, Congo occupied the area.

Rukwanzi Island deputes led to an intervention meeting between President Yoweri Museveni and Kabila to try and resolve the border deputes. The island has minority settlers who are fishermen and attempts to relocate the main inhabitants have turned violent leading to clashes that claimed lives. It is home to about 3000 people measuring 12 Square Kilometers.

== See also ==
- Energy in Uganda
