= Nyamwamba I Hydroelectric Power Station =

Power station in Uganda

- Map of Uganda showing the location of Nyamwamba I HPP
- Country: Uganda
- Location: Kilembe, Kasese District
- Coordinates: 00°12′45″N 30°00′20″E
- Purpose: Power
- Status: Operational
- Construction cost: US$24 million
- Owner: Serengeti Energy Limited
- Operator: Serengeti Energy Limited

Dam and spillways
- Impounds: Nyamwamba River

Reservoir
- Normal elevation: 1,680 m (5,510 ft)

Power Station
- Commission date: 2019
- Type: Run-of-the-river
- Turbines: 2
- Installed capacity: 9.2 MW (12,300 hp)

Nyamwamba I Hydroelectric Power Station, also referred to as Nyamwamba I Power Station, is a 9.2 megawatts mini-hydroelectric power station in Uganda.

== Location ==
The power station is located in the village of Kilembe, across the River Nyamwamba, in Kasese District in the Western Region of Uganda. This is in the foothills of the Rwenzori Mountains, close to the border with the Democratic Republic of the Congo. Nyamwamba I HPP lies approximately 12.5 kilometres (7.8 mi), by road, northwest of Kasese, the location of the district headquarters and the nearest large town.

== Overview ==
The power station is a run of the river mini-hydropower installation, with installed capacity of 9.2 MW. The renewable energy installation was developed by South Asia Energy Management Systems LLC (SAEMS), based in Sri Lanka. SAEMS is an IPP that acquires, develops, and operates run-of-the-river hydropower projects in emerging markets. Funding for the project will be provided by a loan from a consortium of lenders that include the Emerging Africa Infrastructure Fund, the Netherlands Development Finance Company, the German Investment Corporation, and the FinnFund. The power generated is intended for use by the town of Kasese with a population of 101,679 in 2014. The off-taker is the Uganda Electricity Transmission Company Limited (UETCL), the national electricity bulk transmitter company. The power generated will be evacuated via 33kV cables to Nkenda Substation, where it will enter the Ugandan grid. Nkenda is located approximately 23 kilometres (14 mi), by road, northeast of Nyamwamba I Hydroelectric Power Station.

== Construction costs ==
The construction costs are estimated at US$24 million. The contribution to those costs is as depicted in the table below:

Financing Sources For Nyamwamba I Power Station
Rank	Name of Lender	Loan Amount (US$ Million)	Percentage
1	Netherlands Development Finance Company	12.0	50
2	Emerging Africa Infrastructure Fund	6.0	25
3	German Investment Corporation	4.0	17
4	FinnFund	2.0	8
	Total	24.0	100.00

== Construction timetable ==
In October 2014, the Electricity Regulatory Authority licensed nine renewable energy power projects. One of the nine was Nyamwamba I Hydroelectric Power Station. Construction was expected to start in December 2014 and last about 2 years. However, construction was delayed due to flooding of the construction site, which required a re-design of the project. The original 14 megawatts capacity was scaled back to 9.2 megawatts. Construction started in 2015, with commissioning expected during the first quarter of 2018. In 2019, this power station, together with the 18 MW Mpanga Hydroelectric Power Station in Kamwenge District were acquired by Serengeti Energy Limited, formerly known as rAREH, which is based in Kenya.

== Other considerations ==
As of 2019, rAREH (today Serengeti Energy Limited) and SAEMS had a plan to jointly develop 7.8 MW Nyamwamba II Hydroelectric Power Station, upstream of Nyamwamba I HPP. Nyamwamba II HPP came online in March 2022.

== See also ==
- List of hydropower stations in Africa
- List of hydroelectric power stations
- List of power stations in Uganda
- List of power stations in Africa
