= Richard Matsiko =

Ugandan engineer and corporate executive

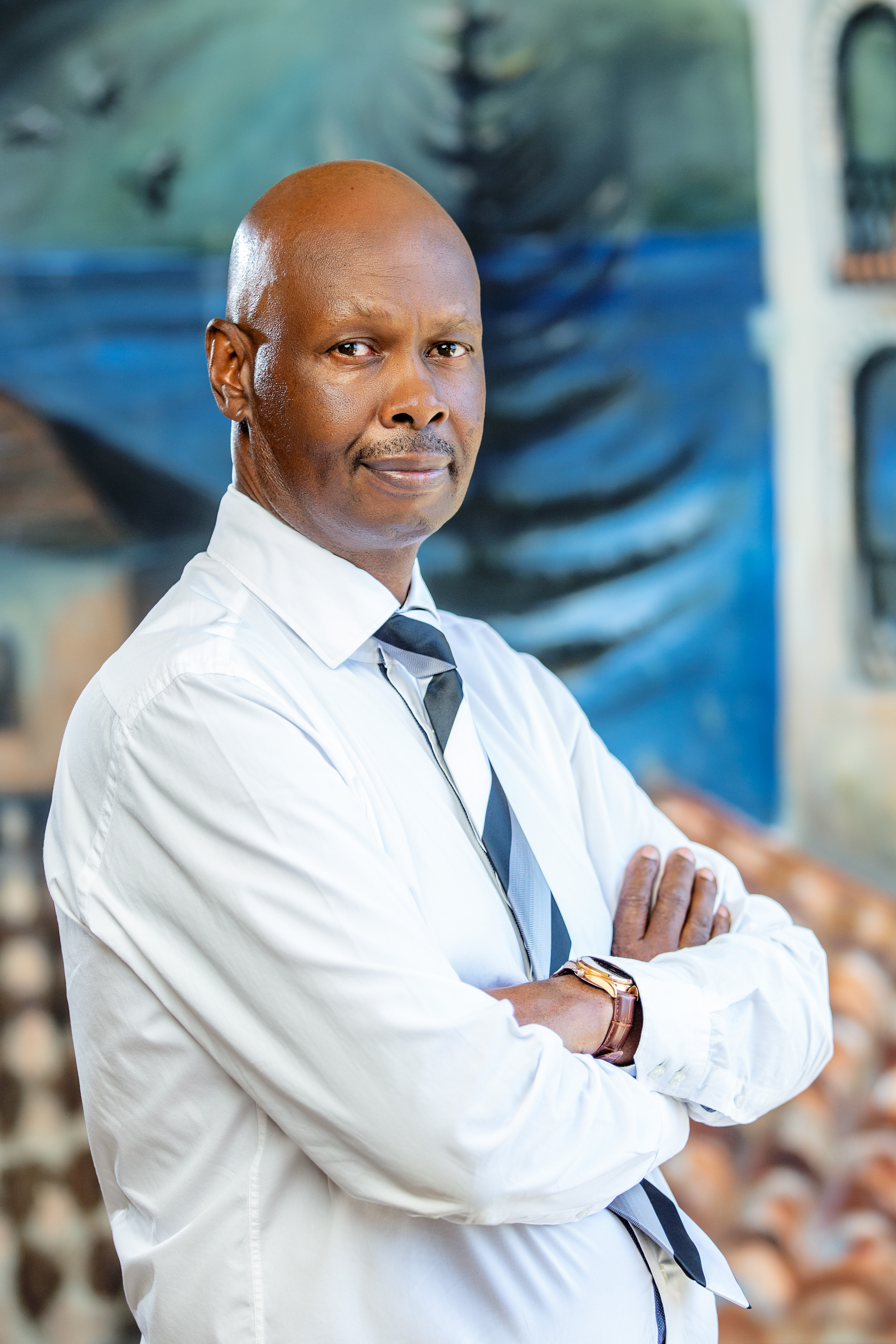
- Engineer Richard Matsiko
- Born: Uganda
- Citizenship: Uganda
- Education: Makerere University (Bachelor of Electrical Engineering)
- Occupations: Engineer, Corporate executive
- Years active: 1991– Present
- Known for: Electrical engineering, leadership
- Title: Chief Executive Officer Uganda Electricity Transmission Company Limited
- Website: www.uetcl.go.ug

Richard Matsiko, is a Ugandan electrical engineer and corporate executive. He is the chief executive officer of Uganda Electricity Transmission Company Limited (UETCL). He was appointed CEO on 30 January 2026, having served as Acting CEO since July 2025. Previously, over a period of over 30 years, he has served in various leadership roles, including Deputy CEO and Chairman of the Power Purchase Committee at UETCL, among others.

== Background and education ==
Richard Matsiko is Ugandan by birth. He holds a Bachelor of Electrical Engineering degree, awarded by Makerere University, Uganda's oldest and largest public university.

== Work experience ==
Matsiko joined the erstwhile Uganda Electricity Board (UEB) on 1 March 1991, as a trainee electrical engineer. When UEB was unbundled in 2001, he transitioned to the UETCL. He specialised in "power system protection". He gradually rose through the ranks to serve as the "Principal Protection Engineer" and eventually rose to the position of Deputy CEO at UETCL. On 24 July 2025, the board accepted the resignation of Joshua Karamagi as CEO of UETCL. That same day, the board appointed Engineer Richard Matsiko as Acting CEO.

After six months as the acting CEO, the UETCL board confirmed him as the substantive CEO on 30 January 2026. Among his responsibilities is overseeing the construction of UETCL Towers, the future headquarters of the electricity transmission parastatal company.

== See also ==
- Uganda Electricity Generation Company Limited
- Uganda Electricity Distribution Company Limited
- Electricity Regulatory Authority

== Succession table ==
CEO
Preceded by Joshua Karamagi (before 24 July 2025)	CEO of UETCL (since 30 January 2026)	Succeeded by Incumbent
