= Nengo Bridge Hydroelectric Power Station =

- Map of Uganda showing the location of Nengo Bridge
- Country: Uganda
- Location: Nengo Bridge, Rukungiri District
- Coordinates: 00°48′54″S 29°50′00″E
- Status: Proposed
- Owner: Jacobsen Elekro

Dam and spillways
- Impounds: Mirera River

Reservoir
- Normal elevation: 1,150 m (3,770 ft)

Power Station
- Commission date: 2017 (Expected)
- Type: Run-of-the-river
- Installed capacity: 6.7 MW (9,000 hp)

Nengo Bridge Hydroelectric Power Station, often referred to as Nengo Bridge Power Station is a planned 6.7 megawatts (9,000 hp) mini-hydroelectric power station in Uganda, the third-largest economy in the East African Community.

== Location ==
The power station is located across the Mirera River between Rukungiri District and Kanungu District at the location of Nengo Bridge, along the road between Rukungiri and Kanungu. This location lies approximately 13 kilometres (8.1 mi), by road, southwest of Rukungiri.

== Overview ==
Nengo Bridge Power Station is run of the river, mini-hydropower installation, with planned capacity of 6.7 MW. Jacobsen Elektro, a Norwegian power development company, through its Ugandan subsidiary, Jacobsen Elektro Uganda Limited, owns the development rights to the power station. Jacobsen Elektro also owns the 50-Megawatt Namanve Thermal Power Station in Mukono District, which they developed in 2008.

== Construction costs ==
As of October 2014, the exact construction budget for the power plant and the high-tension power lines that will evacuate the generated electricity to where it will be integrated into the national grid is not publicly known. As a comparison, Kanungu Power Station with capacity of 6.6 megawatts (8,900 hp), was developed by a different company between 2008 and 2011 at a total cost of US$14 million. Kanungu Power Station in the town of Kanungu, lies about 13 kilometres (8.1 mi), by road, southwest of Nengo Bridge.

== Construction time table ==
The power station is one of the nine renewable energy projects in Uganda that were awarded production licenses in October 2014 by the Electricity Regulatory Authority (ERA). Construction is expected to start in December 2014, and last approximately two years.

== See also ==
- List of power stations in Uganda
- Africa Dams
- Power Dams
