= Lubilia Hydroelectric Power Station =

Hydroelectric power station in Uganda

Lubilia Power Station
- Map of Uganda showing the location of Lubilia Power Station
- Country: Uganda
- Location: Kawembe, Kasese District
- Coordinates: 00°05′00″N 29°45′16″E
- Status: Proposed
- Commission date: 2017 (Expected)
- Owner: Lubilia Kawembe Hydro Limited

Power generation
- Nameplate capacity: 5.4 MW (7,200 hp)

Lubilia Hydroelectric Power Station, also Lubilia Kawembe Power Station, is a 5.4 MW hydroelectric power station in Uganda, the third-largest economy in the East African Community.

== Location ==
The Power Station is located across River Lubilia, in Ihandiro sub-county, Kasese District, in southwestern Uganda, close to the international border with the Democratic Republic of the Congo. This location is near the town of Mpondwe in Uganda, approximately 67 kilometres (42 mi), by road, southwest of Kasese, where the district headquarters are located.

== Overview ==
The power station is a run of river, 5.4 megawatts (7,200 hp), hydropower project across River Lubilia. The development rights to the power station are owned by Lubilia Kawembe Hydro Limited (LKHL). In May 2013, DI Frontier Market Energy & Carbon Fund, acquired majority shareholding in LKHL.

== Construction costs ==
As of December 2016, the estimated construction budget was US$18.7 million, with US$3.2 million in GetFit guarantees.

== Construction timetable ==
In October 2014, the Uganda Electricity Regulatory Authority (ERA), licensed Lubilia Power Station, granting permission to generate and sell 5.4MW of power to the national grid. Construction was expected to begin in December 2014 and last approximately two years. Construction started in March 2016 with completion expected in the fourth quarter of 2017.

== See also ==
- Uganda Power Stations
