= Ndugutu Hydroelectric Power Station =

Hydroelectric power station in Uganda

- Country: Uganda
- Location: Ndugutu, Bundibugyo District
- Coordinates: 00°36′56″N 29°58′46″E
- Status: Proposed
- Construction began: 2017
- Commission date: 2018 Expected
- Owner: KMR East Africa Company

Power generation
- Nameplate capacity: 5.9 MW (7,900 hp)

Ndugutu Hydroelectric Power Station, also called Ndugutu Power Station, is a proposed 5.9 MW (7,900 hp) mini-hydropower station in the Western Region of Uganda.

== Location ==
The power station would be located on the Ndugutu River, just outside Rwenzori National Park, in Bundibugyo District, in Uganda's Western Region, approximately 20 kilometres (12 mi), by road, southwest of the town of Bundibugyo, the nearest urban center and the location of the district headquarters. This location is in close proximity of the 5.9 megawatts (7,912 hp) Sindila Hydroelectric Power Station, which is owned by the same developer.

== Overview ==
Ndugutu HEPS is a run-of-river mini-hydro power plant whose planned maximum installed capacity is 4.8 MW. The project is owned by KMR East Africa Company (also Ndugutu Power Company Uganda Limited), the project developers. The construction of this power station was budgeted at US$15 million, with US$3.2 million in GetFit concessions.

== Timetable ==
The project received approval for GetFit support in June 2015. Financial close was reached in 2016. Construction was expected to start during 2017, with completion expected during the fourth quarter of 2018.

== See also ==
- List of power stations in Uganda
