= Mayuge Sugar Industries Limited =

Ugandan manufacturer

Coordinates: 00°30′21″N 33°24′55″E

- Company type: Private
- Industry: Manufacture and marketing of sugar
- Founded: 2005
- Headquarters: Mayuge, Uganda
- Products: Sugar
- Number of employees: 600+ (2014)
- Website: Homepage

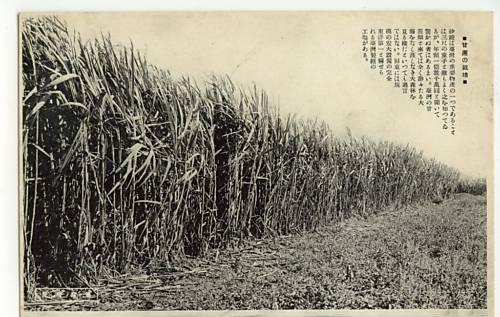
Sugarcane plantation

Mayuge Sugar Industries Limited (MSIL) is a sugar manufacturer in Uganda, the third-largest economy in the East African Community.

== Location ==
Mayuge Sugar Industries Limited is located on the Musita–Mayuge–Lumino–Majanji–Busia Road, in Mayuge District in the Eastern Region of Uganda, about 9 kilometres (6 mi) northwest of the town of Mayuge, the location of the district headquarters. This is about 20 kilometres (12 mi) south of Iganga, the nearest large town. The main factory of the company is located approximately 28 kilometres (17 mi), by road, east of Jinja, the largest city in the largest city in the sub-region. The coordinates of the company headquarters and factory are 0°30'21.0"N, 33°24'55.0"E (Latitude:0.505824; Longitude:33.415278).

== Overview ==
The company is a medium-sized sugar manufacturer, established in 2005, with production capacity of 60,000 metric tonnes annually. The sugar factory also owns and operates Mayuge Thermal Power Station, a 1.6 megawatt co-generation electric facility, with expandable capacity to 22 MW. MSIL is one of the newer sugar producers in the country that contributed to the projected national output of 450,000 metric tonnes expected in 2004.

== Ownership ==
MSIL is a wholly owned subsidiary of Maheswaris & Patels Group of Companies (M&P Group), an industrial conglomerate, whose interests include sugar manufacturing, electricity generation, steel manufacturing, metal fabrication and construction.

== Memberships ==
Mayuge Sugar Industries Limited is not a member of Uganda Sugar Manufacturers Association (USMA), an industry group of leading sugar manufacturers in the county. The company is a member of Uganda Manufacturers Association (UMA), an industry group.

== See also ==
- Economy of Uganda
- List of sugar manufacturers in Uganda
