= Sugar Corporation of Uganda Limited =

Sugar manufacturer in Uganda

Coordinates: 00°22′48″N 32°56′42″E

- Type: Parastatal
- Industry: Manufacture & distribution of sugar
- Founded: 1924
- Headquarters: Lugazi, Uganda
- Key people: Anil Kumar Shah; Chief executive of Mehta Group of Companies
- Products: Sugar
- Number of employees: 7,000+ (2006)
- Website: www.mehtagroup.com/sugar.html

Sugar Corporation of Uganda Limited (SCOUL) is a sugar manufacturer in Uganda, the third-largest economy in the East African Community.

== Overview ==
SCOUL is the third-largest manufacturer of sugar in Uganda, producing an estimated 60,000 metric tonnes annually, accounting for approximately 17 percent of national output. Its sugar is marketed in Uganda, Kenya, Tanzania, Rwanda, Burundi, the Democratic Republic of the Congo, and South Sudan. According to a 2010 published report, SCOUL was undergoing renovations and expansion to increase output to 100,000 metric tonnes annually by 2013.

== History ==
It was founded by Nanji Kalidas Mehta (the founder of the Mehta Group of Companies), now a Mumbai-based conglomerate, with business interests in Asia, Africa, Europe, and North America.

In 1900, at age 13, he left his native India and sailed to Eastern Africa, settling in Uganda near the town of Lugazi, Buikwe District in Buganda. Over the next 30 to 40 years, Mehta travelled between India and East Africa 46 times. In Uganda, he established cotton ginneries, a sugar plantation, a sugar factory, tea plantations, and coffee plantations. The sugar factory, established in 1924, eventually became SCOUL.

== Location ==
The main factory of the company is located in the town of Lugazi, approximately 48 kilometres (30 mi), by road, east of Kampala, the capital and the largest city of Uganda. The geographical coordinates of the SCOUL factory are 0°22'59.0"N, 32°56'27.0"E (Latitude:0.383056; Longitude:32.940833).

== Ownership ==
SCOUL is a subsidiary of the Mehta Group, a diversified industrial and investment conglomerate based in Mumbai, employing over 10,000 people in Asia, Africa, Europe, and North America. As of August 2011, the shareholding in SCOUL was as depicted in the table below:

SCOUL stock ownership
| Rank | Name of owner | Percentage ownership |
|---|---|---|
| 1 | Government of Uganda | 51.00 |
| 2 | Mehta Group | 49.00 |
| | Total | 100.00 |

== See also ==
- Lugazi Power Station
- Buikwe District
- Economy of Uganda
- List of sugar manufacturers in Uganda
