= Tororo Thermal Power Station =

Power station in Tororo, Uganda

- Location of Tororo Thermal Power Station in Uganda
- Country: Uganda
- Location: Tororo
- Coordinates: 00°38′14″N 34°07′00″E
- Status: Operational
- Commission date: 2010
- Owner: Electro-Maxx Limited

Thermal power station
- Primary fuel: Heavy fuel oil
- Secondary fuel: Biodiesel
- Tertiary fuel: Crude oil

Power generation
- Nameplate capacity: 89 MW (119,000 hp)

Tororo Thermal Power Station is a 89 MW (119,000 hp) heavy fuel oil-fired thermal power plant located in the town of Tororo in Tororo District in the Eastern Region of Uganda.

== Location ==
The power station is located in Tororo, approximately 11 kilometres (7 mi) southwest of downtown, along the Tororo–Bugiri road. The station is approximately 198 kilometres (123 mi), by road, east of Kampala, the capital and largest city of Uganda. The coordinates of the station are 0°38'14.0"N, 34°07'00.0"E (Latitude:0.637222; Longitude:34.116667).

== Overview ==
The power station is owned and operated by Electro-Maxx Limited, a private energy provider in Uganda, who built the power plant at an estimated cost of US$60 million. The plant uses heavy fuel oil (HFO), a byproduct of petroleum distillation. The plant currently imports HFO but in the future, it will leverage the country's natural assets and obtain domestically produced HFO or crude oil. The initial power station was fully commissioned in September 2010.

== Upgrade ==
In August 2012, Ugandan print media reported that the power station was in the process of upgrading the plant's capacity to 80 megawatts, at an estimated cost of US$60 million. The upgrade was expected to be complete by September 2012. In May 2017, the Uganda Ministry of Energy and Mineral Development gave the installed capacity at this power station at 89 megawatts. Upon commissioning of the plant, Electro-Maxx became the first indigenous independent power producer in Africa for power plants with capacity greater than 20 megawatts.

== Operation ==
The power station resumed operations in February 2014 with consistent dispatch. During 2013, the plant was on standby, producing power only when needed, such as a maintenance issue at a hydropower station. The standby period in 2013 resulted from a temporary high supply versus demand for power following the commissioning of the 250-megawatt Bujagali Power Station. With only twelve percent electrification and large industrial growth, demand is rising consistently, which increases the power required from the station.

In 2019, the power supply agreement that Electro-Maxx has with Uganda Electricity Transmission Company Limited (UETCL), the national sole bulk purchaser, was amended to allow the relocation of up to 8 megawatts of generation capacity to Arua City, to mitigate dire electricity shortage there. As of January 2021, only 3.8 megawatts of generation capacity had been relocated.

== Acquisition by the Ugandan government ==
In November 2023, the Ugandan ministry of finance and economic planning began making preparations to acquire the 50 MW Electromaxx Generation Plant at Tororo. An advance payment of US$7 million (USh:26 billion) was authorized, conditioned upon amendment of the power purchase agreement and the implementation agreement. The purchase deal was brokered by Evelyn Anite, Ugandan state minister for privatization.

== See also ==
- Tororo Solar Power Station
- List of power stations in Uganda
