= Kikagati Hydroelectric Power Station =

Kikagati Power Station
- Map of Uganda showing the location of Kikagati Power Station
- Country: Uganda
- Location: Kikagati, Isingiro District
- Coordinates: 01°03′27″S 30°39′33″E
- Purpose: Power
- Status: Operational
- Construction began: 2018
- Opening date: January 2022
- Construction cost: US$87 million
- Owner: Kikagati Power Company Limited

Dam and spillways
- Impounds: Kagera River

Reservoir
- Normal elevation: 1,300 m (4,300 ft)

Power Station
- Commission date: January 2022
- Turbines: Voith: 3 x 5.19MW
- Installed capacity: 15.57 MW (20,880 hp)
- Annual generation: 115 GWh

Kikagati Hydroelectric Power Station, also referred to as Kikagati Power Station, is a 15.57 MW (20,880 hp) hydroelectric power station, in Uganda.

== Location ==
The power station is located across the Kagera River, along Uganda's International border with the United Republic of Tanzania. This location lies near the town of Kikagati, approximately 75 kilometres (47 mi), by road, south of Mbarara, the largest city in the sub-region. Kikagati lies approximately 331 kilometres (206 mi), by road, southwest of Kampala, the capital of Uganda and the largest city in that country. The geographical coordinates of the power station are 01°03'27.0"S, 30°39'33.0"E (Latitude:-1.057500; Longitude:30.659167).

== Overview ==
Kikagati Power Station is a mini-hydropower plant, with initial planned capacity installation of 10 MW (13,000 hp). The project involved the construction of a dam, creating a 4,000 square metres (0.99 acres) reservoir lake. The new reservoir lies partly within Tanzania. The new power station was built at the location of another smaller power station that was destroyed in 1979 during the war that removed Idi Amin from power in Uganda.

In September 2011, the planned capacity installation was increased to 16.5 MW. This power project received partial funding from the Uganda GetFit Program.

== Development rights ==
Initially, the Chinese company China Shan Sheng, was issued the construction license for the project in 2008. At that time, construction costs were estimated at US$25 million. The 33kV transmission line that connects the power from the station to the Uganda national electricity grid was constructed and completed ahead of station commissioning. Some of the power is sold to Tanzania, under arrangements made through the East African Community.

Between 2008 and 2013, the Chinese pulled out of the deal. Development rights were taken up by TrønderEnergi, a Norwegian power company, with a Ugandan subsidiary Tronder Energy Limited. In July 2013, TronderEnergi advertised for suitable firms to bid on the construction of Kikagati Power Station. Bids were also sought on the nearby Nshungyezi Hydropower Station, a proposed 39 MW (52,000 hp) minihydroplant, approximately 13 kilometres (8.1 mi), downstream of Kikagati, on which TronderEnergi has development rights as well.

== Construction timetable ==
Kikagati Power Station was awarded a production license by the Electricity Regulatory Authority (ERA), in October 2014. SBI International AG was awarded the construction contract. The construction cost was reported at US$50 million, in 2018. Construction started in February 2018, with commissioning planned for the first half of 2021. In March 2019, the project received a total of US$27 million in funding from the Emerging Africa Infrastructure Fund (EAIF) and the Private Infrastructure Development Group (PIDG). An equal amount of funding (50 percent) was provided by FMO (Netherlands). The project also benefitted from the KfW-funded GET-FiT program. In August 2019, Afrik21 reported that the project had reached financial close at that time.

In January 2022, Voith Hydro completed the installation of three turbines, each rated at 5.19 MW, for total generation capacity of 15.57 MW, to be sold directly to the Uganda Electricity Transmission Company Limited (UETCL), via a 33kV evacuation line. UETCL, in turn, sells half of the power station's energy to Tanzania Electric Supply Company Limited (TANESCO). The total construction cost was reported as US$87 million. A 33kV medium voltage evacuation line transmits the generated energy to a point where it enters the Ugandan electricity grid.

== Funding ==
Kikagati HPP received funding from a number of funding sources including: (a) Netherlands Development Finance Corporation (FMO) (b) Africa Renewable Energy Fund (c) Emerging Africa Infrastructure Fund (EAIF) and (d) Private Infrastructure Development Group (PIDG). All loans are to be repaid within 16 years, from date of commercial commissioning.

== See also ==
- Western Uganda
- Uganda Power Stations
