= Kyambura Hydroelectric Power Station =

Ugandan power station

- Map of Uganda showing the location of Kyambura. Kyambura Hydroelectric Power Station (Africa) Kyambura Hydroelectric Power Station (Earth)
- Country: Uganda
- Location: Kyambura, Rubirizi District
- Coordinates: 00°12′39″S 30°07′04″E
- Purpose: Power
- Status: Operational
- Construction began: 2017
- Opening date: 1 August 2019
- Construction cost: US$24 million

Dam and spillways
- Impounds: Kyambura River

Power Station
- Turbines: 2 x 3.8 MW
- Installed capacity: 7.6 megawatts (10,200 hp)
- Annual generation: 36.7 GWh

Kyambura Hydroelectric Power Station, commonly referred to as Kyambura Power Station, is a 7.6 megawatts (10,200 hp) mini hydroelectric power station in Uganda.

== Location ==
The power station is located in the Kyambura area, across the Kyambura River, in Kiruggu subcounty, Rubirizi District, approximately 10.5 kilometres (7 mi), north of the town of Rubirizi, where the district headquarters are located. This is approximately 107.5 kilometres (67 mi), by road, northwest of Mbarara, the largest city in the Western Region of Uganda. The geographical coordinates of the power station are: 00°12'39.0"S, 30°07'04.0"E (Latitude:-0.210833; Longitude:30.117778).

== Overview ==
The power station is a run-of-river installation with generation capacity of 7.6 megawatts (10,200 hp) and annual production of 36.7 GWh. The original design had the main intake via a "headrace tunnel". In the new design, that has been replaced by a "headrace canal". This has reduced project costs and construction time. The budgeted cost of construction is US$24 million.

== Construction timeline ==
Construction began in early 2017 and commissioning was effected in the second half of 2019. Three Sri Lankan civil contractors; KSJ Construction, SSP Engineers and Sanken Overseas Limited were actively engaged on the project. Construction was completed and synchronization tests to the national grid concluded in July 2019. Commercial output commenced in August 2019.

== GET-Fit Uganda Program ==
This power station benefited from the GET-Fit Uganda Program, administered by KfW. Kyambura Hydroelectric Power Station received US$2.4 million in GET-Fit funding, out of the US$24 million construction costs.

== See also ==
- Africa Dams
- Uganda Power Stations
