= Kinyara Thermal Power Station =

Thermal power plant in Uganda

Kinyara Power Station
- Country: Uganda
- Location: Kinyara, Masindi, Masindi District
- Coordinates: 01°38′12″N 31°36′24″E
- Status: Operational
- Commission date: 2009
- Owner: Kinyara Sugar Works

Thermal power station
- Primary fuel: Bagasse
- Cogeneration?: Yes

Power generation
- Units operational: 40.8 MW (3 x 13.6 MW)
- Nameplate capacity: 40.8 MW

Kinyara Power Station is a 40.8 MW bagasse-fired thermal power plant in Uganda, the fourth-largest economy in the East African Community.

== Location ==
The power station is located in the town of Kinyara in Masindi District in the Western Region of Uganda, on the campus of Kinyara Sugar Limited, which owns the station. Kinyara is approximately 15 kilometres (9.3 mi), by road, west of Masindi, the nearest large town. This location is approximately 230 kilometres (140 mi), by road, northwest of Kampala, the capital of Uganda and the largest city in that country. The coordinates of the station are:1°38'12.0"N, 31°36'24.0"E (Latitude:1.636667; Longitude:31.606667).

== Overview ==
Kinyara Power Station is owned and operated by Kinyara Sugar Limited, the second-largest sugar manufacturer in Uganda. The power station was designed and built around the sugar manufacturing plant of Kinyara Sugar Ltd. The fibrous residue from the process of crushing sugar cane, known as bagasse, is burnt to heat water in boilers and produce steam. The steam is pressurized and used to drive turbines which then generate electricity. The excess heat is used in the sugar manufacturing process. As of September 2009, the power station was capable of producing a maximum of 14.5MW of electricity. As of October 2009, the power station sold 4MW to the national grid. Plans are underway to expand power production to 40MW by 2015. Of this, 22MW was expected to be sold to the national grid and the rest used by the sugar manufacturing complex at Kinyara.

== See also ==
- List of sugar manufacturers in Uganda
- List of power stations in Uganda
