= Lugazi Thermal Power Station =

Power station in Uganda

Lugazi Power Station
- Country: Uganda
- Location: Lugazi, Buikwe District
- Coordinates: 00°22′48″N 32°56′42″E
- Status: Operational
- Commission date: 1998
- Owner: Sugar Corporation of Uganda Limited

Thermal power station
- Primary fuel: Bagasse

Power generation
- Units operational: 2 x 4.25 MW
- Nameplate capacity: 9.5 megawatts (12,700 hp)

Lugazi Power Station is a 9.5 megawatts (12,700 hp) bagasse-fired thermal power plant in Uganda, the third-largest economy in the East African Community.

== Location ==
The power station is located on the campus of Sugar Corporation of Uganda Limited, the owners of the power station. This is located in the town of Lugazi, in Buikwe District, in Central Uganda. Lugazi lies approximately 47 kilometres (29 mi), along the Kampala-Jinja Highway, east of Kampala, the capital of Uganda and the largest city in that country. The coordinates of the power station are:0°22'48.0"N, 32°56'42.0"E (Latitude:0.3800; Longitude:32.9450).

== Overview ==
Lugazi Power Station is owned and operated by Sugar Corporation of Uganda Limited (SCOUL), the third-largest sugar manufacturer in Uganda. The power station was designed and built around the sugar manufacturing plant of SCOUL. The fibrous residue from the process of crushing sugar cane, known as bagasse, is burnt to heat water in boilers and produce steam. The steam is pressurized and used to drive turbines which then generate electricity. The excess heat is used in the sugar manufacturing process. As of December 2010, the power station was capable of producing a maximum of 5 MW of electricity, which was fully utilized internally by SCOUL. At that time, plans were underway to expand power production to 16 MW, of which 7.4 MW was to be sold to the grid and the remaining 8.6 was for internal use by SCOUL.

== Upgrade ==
In May 2018, SCOUL borrowed €20 million from PROPARCO and another €20 million from Netherlands Development Finance Company (FMO), to finance a new 26 megawatts (35,000 hp) bagasse co-generation power plant.

== See also ==
- Lugazi
- Buikwe District
- SCOUL
- Mehta Group
- Uganda Power Stations
