= Tororo Solar Power Station =

Power station in Tororo, Uganda

- Country: Uganda
- Location: Tororo, Tororo District
- Coordinates: 00°37′50″N 34°06′40″E
- Status: Operational
- Construction began: 14 December 2016
- Commission date: 16 October 2017
- Owner: Tororo Solar North Limited

Solar farm
- Type: Flat-panel PV

Power generation
- Nameplate capacity: 10 megawatts (13,000 hp)

Tororo Solar Power Station, also Tororo Solar North Power Station, is a 10 megawatts (13,000 hp) solar power plant in Uganda, the third-largest economy in the East African Community.

== Location ==
The power station is located in Tororo District, approximately 12 kilometres (7 mi), by road, southwest of the town of Tororo in the Eastern Region of Uganda. This is approximately 230 kilometres (143 mi) by road, east of Kampala, the country's capital and largest city. The geographical coordinates of Tororo Solar Power Station are 0°37'50.0"N, 34°06'40.0"E (Latitude:0.630556; Longitude:34.111111).

== Overview ==
The power station has a capacity of 10 megawatts, sold directly to the Uganda Electricity Transmission Company Limited for integration in the national electricity grid. The electricity is evacuated via a substation near the power station. The energy generated will power approximately 40,000 homes, located near the power station, thus minimizing transmission losses.

== Developers ==
The power station was developed by a special purpose vehicle company, "Tororo Solar North Limited', specifically set up to develop, build and operate this solar power station. Tororo Solar is majority owned by Building Energy SpA, an International developer of renewable power sources, with headquarters in Milan, Italy. Other owners in the consortium include the Ugandan "Simba Group". The Simba Group also owns Electromaxx Limited, the owner-operator of the 70 megawatt Tororo Thermal Power Station, commissioned in 2010. The power generated at this power station is expected to serve an estimated 170,600 people.

== Construction timeline, costs and funding ==
The cost of construction was budgeted at US$19.6 million, of which the owners contributed US$4.9 million. The remaining US$14.7 million was borrowed from Netherlands Development Finance Company (FMO). Fifty percent of the FMO loan was syndicated from the Emerging Africa Infrastructure Fund (EAIF), which is substantially funded by the governments of the United Kingdom, The Netherlands, Sweden and Switzerland and by the German development finance institution, KFW and its Dutch equivalent, FMO. The project is a beneficiary of the GETFit Uganda program led by KfW, receiving grant support from (amongst other contributors) the EU-Africa Infrastructure Trust Fund (EU-AITF). Construction began on 14 December 2016, and commissioning was performed on 16 October 2017.

== See also ==
- List of power stations in Uganda
- Soroti Solar Power Station
- Ituka Solar Power Station
