= Nkusi River =

River in the Western Region of Uganda

Nkusi
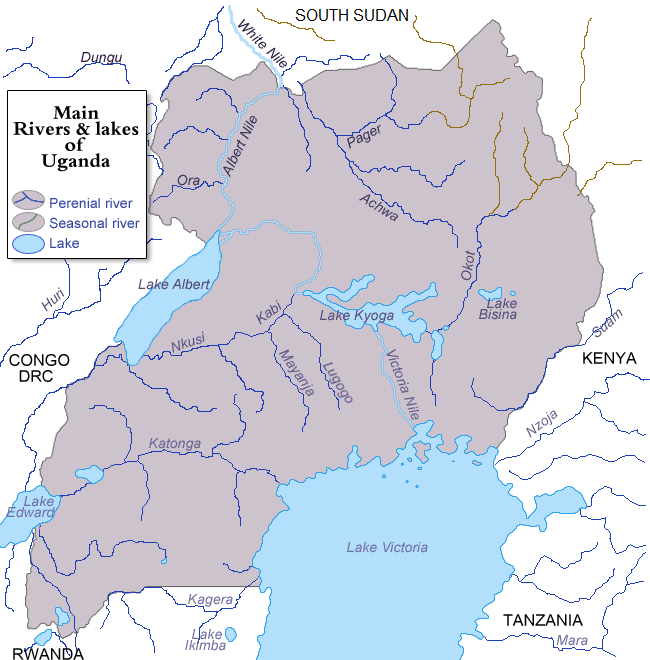

Location
- Country: Uganda

Physical characteristics
- Source: Kakumiro Hills, Kibaale District
  - location: Kakumiro, Western Region, Uganda
  - coordinates: 00°47′44″N 31°13′08″E
  - elevation: 1,334 m (4,377 ft)
- Mouth: Lake Albert, Kibaale District
  - location: Kigwabya, Western Region, Uganda
  - coordinates: 01°07′18″N 30°40′01″E
  - elevation: 616 m (2,021 ft)
- Length: 160 km (99 mi)

The Nkusi River is in the Bunyoro sub-region, in the Western Region of Uganda.

== Location ==
The Nkusi River begins in the hills west of the town of Kakumiro in the Kakumiro District. It flows in a north-westerly direction to enter a swamp near the village of Kitoma, in the Kibaale District. The river emerges from this swamp and flows westwards to empty into Lake Albert at the border with the Democratic Republic of the Congo.

In the swamp near Kitoma, the Nkusi River briefly joins the River Kafu. The River Kafu, however, flows out of the swamp in a north-easterly direction and finally empties into the Victoria Nile, near the town of Masindi Port in Masindi District.

The source of the Nkusi River is in Kakumiro at Latitude 0.7955 N, Longitude 31.2190 E. The river enters Lake Albert at Kigwabya in Kibaale District at Latitude 1.1195 N, Longitude 30.6670 E. At its source, the altitude is approximately 1,334 metres (4,377 ft). At its point of entry into Lake Albert, the altitude is approximately 616 metres (2,021 ft).

The length of the river is approximately 160 kilometres (99 mi).

== See also ==
- Kibale National Park
