= Kabalega Hydroelectric Power Station =

Hydroelectric power station in Uganda

- Country: Uganda
- Location: Hoima
- Coordinates: 01°32′42″N 31°06′41″E
- Status: Operational
- Commission date: January 2013

Power generation
- Units operational: 3
- Nameplate capacity: 9 MW (12,000 hp)

Kabalega Hydroelectric Power Station, also known as Kabalega Power Station, is a 9 MW (12,000 hp) mini hydroelectric power project located across River Wambabya, in Buseruka Sub County, Hoima District, in Western Uganda. At the beginning of planning and during construction, the power station was referred to as Buseruka Power Station, but was renamed after completion.

== Location ==
The power station is located in Buseruka Village, close to the eastern shores of Lake Albert. Buseruka is located approximately 37 kilometres (23 mi), by road, west of Hoima.

== Construction costs ==
The initial estimated cost for the dam and power plant was approximately US$30 million. As time went on, that estimate was increased to US$36 million. The dam, power plant and 44 kilometres (27 mi) of high voltage transmission line from the power house to Kinubi Power Substation in Hoima, are being constructed by Hydromax, a private energy investor. Funding for the project is facilitated by loans from the African Development Bank (US$9 million) and from the PTA Bank (US$10 million).

== Completion ==
Construction, which started in 2005, was completed in January 2013 and was commissioned by the president of Uganda, Yoweri Museveni, on 26 January 2013. At that time, the high voltage line which will evacuate the power generated to a substation that will integrate into the national grid, was yet to be completed.

== See also ==
- List of power stations in Uganda
- List of hydropower stations in Africa
- List of hydroelectric power stations
