= Nshungyezi Hydroelectric Power Station =

- Map of Uganda showing the location of Nshyungyezi
- Country: Uganda
- Location: Nshungyezi, Isingiro District
- Coordinates: 01°00′04″S 30°44′38″E
- Status: Proposed
- Owner: Nsongezi Power Company Limited

Dam and spillways
- Impounds: Kagera River

Reservoir
- Normal elevation: 1,300 m (4,300 ft)

Power Station
- Commission date: TBD
- Type: Run-of-the-river
- Installed capacity: 39 MW (52,000 hp)

Nshyungyezi Hydroelectric Power Station, also Nsongezi Hydroelectric Power Station, is a planned 39 megawatts (52,000 hp) hydroelectric power station in Uganda. The power project is under development, as of September 2017.

== Location ==
The power station would be located on the Kagera River, along Uganda's International border with the Republic of Tanzania. This location lies near the village of Nshugyezi, approximately 59 kilometres (37 mi), by road, southeast of Mbarara, the largest city in the Western Region of Uganda. This location lies approximately 328 kilometres (204 mi), by road, southwest of Kampala, the capital of Uganda and the largest city in that country. The power station lies approximately 13 kilometres (8.1 mi), downstream of Kikagati Power Station, as the crow flies, and about 16 kilometres (9.9 mi) by road.

== Overview ==
Nshugyezi Hydropower Station is a mini-hydropower plant, with a planned capacity of 39 megawatts. TronderEnergi, through its Ugandan subsidiary Tronder Energy Limited, used to own the development rights to the project, together with development rights to Kikagati Power Station, located about 13 kilometres (8.1 mi), upstream of Nshungyezi. As of May 2015 feasibility studies were ongoing and a search for a suitable contractor was underway.

== Construction costs ==
As at December 2017, the exact construction costs were unknown. This project has received partial funding from Norfund.

== Ownership ==
In July 2015, the development rights for this power project were transferred to Maji Power Limited, the Ugandan subsidiary of Berkeley Energy. Also, Norfund's share in the Kikagati and Nshugyezi project companies was reduced to 30 percent.

== See also ==
- Uganda Power Stations
- Africa Dams
