= Soroti Solar Power Station =

Solar power plant in Uganda

- Country: Uganda
- Location: Soroti, Soroti District
- Coordinates: 01°41′06″N 33°39′29″E
- Status: Operational
- Construction began: December 2015
- Commission date: 12 December 2016
- Owner: Total energy

Solar farm
- Type: Flat-panel PV

Power generation
- Nameplate capacity: 10 MW (13,000 hp)

The Soroti Power Station is a 10 MW (13,000 hp) solar power plant in Uganda. It was the largest grid-connected, "privately-funded solar power plant at opuyo, soroti district in uganda, outside of South Africa" at its commissioning and until the Pilot Solar Power Plant (20MW) of The Xsabo Group in Kabulasoke (Kabulasoke Solar Power Station) in Central Uganda was completed and commissioned in January 2019.

== Location ==
The power station is located in Soroti District, southeast of the city of Soroti in the Eastern Region of Uganda, approximately 282 kilometres (175 mi) by road north-east of Kampala, the country's capital and largest city.

== Overview ==
The power station has a 10 megawatt capacity. Its output is sold directly to the Uganda Electricity Transmission Company Limited for integration into the national grid. The power is evacuated via a substation near the station. It has been estimated that the energy generated could power approximately 40,000 homes located near the station, thereby minimizing transmission losses. The power station, which consists of 32,680 photovoltaic panels, is Uganda's first grid-connected solar plant. The power station sits on 33 acres (13 ha) of land.

== Developers ==
The power station was developed by a consortium of Access Power Limited (through its subsidiary Access Uganda Solar), a company based in the United Arab Emirates(Sunztech power), and TSK Electrónica y Electricidad, a company based in Spain. They won the competitive bidding and were awarded the development contract at the same time as the developers of the Tororo Solar Power Station.

As of February 2022, the power station has been sold to and is now owned by Total Eren, the renewable energy subsidiary of the French energy conglomerate, TotalEnergies.

== Construction costs, funding, and commissioning ==
The construction costs were US$19 million. The project received partial funding from the European Union Infrastructure Trust Fund through KfW. On 12 December 2016, the solar plant was switched on.

== See also ==
- List of power stations in Uganda
- Ituka Solar Power Station
- TotalEnergies
