= List of power stations in Uganda =

Power stations in Uganda

This article lists all power stations in Uganda. As of September 2024, Uganda's installed national generation capacity was 2,048.1 MW of electricity.

== Hydroelectric ==
=== Completed ===
Hydroelectric power station	Community	Coordinates	River	Type	Name of reservoir	Capacity (megawatts)	Year completed
Achwa 1 Hydroelectric Power Station	Achwa, Gulu District	3.148056°N 32.514167°E	River Acwa	Run of river	N/A	41.0	2021
Bugoye Power Station	Bugoye, Kasese District	0.3000°N 30.1005°E	River Mubuku	Run of river	N/A	13	2009
Bujagali Power Station	Bujagali, Buikwe District	0.4975°N 33.1400°E	River Nile	Run of river	N/A	250	2012
Kabalega Power Station	Buseruka, Hoima District	1.5450°N 31.1115°E	River Wambabya	Reservoir	Buseruka Reservoir	9	2013
Kanungu Hydroelectric Power Station	Kanungu, Kanungu District	0.881397°S 29.670823°E	River Ishasha	Run of river	N/A	6.6	2011
Kiira Power Station	Jinja, Jinja District	0.4506°N 33.1858°E	River Nile	Reservoir	Lake Victoria	200	2000
Mpanga Power Station	Mpanga, Kitagwenda District	0.0810°N 30.3810°E	River Mpanga	Run of river	N/A	18	2011
Mubuku I Power Station	Kitoko, Kasese District	0.318610°N 30.100000°E	River Mubuku	Run of river	N/A	5	1950s
Mubuku III Power Station	Mubuku, Kasese District	0.263340°N 30.120000°E	River Mubuku	Run of river	N/A	10	2009
Nalubaale Power Station	Njeru, Buikwe District	0.443611°N 33.185°E	River Nile	Reservoir	Lake Victoria	180	1954
Nyagak Power Station	Paidha, Zombo District	2.4310°N 30.9745°E	River Nyagak	Run of river	N/A	3.5	2012
Nyamagasani I Hydroelectric Power Station	Kyarumba, Kasese District	0.137778°N 29.934722°E	River Nyamasagani	Run of river	N/A	15.0	2021
Nyamagasani II Hydroelectric Power Station	Kyarumba, Kasese District	0.130000°N 29.942500°E	River Nyamasagani	Run of river	N/A	5.0	2021
Kisiizi Power Station	Kisiizi, Rukungiri District	0.9956°S 29.9625°E	River Kisiizi	Run of river	N/A	0.3	2008
Gwere-Luzira Power Station	Gwere-Luzira, Moyo District	3.6700°N 31.7810°E	River Amoa	Run of river	N/A	0.0005 (0.5 kilowatts)	2009
Siti I Hydroelectric Power Station	Siti, Bukwo District	1.250000°N 34.636945°E	River Siti	Run of river	N/A	6.1	2017
Muvumbe Power Station	Maziba, Kabale District	1.3186°S 30.0789°E	River Maziba	Run of river	N/A	6.5	2017
Rwimi Power Station	Rwimi, Bunyangabu District	0.3861°N 30.1853°E	River Rwimi	Run of river	N/A	5.6	2017
Siti II Hydroelectric Power Station	Chesowari, Bukwo District	1.276389°N 34.657778°E	River Siti	Run of river	N/A	16.5	2019
Isimba Power Station	Isimba, Kamuli District	0.9400°N 32.9650°E	River Nile	Run of river	N/A	183.2	2019
Mahoma Power Station	Mahoma, Kabarole District	0.478611°N 30.273056°E	River Mahoma	Run of river	N/A	3.0	2018
Nyamwamba Power Station	Kilembe, Kasese District	0.2300°N 29.9850°E	River Nyamwamba	Run of river	N/A	9.2	2018
Nkusi Power Station	Kyangwali, Hoima District	0.119444°N 30.66856°E	River Nkusi	Run of river	N/A	9.6	2018
Lubilia Power Station	Kawembe, Kasese District	0.083611°N 29.761944°E	River Lubilia	Run of river	N/A	5.4	2018
Waki Power Station	Butiaba, Masindi District	1.7660°N 31.3660°E	River Waki	Run of river	N/A	4.8	2018
Achwa 2 Hydroelectric Power Station	Gulu District	3.1350°N 32.5208°E	Achwa River	Run of river	N/A	42	2019
Kyambura Hydroelectric Power Station	Rubirizi District	0.148889°N 30.088611°E	Kyambura River	Run of river	N/A	7.6	2019
Ndugutu Hydroelectric Power Station	Bundibugyo District	0.615556°N 29.979444°E	Ndugutu River	Run of river	N/A	5.9	2019
Sindila Hydroelectric Power Station	Bundibugyo District	0.630000°N 29.978056°E	Sindila River	Run of river	N/A	5.3	2019
Kikagati Hydroelectric Power Station	Isingiro District	1.042500°N 30.669444°E	Kagera River	Run of river	N/A	16.0	2022
Karuma Power Station	Karuma, Kiryandongo District	2.2430°N 32.2450°E	River Nile	Run of river	N/A	600	2024
Nyagak III Power Station	Paidha, Zombo District	2.4500°N 30.9800°E	River NyagakIII	Run of river	N/A	6.6	2025

=== Proposed ===
Hydroelectric power station	Community	Coordinates	River	Type	Name of reservoir	Capacity (megawatts)	Completion expected
Achwa 3 Hydroelectric Power Station	Achwa, Gulu District	3.018622°N 32.548332°E	Achwa River	Run of river	N/A	10	2022
Agbinika Power Station	Yumbe, Yumbe District	3.5000°N 31.1200°E	Kochi River	Run of river	N/A	20	2025
Ayago Power Station	Ayago, Nwoya District	2.3630°N 31.9200°E	River Nile	Run of river	N/A	880	2025
Muzizi Power Station	Ndaiga, Hoima District	0.9650°N 30.5450°E	River Muzizi	Run of river	N/A	44.7	2021
Nengo Bridge Hydropower Station	Nengo Rukungiri District	0.815000°S 29.833333°E	River Mirera	Run of river	N/A	6.7	2022
Nyagak II Power Station	Paidha, Zombo District	2.5000°N 30.9900°E	River Nyagak	Run of river	N/A	5	2023
Nshungyezi Power Station	Nshungyezi, Isingiro District	1.0000°S 30.7450°E	River Kagera	Run of river	N/A	39	2025

== Thermal ==
=== Completed ===
Thermal power station	Community	Coordinates	Fuel type	Capacity (megawatts)	Year completed	Owner	Notes
Bugala Thermal Power Station	Kalangala, Bugala Island	0.3100°S 32.2150°E	Biodiesel	1.5	2010	Bidco	
Namanve Thermal Power Station	Namanve, Mukono Municipality	0.3440°N 32.7015°E	Fuel oil	50	2008	UEGCL	Preserved for use during peak hour demands.
Tororo Thermal Power Station	Tororo	0.6375°N 34.1180°E	Biodiesel, fuel oil, crude oil	80	2010	Electro-Maxx	
Kakira Thermal Power Station	Kakira, Jinja District	0.5089°N 33.2900°E	Bagasse	52	2005	Madhvani Group	Upgraded to 52 megawatts during 2013
Kinyara Thermal Power Station	Kinyara, Masindi	1.6355°N 31.6055°E	Bagasse	40	2009	Kinyara Sugar Works Limited	Capacity in 2009 was 14.5 megawatts. Power station under expansion to 40 megawatts capacity by 2015.
Kaliro Thermal Power Station	Buwaya, Kaliro District	0.947217°N 33.486939°E	Bagasse	12	2014	Sugar & Allied Industries Limited	
Lugazi Thermal Power Station	Lugazi, Buikwe District	0.3800°N 32.9450°E	Bagasse	14	2007	Sugar Corporation of Uganda Limited	
Mayuge Thermal Power Station	Mayuge, Mayuge District	0.503611°N 33.411348°E	Bagasse	1.6	2005	Mayuge Sugar Industries Limited	In April 2014, the owners applied for license to expand to 21-23 megawatts.

=== Proposed ===
Thermal power station	Community	Coordinates	Fuel type	Capacity (megawatts)	Completion expected	Owner	Notes
Nzizi Thermal Power Station	Nzizi; Hoima District	1.5000°N 30.9300°E	Natural gas, heavy fuel oil	100	2023	Tullow Oil Plc. & Jacobsen Elektro	
Osukuru Thermal Power Station	Osukuru; Tororo District	0.632209°N 34.158321°E	Peat, heavy fuel oil	12	2020	Guangzhou Dongsong Energy Group	

== Hybrid ==
Hybrid power station	Community	Coordinates	Fuel types	Capacity (megawatts)	Year completed	Owner	Notes
Bukuzindu Hybrid Solar and Thermal Power Station	Bukuzindu; Kalangala District	0.306944°S 32.152500°E	Solar power & diesel fuel	1.6	2014	KIS & Uganda Development Corporation	

== Solar ==
=== Completed ===
Solar power station	Community	Coordinates	Fuel type	Capacity (megawatts)	Year completed	Owner	Notes
Soroti Solar Power Station	Soroti District	1.700278°N 33.659167°E	Solar	10	2016	Total Eren	
Tororo Solar Power Station	Tororo District	0.638889°N 34.119167°E	Solar	10	2017	Simba Telecoms Limited, Building Energy SpA	
Kabulasoke Solar Power Station	Kabulasoke, Gomba District	0.162500°N 31.794722°E	Solar	20	2019	Xsabo Power Limited	
Mayuge Solar Power Station	Bufulubi, Mayuge District	0.495000°N 33.407500°E	Solar	10	2019	Tryba Energy	
Busitema Solar Power Station	Busitema, Busia District	0.547222°N 34.023611°E	Solar	4	2022	Government of Uganda	

=== Proposed ===
Solar power station	Community	Coordinates	Fuel type	Capacity (megawatts)	Year completed	Owner	Notes
Namugoga Solar Power Station	Wakiso District	0.172778°N 32.568056°E	Solar	50		Solar Energy for Africa, Naanovo Energy Inc.	
Nkonge Solar Power Station	Mubende District	0.620556°N 31.828611°E	Solar	50		The Xsabo Group	License issued 28 September 2020
Ituka Solar Power Station	Madi Okollo District	2.772222°N 31.038889°E	Solar	20		AMEA Power	

== Geothermal ==
=== Proposed ===
Geothermal power station	Community	Coordinates	Fuel type	Capacity (megawatts)	Year completed	Owner	Notes
Buranga Geothermal Power Station	Bundibugyo District	0.833062°N 30.166947°E	GT energy	100	2020 (expected)	GIDS	
Katwe Geothermal Power Station	Lake Katwe; Kasese District	0.1450°S 29.8900°E	GT energy	150	To be determined	AAE Systems Inc. & Katwe Geothermal Limited	

== See also ==
- Energy in Uganda
