= Uganda Electricity Transmission Company Limited =

Parastatal company which supplies electricity in Uganda

Coordinates: 00°19′13″N 32°35′12.5″E

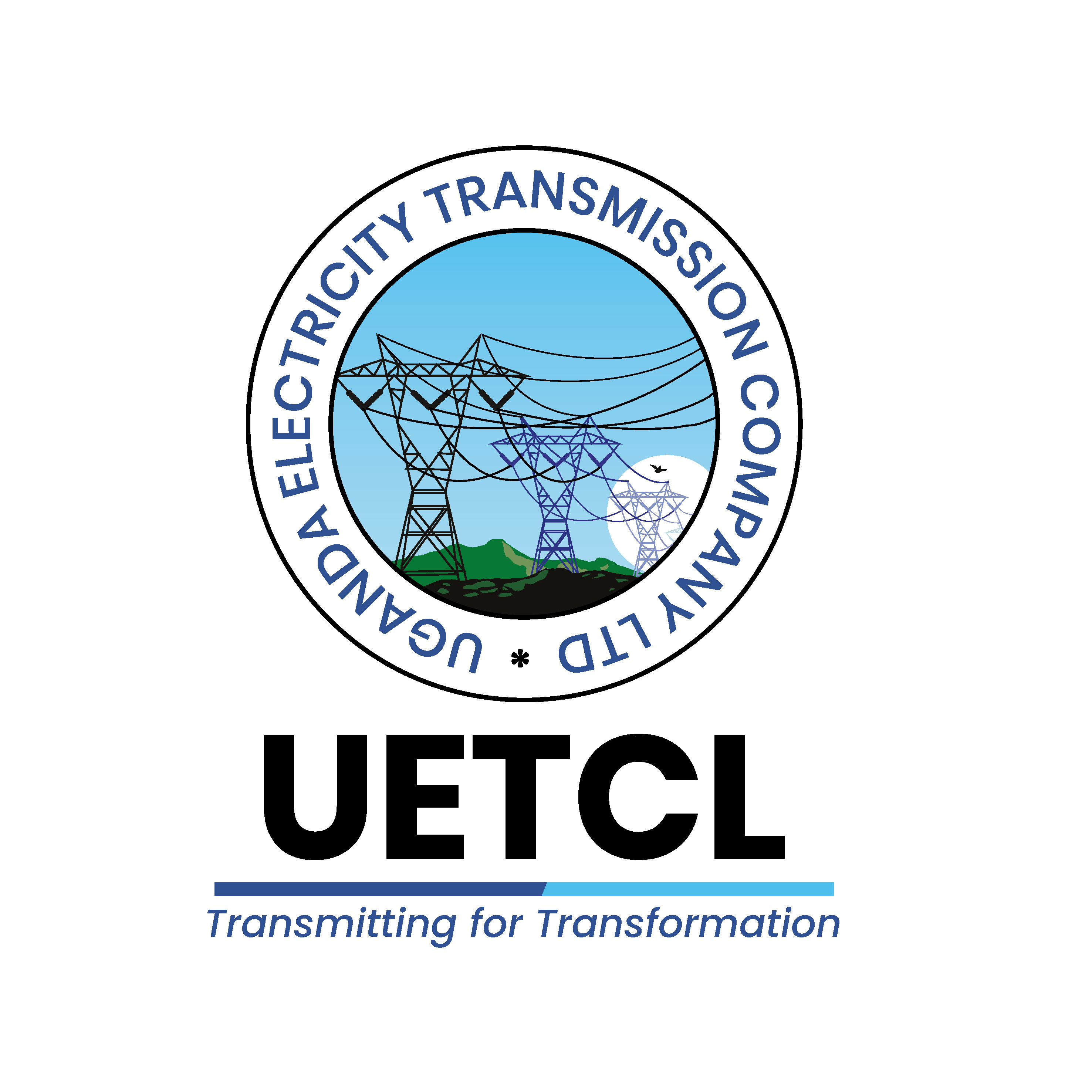

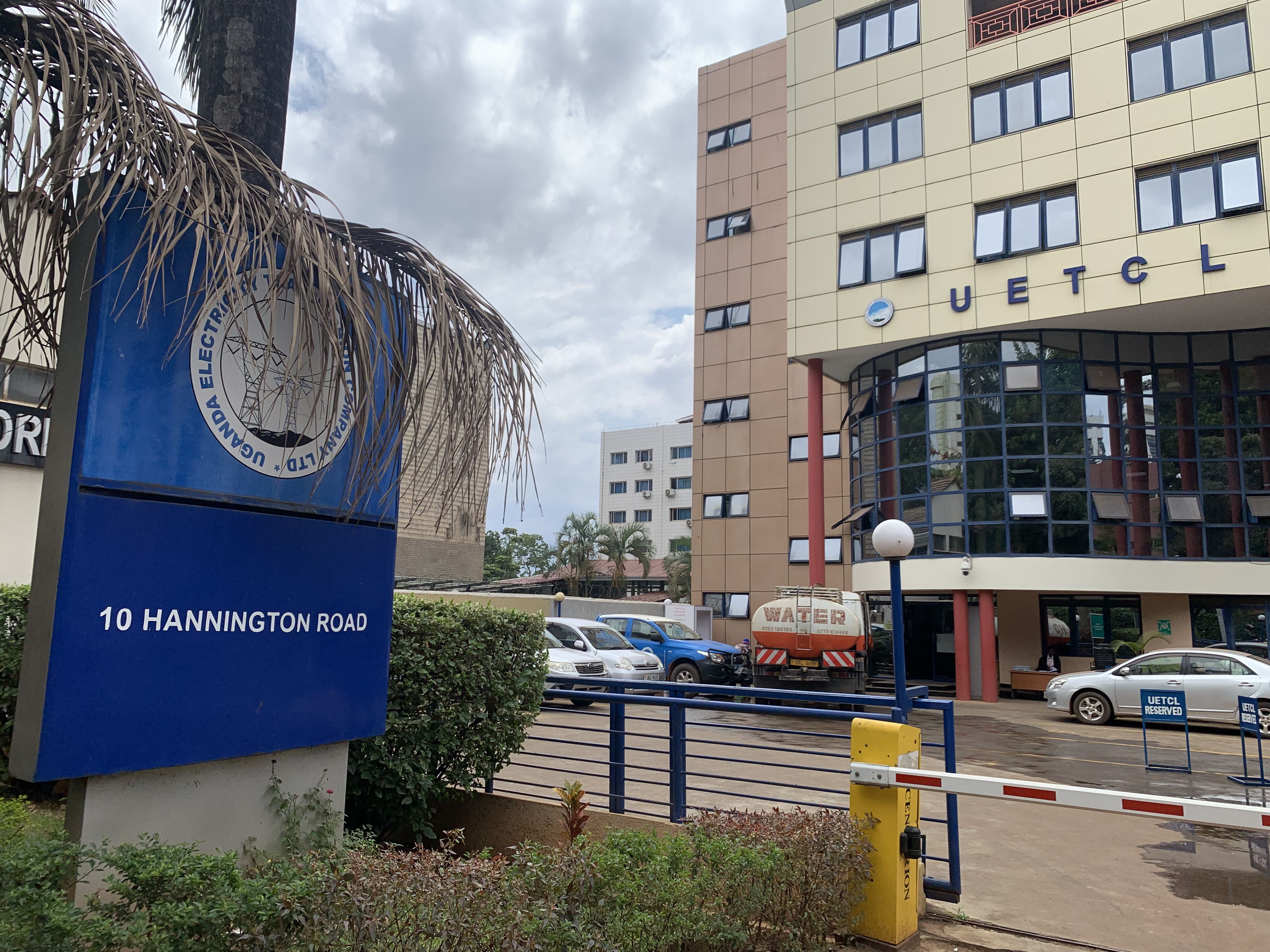
- UETCL Head Office located on Plot 10 Hannington Road.
- Type: Parastatal
- Industry: Power Transmission
- Founded: March 26, 2001; 25 years ago
- Headquarters: Plot No.10, Hannington Road, Nakasero; Kampala, Uganda
- Key people: Kwame Ejalu (Chairman); Richard Matsiko (Chief Executive Officer)
- Products: Electricity Transmission
- Number of employees: 500 (2023)
- Website: Homepage

The Uganda Electricity Transmission Company Limited (UETCL) is a parastatal company whose primary purpose is to make bulk electricity purchases and transmit the electricity along high-voltage wires to local and foreign distribution points. The company is the sole authorized national bulk energy purchaser and the sole authorized electricity importer and exporter in Uganda.

== Location ==
The company's headquarters are on Plot No.10, Hannington Road, Nakasero, in Kampala, Uganda's capital and largest city.

== History ==
The company was incorporated as a limited company on 26 March 2001 by an act of the Ugandan parliament following the break-up of the defunct Uganda Electricity Board.

== Operations ==
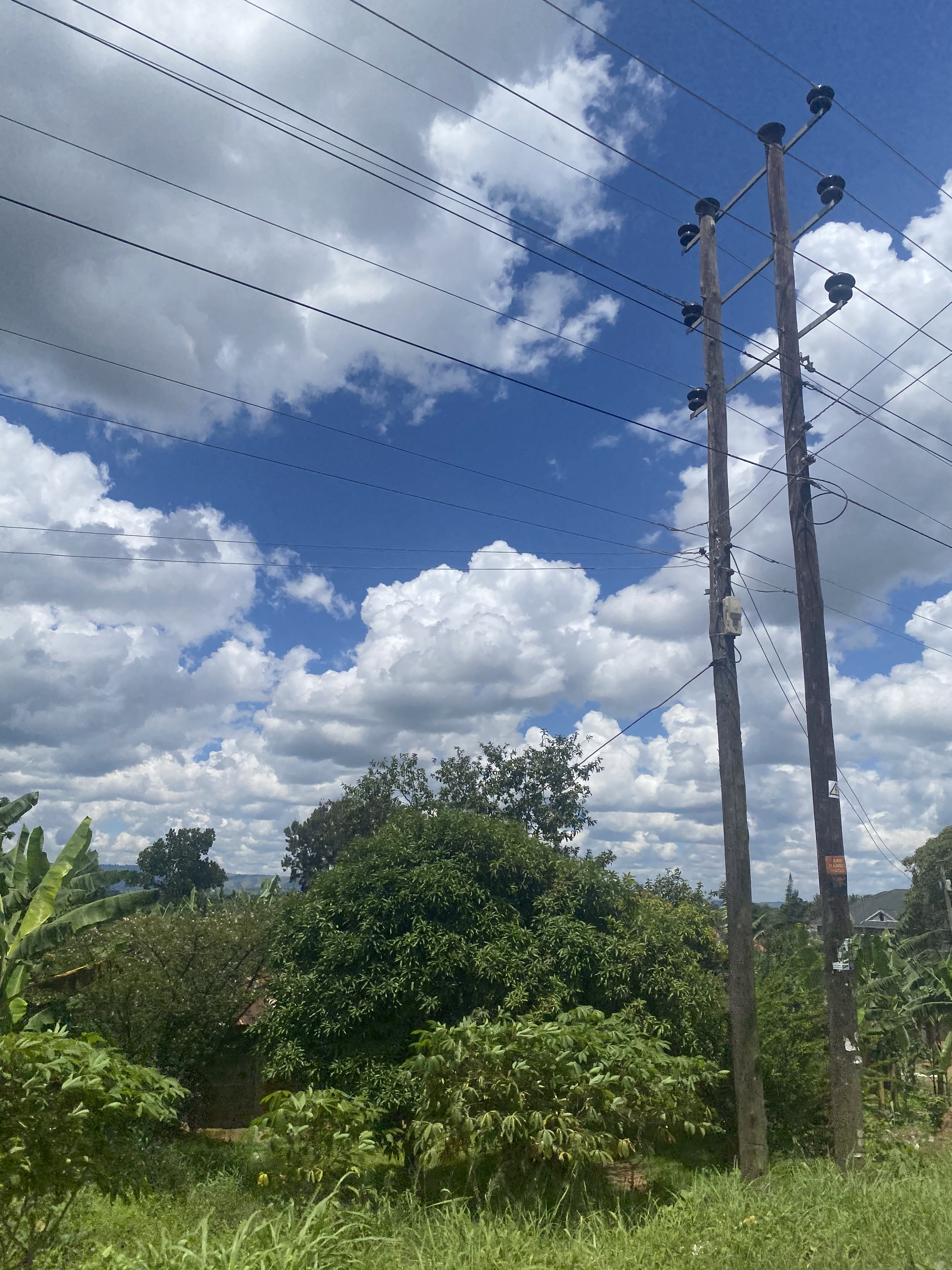
Electricity wires in Kamukuzi division in Western Uganda

UETCL is responsible for the development, operations, maintenance, and improvement of the high-voltage power transmission lines, above 33kV, in Uganda. It also owns and operates the high-voltage substations (above 33kV), around the country. UETCL is wholly owned by the Ministry of Finance, Planning and Economic Development and is regulated by the Ugandan Ministry of Energy & Mineral Development.

== Power loss reduction ==
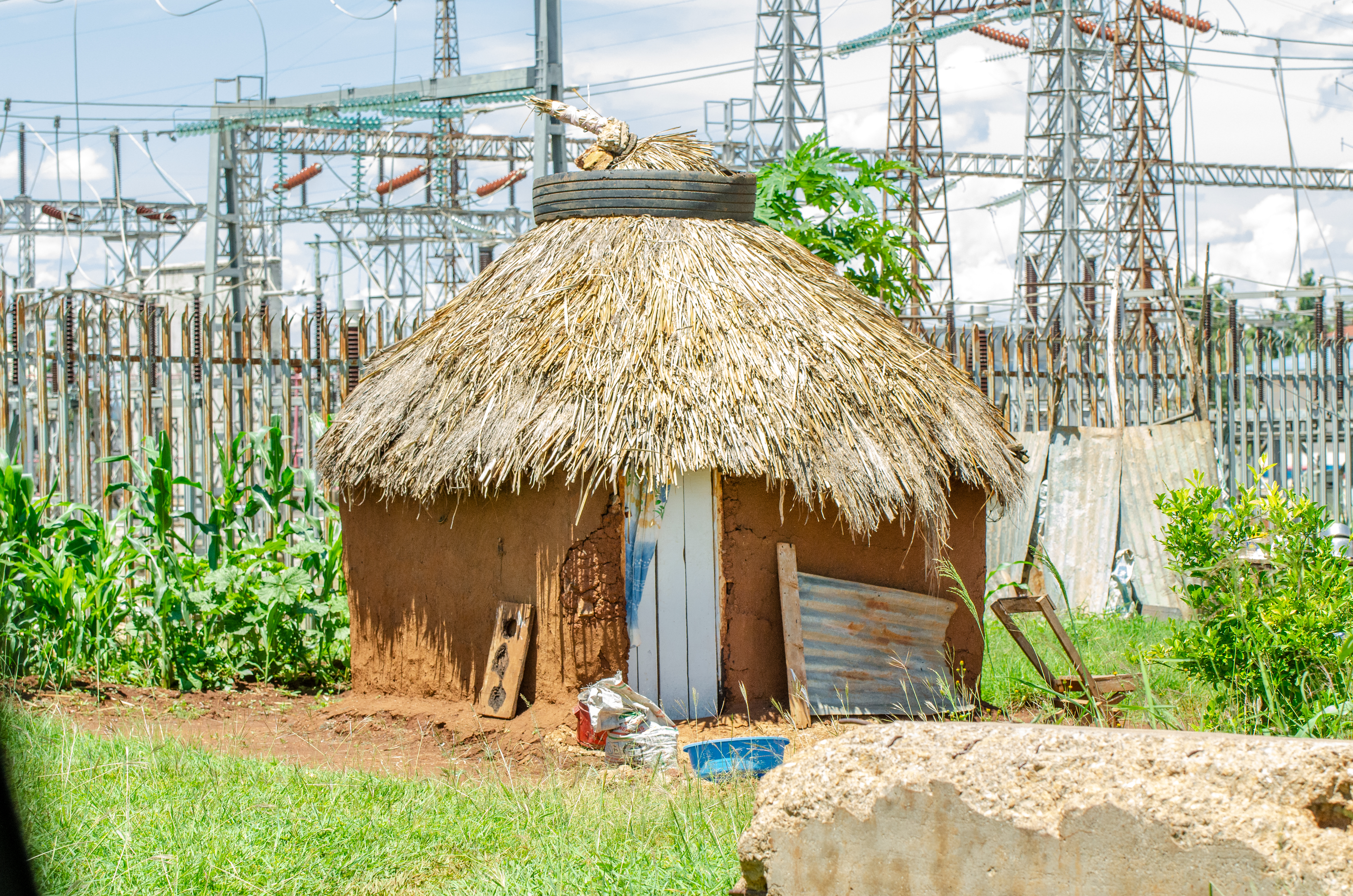
High voltage center near a hut

To reduce electricity transmission losses in the country, UETCL has borrowed US$100 million (UGX:337 billion) from Exim Bank of China to construct four mega substations. The installations will feed the industrial parks at Luzira, Namanve, Mukono, and Iganga. The work also involves construction of 38 kilometres (24 mi) of 132 kilovolt transmission lines. The work was expected to be complete in 2019.

== New board members ==
In June 2022, Ruth Nankabirwa, the incumbent Minister of Energy and Minerals, introduced and swore in a new board of directors for the company. The new board members are:

- Kwame Ejalu: chairman
- Sharon Achiro
- Sylvia Muheebwa Nabatanzi
- Cecilia Nakiranda
- Julius Mukooli
- Eng Innocent Oboko Yotkum

== See also ==
- Umeme
- Energy in Uganda
- Uganda Electricity Generation Company Limited
- Electricity Regulatory Authority
- List of power stations in Uganda
