= Suswa–Isinya–Rabai High Voltage Power Line =

Kenyan high voltage power line

Location
- Country: Kenya
- Coordinates: 3.930959°S 39.554875°E
- General direction: North to South
- From: Suswa, Kenya
- Passes through: Isinya, Bachuma, Voi
- To: Rabai, Kenya

Ownership information
- Owner: Government of Kenya
- Partners: African Development Bank
- Operator: Kenya Electricity Transmission Company

Construction information
- Expected: 2017

Technical information
- Current type: AC
- Total length: 300 mi (480 km)
- AC voltage: 400kV
- No. of circuits: 2

Suswa–Isinya–Rabai High Voltage Power Line is an operational high voltage (400 kilo Volts) electricity power line connecting the high voltage substation at Suswa, Kenya to another high voltage substation at Rabai, Kenya.

== Location ==
The power line starts at Suswa, in Narok County, about 80 kilometres (50 mi), by road, north-west of Nairobi, and runs in a south-easterly direction for approximately 90 kilometres (56 mi) to the Ketraco Power Substation at Isinya, in Kajiado County.

From Isinya, the power line follows a south-easterly course to end at Rabai, in Kilifi County, approximately 393 kilometres (244 mi), away, as the crow flies. The power line measures about 482 kilometres (300 mi).

== Overview ==
The original plan was to build a 220 kilo Volt transmission line. Plans were later revised and the voltage was increased to 400kV. The line serves three main purposes: (a) It transmits power generated from geothermal power stations in the Eastern Rift Valley, to Kenya's coastal region (b) It transmits power from thermal power stations near the coast to the industrial centers in and near Nairobi (c) Through Suswa, the power line connects to Lessos and Tororo, Uganda, allowing the export of electricity to Uganda and Rwanda.

== Construction ==
Construction started in August 2011, with the Rabai–Isinya section. Construction was budgeted at KSh14 billion (US$140 million), funded with loans from (i) the French Development Agency (ii) the European Investment Bank and (iii) the African Development Bank. The Government of Kenya, invested equity in the project. Kalpataru Power Transmission Limited (KPTL) from India, was the lead contractor on this project. Siemens was the substation contractor. After delays, the power line came on-line in the second half of 2017.

== See also ==
- Energy in Kenya
- Energy in Tanzania
- Isinya–Singida High Voltage Power Line
- Loiyangalani-Suswa High Voltage Power Line
- Bujagali–Tororo–Lessos High Voltage Power Line
