= Iringa–Sumbawanga High Voltage Power Line =

Tanzanian electricity power line

Location
- Country: Tanzania
- Coordinates: 08°46′14″S 33°45′46″E
- General direction: East to West
- From: Iringa, Tanzania
- Passes through: Mbeya, Tunduma
- To: Sumbawanga, Tanzania

Ownership information
- Owner: Government of Tanzania
- Partners: World Bank
- Operator: Tanzania Electric Supply Company

Construction information
- Expected: 2025; 1 year ago

Technical information
- Current type: AC
- Total length: 385 mi (620 km)
- AC voltage: 400kV
- No. of circuits: 2

The Iringa–Sumbawanga High Voltage Power Line, also Iringa–Mbeya–Tunduma–Sumbawanga High Voltage Power Line, is a high voltage electricity power line, under development in Tanzania. The 400 kiloVolts power line will connect the high voltage substation at Iringa, to another high voltage substation at Sumbawanga.

== Location ==
The power line starts in the city of Iringa, in Iringa Region, about 262 kilometres (163 mi) south of Dodoma, Tanzania's capital city. The power line runs in a southwesterly direction for approximately 334 kilometres (208 mi) to the city of Mbeya, in Mbeya Region.

At Mbeya, the power line continues southwestwards to the town of Tunduma, in Songwe Region, at the international border with Zambia, a distance of about 103 kilometres (64 mi). From Tunduma the line travels in a north-westerly direction for about 225 kilometres (140 mi) to end in the city of Sumbawanga in Rukwa Region. The power line, which does not follow the road all the time, is quoted to have a total length of approximately 620 kilometres (385 mi).

== Overview ==
The Iringa–Sumbawanga High Voltage Power Line serves two main purposes. The first is to create a high voltage backbone in the central and southern regions of Tanzania, stabilize the electricity grid and promote development in those communities. The second major purpose is to allow exchange of grid electricity between Tanzania and Zambia, and ultimately between the Eastern Africa Power Pool to which Tanzania belongs and the Southern African Power Pool to which Tanzania and Zambia belong.

== Construction ==
In June 2018, the World Bank Group committed to lend the Government of Tanzania, US$455 million, towards the execution of this infrastructure project. As part of this project, the electricity substation at Iringa will be updated from 220kV to 400kV, and new substations will be erected at Kisada, Mbeya, Tunduma and Sumbawanga. Work will also include a 4 kilometres (2.5 mi) double-circuit line from Tunduma to the Zambian border, which will be energized at 330kV. As of February 2020, the project was at tendering stage.

== See also ==
- Energy in Tanzania
- Isinya–Singida High Voltage Power Line
