= Isinya–Singida High Voltage Power Line =

High voltage power transmission line in Kenya and Tanzania

Location
- Country: Kenya and Tanzania
- Coordinates: 1.9950°S 36.8000°E
- General direction: North to south
- From: Isinya, Kenya
- To: Singida, Tanzania

Ownership information
- Owner: Government of Kenya & Government of Tanzania
- Partners: African Development Bank
- Operator: Kenya Electricity Transmission Company & Tanzania Electric Supply Company

Construction information
- Contractors: North China Power Engineering Company Limited
- Expected: 2024

Technical information
- Current type: AC
- Total length: 315.5 mi (507.7 km)
- AC voltage: 400kV
- No. of circuits: 2

The Isinya–Singida High Voltage Power Line is a high voltage electricity power line, under construction, connecting the high voltage substation at Isinya, Kenya to another high voltage substation at Singida, Tanzania.

== Location ==
The power line starts at Isinya, in Kajiado County, about 58 kilometres (36 mi) south of Nairobi, and runs in a southerly direction for approximately 109 kilometres (68 mi) to the border with Tanzania at Namanga.

At Namanga the power line crosses into Tanzania and follows a southerly direction to Arusha, a distance of about 110 kilometres (68 mi) from Namanga. From Arusha the line travels in a south-westerly direction for about 325 kilometres (202 mi) to end at Singida. According to the African Development Bank, 93.1 kilometres (58 mi) of the line are located in Kenya and 414.5 kilometres (258 mi) are located in Tanzania, for total length of 507.6 kilometres (315 mi).

== Overview ==
As far back as 2015, Kenya, Tanzania and Zambia began to explore the amount of electricity that can be moved along high voltage power lines linking the three countries. The objective was to exchange electricity between the Eastern Africa Power Pool to which both Kenya and Tanzania belong, and the Southern African Power Pool to which Tanzania ad Zambia belong. Each country would build and maintain the infrastructure within its borders. Kenya and Tanzania sought a joint consultant to advise on the project. A joint Environmental and Social Impact Assessment (ESIA) in both countries was carried out in 2014, funded by the African Development Bank (AfDB).

== Construction in Kenya ==
In October 2017, Ketraco, the Kenyan electricity transportation monopoly, awarded the construction contract for a 400kV substation at Isinya and the 96 kilometres (60 mi) 400kV high tension line from Isinya to Namanga, to North China Power Engineering Company Limited (NCPE). The work will be jointly financed by Kenyan government at US$4.25 million and the AfDB which will offer US$22.42 million in loans. Construction was expected to take 22 months.

In 2023, the development was met with construction delays related to compensation of landowners and lack of sufficient capital to do so. In January 2024, Business Daily Africa reported that completion of construction was expected in 2024. In March 2024, The EastAfrican reported that construction was completed but testing and calibration was ongoing with test completion planned for the end of April 2024.

== Construction in Tanzania ==
The work in Tanzania involves the construction of approximately 415 kilometres (258 mi) of double circuit high tension power lines, from Namanga, through Arusha to Singida, a 400kV substation in Arusha and another 400kV substation in Singida. The work is budgeted at US$258.82 million.

The section between Singida and Babati was contracted to Kalpataru Power Transmission Limited of India. The Babati to Arusha section was contracted to Bouygues Energies & Services of France. The Namanga to Arusha section was contracted to Energoinvest DD Sarajevo of Bosnia. Kenya is expected to establish a 400kV connection to Ethiopia, while Tanzania is expected to establish a similar 400kV connection to Zambia. This will enable seamless power sales between the four countries.

== Other considerations ==
In May 2024, as Kenya and Tanzania were hurrying to complete this power transmission line, the EastAfrican reported that the 400kV transmission line between Tanzania and Zambia is under construction and is scheduled for completion in November 2025. At that time Eastern Africa Power Pool countries will be able to trade power with the countries of the Southern Africa Power Pool.

== See also ==
- Energy in Kenya
- Energy in Tanzania
- Loiyangalani-Suswa High Voltage Power Line
- Suswa–Isinya–Rabai High Voltage Power Line
- Bujagali–Tororo–Lessos High Voltage Power Line
