= Olkaria–Lessos–Kisumu High Voltage Power Line =

Kenyan high voltage power transmission line

Location
- Country: Kenya
- Coordinates: 00°13′08″N 35°17′44″E
- General direction: East to West
- From: Olkaria, Kenya
- Passes through: Lessos, Eldoret
- To: Kisumu, Kenya

Ownership information
- Owner: Government of Kenya
- Partners: Japan International Corporation Agency
- Operator: Kenya Electricity Transmission Company

Construction information
- Expected: 2021

Technical information
- Current type: AC
- Total length: 180 mi (290 km)
- AC voltage: 400kV, 200kV
- No. of circuits: 2

The Olkaria–Lessos–Kisumu High Voltage Power Line is a high voltage electricity power line connecting the high voltage substation at Olkaria, Kenya to another high voltage substation at Kisumu, Kenya.

== Location ==
The power line starts at Olkaria, in Nakuru County, about 111 kilometres (69 mi), by road, north-west of Nairobi, and runs in a north-westerly direction to the Ketraco electricity substation in Lessos, in Nandi County.

From there, the power line travels further north-west to Eldoret, in Uasin Gishu County. There, the power line turns southwesterly in direction, to terminate in the city of Kisumu, on the eastern shores of Lake Victoria. The power line measures approximately 290 kilometres (180 mi), in length.

== Overview ==
This power line is intended to transmit power from the Olkaria geothermal electricity complex to the Western Kenya counties in the former Nyanza Province, bordering Lake Victoria. Prior to this line being constructed, the region depended on high cost thermal power derived from fossil fuels (at US$0.34 per kWh) or expensive energy imported from neighboring Uganda at US$0.22 per kWh. The transmission line is intended to supply energy to the region is sufficient quantities and at reasonable rates.

== Construction ==
This power line project is split into three lots. The first lot, consisting a 400kV line, measuring 213 kilometres (132 mi), stretches from Olkaria to Lessos with maximum carrying capacity of 1,200 megawatts. The second lot, from Lessos to Kisumu, measures 77 kilometres (48 mi) and is a 220kV line, capable of transmitting 400 megawatts of power. The third lot consists of three new substations at Olkaria, Lessos and Kisumu, with a new switch yard at Kibos.

The contractors on this project include (a) Kalpataru Power Transmission limited of India (b) NARI Group Corporation, of China and (c) Sieyuan Electric Company and China. The cost of this project is valued at US$94.7 million (KSh9.5 billion). Construction is funded with loans from the Japan International Corporation Agency (JICA).

Commissioning of the completed transmission line is expected during the second half of 2021.

== See also ==
- Energy in Kenya
- Loiyangalani-Suswa High Voltage Power Line
