= Karuma–Juba High Voltage Power Line =

Planned power line in Uganda and South Sudan

Karuma–Juba High Voltage Power Line Power Line

Location
- Country: Uganda & South Sudan
- Coordinates: 02°32′24″N 31°52′38″E
- General direction: South to North
- From: Karuma, Uganda
- Passes through: Olwiyo, Elegu, Nimule
- To: Juba, South Sudan

Ownership information
- Owner: Government of Uganda & Government of South Sudan
- Partners: East African Community & Japan International Cooperation Agency
- Operator: Uganda Electricity Transmission Company Limited & South Sudan Electricity Corporation

Construction information
- Construction started: TBD
- Expected: TBD

Technical information
- Current type: AC
- Total length: 380 km (240 mi)
- AC voltage: 400kV
- No. of circuits: 2

The Karuma–Juba High Voltage Power Line is a planned high voltage electricity power line, connecting the high voltage substation at Karuma, in Kiryandongo District, in the Western Region of Uganda, to another high voltage substation at Juba, in Jubek State, in South Sudan.

== Location ==
The 400kV power line, begins at the 400kV substation at Karuma Hydroelectric Power Station. The line travels in a north-westerly direction to Olwiyo, in Nwoya District, in the Northern Region of Uganda. This distance is approximately 56 kilometres (35 mi).

At Olwiyo, the line takes a general northerly direction to Elegu at the international border with South Sudan, a distance of about 140 kilometres (87 mi). The distance traveled by this power line in Uganda is therefore approximately 196 kilometres (122 mi).

After crossing the international border into South Sudan, the line travels through Nimule, in Imatong State to Juba, the capital city of South Sudan, a distance of approximately 195 kilometres (121 mi)

== Overview ==
This power line is planned to transmit electricity from the 600 megawatts Karuma Hydroelectric Power Station in Uganda, to Juba in South Sudan. It is part of the regional power-sharing protocols of the Nile Equatorial Lakes Subsidiary Action Program and of the East African Community. Uganda plans to sell electricity to neighboring countries, including South Sudan after Karuma Hydroelectric Power Station and Isimba Hydroelectric Power Station become operational. The government of South Sudan has plans to extend the high-voltage power line to Juba.

== Construction ==
The two governments are in discussions on how to fund the construction of the power line, using loans from the Japan International Cooperation Agency, with each country being responsible for the portion of the line in her territory. The feasibility and environmental impact studies for the 400kV power line were carried out between March 2023 and February 2024 by CESI S.p.A. and ELC Electroconsult S.p.A. both of Italy and Colenco Consulting Limited of Nigeria.

== Developments ==
In June 2023, South Sudan government officials signed a power purchase agreement (PPA) with officials from the Ugandan Ministry of Energy and Mineral Development. Under the agreement, Uganda will increase the voltage of the section of this transmission line that is in Uganda, from 132kV to 400kV. In addition, Uganda will supply power to several towns in South Sudan bordering Uganda, including Nimule, Elegu, Oraba, Kaya and others. South Sudan will be responsible for extending the transmission line to Juba.

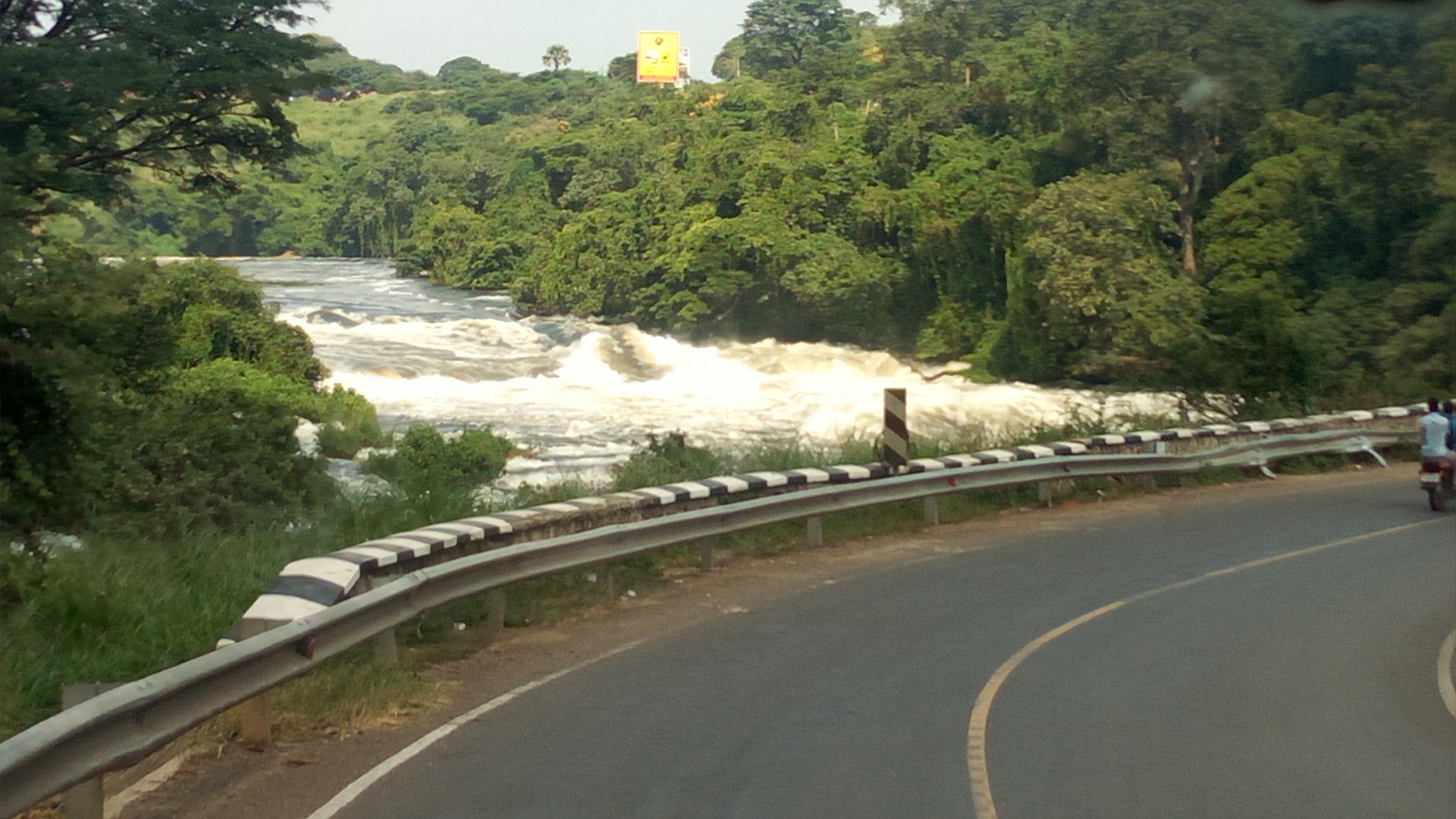
Karuma Bridge in 2024

In May 2024, high ranking executives from Sinohydro met with the president of Uganda and offered to construct the 140 kilometres (87 mi) Olwiyo-Nimule section of this power line for approximately US$180 million. Sinohydro also offered to finance the project if necessary.

The construction funding of this power line is summarized in the table below. The total cost is estimated at US$302 million (€277.6 million), sourced as outlined here.

Sources of Funding for Uganda-South Sudan High Voltage Power Line
Rank	Lender	Funding in US$ mln	Percentage	Beneficiary	Notes
1	European Union	100.0	33.1	South Sudan	Grant
2	AfDB	54.0	17.9	South Sudan	Grant
4	AfDB	148.0	49.0	Uganda	Loan
	Total	302.0	100.00		

- Note: Totals maybe off due to rounding.

== See also ==
- Bujagali–Tororo–Lessos High Voltage Power Line
- Nkenda–Mpondwe–Beni High Voltage Power Line
- Masaka–Mutukula–Mwanza High Voltage Power Line
