= Eastern Africa Power Pool =

International electricity grid collobration

Coordinates: 09°01′04″N 38°48′21″E

- EAPP

Electricity Grid Interconnection Organization overview
- Formed: February 24, 2005; 21 years ago
- Type: Electric Energy Grid Interconnection Agency
- Jurisdiction: Eleven Eastern African Countries
- Headquarters: Wereda 02, House 059, Bole Sub City, Addis Ababa, Ethiopia
- Electricity Grid Interconnection Organization executive: James Wahogo, Secretary General
- Website: eappool.org

The Eastern Africa Power Pool (EAPP), is a collaborative effort by eleven countries in Eastern Africa to interconnect their electricity grids and take advantage of excess capacity within the network and facilitate trade of electric power between the members.

== Location ==
The secretariat of the Eastern Africa Power Pool organisation is located at Wereda 02, House 059, Bole Sub City, in Addis Ababa, the capital and largest city of Ethiopia.

== History ==
In February 2005, seven countries in the Eastern African region came together because they saw mutual benefit in having one power pool. The original countries were, Burundi, Democratic Republic of the Congo, Egypt, Ethiopia, Kenya, Rwanda, and Sudan. Later, Tanzania (2010), Libya (2011), Djibouti and Uganda (2012) joined the pool.

The objectives of the Eastern Africa Power Pool include (a) the reduction of power costs within the region (b) facilitation of power trade between the members (c) increasing energy availability to citizens of member countries (d) increase the grid security of the member countries.

As a prerequisite to the success of these efforts, power grid interconnections between the member countries need to be established. Such interconnections include the interconnection between Ethiopia and Kenya via the Sodo–Moyale–Suswa High Voltage Power Line

Other such linkages are the Bujagali–Tororo–Lessos High Voltage Power Line, between Uganda and Kenya, the Isinya–Singida High Voltage Power Line, between Kenya and Tanzania, the Kawanda–Birembo High Voltage Power Line, between Uganda and Rwanda, the Nkenda–Mpondwe–Beni High Voltage Power Line, between Uganda and the Democratic Republic of the Congo. and the Karuma–Juba High Voltage Power Line between Uganda and South Sudan. In 2022, construction work began on the Kigoma–Butare–Ngozi–Gitega High Voltage Power Line to connect the electricity grid of Rwanda and Burundi.

== Pool capacity ==
The table below, outlines the installed capacity, peak demand and the excess capacity or deficit for each of the eleven countries in the Eastern Africa Power Pool, as of June 2019.

Members and capacities of countries in the Eastern Africa Power Pool
Country	Installed Capacity (MW)	Peak Demand (MW)	Surplus (MW)	Deficit (MW)
Burundi	50	100		50
Democratic Republic of the Congo	2,677	4,977		1,300
Djibouti	126	206		80
Egypt	45,192	30,400	14,792	
Ethiopia	4,206	3,700	506	
Kenya	2,711	1,640	1,071	
Libya	10,238			
Rwanda	218	231		13
Sudan	3,736	3,000	736	
South Sudan	131	300		169
Tanzania	1,513	1,998		485
Uganda	1,177	724	453	

== Member utility companies ==
The member countries of the Eastern Africa Power Pool and their respective electricity utility companies are listed in the table below.

Country	Electric utility
Burundi	Régie de Production et de Distribution de l'Eau et de l'Électricité (REGIDESO Burundi)
Democratic Republic of the Congo	Société Nationale d'Électricité (SNEL)
Djibouti	Electricité de Djibouti (EDD)
Egypt	Egyptian Electricity Holding Company (EEHC)
Ethiopia	Ethiopian Electric Power (EEP)
Kenya	Kenya Electricity Transmission Company (KETRACO)
Libya	General Electricity Company of Libya (GECOL)
Rwanda	Rwanda Energy Group Limited (REG)
Sudan	Sudanese Electricity Transmission Company (SETCO)
South Sudan	South Sudan Electricity Corporation (SSEC)
Tanzania	Tanzania Electric Supply Company Limited (TANESCO)
Uganda	Uganda Electricity Transmission Company Limited (UETCL)

== Transactions ==
Some of the transactions among EAPP member states include the following: In July 2022, Kenya signed a 25-year power purchase agreement with Ethiopia, where the latter will sell 200 MW of electric power to the former starting 1 November 2022 for the first three years. Thereafter the amount sold will increase to 400 MW for the remaining 22 year of the contract.

== Independent Regulatory Board ==
The Independent Regulatory Board (IRB) is an organ of EAPP. The IRB is mandated to establish, monitor and coordinate trade in electricity between the member countries of the EAPP.

Previously hosted at the EAPP in Addis Ababa, Ethiopia, the IRB was given more autonomy in 2012 and was allowed to exercise its independence. In May 2023, the Cabinet of Uganda approved hosting the headquarters of the IRB of the EAPP and granted it diplomatic status. The ERA of Uganda offered premises in Kampala for the IRB to rent.

In December 2023, the African Development Bank approved a loan of US$5.4 million to equip the new headquarters. The World Bank also named the consultant to design the trading platform.

== See also ==
- Southern African Power Pool
- Central African Power Pool
- West African Power Pool
- North African Power Pool
