= Turkwel–Ortum–Kitale High Voltage Power Line =

High voltage electricity transmission line in Kenya

Location
- Country: Kenya
- Coordinates: 01°40′23″N 35°29′15″E
- General direction: North to South
- From: Turkwel
- Passes through: Ortum
- To: Kitale

Ownership information
- Owner: Ketraco
- Partners: Exim Bank of India
- Operator: Kenya Electricity Transmission Company

Construction information
- Construction started: 2015
- Expected: 2024

Technical information
- Current type: AC
- Total length: 139 mi (224 km)
- AC voltage: 220kV
- No. of circuits: 1

Turkwel–Ortum–Kitale High Voltage Power Line is a high voltage electricity power line, under construction, connecting the high voltage substation at Turkwel, to another high voltage substation at Kitale, both in Kenya.

== Location ==
The power line starts at the 106 MW Turkwel Hydroelectric Power Station, in West Pokot County, as a 220kV single circuit high voltage power line. From there, the line travels in a general southerly direction through the town of Ortum also in West Pokot County, to end at Kitale in Trans-Nzoia County. The road distance between Turkwel and Kitale is approximately 139 miles (224 km).

== Overview ==
This power transmission line connects the Turkwel HPP directly to Ortum and Kitale. Before this line was established the electricity generated at Turkwel was evacuated through the Turkwell–Eldoret–Lessos High Voltage Transmission Line. However, the solar power stations (i) Alten, (ii) Eldsol and (iii) Radiant, owned by independent power producers are given priority, often crowding out Turkwel HPP. The new line will exclusively serve Turkwel HPP, which produces inexpensive hydropower.

== Construction and funding ==
The construction has been ongoing since the early 2010s. The engineering, procurement and construction (EPC) contract was awarded to KEC International Limited of India. The contract price was US$11,861,976 (KSh1,552,080,250 in May 2024 money). Funding was provided by the government of Kenya with loan support from the Exim Bank of India. Commercial commissioning is now expected in June 2024.

The project involves the building of two new substations, one at Kitale and another at Ortum and the expansion of the substation at Turkwel to allow an "alternative evacuation path for power generated at Turkwel HPP".

In August 2023, KETRACO acquired two transformers to facilitate the completion of this transmission line. The 220/132kV 90MVA transformer weighing 70 tonnes was utilized at the Kitale substation. The 220/33kV transformer weighing 40 tonnes was installed at the Ortum substation. The electrical equipment was installed by Shyama Power Limited of India and supervised by KETRACO.

== Other considerations ==
As of November 2020, Kenya had a national generation capacity of 2,766 MW, with maximum demand of 1,900 MW. So, on paper, the country had excess electricity, but in reality, due to insufficient transmission network, significant wattage was generated but not evacuated and therefore unused (not utilized). This transmission line is intended to evacuate 106 MW of clean, renewable and inexpensive electricity for domestic supply to spur economic development.

== See also ==
- Energy in Kenya
- Loiyangalani–Suswa High Voltage Power Line
