= Suswa Geothermal Power Station =

Geothermal power station in Kenya

- Location of Suswa Geothermal Power Station
- Country: Kenya
- Location: Suswa, Narok County, Kenya
- Coordinates: 01°09′38″S 36°14′17″E
- Status: Planned
- Commission date: 2024 Expected
- Owner: CYRQ Energy

Power generation
- Units operational: 2 (@ 37.5MW) + 6 (@ 42.5MW)
- Nameplate capacity: 330 megawatts (440,000 hp)

The Suswa Geothermal Power Station also known as Suswa Geothermal Power Plant is a planned geothermal power plant in Kenya, with installed electric generating capacity of 330 megawatts (440,000 hp)

== Location ==
The facility would be located in the Suswa Area, in Narok County, approximately 134 kilometres (83 mi), northwest of Nairobi, the country's capital and largest city. This is approximately 31 kilometres (19 mi), by road, southeast of Narok, where the county headquarters are located.

== Overview ==
CYRQ Energy, a United States-based energy and technology company, has carried out feasibility studies for a geothermal power station at the project site. The results of those studies support the development of an economically viable power station, with capacity of 330 megawatts.

The power station, to be developed in phases, will start with capacity of 75 megawatts. subsequent phases will raise output to 330 megawatts. The energy from this power station is expected to be sold to Kenya Power and Lighting Company, under a 25 year power purchase agreement.

== Timetable and funding ==
As of October 2018, the station owner/developers have submitted requests to install the power station at the development site. When those requests are approved, construction of the first phase is expected to follow and take an estimated three to four years. Later phases of the development would then follow. The entire development is estimated to cost KSh30 billion (US$300 million), financed through equity and debt.

== Ownership ==
The power station is owned by the company that is developing it; CYRQ Energy, headquartered in Salt Lake City, Utah.

== See also ==
- List of power stations in Kenya
- Geothermal power in Kenya
