= Nkenda =

- Location in Uganda; Placement on map is approximate
- Coordinates: 00°15′00″N 30°06′00″E
- Country: Uganda
- Region: Western Uganda
- District: Kasese District
- Constituency: Busongora North

Government
  - MP: William Nzoghu
- Elevation: 4,862 ft (1,482 m)

Nkenda is a hill in Kasese District in the Western Region of Uganda. The name is also applied to the settlement at the bottom of that hill.

== Location ==
Nkenda is located south of Bugoye and Mubuku, and approximately 13 kilometres (8 mi), by road, northeast of Kasese, the location of the district headquarters. The geographical coordinates of Nkenda are: 0°15'00.0"N, 30°06'00.0"E (Latitude:0.2500; Longitude:30.1000).

== Overview ==
Nkenda is in the foothills of the Rwenzori Mountains, at an average elevation of 1,482 metres (4,862 ft), above sea level. It lies along the Fort Portal-Kasese-Mpondwe Road.

== Points of interest ==
Nkenda is a power hub in Western Uganda. The Uganda Electricity Transmission Company Limited (UETCL), maintains a high-voltage substation at this location. The 226 kilometres (140 mi) 220kV Nkenda–Fort Portal–Hoima High Voltage Power Line originates here, and so does the proposed 153 kilometres (95 mi) 220kV Nkenda–Mpondwe–Beni High Voltage Power Line. This location is also the terminus of the 160 kilometres (99 mi) 132kV Mbarara–Nkenda High Voltage Power Line.

== See also ==
- Energy in Uganda
- List of power stations in Uganda
