= Nkenda–Mpondwe–Beni High Voltage Power Line =

Location
- Country: Uganda & Democratic Republic of the Congo
- Coordinates: 00°03′12″N 29°43′26″E
- General direction: East to West
- From: Nkenda, Uganda
- Passes through: Mpondwe, Kasindi
- To: Beni, DR Congo

Ownership information
- Owner: Government of Uganda & Government of the Democratic Republic of the Congo
- Partners: NELSAP & African Development Bank
- Operator: Uganda Electricity Transmission Company Limited & Congolese Electricity Utility Company

Construction information
- Construction started: TBD
- Expected: TBD

Technical information
- Current type: AC
- Total length: 153 km (95 mi)
- AC voltage: 220kV
- No. of circuits: 2

The Nkenda–Mpondwe–Beni High Voltage Power Line is a proposed high voltage electricity power line, connecting the high voltage substation at Nkenda, in Kasese District, in the Western Region of Uganda, to another high voltage substation at Beni, in North Kivu Province, in the Democratic Republic of the Congo.

== Location ==
The 220kV power line, begins at the substation at Nkenda, in Kasese District, Western Uganda. The line travels in a south-westerly direction through Mpondwe, to Kasindi, in the Democratic Republic of the Congo. There, it takes a general north-westerly course, to end at Beni, North Kivu Province, in the Democratic Republic of the Congo. The distance traveled by this power line in Uganda is approximately 73 kilometres (45 mi). The line travels approximately 80 kilometres (50 mi), in the Democratic Republic of the Congo.

== Overview ==
This power line is planned to transmit electricity to the eastern parts of the Democratic Republic of the Congo, as part the regional power-sharing protocols of the Nile Equatorial Lakes Subsidiary Action Program. Uganda plans to sell electricity to neighboring countries, including the Democratic Republic of the Congo, after Karuma Hydroelectric Power Station and Isimba Hydroelectric Power Station become operational in 2019. The government of the Democratic Republic of the Congo has plans to extend the high-voltage power line to Bunia and Butebo.

== Construction ==
The two governments are in discussions on how to fund the construction of the power line, using loans from the African Development Bank, with each country being responsible for the portion of the line in her territory.

== See also ==
- Bujagali–Tororo–Lessos High Voltage Power Line
- Nkenda–Fort Portal–Hoima High Voltage Power Line
- Masaka–Mutukula–Mwanza High Voltage Power Line
- Kawanda–Birembo High Voltage Power Line
