= Lessos =

Settlement in Kenya

Coordinates: 0°12′17″N 35°17′53″E

Lessos, also referred to as Ol'lessos, is an agricultural settlement located in Nandi county situated in the Rift Valley, Kenya. The settlements population was 2,438 as of 2019.

The settlement is located along the C36, a major road connecting the A104 (Eldoret-Nakuru highway) and the C39 (Eldoret-Kapsabet highway). The postal code for Lessos is 30314.

== Economy ==
The Ollessos Technical Training Institute is the primary employer in the center.

Other major employers in Lessos include the National Cereals Produce Board which has a warehouse of 4,500Mt capacity in the center, New KCC which has a cooling plant in Lessos and Ketraco which has a 400kv electricity substation located in the town as part of the Olkaria–Lessos–Kisumu High Voltage Power Line.

Other employers include an Access Bank branch, a post office, and small scale service providers such as shops, butcheries, furniture makers, cafes, restaurants and bars.
