= West African Power Pool =

Cooperation of national electricity companies in Western Africa

Coordinates: 06°21′43″N 02°29′25″E

- WAPP

Electricity Grid Interconnection Organization overview
- Formed: 5 December 1999; 26 years ago
- Type: Electric Energy Grid Interconnection Agency
- Jurisdiction: Fourteen West African Countries
- Headquarters: Zone des Ambassades; Cotonou, Republic of Benin
- Electricity Grid Interconnection Organization executive
- Website: Homepage

The West African Power Pool (WAPP) is a cooperation of the national electricity companies in Western Africa under the auspices of the Economic Community of West African States (ECOWAS). The members of WAPP are working to establish a reliable power grid for the region and a common market for electricity. It was founded in 2010.

== Location ==
Since 2006, the headquarters of WAPP are located at Zone des Ambassades, PK 606 BP 2907, in Cotonou, the capital city of the Republic of Benin. The geographical coordinates of the headquarters of WAPP are 6°21'43.0"N, 2°29'25.0"E (Latitude:6.361944; Longitude:2.490278).

== Overview ==
Member countries are Benin, Burkina Faso, Ghana, Guinea, Guinea Bissau, Ivory Coast, Liberia, Mali, Niger, Nigeria, The Gambia, Togo, Senegal, and Sierra Leone.

The WAPP integrates the national power systems into a unified regional electricity market and aims to promote trade of electricity among the ECOWAS member States – with the expectation that such mechanism would, over the medium to long-term, ensure the citizens of ECOWAS Member States with a stable and reliable electricity supply at affordable costs. A number of WAPP priority projects identified in the Master Plan are currently being implemented, including the Gouina Hydroelectric Power Station, the CLSG Interconnector and Riviera-Prestea Interconnector Project. Feasibility studies have been initiated for a number of other identified priority projects, namely the Fomi Hydroelectric Power Station, Kassa B Hydroelectric Power Station and Souapiti Hydroelectric Power Station. The current ongoing investment program of the WAPP is dictated by the 2019 – 2033 ECOWAS Master Plan for the development of Regional Power Generation and Transmission Infrastructure that was prepared with the support of the European Union and approved in December 2018 by the Authority of the ECOWAS Heads of State and Government through Supplementary Act A/SA.4/12/18. The Master Plan contains seventy-five (75#) priority projects of which twenty-eight (28#) are transmission line projects. Currently nine (9#) countries (Benin, Burkina Faso, Côte d’Ivoire, Ghana, Mali, Niger, Nigeria, Senegal and Togo) are interconnected and construction is ongoing to interconnect the remaining mainland countries namely Sierra Leone, Liberia, Guinea, Guinea Bissau and The Gambia by 2022.

== History ==
The West African Power Pool (WAPP) was created on 5 December 1999 at the 22nd summit of the ECOWAS Authority of Heads of State and Government. On 18 January 2006, the 29th summit of the ECOWAS Authority of Heads of State and Government held in Niamey, Niger, adopted the Articles of Agreement for WAPP organization and function. Since 2006, the headquarters of WAPP is based in Cotonou, Benin.

== Members ==
Country	Generation and transmission company and distribution	Electricity production (million kWh)
Benin	Société Béninoise d'Énergie Électrique and Communauté Électrique du Bénin	124
Burkina Faso	Société Nationale d'électricité du Burkina Faso	611.6
Côte d'Ivoire	Société de Gestion du Patrimoine du Secteur de l'Electricité (SOGEPE)	5,275
The Gambia	National Water and Electricity Company (NAWEC)	160
Ghana	Volta River Authority and Electricity Company of Ghana	6,746
Guinea	Electricité de Guinée	850
Guinea-Bissau	Electricidade e Aguas da Guine-Bissau	65
Liberia	Liberian Electricity Corporation	350
Mali	Energie du Mali	515
Niger		
Nigeria	Power Holding Company of Nigeria	3,900
Senegal	Société d'Électricité du Sénégal	1,880
Sierra Leone	National Power Authority (Sierra Leone)	80
Togo	Togo Electricité and Communauté Électrique du Bénin	

== See also ==
- Southern African Power Pool
- Eastern Africa Power Pool
- North African Power Pool
- Central African Power Pool
