= Comelec =

COMELEC or Comelec may refer to any of the following:

- Commission on Elections (Philippines) (Comelec)
- North African Power Pool: Comité Maghrébin de l'Electricité (COMELEC)
