= Kisumu Solar Power Station =

Solar farm in Kenya

- Country: Kenya
- Location: Kibos, Kisumu, Kisumu County
- Coordinates: 00°04′20″S 34°48′54″E
- Status: Proposed
- Construction began: August 2023
- Commission date: 2024 Expected
- Construction cost: US$52 million
- Owner: Kisumu One Solar Limited

Solar farm
- Type: Flat-panel PV
- Site area: 249 hectares (620 acres)

Power generation
- Nameplate capacity: 40 MW (54,000 hp)

The Kisumu Power Station, also Kisumu One Solar Power Station, is a 40 MW (54,000 hp) solar power plant under development in Kenya. It is owned by Ergon Solair Africa (ESA), based in Nairobi, Kenya. ESA is a subsidiary of Ergon Solair PBC, an American independent power producer, headquartered in Wilmington, Delaware, United States. The off-taker is the national electricity distribution company, Kenya Power and Lighting Company, under a long-term power purchase agreement.

== Location ==
The power station would sit on 249 hectares (620 acres) of roadside land, in Kibos, an industrial neighborhood in the city of Kisumu, on the shores of Lake Victoria in western Kenya. Kibos is located approximately 8 kilometres (5 mi) northeast of the central business district of Kisumu City.

== Overview ==
The design calls for a ground-mounted solar farm, sitting on 249 hectares (620 acres), with capacity generation of 40 megawatts. Its output is to be sold directly to Kenya Power Limited for integration into the national grid. The electricity will enter the national grid via a 220 kV substation near the solar farm. It is expected that this power station will add 105.3 MWh of electricity to the national grid annually.

== Developers ==
The table below illustrates the ownership of Kisumu One Solar Limited, the special purpose vehicle company that owns and is developing the solar farm.

Kisumu One Solar Limited Ownership
Rank	Shareholder	Domicile	Percentage	Notes
1	Ergon Solair Africa	Kenya		

- Note: On this project, Ergon Solair PBC is working through its wholly owned Kenyan subsidiary Ergon Solair Africa Limited.

== Construction costs and timeline ==
The construction costs have been reported as approximately US$64 million (about KSh. 7.6 billion in August 2022). Construction is expected to commence in the second half of 2022. Commercial commissioning is anticipated in December 2023. On 8 August 2022, Afrik21.africa, reported that construction of the power station had started.

== Other considerations ==
It has been reported that the PPA between Kenya Power and the owners of this power station will be at US$0.0575) for every 1kiloWatthour (1kWh)," basis.

== See also ==
- List of power stations in Kenya
