= Kigoma–Butare–Ngozi–Gitega High Voltage Power Line =

High voltage power transmission line in Rwanda and Burundi

Location
- Country: Rwanda and Burundi
- Coordinates: 02°50′53″S 29°48′29″E
- General direction: North to South
- From: Kigoma, Rwanda
- Passes through: Butare, Ngozi
- To: Gitega, Burundi

Ownership information
- Owner: Government of Burundi & Government of Rwanda
- Partners: European Union & African Development Bank
- Operator: REGIDESO Burundi & Rwanda Energy Group Limited

Construction information
- Contractors: Multiple
- Construction started: 2022
- Expected: 2024
- Construction cost: €24.4 million

Technical information
- Current type: AC
- Total length: 140.7 km (87.4 mi)
- AC voltage: 220kV
- No. of circuits: 1

The Kigoma–Butare–Ngozi–Gitega High Voltage Power Line, also Rwanda–Burundi High Voltage Power Line is a high voltage electricity power line, under construction, connecting the high voltage substation at Kigoma in Rwanda to another high voltage substation at Gitega in Burundi.

== Location ==
The 220 kilovolt power line starts at the Rwanda Energy Group (REG) 220kV substation in the town of Kigoma Rwanda, approximately 76.5 kilometres (48 mi), by road, southwest of Kigali, the capital and largest city of Rwanda. From here, the power line travels to the southern Rwandan town of Butare (Huye), a road distance of about 51 kilometres (32 mi). From Butare, the power line continues south to the international border with Burundi. It crosses the border and continues to the town of Ngozi, a road distance of approximately 75 kilometres (47 mi)

From Ngozi, power line travels in a general southerly direction to the city of Gitega, the capital of Burundi, a road distance of approximately 83 kilometres (52 mi), ending at another 220kV substation, this one owned by REGIDESO Burundi. The length of this power line is reported to be 140.7 kilometres (87 mi) from end to end, with 61.5 kilometres (38 mi) in Rwanda and 79.2 kilometres (49 mi) in Burundi.

== Overview ==
This power transmission line connects the electricity grid of Rwanda to that of neighboring Burundi. It is in line with the Nile Equatorial Lakes Subsidiary Action Program, Interconnection of Electric Grids Project, led by Regional Manager, Grania Rubomboras. The power line is being developed to facilitate exchange of electricity between the two neighboring countries and to be ready to buy electricity from other countries in the Eastern Africa Power Pool (EAPP), who have surplus power to sell. The countries with surplus power in the EAPP include Ethiopia, Kenya and Uganda.

== Construction in Burundi ==
Construction in Burundi was launched in August 2020. The engineering, procurement and construction (EPC) contract was awarded to a consortium comprising Transrail Lighting from India and Hanbaek from South Korea. The Burundi portion of this power transmission line is funded by loans to the government of Burundi, provided by the African Development Bank and the European Union.

== Construction in Rwanda ==
In 2018, it was reported that KfW was going to fund the Rwanda portion of this power line. In 2022, online media reported that the entire line in both countries would be funded by the African Development Bank and the European Union.

== Other consideration ==
The power line is designed in a fashion that allows it to operate at either 110kV or 220kV, if and when the need arises. Work involves the construction of new substations at Kigoma and Gitega, as well as connecting both ends of the transmission power line to control centers in Kigali, Rwanda for the northern end and Bujumbura, Burundi for the southern end.

== See also ==
- Energy in Burundi
- Energy in Rwanda
