= Masaka–Mutukula–Mwanza High Voltage Power Line =

Location
- Country: Uganda & Tanzania
- Coordinates: 00°59′51″S 31°24′52″E
- General direction: North to South
- From: Masaka, Uganda
- Passes through: Mutukula, Bukoba
- To: Mwanza, Tanzania

Ownership information
- Owner: Government of Uganda & Government of Tanzania
- Partners: East African Community
- Operator: Uganda Electricity Transmission Company Limited & Tanzania Electric Supply Company Limited

Construction information
- Construction started: TBD
- Expected: TBD

Technical information
- Current type: AC
- Total length: 582 km (362 mi)
- AC voltage: 400kV
- No. of circuits: 2

The Masaka–Mutukula–Mwanza High Voltage Power Line is a proposed high voltage electricity power line, connecting the high voltage substation at Masaka, in Masaka District, in the Central Region of Uganda, to another high voltage substation at Mwanza, in Mwanza Region, in the Republic of Tanzania.

== Location ==
The power line starts at the Uganda Electricity Transmission Company Limited (UETCL) 220kV substation in Masaka. The line travels in a general southwesterly direction to Mutukula, at the international border with Tanzania. From Mutukula, the power line continues in a general southeasterly direction to Bukoba, on the western shores of Lake Victoria. From Bukoba, the line loops around the lake, and continues eastwards to end at Mwanza. The Ugandan portion of the power line measures 82 kilometres (51 mi). The distance travelled by the power line in Tanzania is approximately 500 kilometres (311 mi).

== Overview ==
This power line is intended to enable Uganda and Tanzania to share electric energy. As part of the energy-sharing protocols of the East African Community, and Nile Basin Initiative, Uganda plans to increase energy sales to Tanzania, when Karuma Hydroelectric Power Station comes online. The construction of this high voltage power line has been planned as far back as 2011.

== Construction ==
As of January 2018, the feasibility study, environmental impact assessment and population resettlement plans were complete. Plans to construct the power line were underway, under the auspices of the East African Community. In February 2019, Uganda's junior energy minister, Simon D'Ujanga announced that funds had been secured to upgrade this power line to 400kV.

In May 2022 during meetings held in Entebbe, Uganda between Presidents Yoweri Museveni of Uganda and his guest, Samia Suluhu of Tanzania, an MOU was signed for the two countries to source funds and build this power line at 400kV. In the EastAfrican newspaper the power line is referred to as the Masaka–Mutukula–Kyaka–Nyakanazi–Mwanza High Voltage Power Line.

== See also ==
- Bujagali–Tororo–Lessos High Voltage Power Line
- Nkenda–Fort Portal–Hoima High Voltage Power Line
- Nkenda–Mpondwe–Beni High Voltage Power Line
