= Sodo–Moyale–Suswa High Voltage Power Line =

HVDC interconnection between Ethiopia and Kenya

- Map of Sodo–Moyale–Suswa High Voltage Power Line

Location
- Country: Ethiopia & Kenya
- General direction: North to South
- From: Sodo, Ethiopia
- To: Suswa, Kenya

Ownership information
- Owner: Government of Kenya & Government of Ethiopia
- Partners: African Development Bank
- Operator: Ethiopian Electric Power Corporation & Kenya Electricity Transmission Company

Construction information
- Commissioned: November 2022

Technical information
- Type: overhead transmission line
- Current type: HVDC
- Total length: 1,045 km (649 mi)
- Capacity: 2000 MW
- DC voltage: 500 kV

The Sodo–Moyale–Suswa High Voltage Power Line (or Ethiopia–Kenya HVDC Interconnector) is a 500 kV bipolar high-voltage direct current electricity power transmission line connecting Ethiopia with Kenya. It was completed in November 2022.

== Overview ==
The power line was constructed to enable Ethiopia to transfer surplus electricity to Kenya, for sale to the countries of the East African Community and the Great Lakes Region. The power generated in Ethiopia is less expensive than that generated in Kenya, and electricity imports over the interconnector were expected to lower power prices in Kenya and promote industrial growth in the country.

The project was budgeted at KSh 126 billion (approximately US$1.26 billion). Funding was sourced from the World Bank and the African Development Bank, the principal financier.

== Route ==
The power line starts at Sodo (Wolayta-Sodo), in Wolaita Zone, Southern Nations, Nationalities, and Peoples Region, about 313 kilometres (194 mi) by road south-west of Addis Ababa, the capital and largest city of Ethiopia. From Sodo, the power line runs in a south-easterly direction for approximately 400 km (249 mi), as the crow flies, to Moyale, at the international border with Kenya.

From Moyale, the power line follows a south-westerly course to end near Suswa, in Kajiado County, approximately 600 km (373 mi) away, as the crow flies. The power line measures about 1,045 km (649 mi), of which approximately 600 km (373 mi) is in Kenya.

== Construction ==
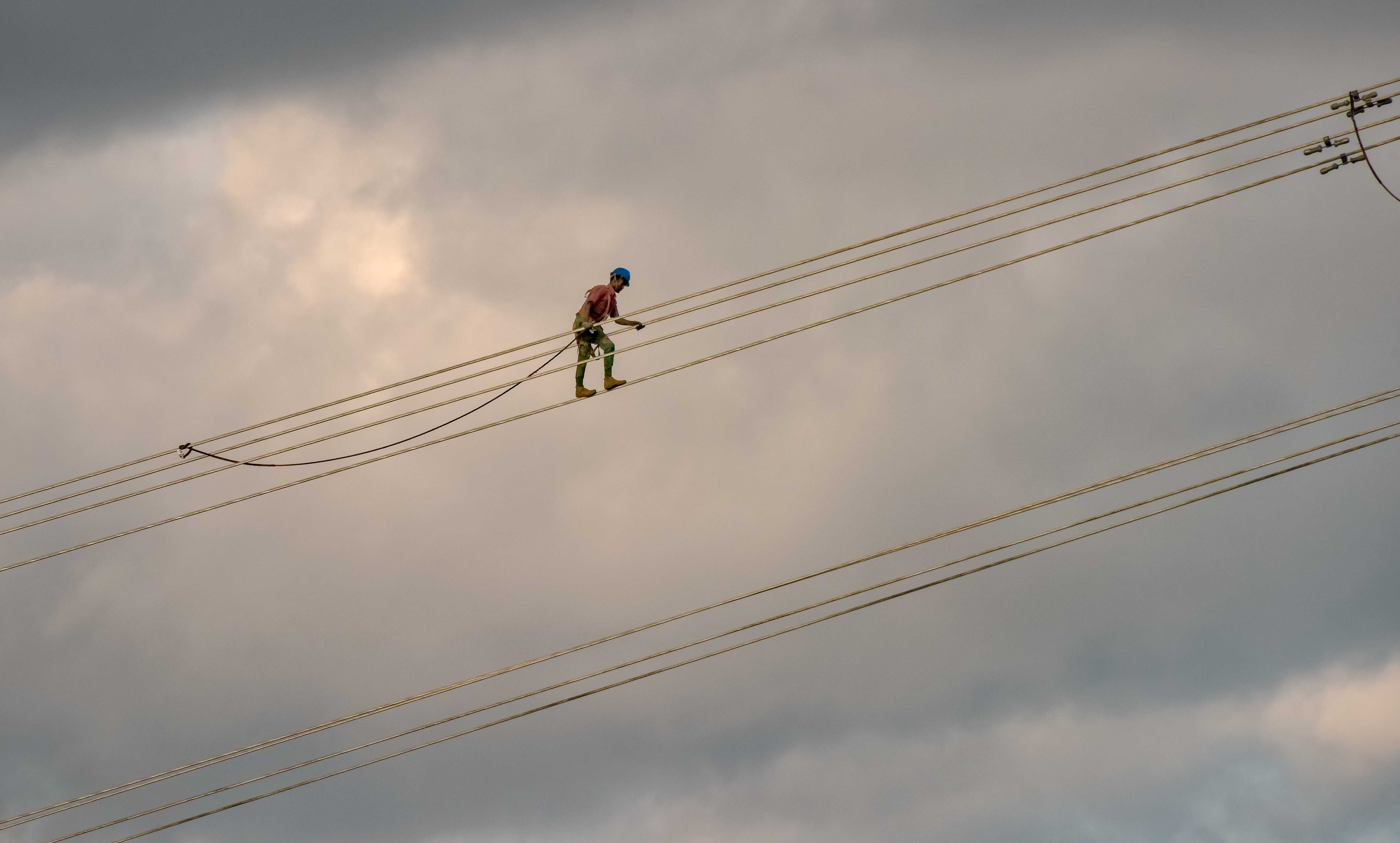
Lineman on a bundle conductor of the line during construction in Ethiopia

The contractor for the 457 km (284 mi) of power line inside Ethiopia was China Electric Power Equipment and Technology (CET). CET was also responsible for cross-border cabling and a 40 km (25 mi) section in Kenya, near a place called Logologo, and the converter station in Sodo. In September 2019, it was reported that CET had completed construction of the Ethiopian section of this power line.

KEC International Limited (KEC), an Indian company, was contracted to build the 195 km (121 mi) section from Elboro to Logologo, in Marsabit County.

Larsen and Toubro Limited was responsible for building the section from Logologo to Kinamba in Laikipia County, measuring 201 kilometres (125 mi). The Kinamba to Suswa section is contracted to Kalpataru Power Transmission Limited, and it measures about 237 kilometres (147 mi). A new 500 kV substation was included in the scope of work.

The interconnector was put into service in November 2022.

== See also ==
- Energy in Ethiopia
- Energy in Kenya
- Loiyangalani-Suswa High Voltage Power Line
