= Kibos =

Neighborhood in Kisumu City, Kenya

- Location within Kenya
- Coordinates: 00°04′08″S 34°48′55″E
- Country: Kenya
- County: Kisumu County
- Elevation: 1,143 m (3,750 ft)
- Time zone: UTC+3 (EAT)

Kibos is a neighborhood in the city of Kisumu, the third largest city in Kenya, and the second largest city, after Kampala, Uganda, in the Lake Victoria basin.

== Location ==
Kibos is located northeast of the city center, approximately 8 kilometres (5 mi), by road, from the central business district of Kisumu. This is approximately 340 kilometres (211 mi), by road, northwest of Nairobi, the capital and largest city of Kenya.

The geographical coordinates of Kibos, Kenya are 0°04'08.0"S, 34°48'55.0"E (Latitude:-0.068889; Longitude:34.815278). Kibos is located at an average elevation of 1,143 metres (3,750 ft) above mean sea level.

== Geography ==
The neighborhood is traversed by the Kibos River, which passes through the settlement in a general north-to-south direction.

== Transport ==
It is served by a railway station along the Kisumu branchline of the national railway system.

== The economy ==
The neighborhood is zoned as an industrial distinct. It hosts the offices and factories of Kibos Sugar and Allied Industries Limited, a privately owned sugar manufacturer. The factory manufactures both white and brown sugar, molasses, ethanol and paper. An attached 18 MW co-generation power station uses bagasse as raw material. The industrial complex employs in excess of 1,000 direct employees.

Th neighborhood is also the location of Kisumu Solar Power Station. The 40 MW, ground-mounted solar farm is under development by American and Canadian investors. When commercially commissioned as expected in 2023, the power generated will be sold to Kenya Power and Lighting Company, for integration into the national electricity grid.

== See also ==
- Railway stations in Kenya
- List of sugar manufacturers in Kenya
