= Central African Power Pool =

- CAPP

Electricity Grid Interconnection Organization overview
- Formed: 2003; 23 years ago
- Type: Electric Energy Grid Interconnection Agency
- Jurisdiction: Ten Central African Countries
- Headquarters: 14th Floor, Namemba Tower, Brazzaville, Republic of Congo
- Website: www.peac-sig.org

The Pool Energetique De L'Afrique Centrale (PEAC), also Central African Power Pool, is an association of ten Central African countries. The major aim of the association is to interconnect the electricity grids of the member countries in order to facilitate the trading of electric power between the members. PEAC is one of the five regional power pools in Africa.

== Location ==
The headquarters of CAPP are located on the 14th Floor of Nabemba Tower, in the city of Brazzaville, the capital and largest city in the Republic of the Congo. The geographical coordinates of CAPP's headquarters are 4°16'19.0"S, 15°17'22.0"E (Latitude:-4.271944; Longitude:15.289444).

== Overview ==
Member countries are Angola, Burundi, Cameroon, Republic of the Congo, Central African Republic, Chad, Democratic Republic of the Congo, Gabon, Equatorial Guinea, and São Tomé and Príncipe. The energy compact was established in 2003 and focuses on developing electricity interconnections between member states.

== Members ==
The member countries and their respective electricity utility companies are listed in the table below.

Country	Electric utility
Angola	Empresa Rede Nacional de Transporte de Electricidade (RNT-EP)
Burundi	Régie de Production et de Distribution de l'Eau et de l'Électricité (REGIDESO Burundi)
Cameroon	Eneo Cameroon S.A. (ENEO)
Republic of the Congo	Société Nationale d’ Electricité (SNE)
Central African Republic	Energie Centrafricaine (Enerca)
Chad	Societe Nationale d'Electricite
Democratic Republic of the Congo	Société Nationale d'Électricité (SNEL)
Gabon	Société d’Energie et d’Eau (SEEG)
Equatorial Guinea	Sociedad de Electricidad de Guinea Ecuatorial (SEGESA)
São Tomé and Príncipe	Empresa de Água e Electricidade (EMAE)

== See also ==
- Southern African Power Pool
- Eastern Africa Power Pool
- West African Power Pool
- North African Power Pool
