= Mbarara–Nkenda High Voltage Power Line =

Ugandan high voltage electricity transmission line

Location
- Country: Uganda
- Coordinates: 00°15′26″N 30°06′58″E
- General direction: East to West
- From: Mbarara, Uganda
- Passes through: Ishaka, Kasese
- To: Nkenda, Uganda

Ownership information
- Owner: Government of Uganda
- Partners: African Development Bank, French Development Agency
- Operator: Uganda Electricity Transmission Company Limited

Construction information
- Construction started: 2014
- Expected: Commissioning 2019

Technical information
- Current type: AC
- Total length: 160 km (99 mi)
- AC voltage: 132kV
- No. of circuits: 2

The Mbarara–Nkenda High Voltage Power Line is a high voltage electricity power line, connecting the high voltage substation in the city of Mbarara, in the Western Region to another high voltage substation at Nkenda, also in the Western Region of Uganda.

== Location ==
The 132 kilo Volt power line starts at the Uganda Electricity Transmission Company Limited (UETCL) 132kV substation at Mbarara, Mbarara District, the largest city in Uganda's Western Region. From there it travels westwards to the town of Ishaka, Bushenyi District, a distance of approximately 61 kilometres (38 mi). From Ishaka, the power line takes a general northerly direction and travels through Rubirizi, Kikorongo and Kasese, to end at Nkenda, a distance of approximately 108 kilometres (67 mi), from Ishaka. The power line does not follow the road all the time as is slightly shorter, measuring a total of 160 kilometres (99 mi).

== Overview ==
The power line was developed as part of plans to improve grid power delivery and reliability to the districts in the Western Region of Uganda. The power line also picks up the power generated by about 5 to 6 small hydro projects in the Rwenzori Region for integration into the national grid. A loan obtained from the French Development Agency (AFD), was used in funding the construction of this power line, including a 132/33kV substation at Mbarara.

== Construction ==
Work on this power transmission line began in 2014. Completion was initially planned for 2015. However due to delays with land acquisition, completion was not achieved until February 2019. In addition to funding from the French Development Agency, the African Development Bank lent US$34 million (UShs122.4 billion), towards the construction of this power transmission project.

== See also ==
- Energy in Uganda
- List of power stations in Uganda
