= North African Power Pool =

- Comité Maghrébin de l'Electricité (COMELEC); Maghreb Electricity Committee

Electricity Grid Interconnection Organization overview
- Type: Electric Energy Grid Interconnection Agency
- Jurisdiction: Five North African Countries

The Comité Maghrébin de l'Electricité (COMELEC), also Maghreb Electricity Committee and North African Power Pool, is an association of five North African countries belonging to the Arab Maghreb Union (Union du Maghreb Arabe). The major aim of the association is to interconnect the electricity grids of the member countries in order to facilitate the trading of electric power between the members. North African Power Pool is one of the five regional power pools in Africa.

== Overview ==
Member countries are Algeria, Libya, Mauritania, Morocco, and Tunisia. One of the projects in the 2,700-kilometre (1,678 mi) high voltage power line from Morocco to Egypt through Algeria, Tunisia and Libya. There are several other ongoing programs.

== Members ==
The member countries and their respective electricity utility companies are listed in the table below.

Country	Electric utility
Algeria	Société nationale de l'électricité et du gaz (Sonelgaz)
Libya	General Electric Company of Libya (GECOL)
Morocco	Office national d'électricité (ONE)
Mauritania	Société Mauritanienne d'Electricité (SOMELEC)
Tunisia	Société tunisienne de l'électricité et du gaz (STEG)

== See also ==
- Southern African Power Pool
- Eastern Africa Power Pool
- West African Power Pool
- Central African Power Pool
