= Communauté Électrique du Bénin =

The Communauté Electrique du Bénin - CEB (Electricity Community of Benin) is an international organisation co-owned by the governments of Bénin and Togo. It is in charge of developing electricity infrastructure in both countries, which strongly depend on energy imports from Ghana. Most of the energy consumed by Benin and Togo is generated in Ghana.

CEB owns the Nangbeto dam in Togo with an installed capacity of 64 MW. It has three customers: the Société Béninoise d'Énergie Électrique, Togo Electricité and the Togo Phosphates Agency (Office togolais des phosphates).

== See also ==
- Energy in Benin
- Energy law
