= Bujagali–Tororo–Lessos High Voltage Power Line =

High voltage electricity power line in Uganda and Kenya

Location
- Country: Uganda and Kenya
- Coordinates: 0.694444°N 34.207778°E
- General direction: West to East
- From: Bujagali, Uganda
- Passes through: Tororo, Malaba, Eldoret
- To: Lessos, Kenya

Ownership information
- Owner: Government of Uganda & Government of Kenya
- Partners: Japan International Cooperation Agency and African Development Bank
- Operator: Uganda Electricity Transmission Company Limited & Kenya Electricity Transmission Company

Construction information
- Contractors: Multiple
- Construction started: 2015
- Expected: TBA

Technical information
- Current type: AC
- Total length: 162 mi (261 km)
- AC voltage: 220kV and 400kV
- No. of circuits: 2

Bujagali–Tororo–Lessos High Voltage Power Line is a high voltage electricity power line, under construction, connecting the high voltage substation at Bujagali, in Uganda to another high voltage substation at Lessos, in Kenya.

== Location ==
The power line starts at Bujagali Hydroelectric Power Station, in Jinja District, as a 220kV high voltage power line. From here, the line travels to the eastern Ugandan town of Tororo, a distance of about 127 kilometres (79 mi). At Tororo, the voltage is stepped up to 400kV, and the line travels in that state, through the town of Eldoret, to Lessos, in Nandi County, a total distance of approximately 133 kilometres (83 mi).

== Overview ==
This power transmission line connects the electricity grid of Uganda to that of neighboring Kenya. It is in line with The Nile Equatorial Lakes Subsidiary Action Program (NELSAP), Interconnection of Electric Grids Project, led by Regional Manager, Grania Rubomboras.

The power line satisfies Uganda's need to export electricity to Kenya. It also satisfies Kenya's need to sell electricity to Uganda and the countries to the west of Kenya, including Rwanda, Burundi and the Democratic Republic of the Congo.

== Construction in Uganda ==
The Bujagali–Kenya border section is jointly funded by (a) the government of Uganda (GoU), (b) the African Development Bank (AfDB), and (c) the Japan International Cooperation Agency (JICA). As of May 2019, the construction was on hold, as a new EPC contractor was being sought. Plans are underway to energize the Bujagali to Tororo section in Uganda to 400kV. As of August 2024, construction was at 70 percent complete at the 220kV level.

== Construction in Kenya ==
The Lessos–Uganda border section is jointly funded by the government of Kenya and the African Development Bank, at an initial cost of KSh2.3 billion. Construction is ongoing, with commercial commissioning, expected in December 2019. As of August 2024, the work on the Kenyan section of this line was stalled at about 50 percent at the 400kV level due to contractor issues.

== See also ==
- Energy in Uganda
- Energy in Kenya
- Masaka–Mutukula–Mwanza High Voltage Power Line
