= Kenya Power and Lighting Company =

Kenyan public utility company

Coordinates: 01°16′18″S 36°49′14″E

- Company type: Public
- Traded as: NSE: KPLC
- Industry: Electric utility
- Predecessor: Mombasa Electric Power & Lighting Company; Nairobi Power & Lighting Syndicate
- Founded: 6 January 1922; 104 years ago by merger
- Founder: Harrali Esmailjee Jeevanjee & Clement Hertzel
- Headquarters: Nairobi, Kenya
- Key people: Joy Brenda Masinde, Chairperson of the Board of Directors; Dr. Eng. Joseph Siror, Managing Director & Chief Executive Officer
- Products: Electrical power
- Services: Electricity distribution
- Website: www.kplc.co.ke

Kenya Power and Lighting Company, commonly referred to as Kenya Power or shortened KPLC, is a public liability company which transmits, distributes and retails electricity to customers throughout Kenya.

== Location ==
KPLC headquarters are at Stima Plaza, Kolobot Road in Parklands, Nairobi. The coordinates of the company headquarters are: 01°16'18.0"S, 36°49'14.0"E (Latitude:-1.271668; Longitude:36.820552).

== Overview ==
Kenya Power is a public company listed in the Nairobi Securities Exchange (NSE). The company is a national electric utility company, managing electric metering, licensing, billing, emergency electricity service and customer relations.

In addition to electricity distribution to industry, offices, schools, hospitals, and domestic users, KPLC also offers optic fiber connectivity to telecommunication companies through its optical fiber cable network that runs along its high voltage power lines across the country mainly to manage the national power grid.

== History ==
Kenya Power traces its origins to 1875 when Seyyied Barghash, the Sultan of Zanzibar, acquired a generator to light his palace and nearby streets. This generator was acquired in 1908 by Harrali Esmailjee Jeevanjee, a Mombasa-based merchant, leading to the formation of the Mombasa Electric Power and Lighting Company whose mandate was to provide electricity to the island. In the same year, Engineer Clement Hirtzel was granted the exclusive right to supply Nairobi city with electricity. This led to the formation of the Nairobi Power and Lighting Syndicate.

In 1922, the Mombasa Electric Power and Lighting Company and Nairobi Power and Lighting Syndicate merged under a new company known as East African Power and Lighting Company (EAP&L). The EAP&L expanded outside Kenya in 1932 when it acquired a controlling interest in the Tanganyika Electricity Supply Company Limited (now TANESCO) and later obtaining a generating and distribution licenses for Uganda in 1936, thereby entrenching its presence in the East African region. EAP&L exited Uganda in 1948 when the Uganda Electricity Board (UEB) was established to take over distribution of electricity in the country.

On 1 February 1954, Kenya Power Company (KPC) was formed and commissioned to construct the transmission line between Nairobi and Tororo in Uganda This was to transmit power generated at the Owen Falls Dam to Kenya. KPC was managed by EAP&L under a management contract. In the same year, EAP&L listed its shares on the Nairobi Securities Exchange. Making it one of the first companies to list on the bourse.

EAP&L exited Tanzania in 1964 by selling its stake in TANESCO to the Government of Tanzania. Due to its presence in only Kenya, EAP&L was renamed the Kenya Power and Lighting Company Limited (KPLC) in 1983.

Kenya Power Company de-merged from KPLC in 1997 and rebranded to Kenya Electricity Generating Company (KenGen) and in 2008, the electricity transmission infrastructure function was carved out of KPLC and transferred to the newly formed Kenya Electricity Transmission Company (KETRACO). Kenya Power and Lighting Company (KPLC) was re-branded Kenya Power in June 2011.

== Shareholding ==
The 20 largest shareholders in the stock of KPLC, as of 31 August 2015, are illustrated in the table below:

Kenya Power and Lighting Company Stock Ownership
Rank	Name of Owner	Percentage Ownership
1	Ministry of Finance	50.09
2	Standard Chartered Nominees Limited	20.61
3	KCB Nominees Limited	5.72
4	CFC Stanbic Nominees Limited	2.97
5	NIC Custodial Services Limited	2.35
6	Equity Nominees Limited	1.32
8	Jubilee Insurance Company Limited	1.04
9	UAP Life Association Unitlink Fund	0.53
10	Old Mutual Life Assurance Company Limited	0.53
11	ICEA Lion Life Assurance Limited	0.49
12	Kenindia Assurance Company Limited	5.72
13	Alimohamed Adam	0.26
14	Kenya Reinsurance Corporation Limited	0.26
15	Phoenix of East Africa Assurance Company Limited	0.17
16	Natbank Trustee & Investment Services Limited	0.13
17	Savitaben Velji Raichand Shah	0.12
18	Dhimantlal Samji Shah	0.12
19	Kyalo Mwangulu Kilele	0.12
20	APA Insurance Limited	0.12
21	Other Shareholders	11.57
	Total	100.00

Note:Totals are slightly off due to rounding.

== Subsidiary ==
In 2015, KPLC elevated its wholly owned school, Kenya Power Training School to the Institute of Energy Studies and Research (IESR), to "provide training solutions for the power sector in the areas of generation, transmission, distribution and inter-connectivity". The primary target population are the countries of the Northern Corridor.

== Controversy ==
The company has been faced with a lot of controversy regarding making of losses, despite having a major source of profit through sale of electricity to the public, as well as charging exceptionally high electricity bills that caused public uproar. As of April 2021, the company had a commercial debt of KSh. 65.5 billion (approx. US$555 million).

== Power purchase from Ethiopia and Uganda ==
In 2022, Kenya Power Limited signed a 25-year power purchase agreement, whereby Ethiopian Electric Power will sell and Kenya Power will buy electricity at specified agreed rates. For the first three years, 200 MW will be exchanged, with the quantity increasing to 400 MW in the remaining 22 years of the contract. The power will be transmitted along the Sodo–Moyale–Suswa High Voltage Power Line. In 2022, Kenya Power began importing 200 MW of electricity from Ethiopia under a long-term power purchase agreement, with the quantity of power imported expected to rise to 400 MW in the future.

In 2024, Kenya began negotiating with Uganda to establish a formal power purchase agreement for 100 MW, between the two countries. This would replace the energy exchange arrangement between the two countries' power distribution companies: namely Kenya Power and UEDCL. Those discussions were still ongoing in February 2026.

== See also ==
- Energy in Kenya
- Kenya Electricity Generating Company
- Nairobi Securities Exchange
