= Isinya =

Town in Kajiado County, Kenya

Coordinates: 1°40′S 36°51′E

Isinya is a town in Kajiado County, Kenya. Isinya, located at -1.67 latitude, 36.85 longitude, is 58 km south of Nairobi and 19 km north of Kajiado, the capital of the district.

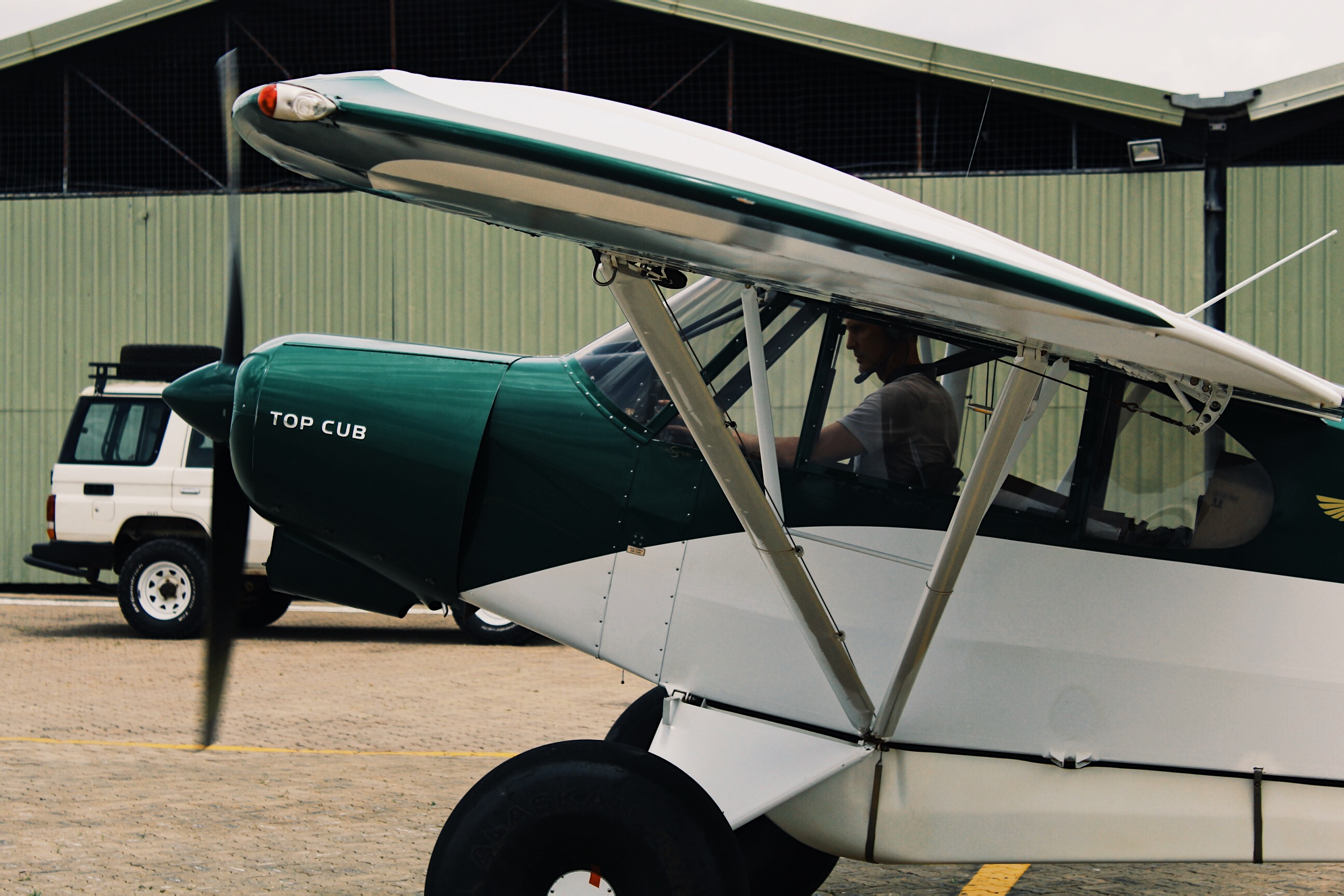
Aircraft at Orly Air Park.

The town of Isinya is situated along the Nairobi-Arusha highway. It has a population of 8,670.

Isinya has a private airfield called Orly Air Park, often mistakenly thought to be named after Orly Airport in Paris. The name Orly is actually short for the name of area where the airfield is based, Olooloitikosh. It also serves as recreational air park that prides itself as THE HOME OF SPORT AVIATION IN KENYA. . Some pilots and aviation schools prefer the airfield over Wilson Airport in Nairobi, due to lower costs.

The mineral gypsum is mined in this area.

== Resorts, Hotels and Lodges ==
Several facilities exist in the area including:

San Toki Country Resorts is located in Isinya along the pipeline road 5 Kilometers from Isinya Town and 32 Kilometers from Kiserian.

In Birika area there is also Olooloitikoshi Delights Kiserian a country lodge that offers accommodation and conference facilities in the area in close proximity to Orly Airpark.

== See also ==
- Kitengela, a town located north of Isinya

A nearby town Kiserian
