= Southern African Power Pool =

Cooperative of the national electricity companies in Southern Africa

- SAPP

Electricity Grid Interconnection Organisation overview
- Formed: August 1, 1995; 31 years ago
- Type: Electric Energy Grid Interconnection Agency
- Jurisdiction: Twelve Southern African Countries
- Headquarters: 24 Golden Stairs, Emerald Hill, Harare, Zimbabwe
- Website: www.sapp.co.zw

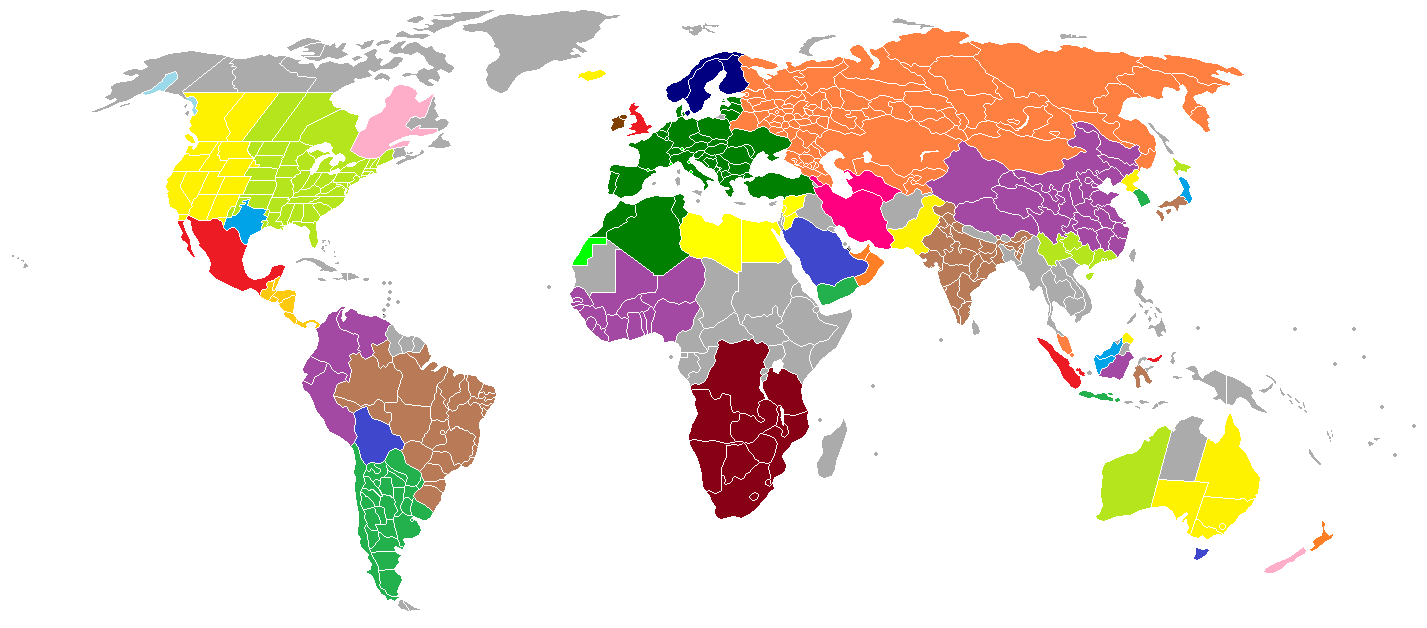
Several countries in southern Africa are part of SAPP

The Southern African Power Pool (SAPP) is a cooperation of the national electricity companies in Southern Africa under the auspices of the Southern African Development Community (SADC). The members of SAPP have created a common power grid between their countries and a common market for electricity in the SADC region.

== Location ==
The secretariat of the 17-member country organization is located at 24 Golden Stairs, Emerald Hill, in Harare, the capital and largest city in Zimbabwe.

== Overview ==
The Southern African Power Pool has many long-term goals it wishes to achieve. One of the main goals is to increase the accessibility of electricity to rural communities. Another goal is to improve the relationships between the member countries. There is need to develop sustainable development priorities, and to co-ordinate the planning of electric power.

Along with industrial productivity, electricity generation can assist in the Southern African Development Community (SADC)’s mandate of poverty elimination across Southern Africa. Only 5 percent of rural areas in Southern Africa have access to electricity. Lack of electric power impedes their access to clean water, limits the availability of food, and constrains access to clean, sustainable sanitation. In 2010, SADC passed the Regional Energy Access Strategy and Action Plan, which aims to combine regional energy resources as a means of ensuring the entire SADC region has access to affordable, sustainable electricity. The plan's goal is to reduce the number of people in the region without access to energy by 50 percent in the next ten years. Then reduce the remaining population by 50 percent in the next five years, and continue cutting it in half every five years until the region has universal access.

The most recent developments to the Southern African Power Pool came between the years of 1995 and 2005, where multiple interconnections were added. In 1995, an interconnector that ran from South Africa to Zimbabwe was completed, a Mozambique-South Africa interconnector was fixed in 1997, a Mozambique-Zimbabwe interconnector was finished, and most recently two power lines connecting South Africa to Maputo were finished.

== History ==
SAPP was founded in August 1995 at the SADC summit held in Kempton Park, South Africa. At that summit, member governments of SADC (excluding Mauritius) signed an Inter-Governmental Memorandum of Understanding for the formation of an electricity power pool in the region under the name of the Southern African Power Pool. Later, three other agreements were signed, including one between the respective electricity utilities in the member countries, another that lays down specific rules of operation and prices and the fourth agreement that spells out the operating procedures and guidelines.

Power trading between regions started in 1950 after the signed agreement between the Democratic Republic of Congo and Zambia. Other parts of the continent also started a power trading business until 1995. In 1995 SAPP was founded and it was the first power pool in Africa. Since then the SAPP influenced the energy market and started competitive energy markets such as a day-ahead market (DAM).

Every year, each member contributes a certain amount of money to the group as pre-determined in the document that set up the Power Pool. Today, most of the money that funds the Pool comes from donors, such as The World Bank and the Development Bank of Southern Africa.

== Plans ==
Currently being planned for development is a Zambia-Tanzania power line, a Mozambique-Malawi power line, the fixing of the old Zambia power line, and the construction of a third Inga hydropower station by means of the Western Power Corridor Project.

== Members ==
Country	Generation, transmission and distribution company	Electricity Production Capacity (million kWh)
Angola	Empresa Nacional de Electricidade de Angola	7.588
Botswana	Botswana Power Corporation	0.738
Democratic Republic of the Congo	Société nationale d'électricité (SNEL)	2.904
Eswatini	Eswatini Electricity Company	0.287
Lesotho (Note: supplied by South Africa)	Lesotho Electricity Company	0.075
Mozambique	Electricidade de Moçambique	2.770
Malawi	Electricity Supply Commission of Malawi	0.758
Namibia	NamPower	0.646
South Africa	Eskom	63.411
Tanzania	Tanzania Electric Supply Company	1.677
Zambia	Zambia Electricity Supply Corporation	2.900
Zambia	Copperbelt Energy Corporation	0.080
Zimbabwe	Zimbabwe Electricity Supply Authority	2.487

Member Status

The Botswansa Power Corporation, Electricidade de Mocambique, ESKOM, Eswatini Electricity Company, Lesotho Electricity Corporation, NAMPOWER, Societe Nationale d'Electricitite, Zesco Limited, and the Zimbabwe Electricity Supply Authority are operating members of the Power Pool.

The Electricity Supply Corporation of Malawi, Empresa Nacional de Electricidade, and the Tanzania Electricity Supply Company Ltd are the non-operating members of the Power Pool.

The Copperbelt Energy Corporation is the only Independent Transmission Company of the Power Pool.

== Challenges ==
Despite being the most advanced power pool ever developed in Africa, the SAPP has some challenges and shortcomings. Its takes money to keep the pool running and the SAPP does not have the funds to create new investments. The SAPP also suffers from lack of infrastructure across the continent along with lack of maintenance for the existing infrastructure. By 2007, peak demand began to exceed installed capacity.

One major challenge is the lack of sufficient adequately skilled staff labor and the difficulty of retention of skilled workers. Power pools can only be sustained in areas with developed grid interconnections. The interconnection between some member states are inadequate. Trust between the members is of utmost importance.

== Plans ==
Despite recent challenges, the SAPP have long committed goals that can help in its expansion and company's growth. The following plans are investment projects, interconnected grid, electricity access, and competitive market. Investment projects that creates new revenue includes hydropower and clean coal power plant alternative over nuclear. They also plan to improve SAPP central grid to improve the link between North and South Africa regarding to the new alternative power plant, hydropower and clean coal. Interconnected grids can expand SAPP activities. Along with the current SAPP members, there are plans to involve other areas such as Tanzania, Malawi and Angola. Electricity access would expand the use of electricity to more areas in order to make it accessible to new borders. Lastly, strengthen and regulating competitive markets plan that sets up new rules that help meets consumers and investors satisfaction.

== Other African Power pools ==
There are five African Power Pools, (a) Southern African Power Pool (SAPP), (b) Eastern Africa Power Pool (EAPP) (c) Central African Power Pool (CAPP) (d) West African Power Pool (WAPP) and North African Power Pool (NAPP). The Democratic Republic of the Congo is the only country that is a member of three pools (SAPP, EAPP and CAPP). Burundi is part of EAPP and CAPP. Tanzania is a member of SAPP and EAPP. Guinea is part of CAPP and WAPP.

== See also ==
- Eastern Africa Power Pool
- Central African Power Pool
- West African Power Pool
- North African Power Pool
