= Suswa =

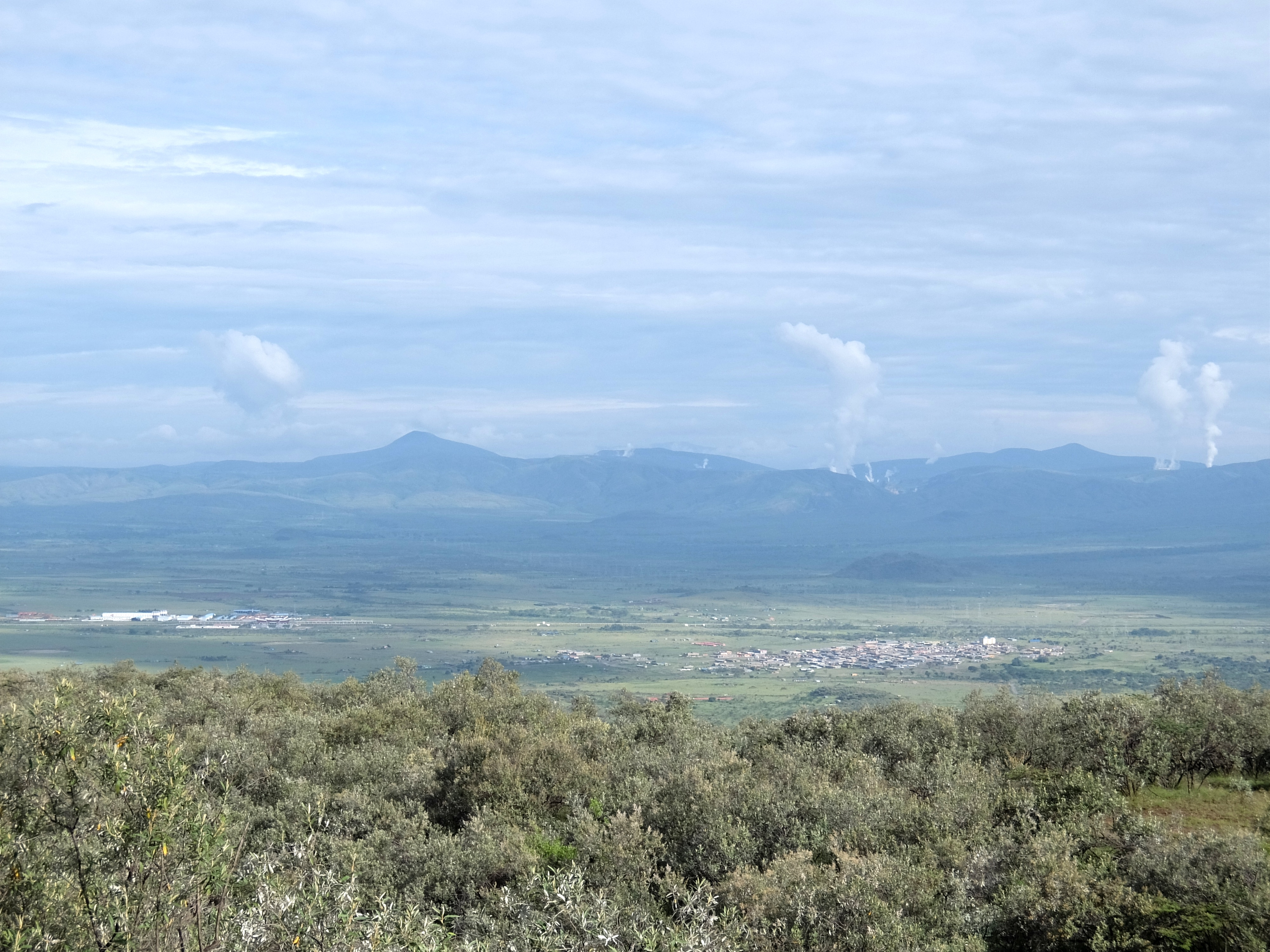
- The town of Suswa seen from Mount Suswa

- Location in Kenya
- Coordinates: 1.04948°S 36.33352°E
- Country: Kenya
- County: Narok County
- Time zone: UTC+3 (EAT)

Suswa is a small town along the main road from Nairobi to Narok town and at the foot of Mount Suswa in Narok County. Suswa is also a ward in Narok East sub-county. The Suswa sub-station is located just outside town and electricity that is generated at Lake Turkana Wind Power Station is transmitted here through the 428 km Loiyangalani–Suswa High Voltage Power Line.

The town is a tourism hotspot due to its proximity to the Mount Suswa Conservancy and the lava caves on Mount Suswa.

== Transport ==
=== SGR ===
Suswa is served by a train station on the Nairobi–Malaba Standard Gauge Railway (SGR), which was inaugurated in October 2019.

=== MGR ===
There is an old unused railway station called Suswa station located along the old Metre Gauge Railway (MGR) section from Nairobi to Naivasha. Although it is named Suswa station, it is located 46 kilometres (by road) away from Suswa town between Mount Longonot and Naivasha Town.
