= Nkenda–Fort Portal–Hoima High Voltage Power Line =

Power line in Uganda

Location
- Country: Uganda
- Coordinates: 00°44′06″N 30°13′41″E
- General direction: South to North
- From: Nkenda, Uganda
- Passes through: Fort Portal
- To: Kabaale, Uganda

Ownership information
- Owner: Government of Uganda
- Partners: Government of France and Government of Norway
- Operator: Uganda Electricity Transmission Company Limited

Construction information
- Contractors: KEC International
- Construction started: Beginning 2016
- Commissioned: 14 August 2018

Technical information
- Current type: AC
- Total length: 226 km (140 mi)
- AC voltage: 220kV
- No. of circuits: 2

The Nkenda–Fort Portal–Hoima High Voltage Power Line is a high voltage electricity power line, in operation, connecting the high voltage substation at Nkenda, Kasese District, to another high voltage substation at Kabaale, Buseruka sub-county, Hoima District, all in the Western Region of Uganda.

== Location ==
The 220 kilo Volt power line starts at the 220kV substation a Nkenda, in Kasese District, approximately 10 kilometres (6 mi), by road, north of Kasese, the district headquarters, and nearest large town. The line travels in a north-easterly direction, through Fort Portal, in Kabarole District, to end at Kabaale, in Buseruka sub-county, in Hoima District, a total distance of approximately 226 kilometres (140 mi).

== Overview ==
This power line is planned to evacuate the power from a number of mini-hydro power projects in the Western Region districts of Bundibugyo, Bunyangabu, Kasese, Hoima and Masindi. It is also planned to evacuate power from the proposed Nzizi Thermal Power Station. The power that this power line evacuates is sold to the Uganda Electricity Transmission Company Limited and integrated into the national electric grid.

== Construction ==
KEC International is the main contractor for this project. The supervising engineering company is "Ficthner Gmbh". The contract for construction of the associated substations was awarded to "Shan-dong Taikai Power Engineering Company Limited. The government of Norway donated US$54 million towards the completion of this project. In 2013, the Ugandan government borrowed US$23 million from the French Development Agency to finance this power line. Construction began in 2016, with completion in July 2018 and public commissioning on 14 August 2018.

== See also ==
- Energy in Uganda
- List of power stations in Uganda
