= Energy in Tanzania =

Total energy supply by source, 2021
1. Coal (1.87%)
2. Oil (13.9%)
3. Biofuels and waste (77.3%)
4. Natural gas (5.86%)
5. Wind, solar, etc. (0.02%)
6. Hydro (1.03%)

Energy in Tanzania is fundamental to the nation's projected economic growth, with estimates indicating that the economy could expand sevenfold by 2040, while energy demand is expected to increase by only 150% due to advancements in fuel efficiency. The country is actively enhancing its energy mix, primarily relying on natural gas for more than half of its electricity generation and significant contributions from hydropower, with oil primarily used for backup power. Tanzania has a wide range of energy resources in abundance, which are not yet fully exploited. These include wood fuel, other biomass fuels, hydropower, natural gas, coal, wind, geothermal, uranium and solar.

== Energy production and consumption ==
Biomass constitutes over 90 percent of the country's primary energy consumption. This accounts for deforestation of 100,000 hectares (390 mi^{2}) annually. Reforestation restores only about 25 percent of that annually. As of April 2020, 73.2 percent of Tanzania's urban areas and 24.5 percent of her rural areas have access to electricity.

By 2021, the total energy production in Tanzania increased slightly to 1,076,899 TJ. Biofuels and waste continued to dominate the energy profile, constituting roughly 77.3% of the total production. There was an increase in the production of natural gas, which rose to 5.86%. Oil's share increased to 13.92%, while coal's contribution rose significantly to 1.87%. Hydroelectric power saw a slight decrease, contributing approximately 1.03%, and the contribution from wind, solar, and other renewables remained constant at around 0.016%.

== Renewable energy ==
Tanzania has a large untapped renewable energy potential. Of the country's total generation capacity, close to 80% of Tanzania electricity comes from renewable energy, with natural gas contributing 892.72 MW and Hydro electric power 573.70 MW of the total 1,601.84 megawatts, as of April 2020. According to the government of Tanzania, generation projects in the pipeline include: (a) Ruhudji (358 MW), Kakono (87 MW), Rumakali (222MW), Malagarasi (45 MW), Kikonge (300 MW), Kinyerezi I Extension (185 MW) and Mtwara (300 MW).

Solar power is widely used in rural areas, with 65 percent of rural households with access to electricity using solar energy sources.

Total renewable energy capacity 2014–2023 (MW)
2014	2015	2016	2017	2018	2019	2020	2021	2022	2023	2024
654	660	667	673	683	682	687	691	692	773	1478

The inauguration of the Nyerere Hydropower Plant has increased Tanzania's electricity generation capacity. Prior to this development, the country's capacity stood at approximately 1900 MW. With the new plant, the total capacity has risen to over 2115 MW.

== Electricity ==
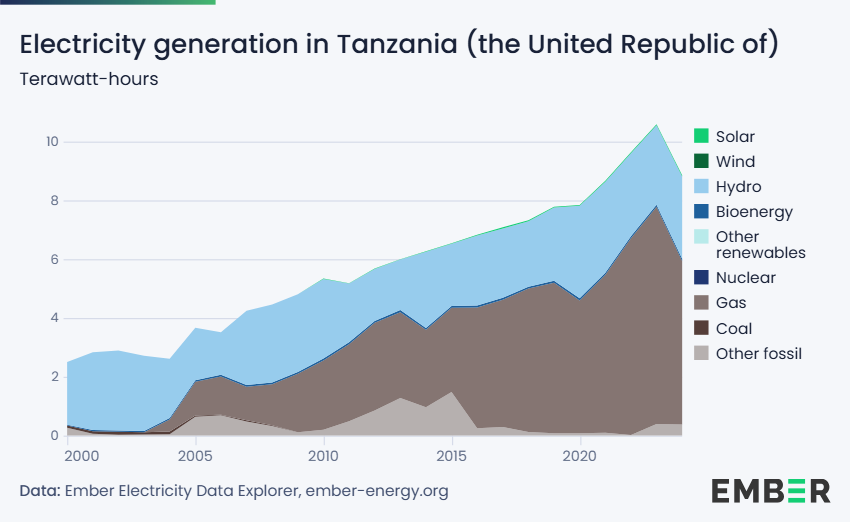
Electricity generation in Tanzania in terawatt-hours

As of 2020, Tanzania's electricity generation capacity was 1,601.84 MW, with natural gas accounting for 55.7%, hydropower 35.8%, heavy fuel oil 5.5%, and biomass 0.6%. The country has significant untapped renewable energy potential, particularly in hydropower and solar energy.

As of July 2020, Tanzania had installed grid generation capacity of 1,601.84 megawatts. The table below illustrates the generation mix as of then, in the Tanzanian national grid.

Sources of electricity in Tanzania as of July 2020
Rank	Source	Quantity (MW)	Percentage of Total
1	Natural gas	892.72	55.7
2	Hydroelectricity	573.70	35.8
3	Heavy fuel oil	88.80	5.5
4	Biomass	10.50	0.6
5	Wind	0	0.0
6	Geothermal	0	0.0
7	Nuclear	0	0.0
8	Other	0	0.0
	Total	1,601.84	100.00

*Note 1: Totals are slightly off due to rounding.
*Note 2: The hydroelectric figures exclude 2,115 MW from Julius Nyerere Hydropower Station and 50 MW from Malagarasi Hydroelectric Power Station, both still under development.

The electrical supply varies, particularly when droughts disrupt hydropower electric generation; rolling blackouts are implemented as necessary. Nearly a quarter of electricity generated is lost because of poor transmission infrastructure. The unreliability of the electrical supply has hindered the development of Tanzanian industry.

== Dar es Salaam ==
Dar es Salaam is a key area in the supply chain of petroleum products across Tanzania and as an emerging industrial zone, the port attracts major international companies. A major supplier of petroleum products in the region is Dalbit Petroleum who rely on the port as part of their operations and have developed a well-organized supply chain through the port since the company’s regional inception in 2007.

== Way forward ==
In 2016, the Energy Access Situation Survey indicated that "32.8 percent of the households in the Tanzania Mainland were connected to electricity", as of that year. Demand for connection was growing at 10 to 15 percent annually.

A major objective was achieved in 2015, when the country phased out emergency generation centers using "high-cost" liquid fossil fuels. The completion of the Mtwara–Dar es Salaam Natural Gas Pipeline, with commissioning in October that year ensures a constant supply of natural gas to meet generation requirements of the large gas power stations in the country's largest city. The Tanzanian government aims to reach generation capacity of at least 5,000 megawatts in the medium term and 10,000 megawatts in the long term.

While the country's offshore gas reserves discovered by Shell and Equinor have remained undeveloped for many years, new political leadership since 2021 has given hope that Tanzania may become an exporter of LNG by 2030. As of 2022, negotiations were back on the table to develop the 10 million tonnes per annum Tanzania Liquefied Natural Gas Terminal, with final investment decision (FID), expected in 2025. The projected cost is US$30 billion.

== See also ==
- Ministry of Energy and Minerals
- Tanzania Atomic Energy Commission
- Tanzania Electric Supply Company Limited
- List of power stations in Tanzania
