= Energy in Kenya =

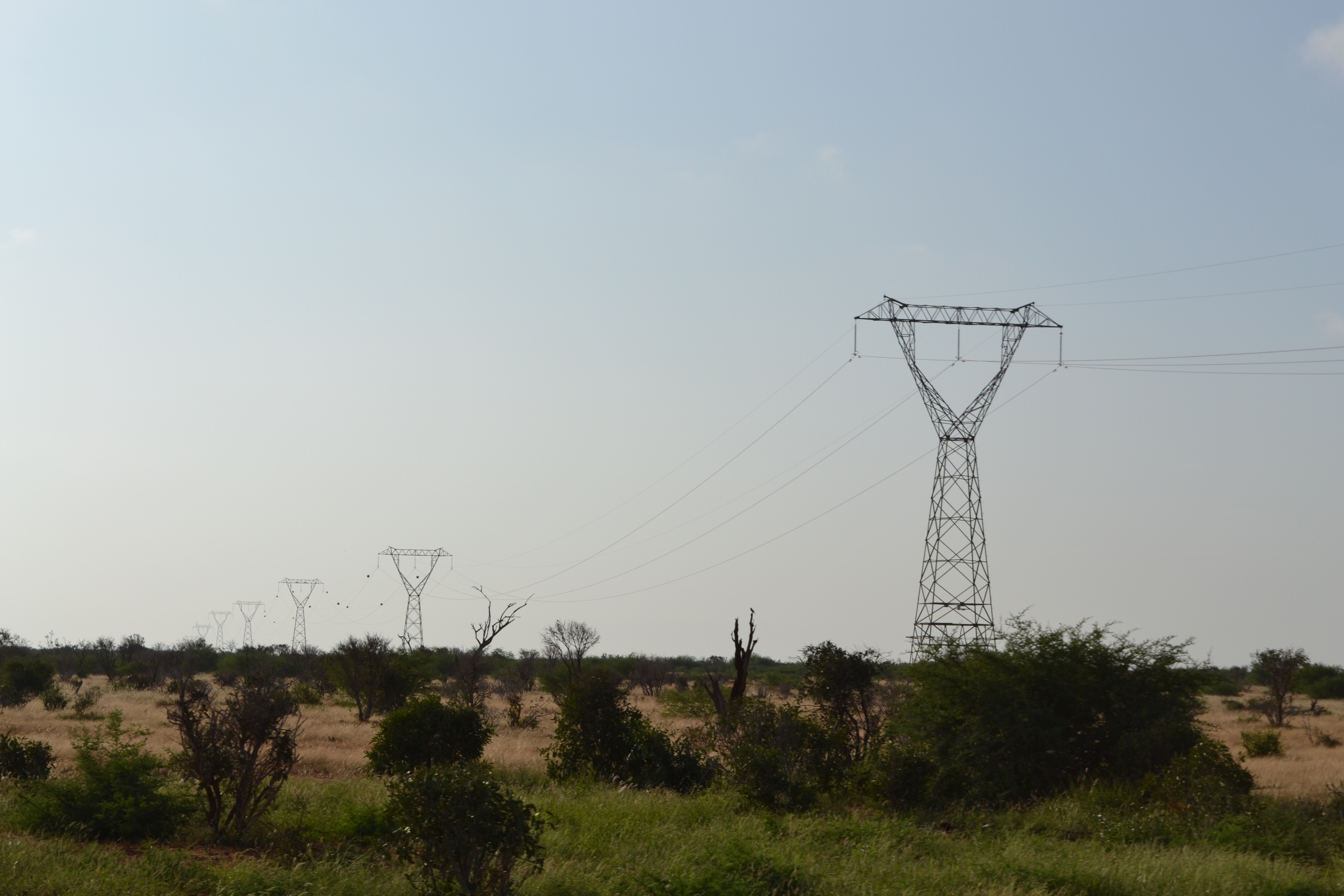
Electricity transmission in Kenya

This article describes energy and electricity production, consumption, import and export in Kenya. Kenya's current effective installed (grid connected) electricity capacity is 2,651 megawatts (MW), with peak demand of 1,912 MW, as of November 2019. At that time, demand was rising at a calculated rate of 3.6 percent annually, given that peak demand was 1,770 MW, at the beginning of 2018. Electricity supply is mostly generated by renewable sources with the majority coming from geothermal power and hydroelectricity.

Until recently, the country lacked significant domestic reserves of fossil fuel. The country has over the years had to import substantial amounts of crude oil and natural gas. This might change with the discovery of oil reserves in Kenya, which relied on oil imports to meet about 42 percent of its energy needs in 2010. As of the end of 2021, 76.5% of Kenyans were connected to the National grid, which is one of the highest connection rates in Sub-Saharan Africa. Per capita consumption in domestic households however, remains low.

== Electricity Production ==
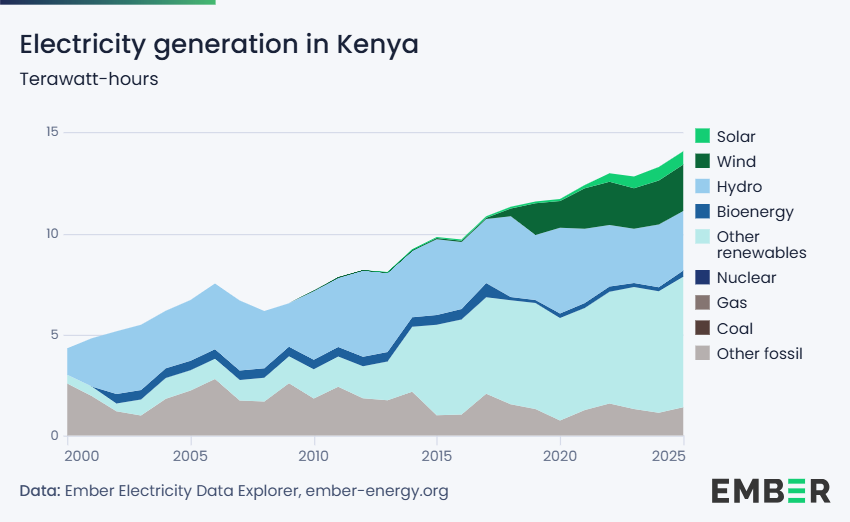
Electricity generation in Kenya in terawatt-hours

=== Sources of electricity ===
Kenya's electricity mix
Source (as of 2024)	Total Installed Capacity (MW)	Generation %
Geothermal	943	26.37%
Hydro	872.4	29.7%
Wind	436.1	12.19%
Thermal	636	17.78%
Solar	443	12.38%
Waste Heat Recover Cycle	83.5	2.33%
Bioenergy	163.8	4.58%
Total	3778.5	100%

=== Renewable energy ===
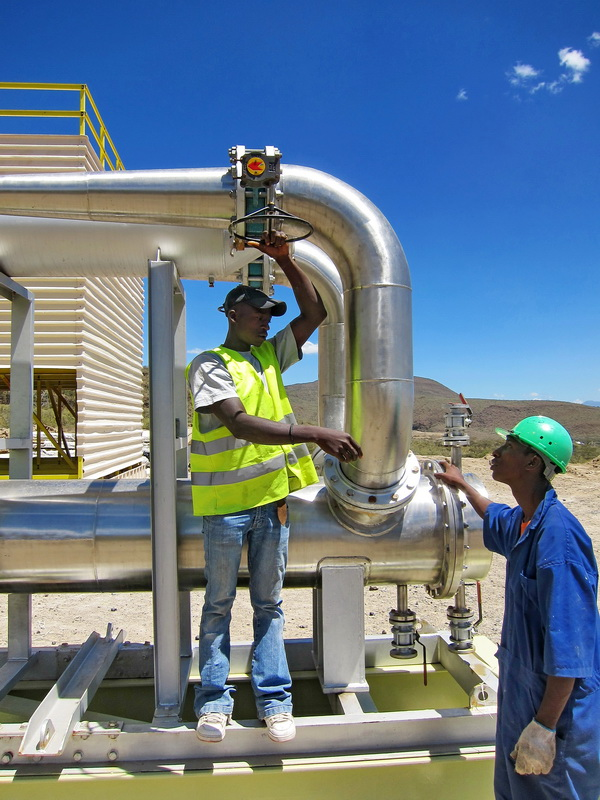
Worker at Olkaria Geothermal Plant

Kenya is currently the largest producer of geothermal energy in Africa. It is one of two countries in Africa that produce geothermal energy, the other being Ethiopia. In 2010, geothermal energy accounted for almost 20 percent of Kenya's total electricity generation. The country has the potential to produce 10,000 megawatts of geothermal-powered electricity, according to Kenya's state-owned Geothermal Development Company. Total renewable energy capacity is at 60%, with most coming from hydropower. In July 2019, Kenya opened Lake Turkana Wind Power (LTWP) which is the largest wind power plant in Africa. This project is part of the country's ambitious plan of reaching 100% green energy by 2020.

=== Utilities ===
External image
- Kenya grid map, present and planned

The bulk of electricity is transmitted by Kenya Electricity Transmission Company.

In Kenya, there are plans by the government of Kenya, to end the monopoly of the electricity distribution market; but until that happens, power distribution is only held by one company; Kenya Power and Lighting Company (Kenya Power).

However, Kenya Electricity Generating Company (KenGen), is responsible for generating approximately 90% of installed capacity. Independent Power Producers (IPPs) are responsible for about 10% of installed capacity. The following IPPs are active in Kenya: (a) Westmont (b) AEP Energy Africa (Iberafrica) (c) OrPower4 Kenya Limited (a subsidiary of Ormat Technologies) (d) Tsavo Power Company (e) Aggreko (f) Africa Geothermal International

=== Consumption ===
The biggest consumer of electricity in Kenya is Kenya Pipeline Company, followed by Bamburi Cement. As of July 2018, of the 6.5 million Kenya Power's customers, 5 percent or 348,459, were commercial customers (including businesses and factories). Of these, the largest 6,000, were responsible for 60 percent of the national power consumption, averaging in excess of 15,000 electricity units per month. Peak consumption around 1,830 MW often occurs 1940hrs while baseload (minimum demand) of about 900MW happens at 3:30 am. Average electricity consumption per citizen is 167 kilowatt hours (kWh) per year. From November 2018, households and businesses consuming less than 100 kWh/month pay a subsidized rate of KSh.10/= per kWh.

=== Future ===
==== Sources of electricity ====
One estimate of projected electricity supply and demand as follows:

Projected Generation Capacity and Demand of Electricity in Kenya
Year	Demand	Capacity
2013	1,191 MW	1,600 MW
2018	1,802	2,351 MW
2030	15,000 MW	19,201 MW

==== Projected generation mix according to nuclear agency ====
OBS: Not official plan

Source	Capacity (MW)	Capacity %
Geothermal	5,530	26%
Nuclear	4,000	19%
Coal	2,720	13%
GT-NG	2,340	11%
MSD	1,955	9%
Imports	2,000	9%
Wind	2,036	9%
Hydro	1,039	5%
Total	21,620	100%

* Source: International Atomic Energy Agency (IAEA)

==== Rural electrification ====
Karanja describes the role that a coordinated approach to rural electrification can play. Numerical electricity system modeling combined with geographical information can provide useful inputs.

==== Eastern Africa Power Pool (EAPP) ====
Seven countries came together because they saw mutual benefit in having one power pool. The original countries were (a) Burundi (b) Democratic Republic of the Congo (c) Egypt (d) Ethiopia (e) Kenya (f) Rwanda and (g) Sudan.

Later, more countries joined the pool: (a) Tanzania (b) Libya (c) Djibouti and (d) Uganda.

The objective of the Eastern Africa Power Pool (EAPP) is to increase the volume and reduce the cost of electricity supply in Kenya; and to provide revenues to Ethiopia through the export of electricity from Ethiopia to Kenya. The process of connecting the Ethiopian grid to the Kenyan grid is underway via the Sodo–Moyale–Suswa High Voltage Power Line.

Kenya also plans to be connected to the South African grid, through Tanzania, Zambia and Zimbabwe. That process is also underway as of July 2018, via the Isinya–Singida High Voltage Power Line.

==== Geothermal power ====
Geothermal power plants, which convert steam generated from hot rocks deep underground into electricity, have a prominent place in Kenya's overarching development plans. These include the Vision 2030, the NCCAP, and the current ‘5000+ MW in 40 months initiative’. Geothermal power has the potential to provide reliable, cost-competitive, baseload power with a small carbon footprint, and reduces vulnerability to climate by diversifying power supply away from hydropower, which currently provides the majority of Kenya's electricity. Kenya has set out ambitious targets for geothermal energy. It aims to expand its geothermal power production capacity to 5,000 MW by 2030, with a medium-term target of installing 1887 MW by 2017. As of October 2014, Kenya has an installed geothermal capacity of approximately 340 MW. Although there is significant political will and ambition, reaching these ambitions is a major challenge. Kenya Electricity Generating Company (KenGen) and Geothermal Development Company aim at raising the country's geothermal output from the current 593 MW, to 1 GW by 2018, and 5 GW to the grid by 2030.

==== Nuclear power ====
In 2017, the Kenya Nuclear Electrification Board (Kneb) estimated that a 1,000 MW nuclear plant could be operational by 2027 and cost KSh.500 – 600 billion/= (US$5 – 6 billion) located at either the Indian Ocean, Lake Victoria or Lake Turkana.

In September 2010 former Energy and Petroleum Ministry PS Patrick Nyoike announced, that Kenya aimed to build a 1,000 MW Nuclear power plant between 2017 and 2022. For Kenya to achieve middle-income status, Nyoike viewed nuclear energy as the best way to produce safe, clean, reliable and base load (constant supply) electricity. The projected cost using South Korean technology was US$3.5 billion.

== Petroleum ==
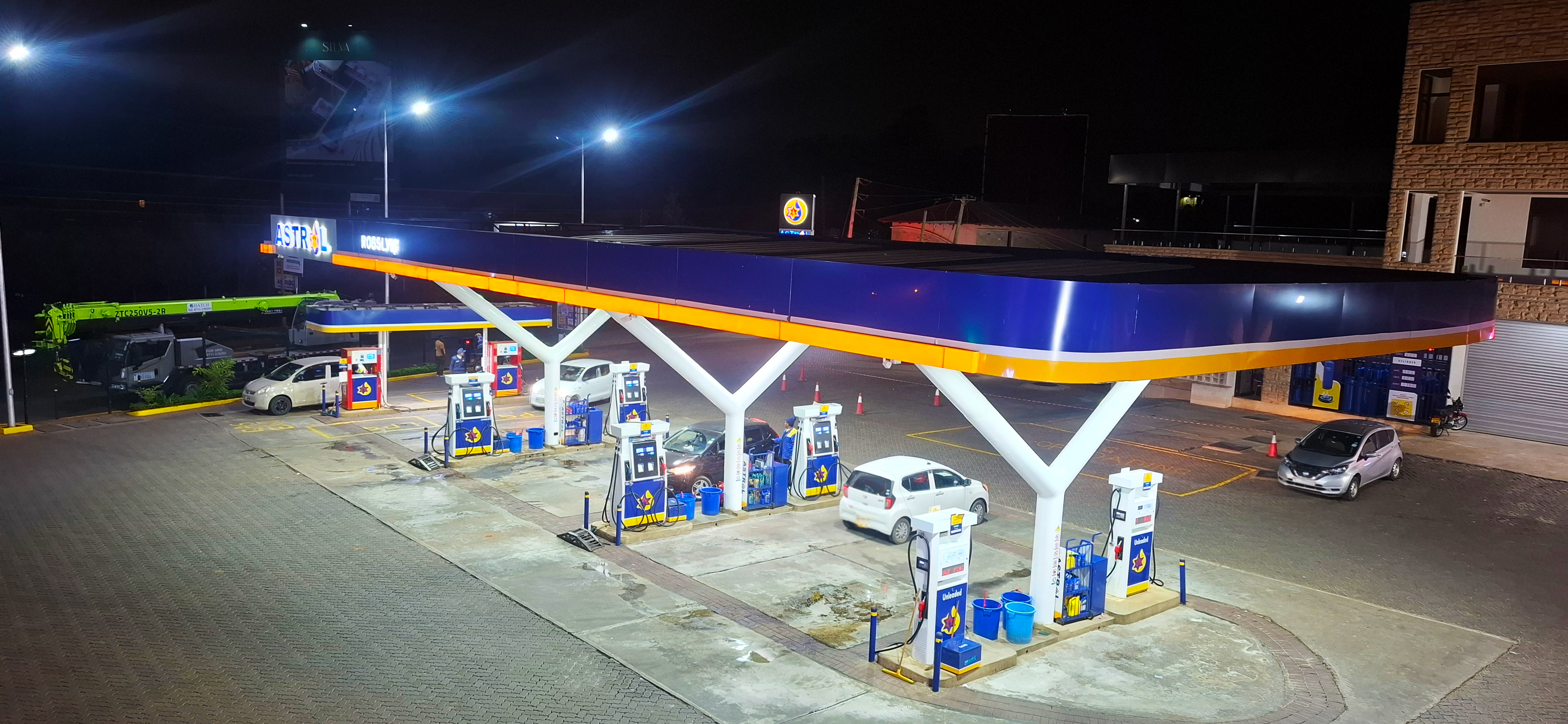
Astrol Petrol Station on Red Hill Link Road, Rosslyn - Nairobi

=== Consumption ===
In 2017, Kenya consumed 2,480 megalitres (655,146,690 US gal), of diesel fuel. The same year, the country used 1,672.8 megalitres (441,907,009 US gal), of refined petrol. The monthly figures are 213 million litres of diesel, 150 million litres petrol, and 39 million litres kerosene.

=== Imports ===
In 2011, Kenya imported about 33,000 bbl (5,200 m^{3}) per day of crude oil entirely from the United Arab Emirates, according to the Kenya National Bureau of Statistics (KNBS). Kenya imported 51,000 bbl (8,100 m^{3}) per day of refined oil products in 2011, according to KNBS. Kenya has a product pipeline system that transports petroleum products from Mombasa to inland areas.

Kenya had one of the largest crude oil refineries in East Africa, the 90,000 bbl (14,000 m^{3}) per day Mombasa refinery. The refinery typically operated below capacity and processed Murban heavy crude from Abu Dhabi and other heavy Middle-Eastern crude grades. The refinery was shut down in February 2016.

=== Reserves ===
In 2012, oil was discovered in Kenya. As of May 2016, proven reserves were estimated at 766 million barrels. This puts Kenya ahead of Uzbekistan in the global rankings. Tullow Oil, one of the companies prospecting for oil in the country, is of the opinion that the national reserves are in excess of 1 billion barrels.

=== Production ===
After the collapse of negotiations to build the Uganda-Kenya Crude Oil Pipeline, Kenya began to make plans to build the 892 km (554 mi) Kenya Crude Oil Pipeline (costing $1.1 billion or KSh.110 billion/=) on its own, expected in 2022. Turkana oil is expected to be produced at 13,000 m^{3} (80,000 bbl) per day, so Kenya expects not to build an oil refinery, as that would require 64,000 m^{3} (400,000 bbl) per day to operate commercially.

== Challenges ==
Fuelwood demand in the country is 3.5 million tonnes per year, while its supply is 1.5 million tonnes per year. The massive deficit in fuelwood supply has led to high rates of deforestation in both exotic and indigenous vegetation, resulting in adverse environmental effects such as desertification, land degradation, droughts and famine.

== Carbon emissions ==
Kenya emits .03 percent of the world carbon dioxide, which is about 12.62 (million metric tons of CO_{2}).

== See also ==
- Kenya Electricity Generating Company
- List of power stations in Kenya
- Renewable energy in Kenya
