= Nile Basin Initiative =

Partnership among the Nile riparian states

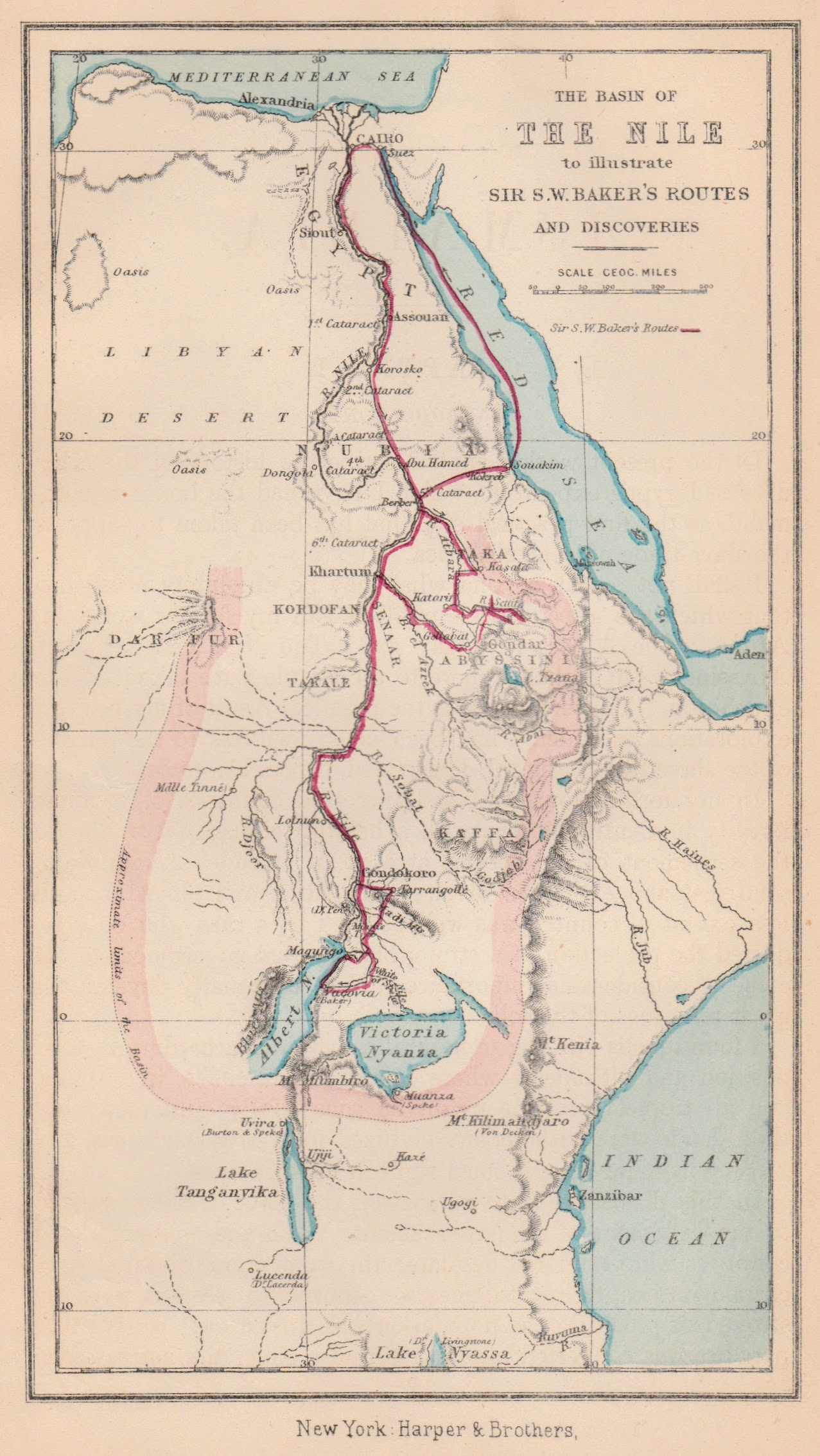
The Basin of the Nile River

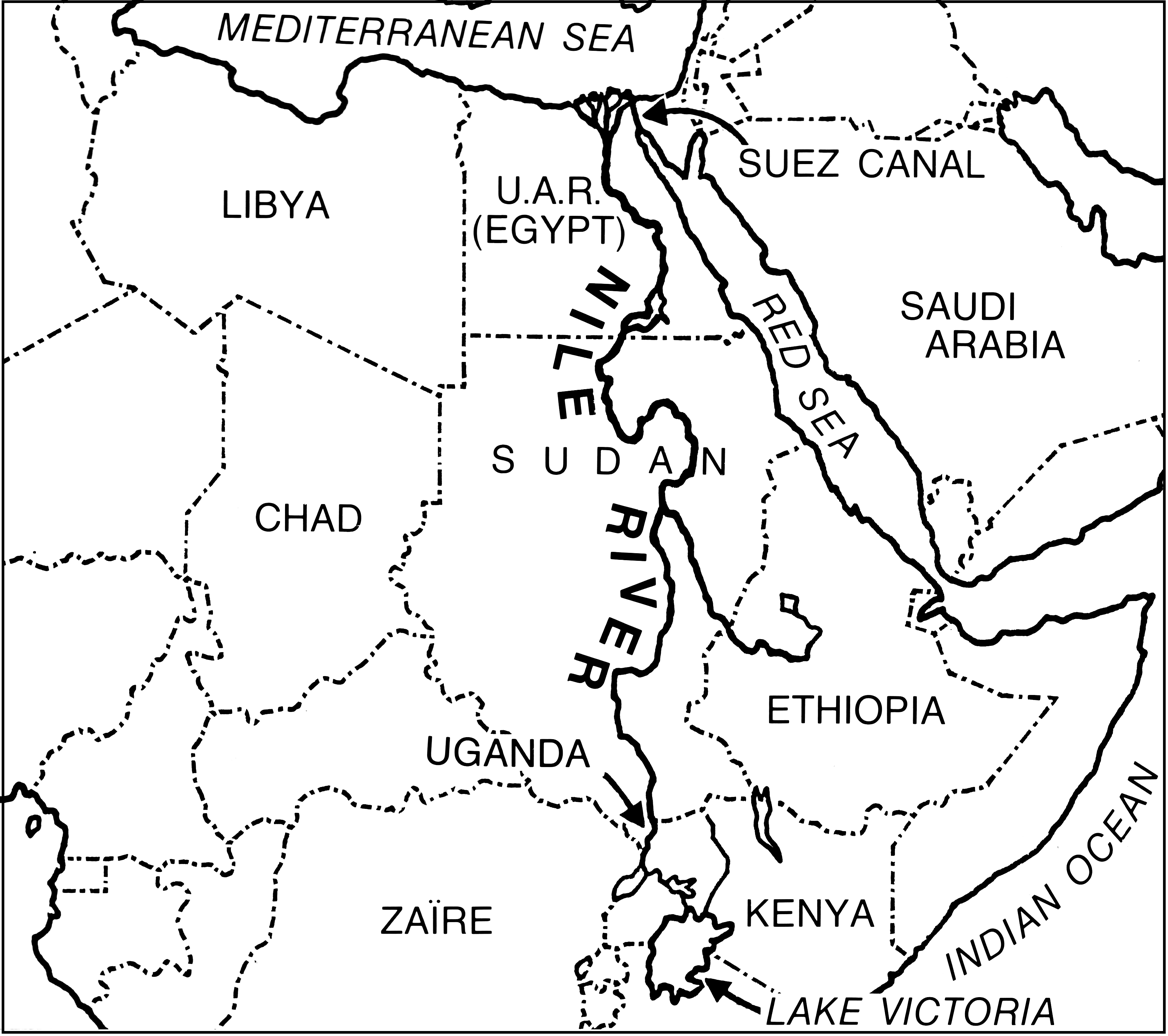
Map of River Nile

The Nile Basin Initiative (NBI) is a partnership among the Nile riparian states that “seeks to develop the river in a cooperative manner, share substantial socioeconomic benefits, and promote regional peace and security”. The NBI began with a dialogue among the riparian states that resulted in a shared vision objective “to achieve sustainable socioeconomic development through the equitable utilization of, and benefit from, the common Nile Basin water resources." It was formally launched in February 1999 by the water ministers of nine countries that share the river: Egypt, Sudan, Ethiopia, Uganda, Kenya, Tanzania, Burundi, Rwanda, the Democratic Republic of Congo (DRC), as well as Eritrea as an observer. From its beginning the Nile Basin Initiative has been supported by the World Bank and by other external partners. The World Bank has a mandate to support the work of the NBI, as lead development partner and as administrator of the multi-donor Nile Basin Trust Fund. One of the partners is the "Nile Basin Discourse", which describes itself as "a civil society network of organisations seeking to achieve positive influence over the development of projects and programmes under the Nile Basin Initiative".

In May 2010, five upstream states signed a Cooperative Framework Agreement (CFA) to seek more water from the River Nile and establish water sharing rights between the NBI states — a move strongly opposed by Egypt and Sudan. Ethiopia, Kenya, Uganda, Rwanda and Tanzania were original signatories with Burundi signing in February 2011. The agreement was subsequently ratified by Ethiopia, Rwanda, Tanzania, Uganda, and Burundi between 2013 and 2023, with South Sudan ratifying the CFA on 8 July 2024. The DRC abstained, while Egypt and Sudan refused to sign on after decrying the CFA as an attempt to diminish their shares of Nile water. Despite these objections, the CFA officially became legally binding over the NBI states on 13 October 2024.

== Institutional framework ==
The NBI institutional framework consists of three key institutions:

- The Nile Council of Ministers of Water Affairs provides policy guidance and makes decisions. Its Chairpersonship is on a rotational one-year basis. The host of the regular council meetings is traditionally elected as the Chair for the forthcoming year. Since June 2010 the chair is Asfaw Dingamo, Ethiopia’s Minister of Water Resources, elected at the 18th regular meeting in Addis Ababa in June 2010. He was preceded by Egypt’s Minister of Water Resources and Irrigation, Mohamed Nasr el Din Allam (2009–10), elected at the 17th regular meeting in Alexandria in July 2009, as well as Jose Endundu, Minister Of Environment of the Democratic Republic of Congo (2008–09) and Minister Of Water and Environment of Uganda, Maria Mutagamba (2007–2008). The council holds regular annual meetings as well as extraordinary meetings. Extraordinary meetings were held in May 2009 in Kinshasa and in April 2010 in Sharm el-Sheikh.
- The NBI Technical Advisory Committee, established in 1998. It is made up of senior civil servants and provides technical advice and assistance to the Council of Ministers. The committee is made up of one representative from each riparian country and one alternate. It meets two to three times a year.
- The NBI Secretariat, established in 1999 provides administrative support to the Council of Ministers and the Technical Advisory Committee. It is based in Entebbe, Uganda, headed by an Executive Director. The position is on a rotational basis for a 2-year term. The current Executive Director, Teferra Beyene Asfaw from Ethiopia, assumed office in September 2012.

Two subsidiary programs are managed by the Eastern Nile Regional Technical Office (ENTRO), which is based in Addis Ababa, and the NELSAP Coordinating Unit (NELSAP-CU), which is based in Kigali, Rwanda. In addition, various projects under the Share Vision Program have regional project management units located in Cairo (applied training), Addis Ababa (water resources planning), Dar es-Salaam (power trade) and Nairobi (agriculture).

== Main programs ==
The NBI consists of three main programs: The Shared Vision Program, the Eastern Nile Subsidiary Action Program and the Nile Equatorial Lakes Subsidiary Action Program.

=== The Shared Vision Program ===
The Shared Vision Program (SVP), “a Basin-wide program that focuses on building institutions, sharing data and information, providing training and creating avenues for dialogue and region-wide networks needed for joint problem-solving, collaborative development, and developing multi-sector and multi-country programs of investment to develop water resources in a sustainable way.” It is financed through grants and aims to foster trust to build an enabling environment for investment. In 2010 it included the following eight projects mainly focused on regional training:

- an Applied Training Project that provides training in Integrated Water Resources Management;
- a Confidence-Building and Stakeholder Involvement Project that "is working to increase the involvement of a broad range of stakeholders—from policy and decision makers, to small business men and women, to fishermen and farmers, to religious and youth groups";
- a Regional Power Trade Project;
- a Transboundary Environmental Action Project that "provides training in environmental management and monitoring, water quality monitoring, and wetlands conservation";
- an Efficient Water Use for Agriculture Project;
- a Water Resources Management Project;
- a Socio-economic and Benefits Sharing Project that builds a "network of professionals from economic planning and research institutions, technical experts from both the public and private sectors, academics, sociologists, and representatives from civic groups and NGOs";
- a Shared Vision Coordination Project.

=== The Eastern Nile Subsidiary Action Program ===
The Eastern Nile Subsidiary Action Program (ENSAP) "seeks to develop the water resources of the Eastern Nile Basin in a sustainable and equitable way to ensure prosperity, security and peace for all its peoples". It is managed by the Eastern Nile Technical Regional Office (ENTRO) based in Addis Ababa, Ethiopia. It is grouped into fast-track investments and more complex, longer-term multi-purpose track investments.

==== Fast-track investments ====
This track included four projects in early 2008:

The Regional Watershed Management Project aims to establish sustainable management of watersheds on the Tekeze, Atbara, Mareb, Abbay/Blue Nile and the Baro/Akobo/Sobat rivers in Ethiopia and Sudan. The initial project sites identified include Lake Nasser/Nubia in Egypt; Jamma, Reb, and Gumara sub-basins, as well as watershed management in Tana-Beles as part of the Tana-Beles Integrated Water Resources Development Project in Ethiopia; and the lower Atbara, Ingessena Mountains and areas around Dinder National Park in Sudan.

The Ethiopia Power Export Project (formerly called the Ethiopia-Sudan Internconnection Project) will connect the power grids of Ethiopia and Sudan to facilitate cross-border energy trade and optimize existing and planned generation capacity. It aims to overcome the severe electricity shortage in both countries. The World Bank is providing a US$41 million credit for investments in Ethiopia approved in 2007. The Government of Sudan is funding activities in Sudan.

The Regional Irrigation and Drainage Project aims to develop and expand irrigated agriculture and improve the productivity of existing agriculture through more efficient use of water. It consists of three national sub-projects:

- Egypt West Delta Water Conservation and Irrigation Rehabilitation Project supported by a US$145 million loan from the World Bank approved in 2007
- Ethiopia Irrigation and Drainage Project, supported by a US$100 million World Bank subsidized credit approved in 2007, including for investments in the Reb and Magech drainage areas in the Amhara Region (Lake Tana basin).
- Sudan Upper Atbara Irrigation Project

The Flood Preparedness and Early Warning Project, a US$4 million project approved in 2007 with an expected duration of three years, will focus on building flood forecasting capabilities and flood emergency preparedness and response. This will include efforts to improve dissemination of flood warning information to communities at risk, strengthen existing institutions and mechanisms to alert communities; establish community-based plans to reduce flood damages and capture environmental benefits; deliver public education programs; and develop regional and local emergency preparedness and response plans.

==== Multi-purpose track ====
The multi-purpose track includes a series of studies aimed at developing common analytical tools, as well as a tentative plan for coordinated investments called the Joint Multipurpose Program.

===== Development of common analytical tools =====
Specific common analytical tools will be developed for the power sector, watershed management and irrigation/drainage, integrated by an overall planning model.

- The Watershed Management Cooperative Regional Assessment is considered by the World Bank to be a critical building block for determining future regional watershed investments. The study will build a shared information base from which to assess impacts of different land management interventions on a regional scale. This assessment will include a transboundary analysis of the Eastern Nile watershed system and associated livelihoods and analyze how benefits accrue across the three countries under alternative watershed management interventions.
- The Eastern Nile Power Trade Investment Project is part of the overall effort to promote regional power trade by coordinating the planning and development of power projects and transmission interconnection across the three Eastern Nile countries. This study includes an assessment of the scope and potential of an Eastern Nile power market, potential power generation options in the three countries, potential sites for transmission interconnection, and potential power trading arrangements.
- The Irrigation and Drainage Cooperative Regional Assessment includes both regional studies of irrigation and development opportunities, as well as engineering studies of specific sites. The regional study seeks to develop guidelines for selection of projects of regional interest, quantify the benefits and costs of irrigation projects from national and regional perspectives, and explore institutional and legislative reform options to harmonize the approach to rural development and facilitate regional cooperation.
- The Eastern Nile Planning Model Project is intended to help Egypt, Ethiopia and Sudan identify, prepare, and implement cooperative development projects that benefit all three countries.

===== Joint Multipurpose Program =====
The Joint Multipurpose Program (JMP) is a long-term program with a 25-30 year horizon that includes a coordinated set of investments to ensure the sustainable development and management of shared Eastern Nile waters, including the Abbay (Blue Nile), Tekeze (Setit)-Atbara, Baro-Akobo-Sobat, portions of the White Nile and the Main Nile. The first set of investments under the program is likely to include:

- Watershed and environmental management, including reforestation, river bank erosion control, and creation of alternative livelihoods.
- Linking river and power systems through an infrastructure backbone including a regional power grid and increase capacity for water storage for flood control, hydropower, irrigation and water conservation. Other potential benefits include improved inland navigation, more productive fisheries and sufficient flows of water to maintain critical ecosystems.
- Enhancing agricultural production through intensified and expanded irrigated agriculture, coupled with targeted investments in agribusiness, marketing, and other agricultural support services. Improved watershed management would also help expand rainwater harvesting, improve livestock productivity, and promote fisheries development.
- Complementary investments to leverage growth and promote regional integration, such as in telecommunications, transport, industry, tourism, and credit systems.
- Establishing institutions for joint action, including innovative approaches to financing, shared information systems, and improved public communication and transparency.

=== The Nile Equatorial Lakes Subsidiary Action Program ===
The Nile Equatorial Lakes Subsidiary Action Program (NELSAP) “is an investment program under the Nile Basin Initiative (NBI). Its mission is to help reduce poverty, promote economic growth, and reverse environmental degradation.” NELSAP programs fall under two broad program areas: Natural Resources Management and Development, and Power Development and Trade.

==== Natural Resources Management and Development ====
This program area includes the following projects:

- The Kagera Transboundary Integrated Water Resources Management and Development project launched in December 2005. The project is shared between Burundi, Tanzania, Rwanda and Uganda.
- The Mara Transboundary Integrated Water Resources Management and Development project in the Mara and the Serengeti national parks launched effective January 2006. It is shared between Tanzania and Kenya.
- The Sio-Malaba-Malakisi Transboundary Integrated Water Resources Management and Development project shared by Kenya and Uganda focuses on promoting development and reducing conflicts between communities using water resources of the three sub basins fed from the slopes of Mount Elgon. The project was launched in January 2006.
- The Lake Edward and Lake Albert Fisheries Pilot Project in Uganda and the Democratic Republic of Congo, including small-scale community-level investments to improve protection of water catchment areas, build access roads, and supply drinking water and sanitation. The project was launched in June 2005 and was scheduled to be completed in 2007. The African Development Bank is providing financial support for this project.
- The Abatement of the Water Hyacinth on the Kagera River Project, part of the Lake Victoria Environmental Management Project in partnership with Burundi, Kenya, Rwanda, Tanzania and Uganda.

==== Power Development and Trade ====
This program area focuses on investment planning and preparation of major investment projects such as a Transmission Interconnection project and the Regional Rusumo Falls Hydro-electric and Multi-purpose Project. This has involved carrying out preliminary feasibility studies and assessments.

In December 2005 the six NELSAP Ministers responsible for Electricity Affairs adopted an Indicative Power Master Plan for the region. The plan includes a set of “best evaluated” power generation options and transmission interconnection projects for the next 20 years, including social and environmental concerns.

The Regional Rusumo Falls Hydroelectric and Multipurpose Project on the Kagera River is expected to be a dam with an associated run-of-the river hydropower plant that is expected to benefit Burundi, Rwanda and Tanzania. The project was identified as one of the best power options through the above-mentioned NELSAP Assessment of Power Development Options. The hydroelectric power component would have an installed capacity of approximately 60-80 megawatts. It is estimated that approximately 3,000 people would need to be resettled around the hydropower plant facility.

The NELSAP Transmission Interconnection feasibility studies include detailed design for four key transmission lines between Burundi, DRC, Kenya, Rwanda and Uganda, supported directly by the African Development Bank. The total cost of the regional transmission lines are about US$160 Million.

== Funding ==
The Nile Basin Initiative is supported by contributions from the NBI countries themselves and through the support of international financial institutions – such as the World Bank, the Global Environmental Facility and the African Development Bank – and other donors. In 2003 a World Bank-managed, multi-donor trust fund created to harmonize donor contributions. Donors that contributed through the Nile Basin Trust Fund until early 2008 include Canada, Denmark, Netherlands, Norway, Sweden and the United Kingdom. Other donors to the NBI include Finland, France, Germany, Italy, Latvia, Estonia, the EU and various UN agencies such as UNDP and the FAO.

Until early 2008 donors have contributed over US$130 million of the original pledge of US$150 million. US$14.4 million has been contributed by the governments of the Nile Basin.

== Initiative by upstream countries to form a Nile River Basin Commission ==
In May 2010, five upstream states signed an agreement to seek more water from the River Nile and establish water sharing rights between the NBI states — a move strongly opposed by Egypt and Sudan. The Cooperative Framework Agreement (CFA), which had been negotiated for years under the framework of the NBI, was to be open for signature for a period of one year. Ethiopia, Kenya, Uganda, Rwanda, Burundi and Tanzania signed the agreement; Ethiopia ratified it in 2013. The DR Congo abstained from signing the agreement, while Egypt and Sudan refused to do so. An Egyptian government spokesman said in May 2010 that "Egypt will not join or sign any agreement that affects its share.

The signing of the agreement had already been planned during a Ministerial meeting in 2007, but had been delayed at the request of Egypt. Upstream countries then decided at another Ministerial meeting in Kinshasa in May 2009 to sign the agreement without having all countries sign at the same time. However, the signing was delayed and at the next Council of Minister meeting in April 2010 in Sharm el-Sheikh, Egypt again asked to defer the signing. The article on water security (Article 14b) has particularly drawn objections from Egypt and Sudan. The article says that member countries would work together to ensure "not to significantly affect the water security of any other Nile Basin State." Egypt and Sudan want the article to read "Not to adversely affect the water security and current uses and rights of any other Nile Basin States" without the qualification "significantly". A former Egyptian minister of water resources and irrigation, Mahmoud Abu-Zeid, sees the framework agreement as a positive beginning, saying that "everybody agreed to more than 95 percent of the articles". An article on the protection and conservation of the basin and its ecosystem – such as the Sudd in Sudan – and an article requiring "prior informed consent" before building new dams had also been controversial during earlier negotiations. Representatives of upstream countries said they were "tired of first getting permission from Egypt before using river Nile water for any development project like irrigation", as required by a treaty signed during the colonial era between Egypt and Britain in 1929, but later on expressed support for Egypt after series of agreements negotiations and trade relations the Nile Basin countries have become closer to Egypt. The agreement, once effective, will transform the NBI into a permanent Nile River Basin Commission.

The agreement was ratified by Ethiopia, Rwanda, Tanzania, Uganda, Burundi, and South Sudan between 2013 and 2024. Despite various objections, the CFA officially became legally binding over the NBI states on 13 October 2024.

== See also ==
- Water politics in the Nile Basin
- United Nations Convention on the Law of Non-Navigational Uses of International Watercourses
