= Kenya Electricity Transmission Company =

Kenyan electricity transmission company

Coordinates: 01°19′29″S 36°49′58″E

Kenya Electricity Transmission Company Limited
- Type: Parastatal
- Industry: Electric utility
- Predecessor: Kenya Power and Lighting Company
- Founded: 2 December 2008; 17 years ago by split
- Founder: Government of Kenya
- Headquarters: Nairobi
- Area served: Kenya
- Key people: Mohamed Abdi Mohamed, Chairperson of the Board of Directors; Eng Kipkemoi Kibias Acting Managing Director
- Products: Electrical power
- Services: Electric power transmission
- Owner: Government of Kenya
- Website: www.ketraco.co.ke

Kenya Electricity Transmission Company Limited, commonly referred to as KETRACO, is a wholly owned parastatal of the Government of Kenya which serves as the primary Transmission System Operator in the Republic of Kenya.

== Overview ==
Prior to the year 2008, the transmission of electricity in large quantities in Kenya was carried out by Kenya Power and Lighting Company, which also handled electricity generation and distribution to the public. As part of efforts to make electricity delivery more efficient, the government incorporated KETRACO in December 2008 with the mandate of taking over the role of bulk electricity transmission in the country as well as maintenance of the National Transmission Grid. It is mandated to "plan, design, construct, own, operate and maintain high voltage electricity transmission grids, as well as the regional interconnectors". It is responsible for high voltage lines and substations with 132kV and above.

KETRACO is responsible for the maintenance of electricity grid networks and transformers with voltages of 132kV, 220kV, 400kV, and 500kV. Additionally, the company is in charge of designing, building, and maintaining interconnectors with neighbouring foreign countries, which enables Kenya to sell to, buy from, or transmit electricity between her neighbours, as well as to participate in the Eastern Africa Power Pool.

As of December 2017, KETRACO had completed the construction of 1,791.5 kilometres (1,113 mi) of high voltage electricity lines in the country. At that time, a total of 2,359 kilometres (1,466 mi) of high voltage electricity lines were under implementation.

On September 19, 2025, the then managing director and CEO Eng. John Mativo was sacked and replaced with Kipkemoi Kibias who was a general manager to be the acting CEO. The reason for his sacking remains unknown.

== Location ==
The headquarters of KETRACO are located at Kawi Complex, Popo Lane, Off Red Cross Road, in the South C neighbourhood of Nairobi, the capital city of Kenya.

== See also ==
- Kenya Electricity Generating Company
