= Mubuku =

- Location in Uganda
- Coordinates: 00°15′41″N 30°07′27″E
- Country: Uganda
- Region: Western Uganda
- Sub-region: Rwenzururu sub-region
- District: Kasese District
- Elevation: 4,360 ft (1,330 m)

Mubuku is a settlement in Uganda.

== Location ==
Mubuku is located approximately 16 kilometres (9.9 mi), by road, north of the town of Kasese, where the district headquarters are located. This location lies approximately 14 kilometres (8.7 mi), by road, southwest of the town of Hima, the nearest urban center. The coordinates of Lira are:0° 15' 41.00"N, 30° 7' 27.00"E (Latitude:0.261390; Longitude:30.124167). The town sits at altitude of 1,330 metres (4,360 ft), above sea level.

== Overview ==
Mubuku lies on the main Fort Portal-Kasese Highway, which continues on to Mpondwe at the International border with the Democratic Republic of the Congo. The town sits on the eastern bank of Mubuku River, the location of three hydropower electricity-generating plants; namely: Mubuku I Power Station, Mubuku II Power Station and Mubuku III Power Station. Due to its location, the town serves as a base camp for mountaineers who attempt climbing the Rwenzori Mountains. In the past, it also served as a training camp for the Ugandan national boxing team during preparations for international competitions.

The town is the location of Mubuku Irrigation Scheme, a government-funded irrigation project, covering approximately 2,000 acres (810 ha). Established in the 1960s, the scheme fell into disrepair during the 1980s and 1990s. The Government of Uganda has earmarked nearly 20 billion Uganda Shillings (US$8.2 million), to rehabilitate the project. The crops grown in the irrigated area include: rice, maize, millet, beans, sweet potatoes and groundnuts.

== Population ==
The current population of Mubuku is not publicly known at this time.

== See also ==
- Baamba
- Bakonjo
- Basongora
- Hima Cement Limited
