= Kikorongo–Ishaka Road =

Uganda road in the Western Region

Coordinates: 00°16′37″S 30°06′27″E

Route information
- Length: 45 mi (72 km)

Major junctions
- North end: Kikorongo
- Katunguru; Rubirizi
- South end: Ishaka

Location
- Country: Uganda

Highway system
- Roads in Uganda

Kikorongo–Ishaka Road is located in the Western Region of Uganda and connects the towns of Kikorongo in Kasese District and Ishaka in Bushenyi District.

== Location ==
The north end of the road starts at Kikorongo, on the Fort Portal–Kasese–Mpondwe Road. It proceeds southward across the Kazinga Channel at Katunguru, continuing through Rubirizi, to end at Ishaka, a total distance of about 73 kilometres (45 mi).

== Overview ==
This road is an important transport corridor for people and goods from Rwanda, Burundi and the Western Region of Uganda, destined for South Sudan. The section between Ishaka and Katunguru, measuring about 55 kilometres (34 mi) was rehabilitated between August 1990 and July 1993 by China Sichuan International Cooperation Company Limited (SIETCO), at a cost of US$13.8 million, borrowed from the African Development Bank.

== See also ==
- List of roads in Uganda
