= Mweya =

- Location in Uganda
- Coordinates: 00°11′25″S 29°53′59″E
- Country: Uganda
- Region: Western Region, Uganda
- Sub-region: Rwenzururu sub-region
- District: Kasese District
- Elevation: 3,220 ft (980 m)

Mweya is a location in the Western Region of Uganda.

== Location ==
Mweya is located in Kasese District, Rwenzururu sub-region, Western Uganda. It lies within Queen Elizabeth National Park, the most visited of Uganda's national parks. Mweya is approximately 55 kilometres (34 mi), by road, southwest of Kasese, the district headquarters and the largest town in the sub-region, and roughly 400 kilometres (249 mi), by road, southwest of Kampala, the capital and largest city of Uganda. Mweya sits on the northeastern shores of Lake Edward where the Kazinga Channel joins the lake. The coordinates of Mweya are:00°11'40.0"S 29°53'57.0"E (Latitude:-0.194444; Longitude:29.899167).

== Overview ==
Mweya is the most visited location in Queen Elizabeth National Park, due to the amenities and facilities clustered close to its location, including Mweya Airport, accommodation facilities, access to Lake Edward and Kazinga Channel, and abundant game, on land, in the water, and in the air. The topography, fauna, and flora around Mweya in the northern sector of the national park, differs significantly from that in the southern sector (also known as the Ishasha sector).

== Points of interest ==
The following points of interest lie in Mweya or near its edges: 1. The headquarters of Queen Elizabeth National Park 2. Mweya Airport - A civilian airport located at Mweya 3. Kazinga Channel - A freshwaterway connecting Lake Edward and Lake George, that is about 35 kilometres (22 mi) in length. 4. Lake Edward - A freshwater lake in the Western Rift Valley. 5. The International border between Uganda and the Democratic Republic of the Congo runs through the middle of Lake Edward.
