= Bugoye =

- Map of Uganda showing the location of Bugoye.
- Coordinates: 0°18′18″N 30°06′00″E
- Country: Uganda
- Region: Western Uganda
- Sub-region: Rwenzururu
- District: Kasese District
- Elevation: 1,232 m (4,042 ft)
- Time zone: UTC+3 (EAT)
- Climate: Aw

Bugoye is a small town in Western Uganda.

== Location ==
The town is located in Kasese District, Rwenzururu sub-region, in Western Uganda, within the Rwenzori Mountains, close to the Intentional border with the Democratic Republic of the Congo (DRC). Bugoye is located approximately 20 kilometres (12 mi), north of Kasese, the location of the district headquarters. This location lies about 350 kilometres (220 mi), west of Kampala, Uganda's capital and largest city. The coordinates of Bugoye are:0°18'18.0"N, 30°06'00.0"E (Latitude:0.3050; Longitude:30.1000).

== Overview ==
Bugoye is an urban center in Kasese District. The town is administered by Bugoye Town Council, an urban local government within Kasese District Administration. Other urban centers in the district include: Hima, Bwera, Mpondwe and Kalongo.

== Population ==
The population of the town is unknown as of May 2014.

== Points of interest ==
The following points of interest are located inside the town or near its edges:

- The offices of Bugoye Town council
- The offices of Bugoye sub-county
- Bugoye Central Market
- River Mubuku - The river courses through town in a general north to south direction.
- Bugoye Power Station - The 13 Megawatt mini-hydropower installation sits in the southern part of the town, close to the main street.
- Rwenzori Mountains - The town sits in the middle of the mountain range at an altitude of approximately 1,232 metres (4,042 ft).
- Bugoye Health Centre III - The health facility is owned by the Uganda Ministry of Health. It is operated in collaboration with Mbarara University School of Medicine and MGH Center for Global Health.
