= Katunguru, Uganda =

Settlement in Uganda

Katunguru
- Location in Uganda
- Coordinates: 00°08′49″S 30°03′46″E
- Country: Uganda
- Region: Western Region of Uganda
- Sub-Region: Ankole sub-region
- District: Rubirizi District
- Sub-county: Katunguru Sub-county
- Elevation: 3,120 ft (950 m)

Population (2020 Estimate)
  - Total: 4,200

Katunguru, is a settlement in Rubirizi District, Ankole sub-region, in the Western Region of Uganda. The name also applies to Katunguru Sub-county and Katunguru Parish, where the settlement is located.

== Location ==
Katunguru is just south of the equator, on the Kikorongo–Ishaka Road. The town is approximately 18 kilometres (11 mi), by road, north of Rubirizi, the location of the district headquarters.

This is on the southern banks of the Kazinga Channel, which links Lake George with Lake Edward, and forms the border between Kasese District to the north and Rubirizi District to the south. Katunguru is located approximately 41 kilometres (25 mi) south of Kasese, the nearest large town.

Katunguru, which lies within the boundaries of Queen Elizabeth National Park, is located about 383 kilometres (238 mi), by road, west of Kampala, the largest city in Uganda and the capital of that country. The coordinates of Katunguru, Uganda are:0°08'49.0"S, 30°03'46.0"E (Latitude:-0.146956; Longitude:30.062770). Katunguru lies at an average elevation of 950 metres (3,117 ft) above mean sea level.

== Population ==
In 2015, the Uganda Bureau of Statistics (UBOS) estimated Katunguru Sub-county's population at 3,900 people. By mid-2020, UBOS estimated that the population had increased to 4,200. It further estimated that in July 2020, 2,400 people (57.1 percent) were male and 1,800 (42.9 percent) were female. UBOS further calculated that the population grew at an average annual rate of 1.5 percent between 2015 and 2020.

== Points of interest ==
The town serves as a gateway to Queen Elizabeth National Park, with several of the primary entrances to the park within a few kilometers. The following points of interest are also found within the town limits or close to its edges: (a) the offices of Katunguru Town Council (b) the headquarters of Katunguru Sub-county (c) Katunguru central market, the source of daily fresh produce and (d) Katunguru Senior Secondary School.

== Economy ==
Katunguru's primary occupation is fishing, with a daily fish market and a substantial number of small boats fishing the Kazinga Channel and nearby Lake George. Agriculture and gardening is generally not possible due to the large animals that often wander through town, including buffalo, hippopotamus and elephants. The settlement also serves the various nearby safari lodges due to its central location within the national park.
