= Bugoye Hydroelectric Power Station =

Bugoye Power Station
- Map of Uganda showing the location of Bugoye Station.
- Country: Uganda
- Location: Bugoye, Kasese District
- Coordinates: 00°18′20″N 30°05′53″E
- Purpose: Power
- Status: Operational

Dam and spillways
- Impounds: Mubuku River

Bugoye Power Station
- Operator: Berkeley Energy
- Commission date: 7 October 2009
- Type: Run-of-the-river
- Hydraulic head: 159 m (522 ft)
- Turbines: 2 Francis turbines
- Installed capacity: 13 MW
- Annual generation: 82 Gwh

Bugoye Power Station is a 13 MW (17,000 hp) mini hydroelectric power station in Uganda. In the literature, Bugoye Power Station is sometimes referred to as Mubuku II Power Station.

== Location ==
The power station is located across the Mubuku River, in Bugoye, Kasese District, in Western Uganda. This location lies in the foothills of the Rwenzori Mountains, close to the border with the Democratic Republic of the Congo. Bugoye lies approximately 19 kilometres (12 mi), by road, north of Kasese, the location of the district headquarters, and the nearest large city.

== Overview ==
The Bugoye Hydropower Project, is a run of the river mini-hydropower installation, with installed capacity of 13 MW. The energy generated is fed into the national electric grid at Nkenda Substation, located 6 kilometres (3.7 mi) from Bugoye, via a 33kV transmission line.

The power station is owned and operated by TronderEnergi, a Norwegian power company. Construction began in March 2008 and the plant was commissioned 19 months later in October 2009. Bugoye Power Station is the third mini-hydropower station on River Mubuku. The other two are Mubuku I Power Station, owned by Kilembe Mines Limited (KML), with installed capacity of 5 MW and Mubuku III Power Station, owned by Kasese Cobalt Company Limited (KCCL), with installed capacity of 10 MW.

== Construction costs ==
The estimated costs for the dam and power plant is approximately US$35 million. The funding was facilitated by a loan from the Emerging Africa Infrastructure Fund, (EAIF). This does not include the construction of a 33kV transmission power line linking the power station to the substation where the power is integrated into the national grid. The power line was funded by a grant from the Government of Norway to the Government of Uganda. By mutual consent between the two governments, Tronder Power Limited, assumed the responsibility of developing, constructing, maintaining and servicing the power line. Tronder Power Limited is a Ugandan company co-owned by TronderEnergi and Norfund.

== See also ==
- Uganda power stations
- Africa hydropower stations
- Hima
- Hydroelectric stations
- Western Uganda
