= Kikorongo =

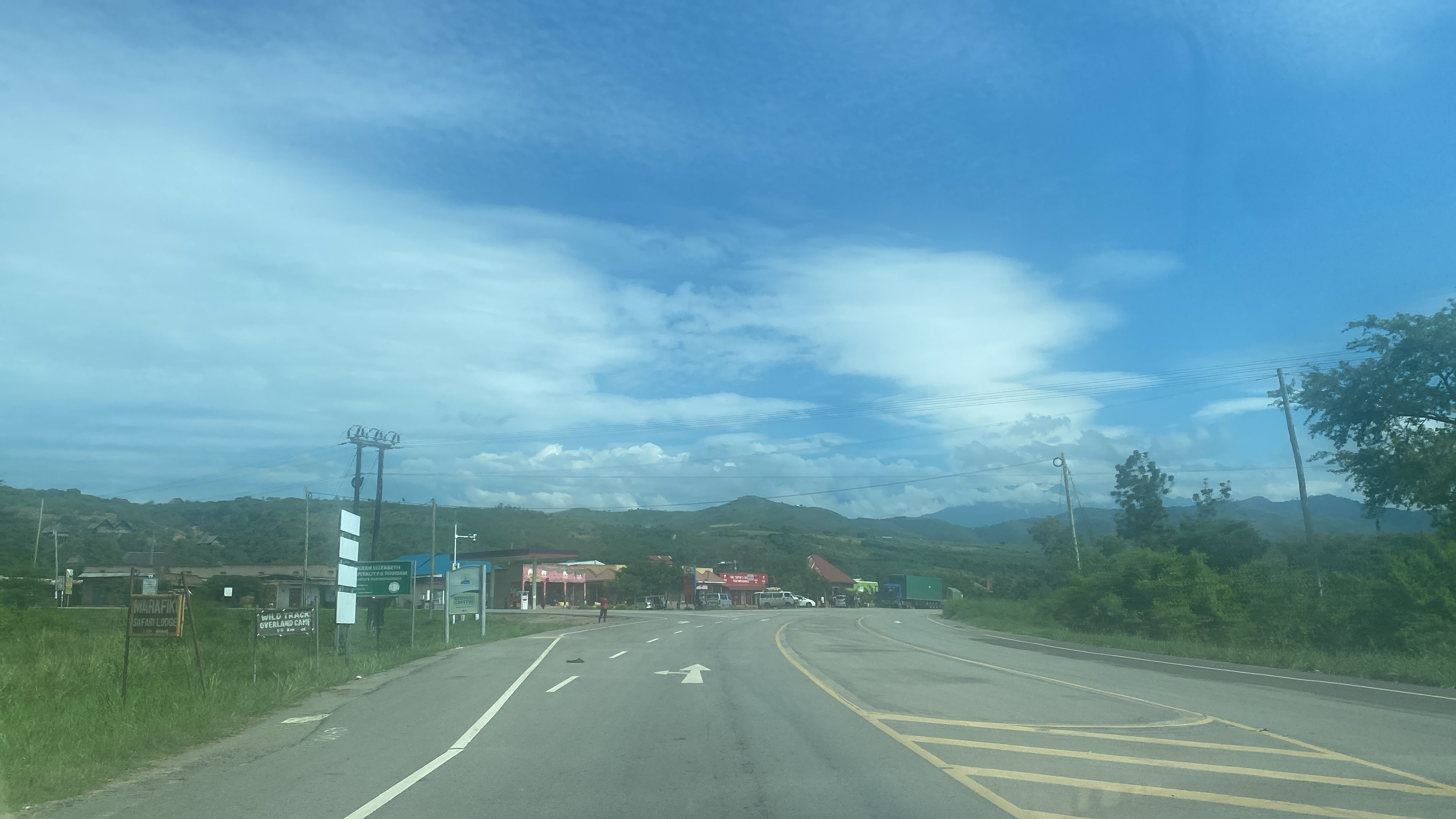

- Location in Uganda
- Coordinates: 00°00′00″S 29°59′55″E
- Country: Uganda
- Region: Western Region
- Sub-Region: Rwenzururu
- District: Kasese District

Kikorongo, also Kikorongo Junction, is a settlement in Kasese District, in the Western Region of Uganda.

== Location ==
The town is located on the Fort Portal–Kasese–Mpondwe Road, about 25 kilometres (16 mi) south of Kasese. This is about 38 kilometres (24 mi) east of Mpondwe, the town at the international border with DR Congo. The coordinates of Kikorongo are: 0°00'00.0"N, 29°59'55.0"E (Latitude:0.000005; Longitude:29.998618). As one can deduce from the latitude, the settlement sits directly at the Equator.

== Points of interest ==
The Fort Portal–Kasese–Mpondwe Road joins the Kikorongo–Ishaka Road at Kikorongo.

== See also ==
- Katunguru
- Fort Portal–Kasese–Mpondwe Road
