= Mubuku III Hydroelectric Power Station =

Mubuku III Power Station
- Map of Uganda showing the location of Mubuku III Power Station
- Country: Uganda
- Location: Mubuku, Kasese District
- Coordinates: 00°15′37″N 30°08′58″E
- Status: Operational
- Owner: Kasese Cobalt Company Limited

Dam and spillways
- Impounds: Mubuku River

Reservoir
- Normal elevation: 1,180 m (3,870 ft)

Power Station
- Commission date: 2008
- Type: Run-of-the-river
- Turbines: 4
- Installed capacity: 10 MW (13,000 hp)

Mubuku III Power Station is a 10 megawatts (13,000 hp) mini-hydroelectric power station in Uganda.

== Location ==
The power station is located across the Mubuku River, near the town of Mubuku, Kasese District, in Western Uganda. This location lies in the foothills of the Rwenzori Mountains, close to the border with the Democratic Republic of the Congo. Mubuku lies approximately 17 kilometres (11 mi), by road, north of Kasese, the location of the district headquarters, and the nearest large city.

== Overview ==
The Mubuku III Power Station, is a run of the river mini-hydropower installation, with installed capacity of 10 MW. It became operational in 2008, having been built by Kasese Cobalt Company Limited, a company that extracts cobalt from the sludge left when copper is extracted out of copper ore. The excess power generated is sold to the national grid. Mubuku III Power Station is the third mini-hydropower station on River Mubuku. The other two are Mubuku I Power Station, owned and operated by Kilembe Mines Limited, with installed capacity of 5 MW and Mubuku II Power Station, also known as Bugoye Power Station, with capacity of 13 MW, owned by Tronder Power Limited, a Norwegian company.

== See also ==
- Uganda power stations
- Africa power stations
- Hydropower stations
