= Kilembe, Uganda =

Kilembe
- Location in Uganda
- Coordinates: 00°11′53″N 30°00′49″E
- Country: Uganda
- Region: Western Region
- District: Kasese District

Kilembe is a community in Kasese District, in the Western Region of Uganda.

== Location ==
Kilembe is located in Kasese District, in the Western Region of Uganda, about 11 kilometres (7 mi), northwest of Kasese, the nearest large town. This is about 85 kilometres (53 mi), southwest of Fort Portal, the nearest large city. Kilembe lies about 354 kilometres (220 mi), southwest of the city of Kampala, Uganda's capital. The coordinates of Kilembe, Uganda are: 0°11'53.0"N, 30°00'49.0"E (Latitude:0.198059; Longitude:30.013620).

== Overview ==
Kilembe measures approximately 8.5 square kilometres (3 sq mi) and lies on the banks of the River Nyamwamba, at the foothills of the Rwenzori Mountains. Kilembe is home to Kilembe Mines, the mining company extracting copper and cobalt from the rocks beneath and adjacent to the town. The town also has a post office and Kilembe Mines Hospital.

== Prominent people ==
- Leo Rwabwogo (1949 – 2009) – The late boxing champion was a native son
- Danny Faure (1962) – former President of Seychelles (2016-2020)
- Sudhir Ruparelia

== See also ==
- List of cities and towns in Uganda
