= Kambale Ferigo =

Ugandan politician

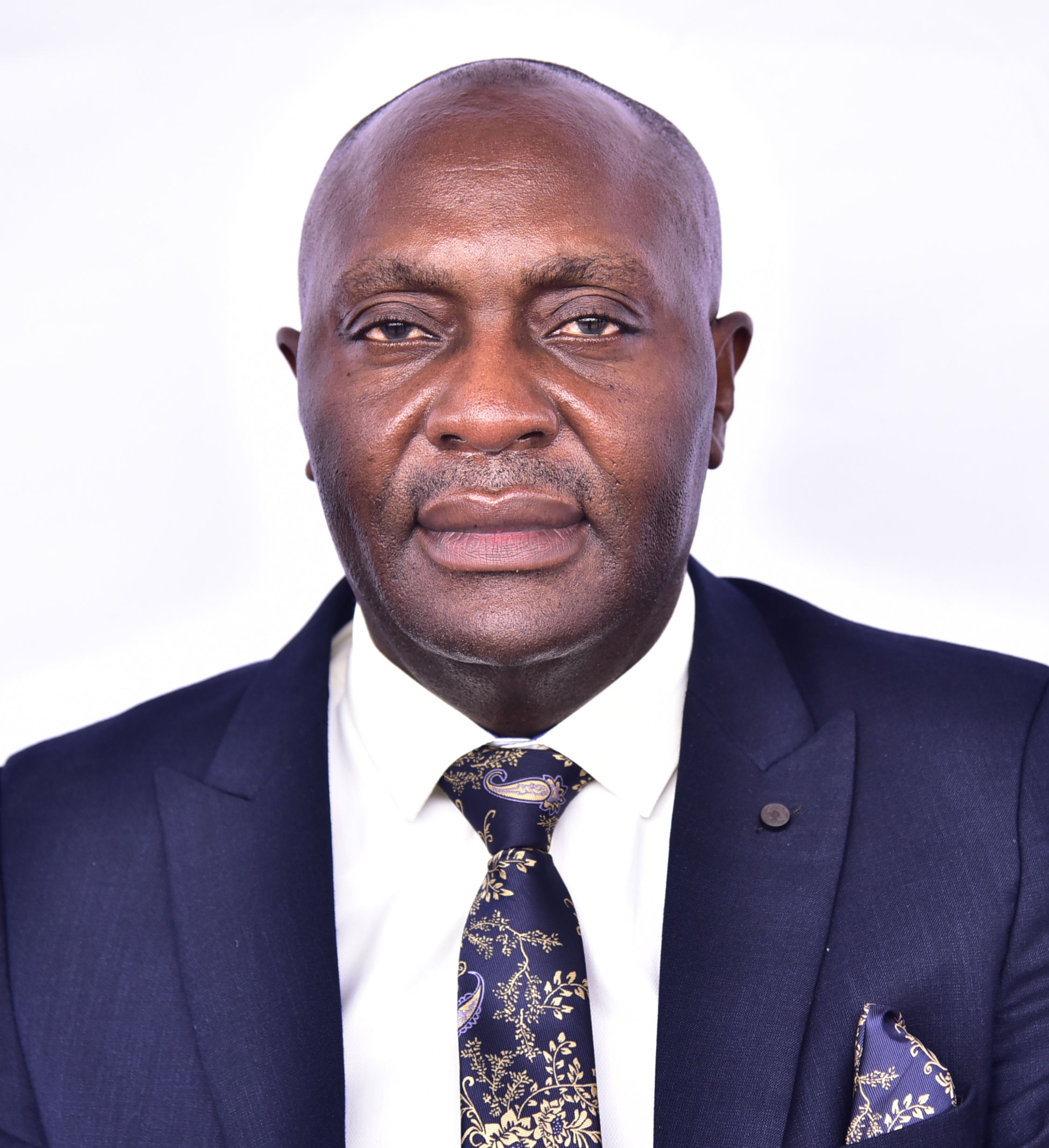
- Constituency: Kasese Municipality

Personal details
- Born: Kasese, Uganda
- Political party: National Resistance Movement
- Occupation: Politician
- Known for: Member of Parliament

Kambale Ferigo is a Ugandan politician and legislator, representing Kasese municipality in the 11th Parliament of Uganda.

He was elected to Parliament after contesting and winning Robert Centenary and others, during 2021 general elections.

During the 2021 election campaigns, he promised to persuade the government to reconstruct Kilembe Mines hospital, build a modern mortuary, construct Kasese airport and organize trade symposiums to boost business.

He is also the Director of a community-based organization called Big Heart Foundation (BHF) which organizes trainings in vocational skills for the youths in Kasese district, and has guided them in forming groups to fight unemploymentyment.

During his time as Kasese Chief Financial Officer (CFO) in 2015, a group of youth stormed his home demanding him to contest in 2016 elections, which he did and lost.

He was among the team of Members of Parliament from Kasese, who were demanding the speedy trial and release of Omusinga Charles Wesley Mumbere of Rwenzururu, his former prime minister and royal guards.
