= Kilembe Mines Hospital =

- Kilembe Mines; Uganda Ministry of Health; Roman Catholic Diocese of Kasese
- Location within Uganda

Geography
- Location: Kilembe, Kasese District, Western Region, Uganda
- Coordinates: 00°12′14″N 30°00′37″E

Organisation
- Care system: Community Hospital
- Type: General

Services
- Emergency department: I
- Beds: 200

History
- Founded: 1951

Links
- Other links: Hospitals in Uganda

Kilembe Mines Hospital, is a community hospital in the Western Region of Uganda.

== Location ==
The hospital is located in the community of Kilembe, on the campus of Kilembe Mines, in Kasese District, about 86 kilometres (53 mi) southwest of Fort Portal Regional Referral Hospital. This is approximately 166 kilometres (103 mi) northwest of Mbarara Regional Referral Hospital. The coordinates of Kilembe Mines Hospital are:0°12'14.0"N, 30°00'37.0"E (Latitude:0.203885; Longitude:30.010271).

== Overview ==
The hospital, being located on the banks of River Nyamwamba, is prone to flooding; having flooded in May 2013, in May 2014 and in July 2015.

== Hospital profile ==
The hospital was established in 1951 to serve the staff of Kilembe Mines. It also caters for the hospital needs of the Kilembe community. The three major benefactors of Kilembe Mines Hospital are (a) the Government of Uganda (b) Kilembe Mines Limited and (c) the Roman Catholic Diocese of Kasese. It as capacity of 200 beds.

== See also ==
- Kasese
- List of hospitals in Uganda
