= Fort Portal–Kasese–Mpondwe Road =

Ugandan road in the Western Region

Coordinates: 00°00′00″N 29°59′55″E

Route information
- Length: 83 mi (134 km)

Major junctions
- East end: Fort Portal
- Rwimi; Hima; Kasese; Kikorongo
- West end: Mpondwe

Location
- Country: Uganda

Highway system
- Roads in Uganda

The Fort Portal–Kasese–Mpondwe Road, also Fort Portal–Mpondwe Road, is a road in the Western Region of Uganda, connecting the towns of Fort Portal, Hima, Kasese, Kikorongo and the border town of Mpondwe.

== Location ==
The road starts at Fort Portal, the headquarters of Kabarole District. It travels southwest through Rwimi, Hima, Kasese and Kikorongo. At Kiorongo, the road makes a 90 degree turn west to end at Mpondwe, at the international border with the Democratic Republic of the Congo, a total distance of about 135 kilometres (84 mi).

== Upgrade to bituminous surface ==
This road was improved to class II bituminous surface before 2013.

== Points of interest ==
The following lie along or near this road

- Virika Hospital, located in Fort Portal's central business district
- The town of Rwimi, about 45 kilometres (28 mi), south of Fort Portal
- Hima, lies about 56 kilometres (35 mi) south of Fort Portal
- Kasese Airport, in the middle the town of Kasese, about 77 kilometres (48 mi) south of Fort Portal
- Kasese Cobalt Company Limited lies in Kasese, south of the central business district.
- At Kikorongo, the road takes a 90 degrees turn to the right and heads west towards the border with the Democratic Republic of the Congo. Kikorongo is a town in Kasese District, about 22 kilometres (14 mi), south of Kasese.
- At Katojo Village a road branches off this road and proceeds south to Katwe Village and Mweya Safari Lodge, inside Queen Elizabeth National Park.

== See also ==
- Uganda National Roads Authority
- List of roads in Uganda
