= Rubirizi District =

- District
- District location in Uganda
- Coordinates: 00°16′S 30°06′E
- Country: Uganda
- Region: Western Uganda
- Sub-region: Ankole sub-region
- Established: 1 July 2010; 16 years ago
- Capital: Rubirizi

Area
  - Land: 985 km^{2} (380 sq mi)
- Elevation: 1,764 m (5,787 ft)

Population (2014 Census)
  - Total: 129,149
  - Density: 143.6/km^{2} (372/sq mi)
- Time zone: UTC+3 (EAT)
- Area code: 112
- Website: www.rubirizi.go.ug

Rubirizi District is a district in Western Uganda. Like most Ugandan districts, the district is named after its 'chief town', Rubirizi, where the district headquarters are located.

== Location ==
Rubirizi District is bordered by Kasese District to the north, Kitagwenda District to the northeast, Ibanda District to the east, Buhweju District to the southeast, Bushenyi District to the south, Rukungiri District to the southwest and the Democratic Republic of the Congo to the west. The district headquarters at Rubirizi are located approximately 97 kilometres (60 mi) northwest of Mbarara, the largest city in Ankole sub-region. This is approximately 364 kilometres (226 mi), southwest of Kampala, Uganda's capital and largest city. The coordinates of the district are: 00 16S, 30 06E.

== Overview ==
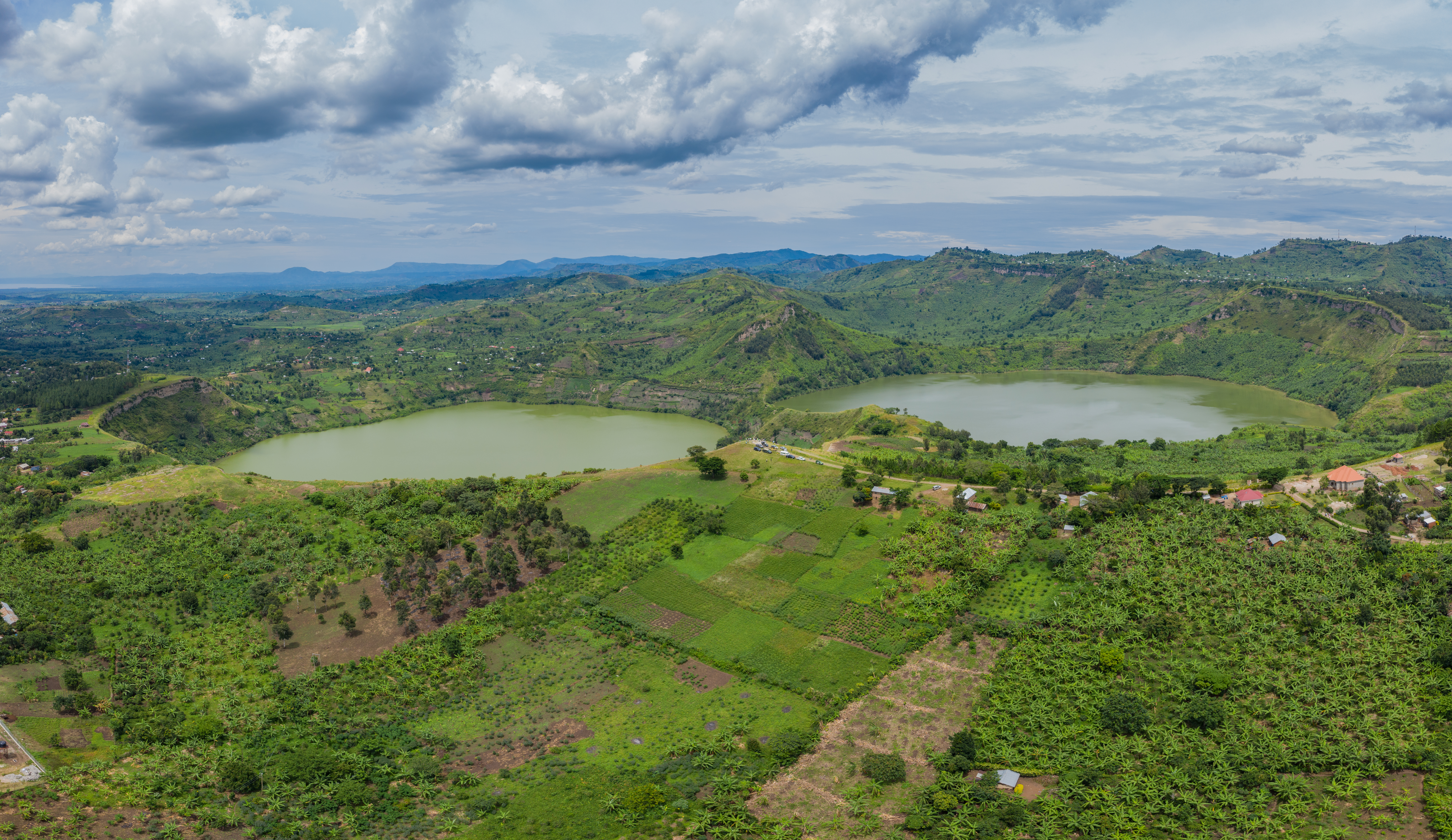
Twin crater lakes, Kyema and Kamweru, in Rubirizi District

Rubirizi District was carved out of Bushenyi District in July 2010. Prior to then, the district was known as Bunyaruguru County.

It is one of the districts that constitute Ankole sub-region, home to an estimated 3.9 million Banyankole, in 2018, according to CIA Factbook. The full list of districts in the sub-region include: 1. Buhweju District 2. Bushenyi District 3. Ibanda District 4. Isingiro District 5. Kiruhura District 6. Mitooma District 7. Ntungamo District 8. Rubirizi District 9. Sheema District

About 50% of Queen Elizabeth National Park lies in Rubirizi District. The key tourist areas of the park in the district include:

- The Kyambura Gorge
- Parts of Lake Edward and Lake George
- The Kazinga Channel connects Lake Edward and Lake George and is popular for the boat ride.
- Over 50 crater lakes.
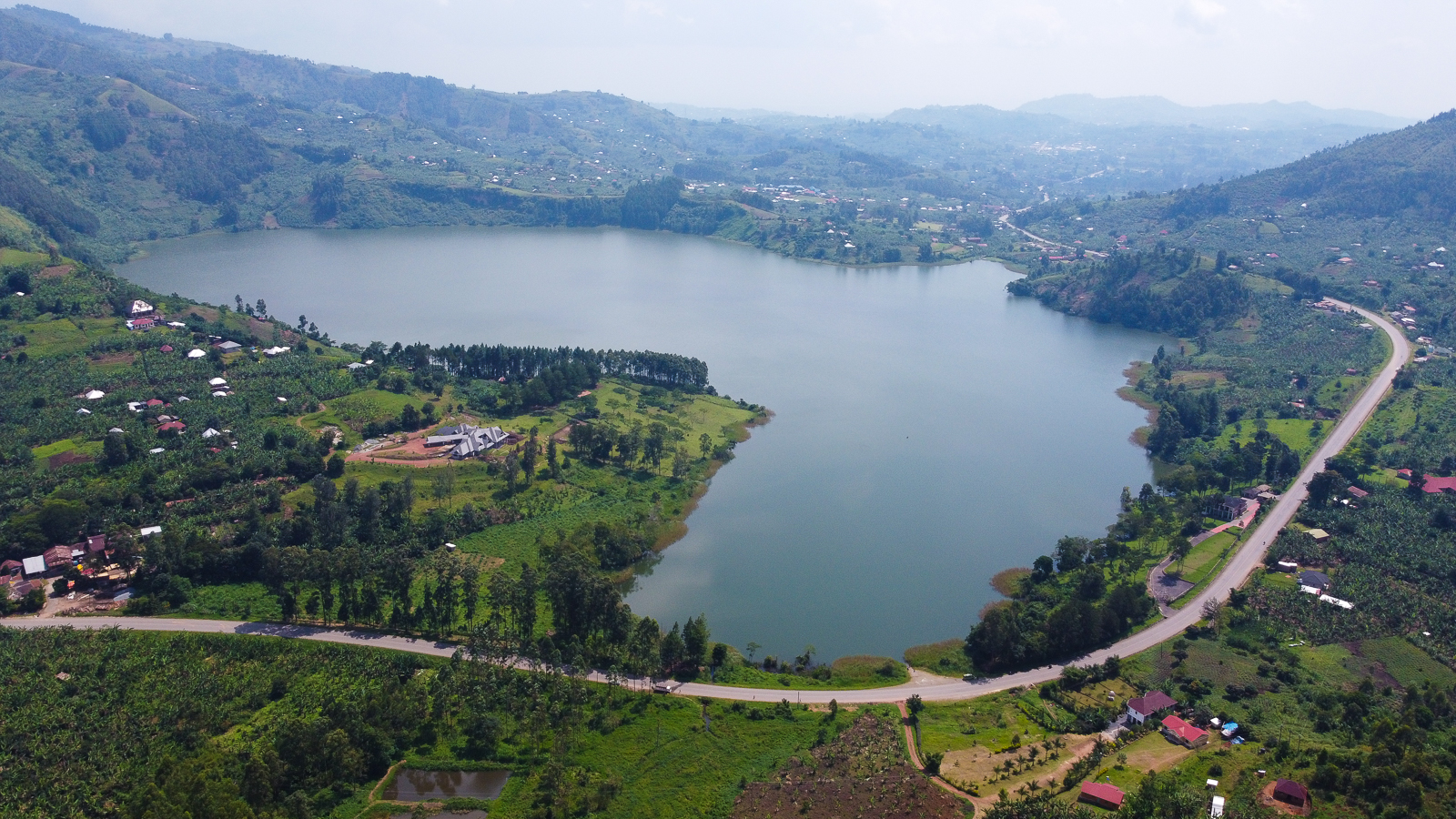
  Lake Nkugute also known as Lake Rutoto, is located in Rubirizi district in western Uganda and is shaped in a manner that resembles the map of Africa

== Population ==
In 1991, the national population census estimated the district population at about 75,400. The national census in 2002 estimated the population in the district at about 101,800. The Rubirizi District population was enumerated at 129,149 in 2014. In 2020, the mid-year population of the district was projected at 144,100 people. The annual rate of population growth in the district was calculated to average 1.9 percent, between 2014 and 2020.

Historical population
Year	Pop.	±%
1991	75,400	—
2002	101,800	+35.0%
2014	129,149	+26.9%
2020	144,100	+11.6%

== See also ==
- Rubirizi
- Ankole
- Western Uganda
- Uganda Districts
