= Virika Hospital =

- Uganda Catholic Medical Bureau

Geography
- Location: Fort Portal, Kabarole District, Western Region, Uganda
- Coordinates: 00°38′16″N 30°16′06″E

Organisation
- Care system: Private
- Type: Community
- Affiliated university: Uganda Martyrs University

Services
- Emergency department: I
- Beds: 207 (2019)

History
- Founded: 1911; 115 years ago

Links
- Website: Homepage
- Other links: Hospitals in Uganda; Medical education in Uganda

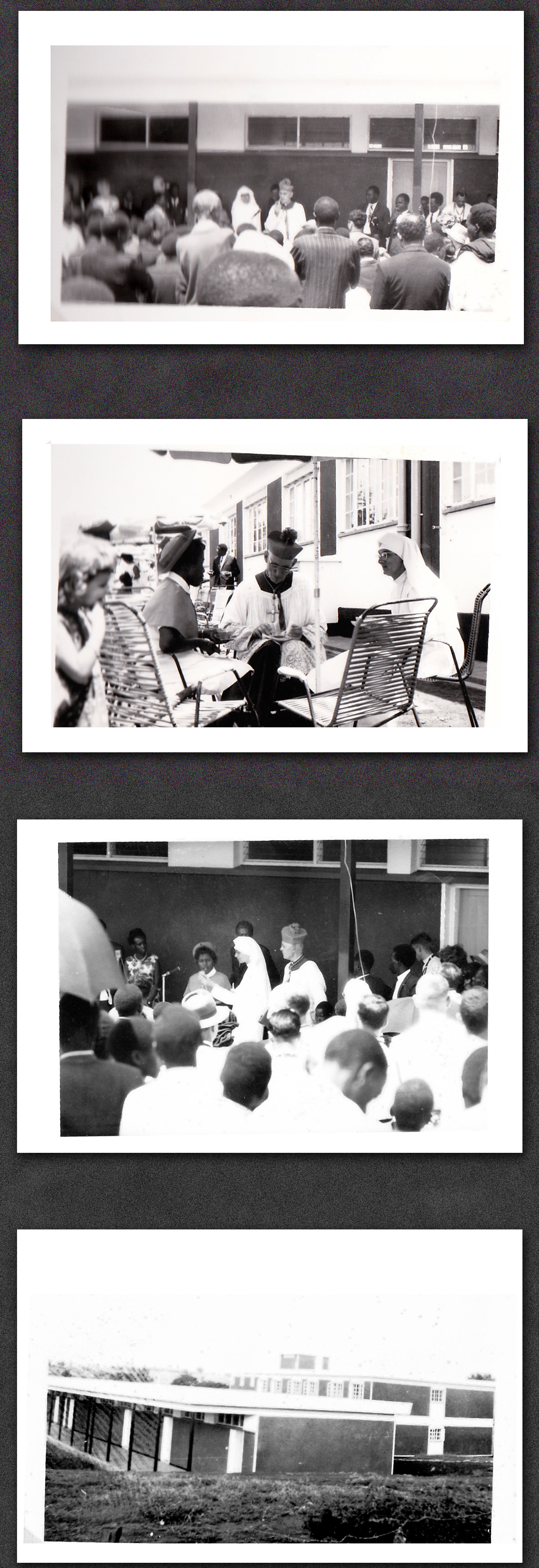
Virika School of Nursing and Midwifery (VSN).

Holy Family Virika Hospital, commonly referred to as Virika Hospital, is a private, community hospital, in Fort Portal, Kabarole District, Western Uganda.

== Location ==
The hospital is located in the central business district of the city of Fort Portal, along the Fort Portal–Kasese–Mpondwe Road, in Western Uganda, in the foothills of the Rwenzori Mountains. It lies about 3 kilometres (2 mi), southwest of Fort Portal Regional Referral Hospital. This is about 180 kilometres (110 mi), northwest of Mbarara Regional Referral Hospital. The geographical coordinates of Virika Hospital are: 0°38'16.0"N, 30°16'06.0"E (Latitude:0.637767; Longitude:30.268329).

== Overview ==
Holy Family Virika Hospital is a private, non-profit, faith-based, community hospital owned by the Roman Catholic Diocese of Fort Portal. It is accredited to the Uganda Catholic Medical Bureau, and it is administered by the Sisters of the Daughters of Saint Thereza of the Child Jesus, a religious congregation. The hospital serves patients from within Kabarole District and from the neighbouring districts of Kasese, Bundibugyo, Kamwenge, Kyenjojo and Kibaale. The hospital runs the Bishop Magambo Counselor Training Institute, which offers a Master of Arts in Counseling degree, in collaboration with Uganda Martyrs University. The hospital also runs the Virika Hospital School of Nursing.

== History ==
Founded as a dispensary in 1911, by the White Sisters of our Lady of Africa, Virika Hospital gradually developed from those humble beginnings. In 1962 the hospital was handed over to the Medical Mission Sisters who expanded the facilities and established the Virika School of Nursing. The hospital was handed over to the Roman Catholic Diocese of Fort Portal in 1975. The diocese entrusted the management of the institution to the religious congregation of the Sisters of the Daughters of Saint Thereza of the Child Jesus. In February 1994, Virika hospital suffered major earthquake damage affecting 95 percent of the buildings. Repairs to the damage lasted from 1995 until 2000.

== Hospital operations ==
As of December 2019, the hospital's bed capacity was 207. At that time, Holy Family Virika Hospital attended to 21,053 outpatients annually, on average. There were 8,369 inpatient admissions annually, on average, with a bed occupancy ratio of 37 percent. The hospital had 1,840 annual maternal deliveries, on average, with a caesarian section rate of 34.6 percent. In 2019, patient user-fees accounted for approximately 59.1 percent of total hospital annual income, on average.

== See also ==
- List of hospitals in Uganda
