= Rubirizi =

Ugandan town

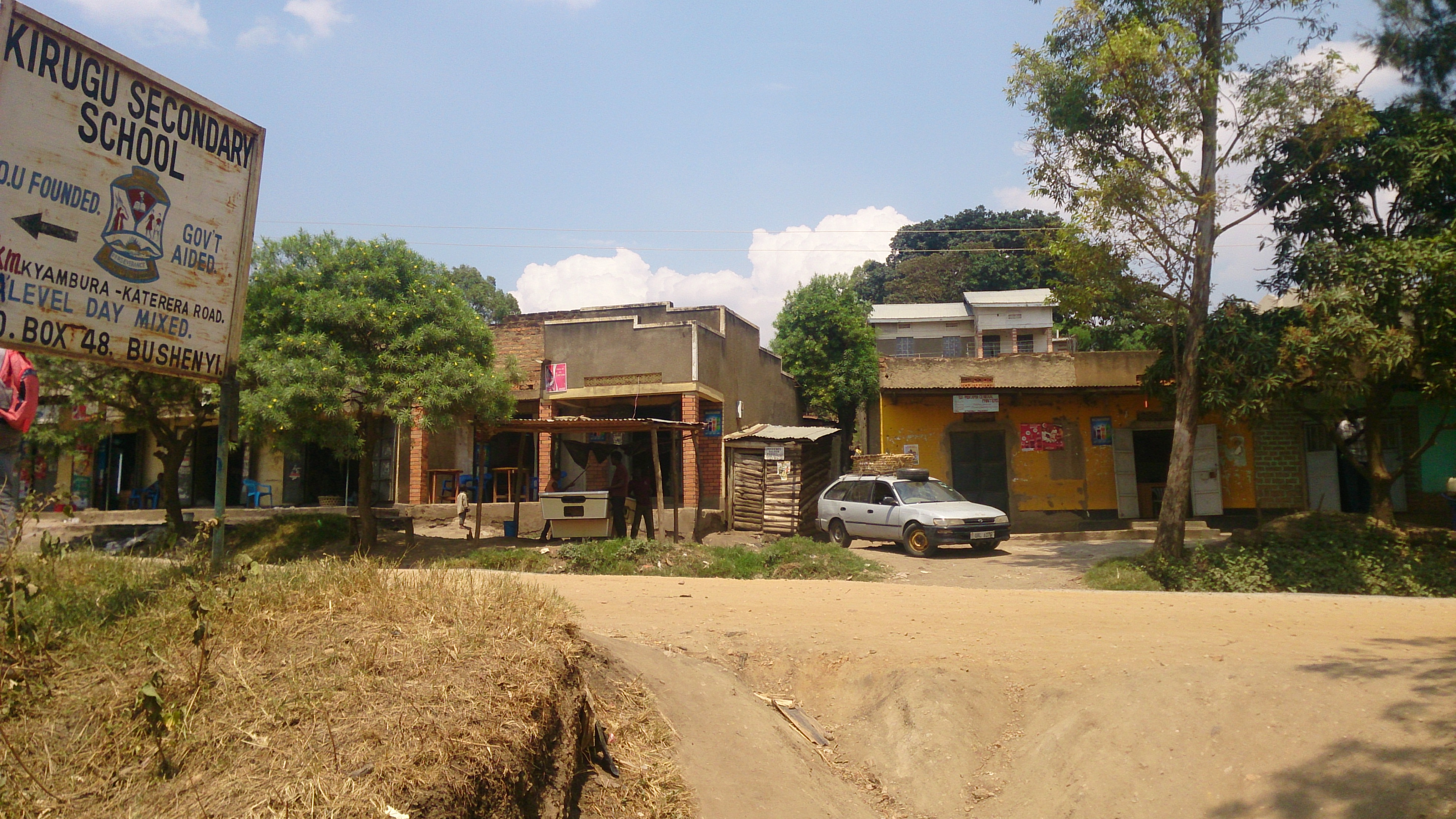

- Location in Uganda
- Coordinates: 00°15′58″S 30°06′25″E
- Country: Uganda
- Region: Western Region
- Sub-Region: Ankole sub-region
- District: Rubirizi District
- Elevation: 5,787 ft (1,764 m)

Population (2014 Census)
  - Total: 8,204

Rubirizi, sometimes spelled Rubiriizi, is a town in Rubirizi District, Ankole sub-region, Western Uganda. The town is the main municipal, administrative and commercial center of Rubirizi District. The district is named after the town.

== Location ==
Rubirizi lies just south of the Equator, along the Kikorongo–Ishaka Road. This location is approximately 97 kilometres (60 mi), by road, northwest of Mbarara, the largest city in Ankole sub-region. Rubirizi is located approximately 364 kilometres (226 mi), by road, southwest of Kampala, Uganda's capital largest city. The coordinates of the town are: 00°15'58.0"S, 30°06'25.0"E (Latitude:-0.266111; Longitude:30.106944). Rubirizi is located at an average elevation of 1,764 metres (5,787 ft), above sea level.

== Population ==
The 2014 population census enumerated Rubirizi Town's population at 8,204. In 2015, the town's population was projected at 8,300. By mid-2020, the town's population was projected at 9,100. It was calculated that the town's population grew at an average annual rate of 1.9 percent between 2015 and 2020.

Historical population
Year	Pop.	±%
2014	8,204	—
2015	8,300	+1.2%
2020	9,100	+9.6%

== Points of interest ==
The following points of interest are found within or close to the town limits: (a) The headquarters of Rubirizi District Administration (b) The offices of Rubirizi Town Council (c) Rubirizi Central Market: The largest fresh-produce market in the town (d) The Ntungamo-Kasese Highway: The highway passes through the town in a general north to south direction and (e) A branch of Bank of Africa Uganda.

== See also ==
- Katunguru
- Rubirizi District
- Ankole
- Western Uganda
