= TrønderEnergi =

Norwegian power company

TrønderEnergi AS
- Type: Municipal owned
- Industry: Power
- Founded: 1950
- Headquarters: Trondheim, Norway,
- Area served: South Trøndelag, Norway
- Key people: Ståle Gjersvold (CEO); Per Kristian Skjærvik Chairman
- Revenue: ▲NOK 844 million (2006)
- Operating income: NOK 320 million (2006)
- Net income: NOK 183 million (2006)
- Number of employees: 500 (2011)
- Website: tronderenergi.no

TrønderEnergi is a power company based in Trondheim Municipality, Norway that operates hydroelectric power plants and wind farms, as well as the power grid in the southern parts of Trøndelag county. The grid encompasses eleven municipalities, and current grid to 120,000 customers. Total electricity production is 3.0 terawatt-hours (11 PJ).

It also owns the Ugandan Tronder Power Ltd., which in 2008 built and since then operated Bugoye Power Station in southwestern Uganda. This with financial aid from the Norwegian stateowned equity company and Bugoye co-owner Norfund.

The company is entirely owned Kommunal Landspensjonskasse (13.3%) and the following 19 municipalities in Trøndelag: Frøya (2.49%), Heim (4.85%), Hitra (2.69%), Holtålen (1.34%), Indre Fosen (8%), Malvik (2.96%), Melhus (13.34%), Midtre Gauldal (3.17%), Oppdal (3.95%), Orkland (16.94%), Osen (1.04%), Rennebu (0.07%), Selbu (1.43%), Skaun (2.2%), Stjørdal (0.18%), Trondheim (9.13%), Tydal (0.16%), Ørland (7.69%), and Åfjord Municipality (5.04%).

== History ==
The company was founded in 1950 as an inter-municipal agency named Sør-Trøndelag Elektrisitetsverk, later changing its name to Sør-Trøndelag Kraftselskap and finally to the limited company TrønderEnergi AS. In 2001 it merged with Melhus Energi. The same year TrønderEnergi bought 49% of the power company Nordmøre Energiverk. In 2010, it merged with Trondheim Energi Nett AS.

== Power plants ==
- Bessakerfjellet windfarm
- Eidsfoss power plant
- Frøya windfarm
- Håen power plant
- Lofoss power plant
- Mørre power plant
- Nunelva power plant
- Sama power plant
- Simsfossen power plant
- Skjærlivatn power plant
- Sokna power plant
- Svartelva power plant
- Søa power plant
- Valsneset windfarm
- Vik power plant
