= Mubuku I Hydroelectric Power Station =

Mubuku I Power Station
- Map of Uganda showing the location of Mubuku I Power Station
- Country: Uganda
- Location: Kitoko, Kasese District
- Coordinates: 00°19′07″N 30°06′00″E
- Status: Operational
- Owner: Kilembe Mines Limited

Dam and spillways
- Impounds: Mubuku River

Reservoir
- Normal elevation: 1,180 m (3,870 ft)

Power Station
- Commission date: 1950s
- Type: Run-of-the-river
- Turbines: 2
- Installed capacity: 5 MW (6,700 hp)

Mubuku I Power Station is a 5 megawatts (6,700 hp) mini-hydroelectric power station in Uganda.

== Location ==
The power station is located between Bugoye and Kitoko, straddling the Mubuku River in Kasese District in Western Uganda. The station is in the foothills of the Rwenzori Mountains, close to the border with the Democratic Republic of the Congo. Kitoko lies approximately 20 kilometres (12 mi), by road, north of Kasese, the location of the district headquarters and the nearest large city.

== History ==
Kilembe Mines Limited built the state in the 1950s to power the extraction of copper ore from the Rwenzori Mountains. The copper extraction ceased in the 1970s, and the power generated is now sold to the national grid. The Mubuku I Power Station is the third mini-hydropower station on the Mubuku River. The other two are the Mubuku II Power Station, commonly known as the Bugoye Power Station and owned by Tronder Power Limited, a Norwegian company, and the Mubuku III Power Station, owned by Kasese Cobalt Company Limited with an installed capacity of 10 megawatts (13,000 hp).

== Overview ==
The station is a run-of-the-river mini-hydropower installation, with installed capacity of 5 megawatts. In September 2013, Ugandan print media indicated that the Tibet-Hima Consortium, the Chinese company that won the concession to run Kilembe Mines for the next twenty five years, has plans to increase capacity of the power plant to 12 megawatts. The concession agreement was later terminated in September 2017 following reports of failure by Tibet-Hima to meet obligations stipulated in the agreement.

== See also ==
- List of power stations in Uganda
- List of hydropower stations in Africa
