= Kyondo Kasese =

Subcounty in Kasese District, Western Uganda

Kyondo
- Subcounty
- Kyondo Subcounty
- Country: Uganda
- Region: Western Region
- District: Kasese District
- County: Bukonzo County
- Established: 1980

Population (2024)
  - Total: 27,732
  - Households (2024): 5,507
- Time zone: UTC+3 (EAT)

Kyondo is a subcounty in Kasese District in Western Uganda. Kyondo was created in 1980, after Kisinga Subcounty was subdivided.

Kyondo Kasese is at the western end of the Uganda Railway to Kampala and Tororo and is home to Kasese Airport.

== Location and geography ==
Kyondo lies in Bukonzo County of Kasese District. Cultural heritage documentation places the site of Ekisalhalha kya Kororo at the confluence of the Kabiri and Kithangetse rivers in Kyondo Subcounty.

== History ==
Local government information on Kasese District notes that Kyondo Subcounty was formed in 1980, following the growth and subdivision of Kisinga Sub-county.

== Population ==
The Uganda Bureau of Statistics reported a population of 27,732 people and 5,507 households in Kyondo Subcounty in the 2024 census results portal. In the 2014 provisional census results, Kyondo Subcounty (Bukonzo County, Kasese District) is listed with 4,260 households and a total population of 24,005 (11,594 males and 12,411 females).

Population (selected census releases)
Census / release	Households	Males	Females	Total
2014 (provisional results)	4,260	11,594	12,411	24,005
2024 (UBOS portal)	5,507	—	—	27,732

== Culture and heritage ==
Heritage mapping work in Kasese District documents Ekisalhalha kya Kororo, a site linked to indigenous dispute resolution practices, located in Kyondo Subcounty at the confluence of the Kabiri and Kithangetse rivers. Cross-cultural heritage programming in Kasese has also referenced Kyondo Subcounty in community activities related to climate resilience and protection of local heritage sites.

== Education ==
The Ministry of Education and Sports school listings include Uganda Martyrs College, Kyondo, under Kasese District and Kyondo Subcounty.

== Administration ==
Kyondo appears as a lower local government administrative unit in national local government budget documentation for Kasese District (Vote 856), including entries for Kyondo Subcounty in the approved estimates for FY 2024/25.

== See also ==
- Kasese District
- Western Region, Uganda
