= Phionah Atuhebwe =

Ugandan vaccinologist (born 1983)

- Born: 7 May 1983 (age 43); Uganda
- Occupation: Medical doctor/public health specialist
- Known for: Vaccinologist

Phionah Atuhebwe (born 7 May 1983) is a Ugandan vaccinologist and immunization expert. She is currently a Senior Health Adviser on Immunization with UNICEF Headquarters in New York City, USA while based in Nairobi, Kenya. Phionah was the Officer in charge of introduction of new vaccines Africa at World Health Organization until May 2023.

== Early life and education ==
Phionah Atuhebwe was born on 7 May 1983 at Mbarara Regional Referral Hospital, in Mbarara City, to Mr and Mrs Aloysious S.J. Tibamanya. She attended St. Helen's Primary School and St. Aloysious P.S Mbarara, for Primary Education; Bweranyangi Girls' SSS, Bushenyi, for O-level; and Uganda Martyrs Namugongo for A-level. She graduated with a Bachelor of Medicine, Bachelor of Surgery (M.B.B.S), Medicine and Surgery. She received a Master of International Public Health/International Health from University of Leeds. She also studied Project Leadership, Project Management at Cornell University and Vaccinology at University of Cape Town.

== Career ==
As New Vaccines Introduction Medical Officer Africa, Atuhebwe sits at the World Health Organization's Regional Office for Africa in Brazzaville, Congo. She is recognized as one of Africa's biggest contributors to the continent's immunization programmes. Her current role at WHO, is to Support coordination of Targeted Country Assistance to countries in the WHO African region to prepare and submit Gavi applications for financial support, planning and implementation of new vaccination activities. Lead the allocation of new vaccine doses to priority countries in the African region in collaboration with Gavi and UNICEF supply division, among other important roles.

Atuhebwe's most recent achievement is her support in Zimbabwe for the first ever use of a Typhoid vaccine in response to an outbreak in Africa. She has also been at the front line fighting COVID-19. She was one of the first Medical officers in Africa, to openly announce that she tested positive for COVID-19 and healed. She shared her story with the Media. On April 12, Easter Sunday, Atuhebwe received an email that she, alongside 43 colleagues had to turn up for a coronavirus test. Days later, she received a call from the doctor, they wanted to give her an update on the tests and find out if she was doing well. He informed her that among the 44 tests done, four had returned positive. “And my response was, oh, sorry.” Just like any one would sympathise with the affected. When she wasn't expecting it, the doctor dropped the bombshell; “...unfortunately, you are one of them” The Daily Monitor writes. Atuhebwe had been in Congo-Brazzaville for more than a month, alongside other doctors that were working tirelessly to ensure the continent has everything that can enable her fight the virus.

From October 2014 to July 2017, Atuhebwe worked as Africa and Asia Regional Technical Advisor, Vaccine Access and Delivery, PATH International (East, Central, Southern and Anglophone Africa)

== Awards ==
- International Development Centre-Canada Research Award
- Ruth Griffith Prize, University of Leeds, 2011
- Joint Japan/World Bank Graduate Scholarship
