= Kilembe Mines =

Copper and cobalt mine in Uganda

Coordinates: 00°12′30″N 30°00′25″E

- Kirembe mines
- Interactive map of Kilembe Mines
- Location: Located in Kilembe, a suburb of the town of Kasese, in the foothills of the Rwenzori Mountains in the Western Region of Uganda.
- Products: copper
- Production: Excess of 4,000,000 tonnes
- Opened: 1950
- Company: Tibet-Hima Mining Company Limited

Kilembe Mines is a copper and cobalt mine in Uganda, the third-largest economy in the East African Community.

== Location ==
The mine is located in Kilembe, a suburb of the town of Kasese, in the foothills of the Rwenzori Mountains in the Western Region of Uganda The mine is approximately 380 kilometres (236 mi), by road, west of Kampala, the country's capital and largest city. The coordinates of Kilembe Mines are:0°12'30.0"N, 30°00'25.0"E (Latitude:0.208333; Longitude:30.006944).

== Overview ==
Kilembe Mines is Uganda's largest copper mine, with estimated deposits of copper in excess of 4,000,000 tonnes and an undetermined amount of cobalt ore. In addition, there approximately 2,800 acres (1,100 ha), of unexplored acreage at the site.

== History ==
In July 1950, two Canadian mining companies, Frosbisher Limited and Ventures Limited, formed a joint venture, named Kilembe Mines Limited, whose objective was to mine copper from under the Rwenzori Mountains near Kasese. Kilembe Mines Limited built and operated a copper smelter in Jinja and maintained offices in Kampala, the country's capital. Other assets include a housing estate for staff in Kasese and the 5MW Mubuku I Power Station in the Rwenzori Mountains.

In 1962, Kilembe Mines Limited was acquired by Falconbridge of Africa, who sold it to the Government of Uganda in 1975. Copper extraction ceased in 1982 due to dilapidated equipment, high inflation and insecurity.

In 2013, after nearly 30 years of dormancy and after several failed attempts to privatize the mine, a consortium led by Tibet-Hima Mining Company Limited, won the competitive bid to manage, rehabilitate and operate Kilembe Mines Limited for 25 years from 2013 until 2038. In exchange for those rights, the consortium paid a cash down payment of US$4.3 million and is expected to make an annual payment of US$1 million until the end of the concession. Also, the consortium will invest US$135 million into rehabilitating and improving the mine and will increase the capacity of Mubuku I Power Station to 12MW. In addition to the cash payments above, the Ugandan government will receive royalties on the minerals extracted as well as taxes from Kilembe Mines Limited business operations.

== Recent events ==
As of June 2015, the managers at Kilembe have set September 2015 to resume copper extraction. The mine will be revived in stages. A copper smelter will be constructed at Kilembe to process the ore and produce 99.9% pure copper for export. When fully operational, the mine will employ 4,000 full-time workers.

On September 14, 2022, the Ministry of Finance, Planning and Economic Development appointed a new board of directors for Kilembe Mines Limited, the governing company for the mines. Hon. Sanjay Tanna, a prominent businessman and politician who was the former Member of Parliament for Tororo Municipality, was sworn in as the board chairman, alongside Atwoki Gilbert Mujogya, Ruth Sengonzi, Semitala Nobert, Eric Chandiga and Hon. Loice Bira Bwambale, who all serve as board members. Ministers Ruth Nankabirwa Sentamu and Evelyn Anite of the Ministry of Energy and Mineral Development and Ministry of State for Privatisation and Investment, respectively, unveiled plans for the redevelopment of Kilembe Mines, which is expected to bring about industrialization, employment opportunities, and additional revenue. With the new board leadership, several companies are expected to express interest in partnering with the government through a Mineral Production Sharing Agreement (MPSA). The restoration of the mines and the process of procuring an investor is a significant step to achieve this goal, according to the government. Kilembe Mines is known to contain reserves and resources of copper in ore and tailings, as well as potential for cobalt, copper, and associated base metals, making it a key element in the transition to clean energy. The current price of copper is between $ 10,000 and $ 10,500 per tonne.

== Board of Directors KML (2022) ==
| Hon Sanjay Tanna | Chairman |
| Atwoki Gilbert Mujogya | Member |
| Ruth Sengonzi | Member |
| Semitala Nobert | Member |
| Eric Chandiga | Member |
| Hon. Loice Bira Bwambale | Member |

== See also ==
- Kilembe Mines FC
- List of power stations in Uganda
- Mining industry of Uganda
- Energy in Uganda
