= Hima, Uganda =

Ugandan town

Hima
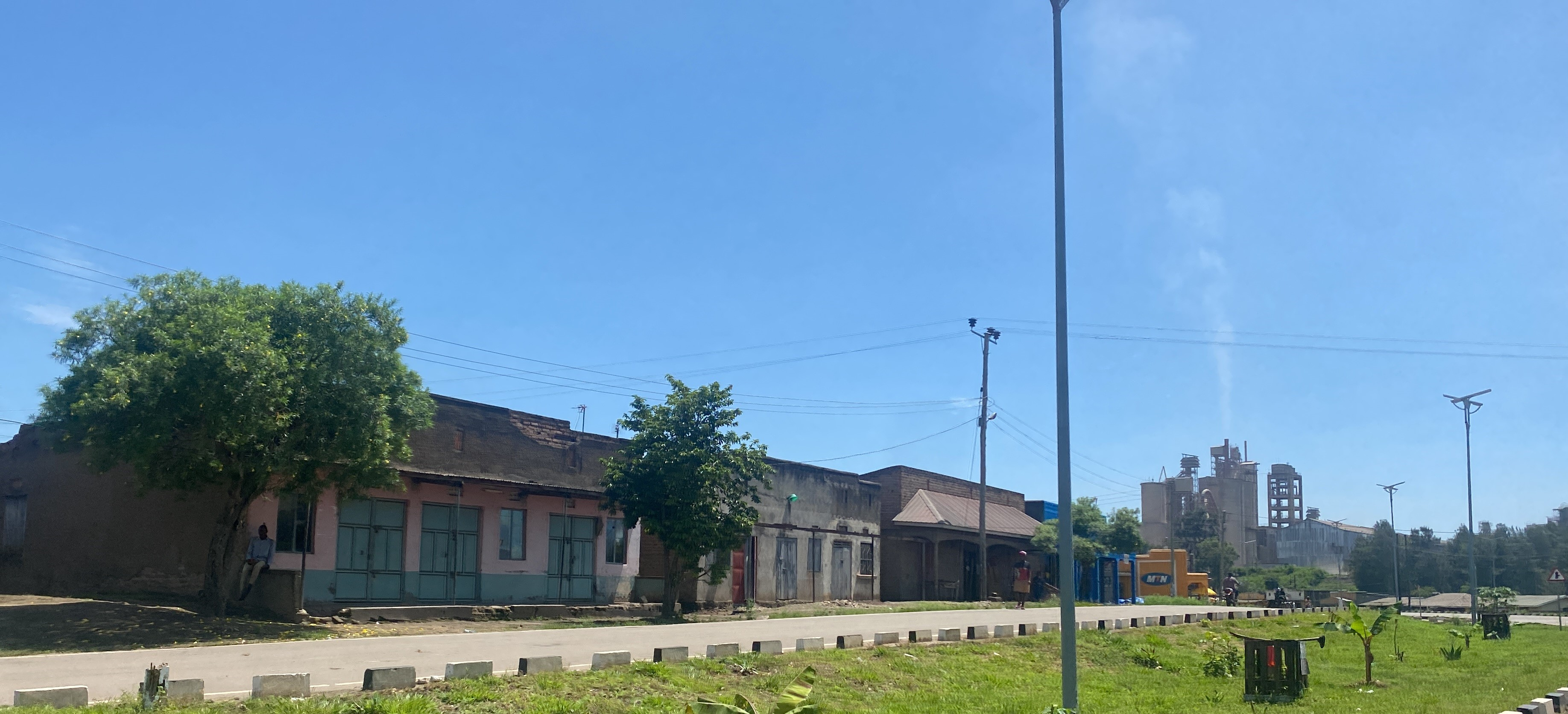
- Hima town in kasese District

- Location in Uganda
- Coordinates: 00°17′26″N 30°10′39″E
- Country: Uganda
- Region: Western Uganda
- Sub-region: Rwenzururu sub-region
- District: Kasese District
- Elevation: 3,222 ft (982 m)

Population (2019 Estimate)
  - Total: 14,700
- Climate: Aw

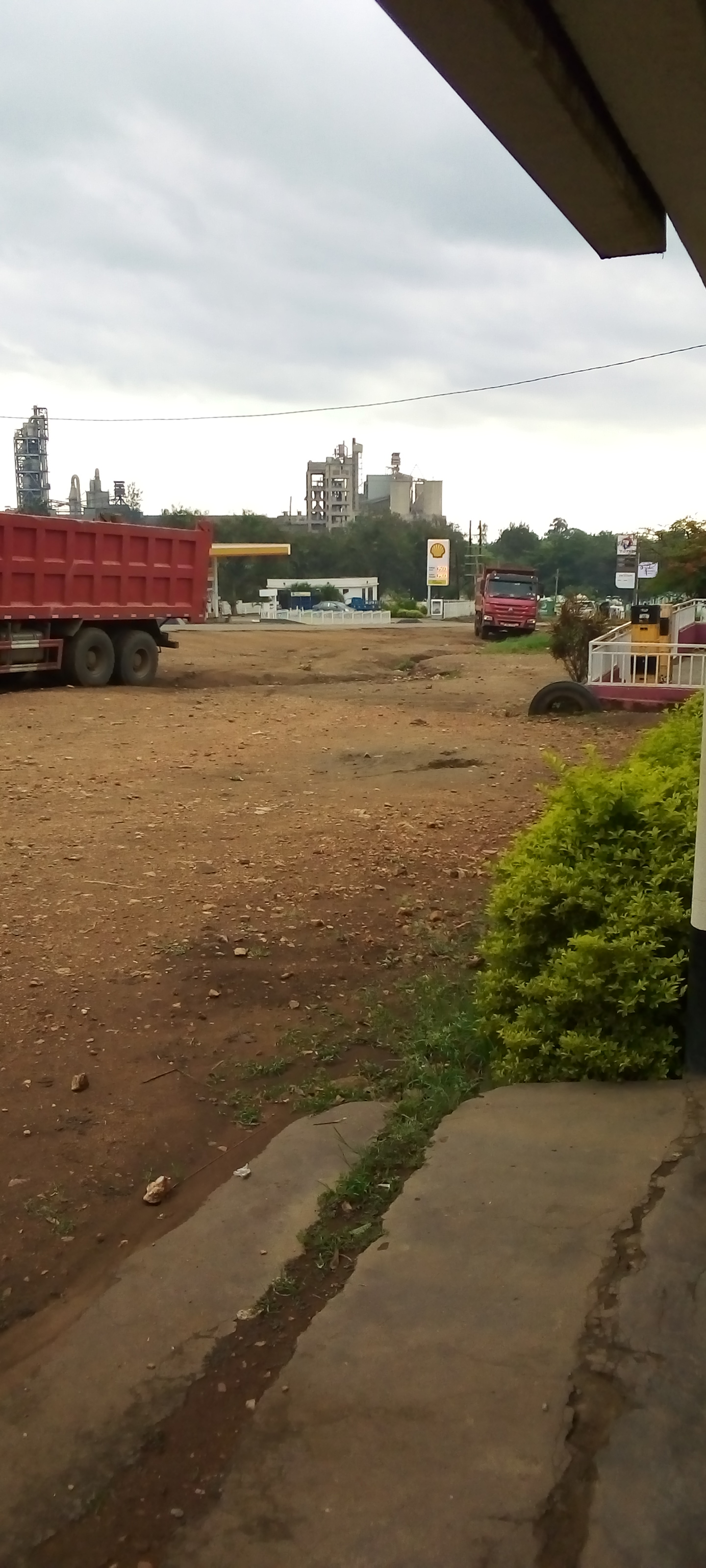
Human cement on background, located next to Hima-Fort Portal road, Western Uganda.

Hima is a town in the Western Region of Uganda. It is an industrial town, involved primarily in the manufacture of cement.

== Location ==
Hima is located in Kitswamba Parish, Busongora County, Kasese District, in Western Uganda. The town lies along the Fort Portal–Kasese–Mpondwe Road, approximately 23.5 kilometres (15 mi), by road, northeast of Kasese, the largest town in the Rwenzururu sub-region. This is approximately 57 kilometres (35 mi), by road, southwest of Fort Portal, the nearest large city. The coordinates of the town are:0°17'26.0"N, 30°10'39.0"E (Latitude:0.290556; 30.177500). Hima sits at an average elevation of 982 metres (3,222 ft) above mean sea level.

== Population ==
The 2002, the national population census gave the population of Hima at 7,075 people. In 2014, the national population census and household survey, enumerated the towns population at 13,135. The Uganda Bureau of Statistics (UBOS), estimated the mid-year population in 2019, at 14,700. The table below illustrates the same data in a tabular format.

Year	Population
2002	7,075
2014	13,135
2019	14,700

== Economy ==
The town is the headquarters of Hima Cement Limited, the second-largest manufacturer of cement in Uganda, producing about 1,700,000 tonnes (1,873,929 tons) annually. Hima Cement is a subsidiary of LafargeHolcim, a Swiss conglomerate, that manufactures building materials, with subsidiaries in about 80 countries around the globe, with about 72,500 employees. Hima Cement is the largest employer in town, with 320 permanent employees and about 200 contractors at the company headquarters. The company maintains two production lines at Hima, with combined production capacity at this site of 850,000 tonnes (936,965 tons) of cement powder. The company maintains another factory at Tororo, in the Eastern Region of Uganda, with equivalent production capacity.

== Transport ==
The Fort Portal–Kasese–Mpondwe Road passes through the town in a north to south direction. The nearest airport is Kasese Airport, located approximately 23.5 kilometres (15 mi), south of town.

== See also ==
- Kasese District
- Rwenzururu
- Western Region, Uganda
- List of cities and towns in Uganda
- Economy of Uganda
