= Kazinga Channel =

River in Uganda

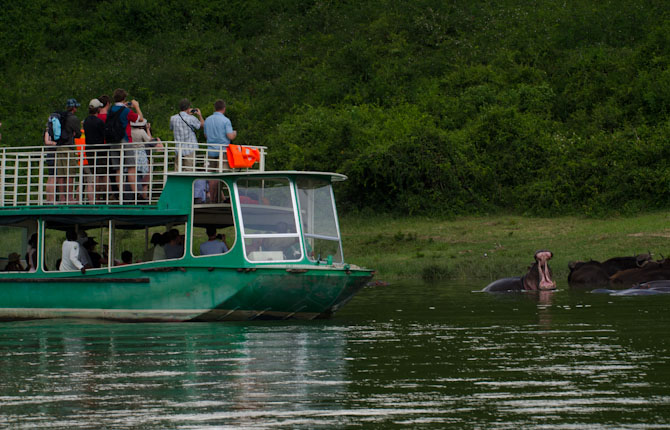
- The Kazinga Channel in Queen Elizabeth National Park, showing hippos and waterway

Location
- Country: Uganda
- Region: Western Region
- National park: Queen Elizabeth National Park

Physical characteristics
- Source: Lake George
  - location: Queen Elizabeth National Park
  - coordinates: 0.070961°S 29.157595°E
- Mouth: Lake Edward
  - location: Queen Elizabeth National Park
  - coordinates: 0.209122°S 29.887056°E
- Length: 32 km (20 mi)

Basin features
- Waterbodies: Lake George, Lake Edward

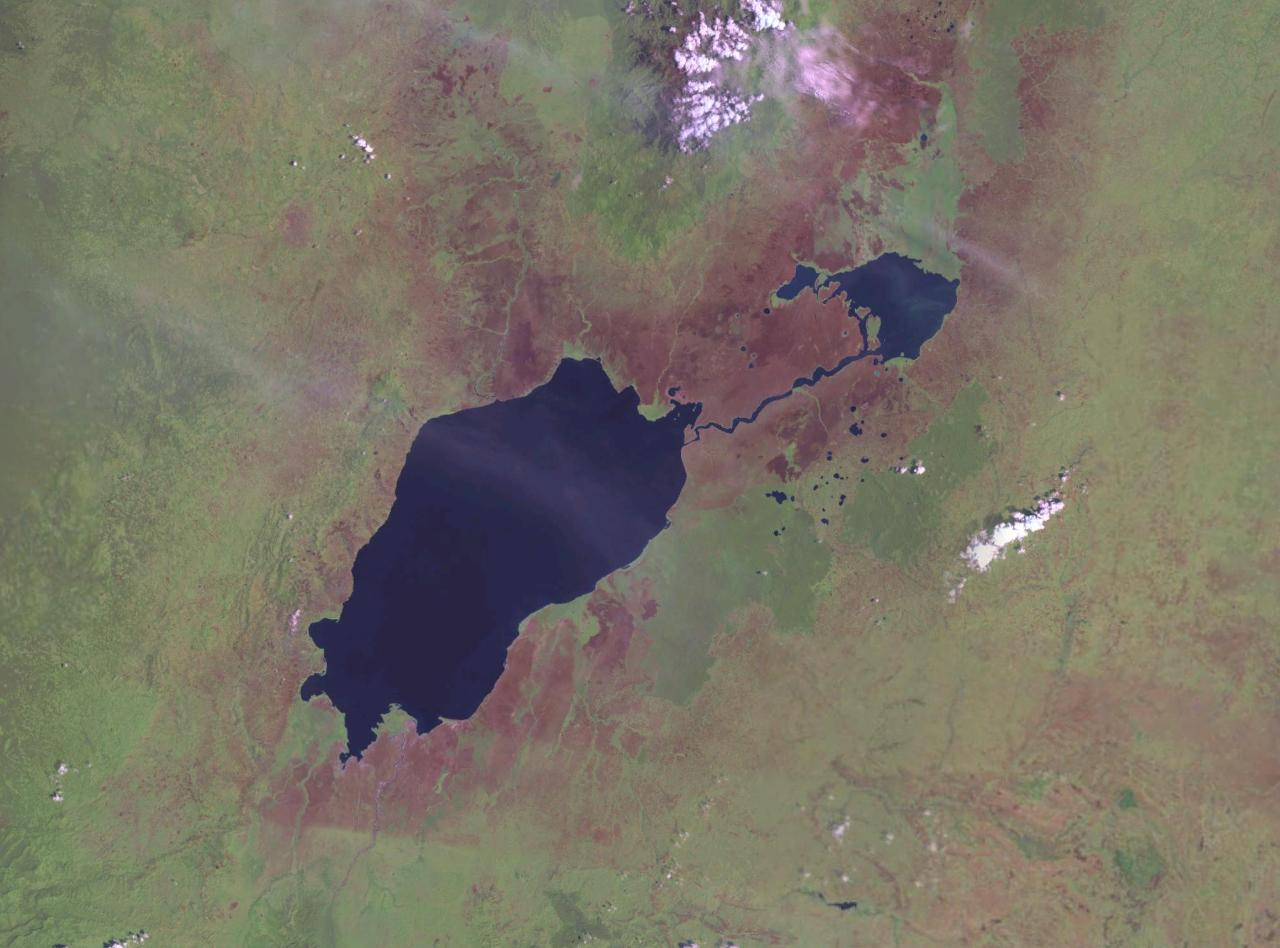
Lake Edward (larger) and Lake George (smaller) connected by the Kazinga Channel

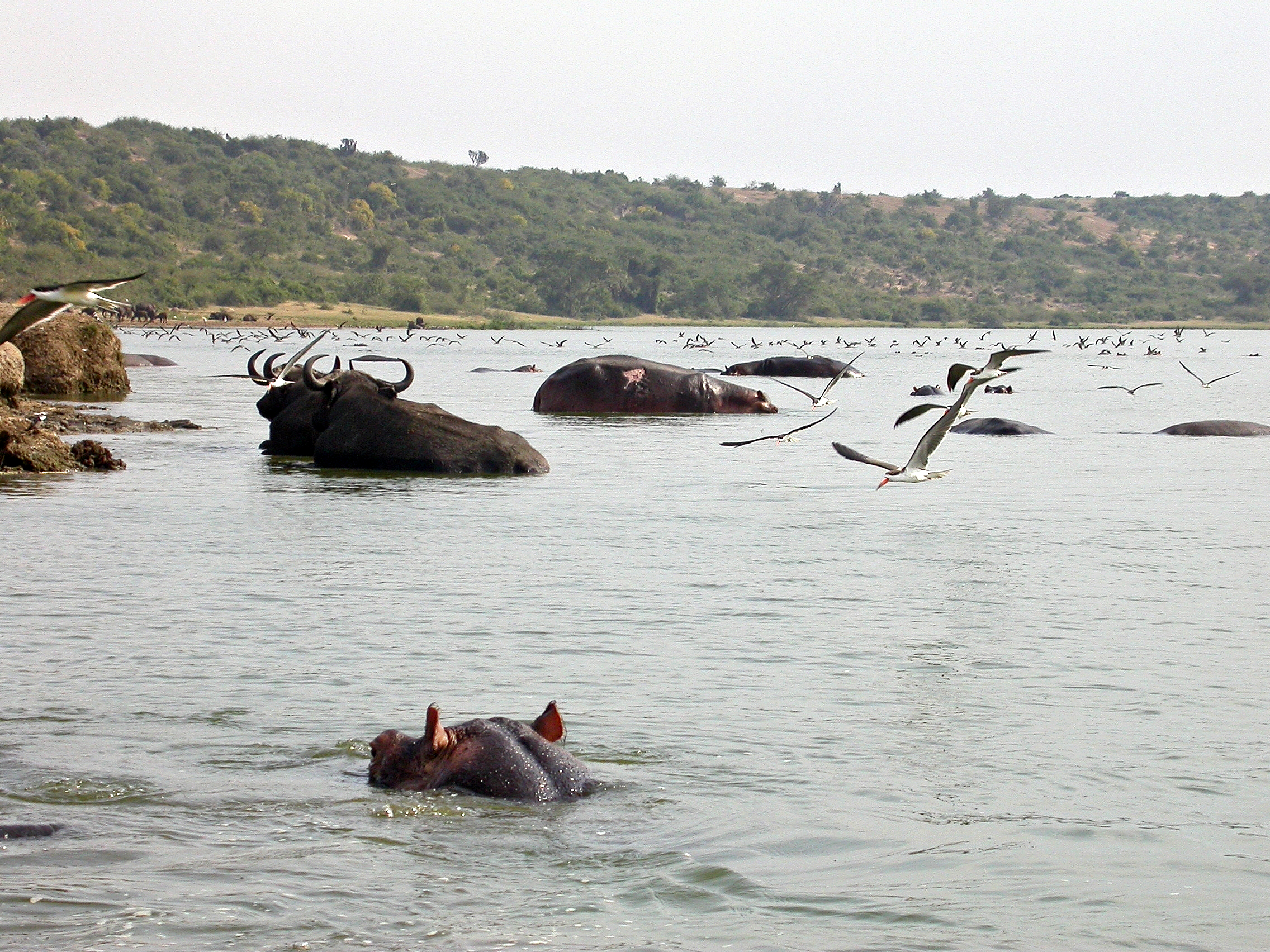
Hippos at Kazinga Channel

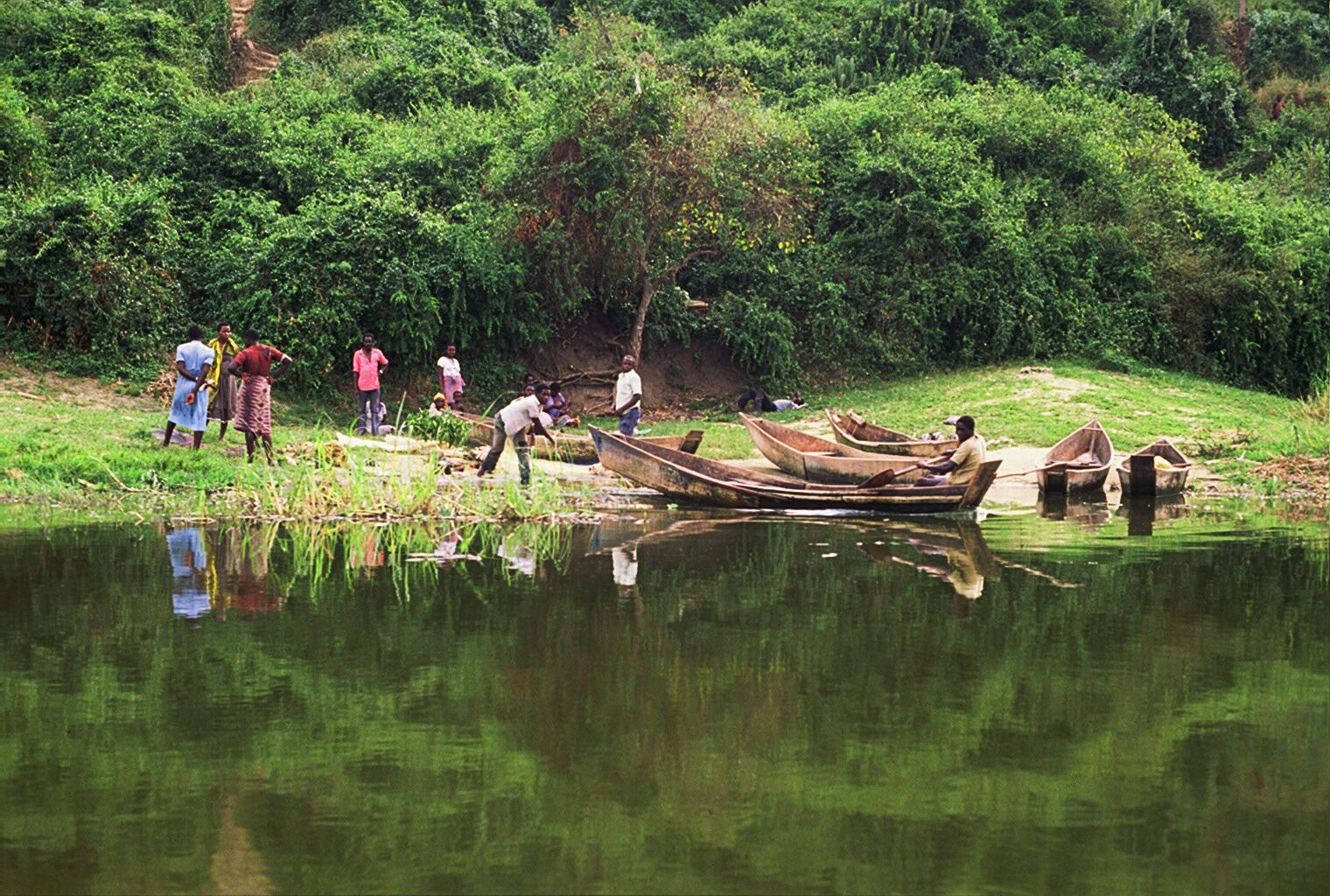
Fishermen at the Kazinga Channel

Kazinga Channel in Uganda is a wide, 32-kilometre (20 mi) long natural channel that links Lake Edward and Lake George, which are part of the African Great Lakes system.

== Location ==
Kazinga Channel is located in South Western Uganda near Katunguru area within the famous Queen Elizabeth National Park.

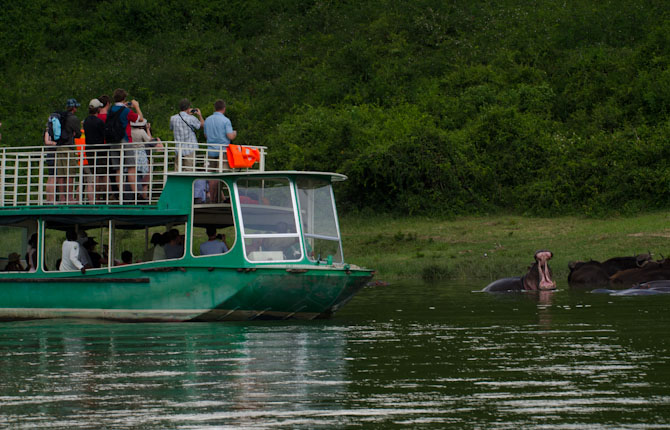
Kazinga Channel in Queen Elizabeth National Park.jpg

== Overview ==
The channel is a dominant feature of Queen Elizabeth National Park. It attracts a varied range of animals and birds, boasting one of the world's largest concentration of hippos and numerous Nile crocodiles.

In 2005, a large number of hippos were killed in the channel as a result of an anthrax outbreak, which occurs when animals eat remnants of vegetation during the driest months, leading to the absorption of bacterial spores that can live for decades in dry soil.

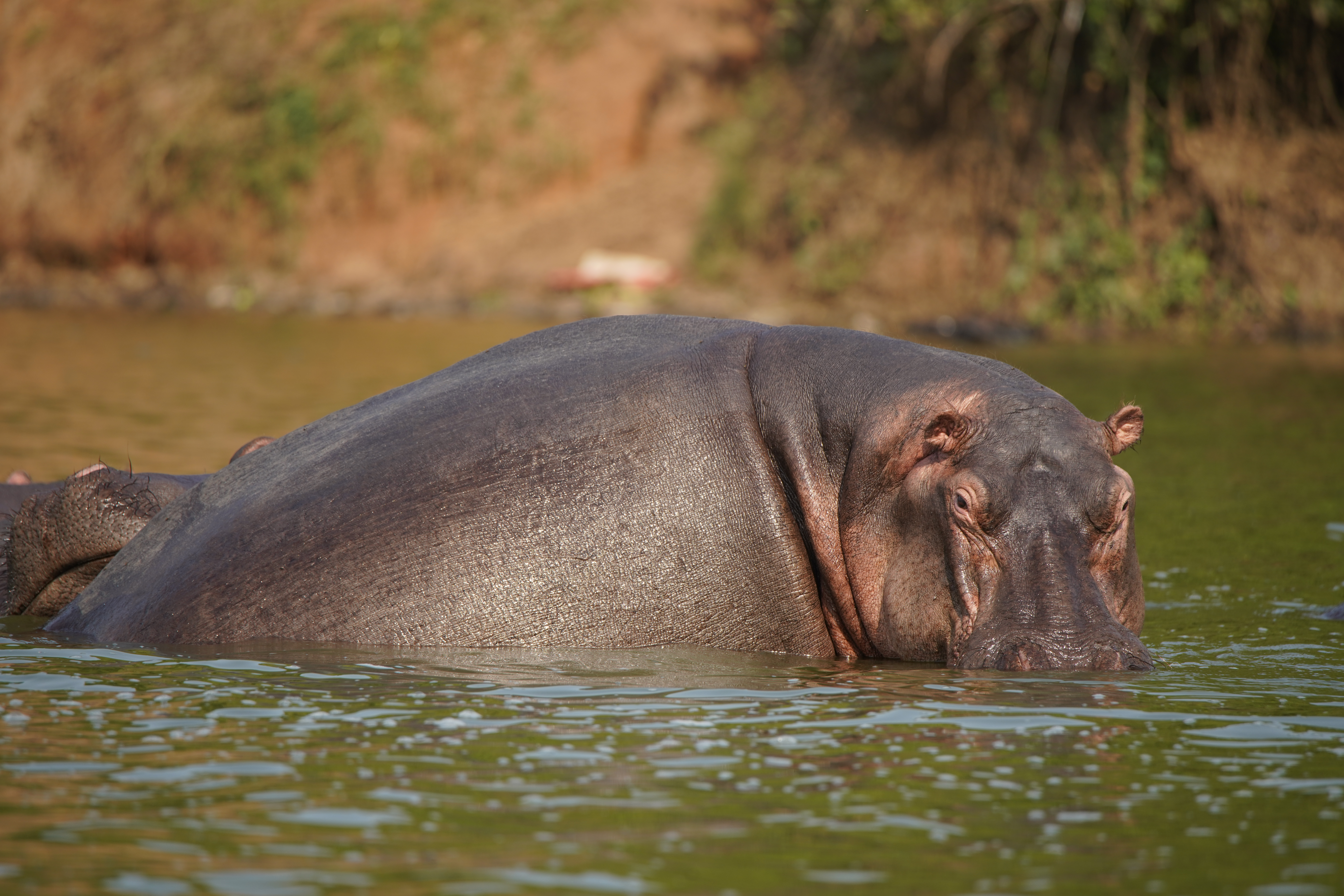
Queen Elizabeth National Park. Hippo in Kazinga Channel

The channel is described as a popular wildlife tourism area.

== Developments ==
The Kazinga Channel Bridge previously known as "Katunguru Bridge", constructed in 1954, connects the two sections of Queen Elizabeth National Park. It plays a vital role in facilitating transportation and access within the park, making it easier for visitors to explore different areas. It was expeditiously rebuilt in 2022.

== See also ==
- Queen Elizabeth National Park
- Kagera River
- Katonga River
- Nile
- River Muzizi
- White Nile
- List of rivers in Uganda
