= Lake George (Uganda) =

Lake in Uganda

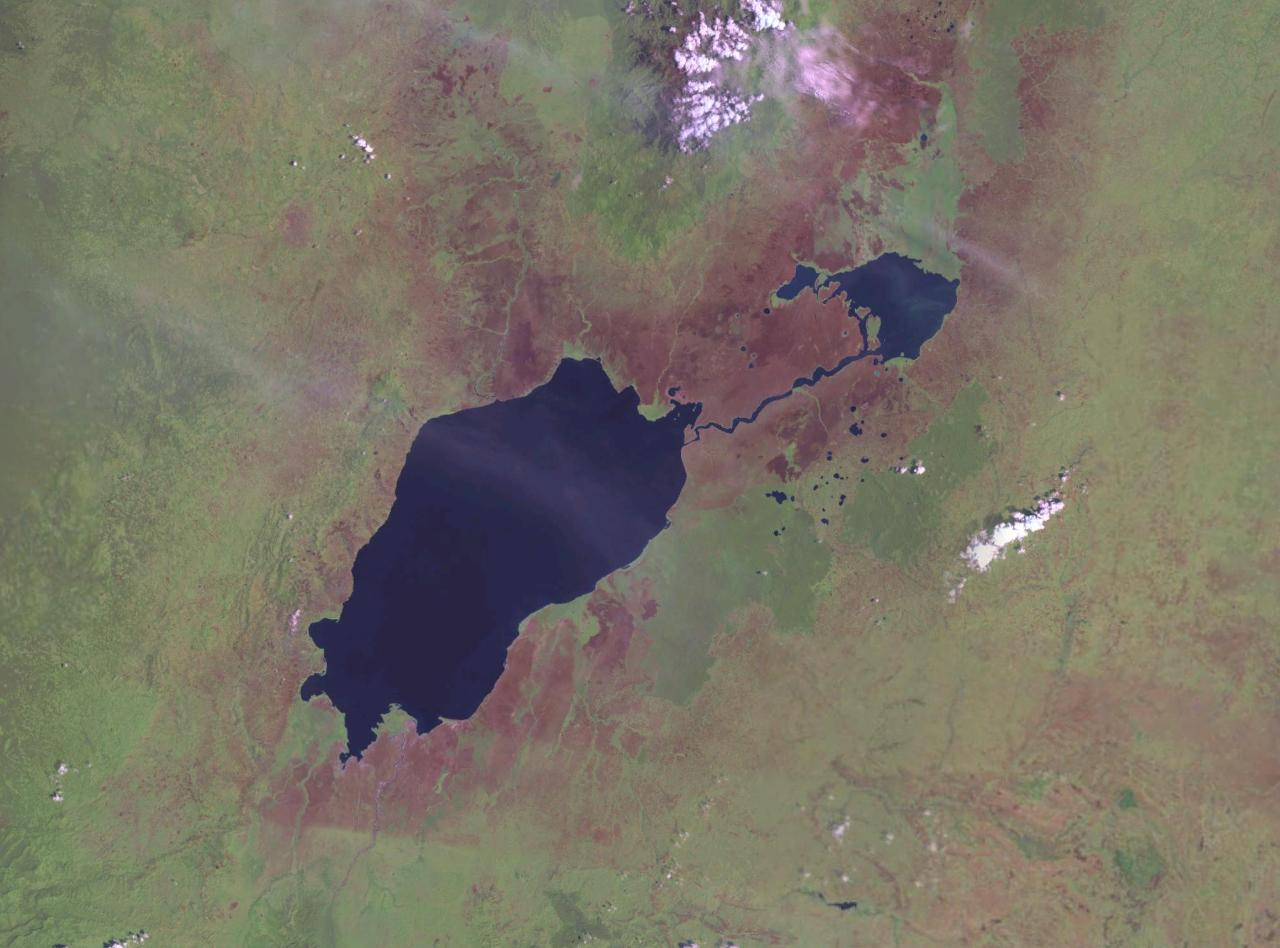
- Satellite photo of Lake Edward (left) and smaller Lake George (right) with the Kazinga Channel between them

- Location within Uganda
- Coordinates: 0°00′N 30°12′E
- Primary outflows: Kazinga Channel
- Basin countries: Uganda
- Surface area: 250 square kilometres (97 mi^{2})

Ramsar Wetland
- Designated: 4 March 1988
- Reference no.: 394

Lake George or Lake Katunguru is a lake in Uganda. It has a surface area of 250 square kilometres (97 mi^{2}) and is a part of the African Great Lakes system, although it is not considered one of the Great Lakes. Like the other lakes in the region, it was renamed after a member of the British royal family, in this case, Prince George, later to become King George V. Lake George drains to the southwest into Lake Edward through the Kazinga Channel.

The area surrounding the lake is populated by the Batooro, Basongora, Banyampaka and Banyankore peoples, among others. All these nations speak closely related dialects which are generally referred to as Runyakitara language. Akatunguru is a word which means ‘onion’ and is used by all these different peoples. Thus, the lake came to be known as Katunguru because of its onion-like shape.

Welsh explorer Henry Morton Stanley was the first European to see the lake in 1875, after following the course of the Katonga River from Lake Victoria during his trans-Africa expedition. Thinking it was part of Lake Albert, he renamed it Beatrice Gulf. Exploration plans were aborted because of the threat of conflict with the kingdom of Bunyoro. On his second visit to the area, in 1888 during the Emin Pasha Relief Expedition, Stanley discovered Lake Edward, and realizing that there were two independent lakes, gave Lake George its current name.

== Geography and hydrology ==
Lake George is located at 0°0'N, 30°12'E and having an altitude of 914 m above sea level. The equator bisects the lake. Lake George is fed by rivers flowing from the Rwenzori Mountains these are Rumi, Mubuku and Nsonge with outflows to Kaziga Channel which connect Lake George and Lake Edward.

Surface area [km2]	250
Volume [km3]	0.8
Maximum depth [m]	4.5
Mean depth [m]	2.4
Water level	Unregulated
Normal range of annual water level fluctuation [m]	0.1
Residence time [yr]	0.3
Catchment area [km2]	9,705

== Ecology and biodiversity ==
Lakes and mountains of western Uganda

In March 1988, Lake George was designated Uganda’s first Ramsar Wetland of International Importance hence underscoring it's biodiversity significance.

The lake is eutrophic and alkaline because of the blue-green algae which are heavy with nutrients and are contributing to its characteristic green coloration as viewed from satellites. It supports wetlands and shorelines which are habitats to over 150 bird species which includes the uncommon saddle-billed stork as well as hippopotamuses, elephants, Nile crocodiles and sitatunga antelopes. It has a rich species diversity economically important to fisheries including tilapia, several species of cichlids, as well as lungfish (Protopterus aethiopicus) and several species of catfish (Bagrus docmac and Clarias gariepinus).

== Human activity and tourism ==
The Lake George location is within the Queen Elizabeth National Park which makes it recan a significant feature for tourism. People in the surrounding region make a living from fishing and thus depend on the region’s renowned fishing stocks. People can also go for boat rides, birdwatching, canoe rides, as well as watching wildlife such as hippos, birds, and even antelopes in the wetlands.

== Gallery ==
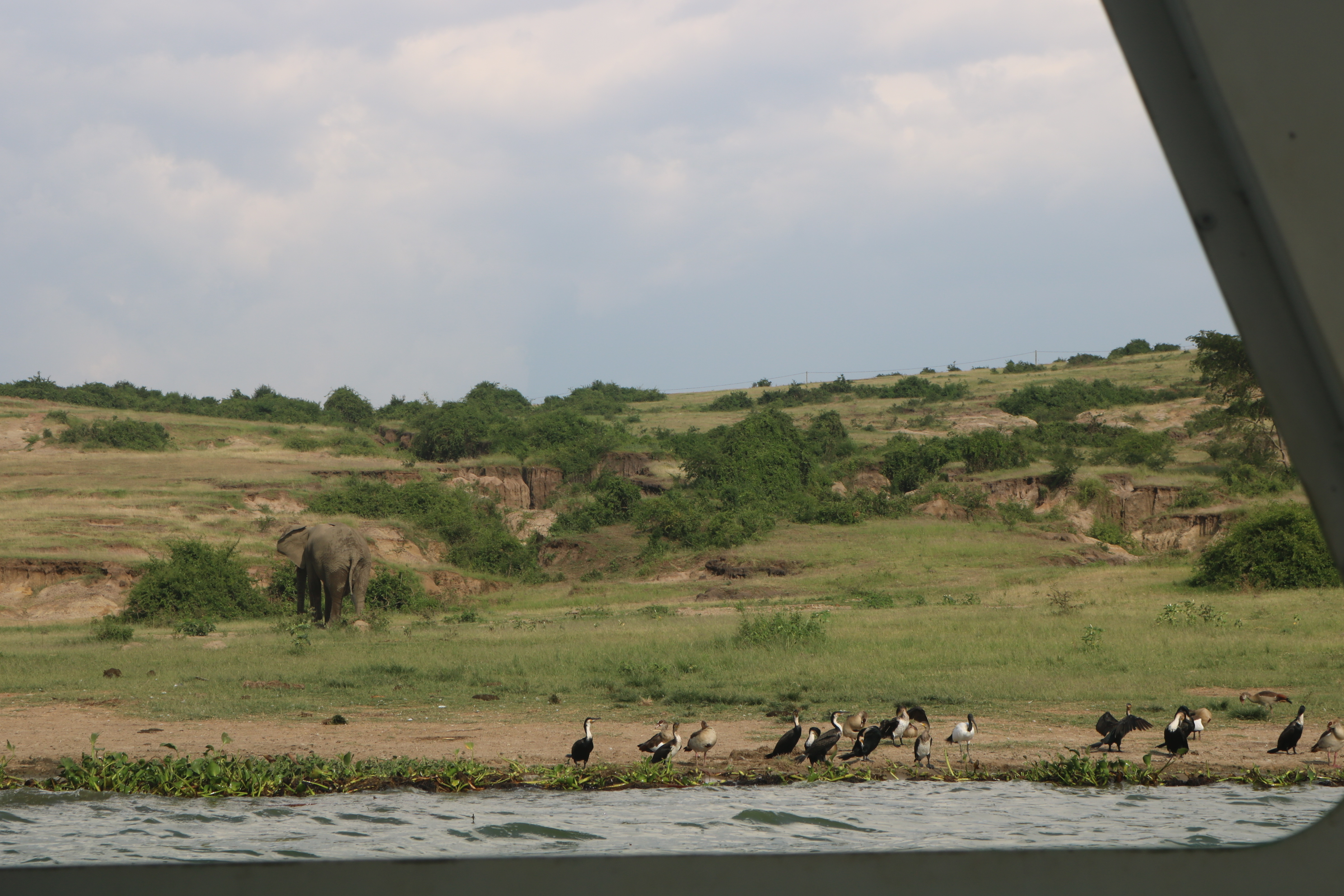
Wild Life at the banks of Kazinga channel, Queen Elizabeth National Park

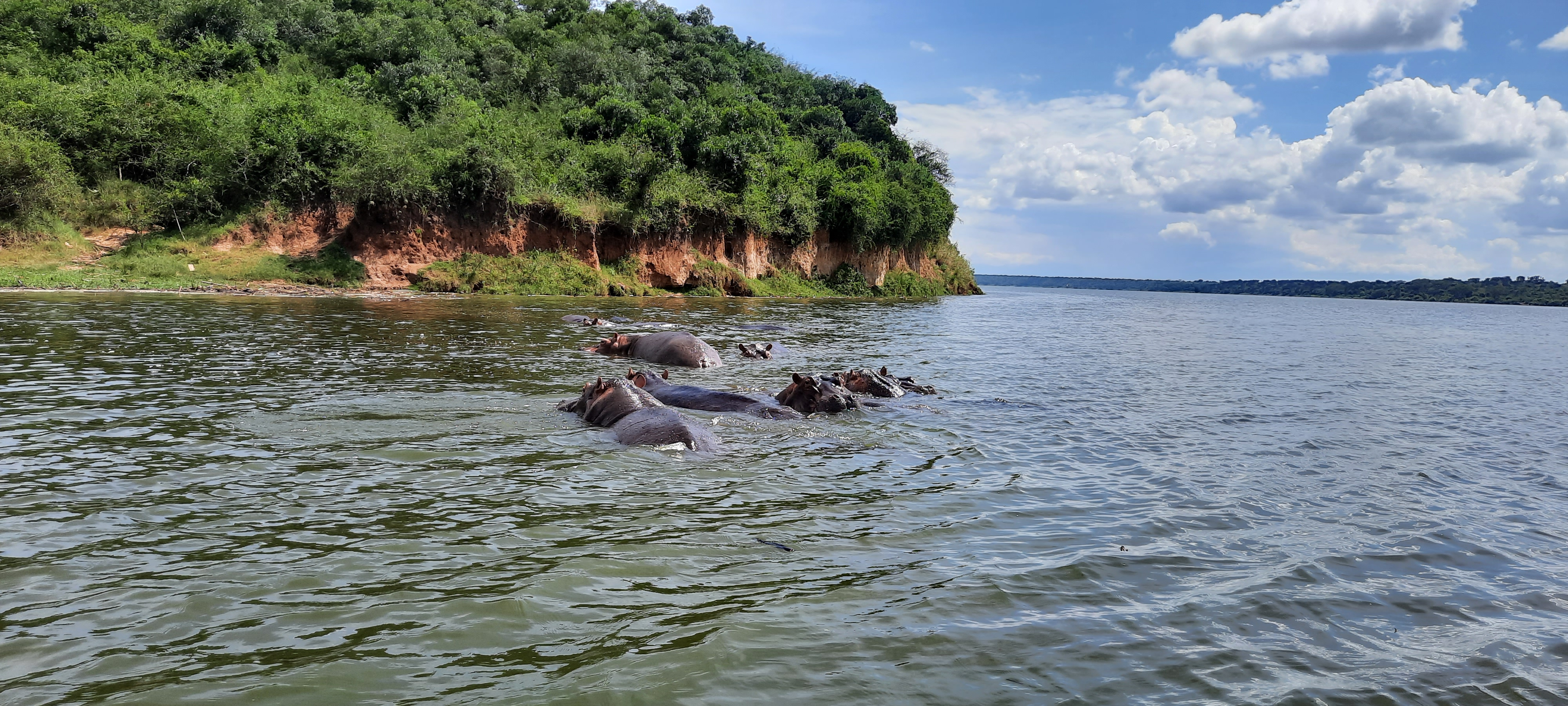
Kazinga Channel linking Lake George and Lake Edward

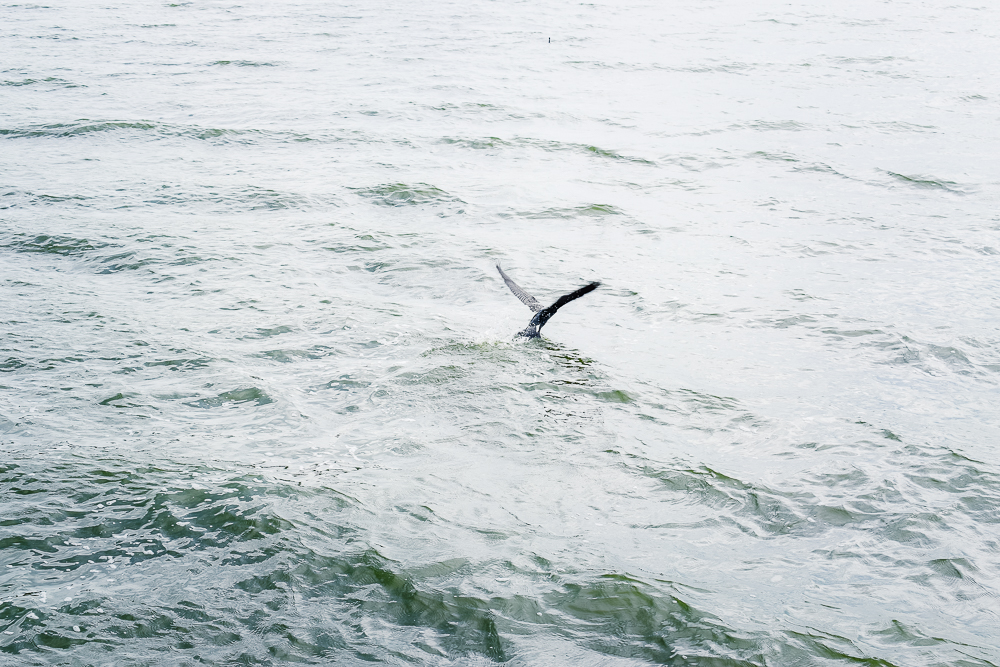
Feathers in Flight; Birds Flock Behind Our Boat, Seizing Opportunities on Kazinga Channel.

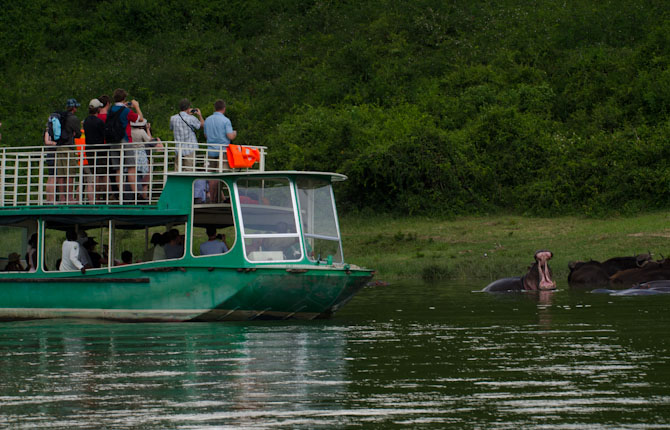
Kazinga Channel in Queen Elizabeth National Park watching wildlife.

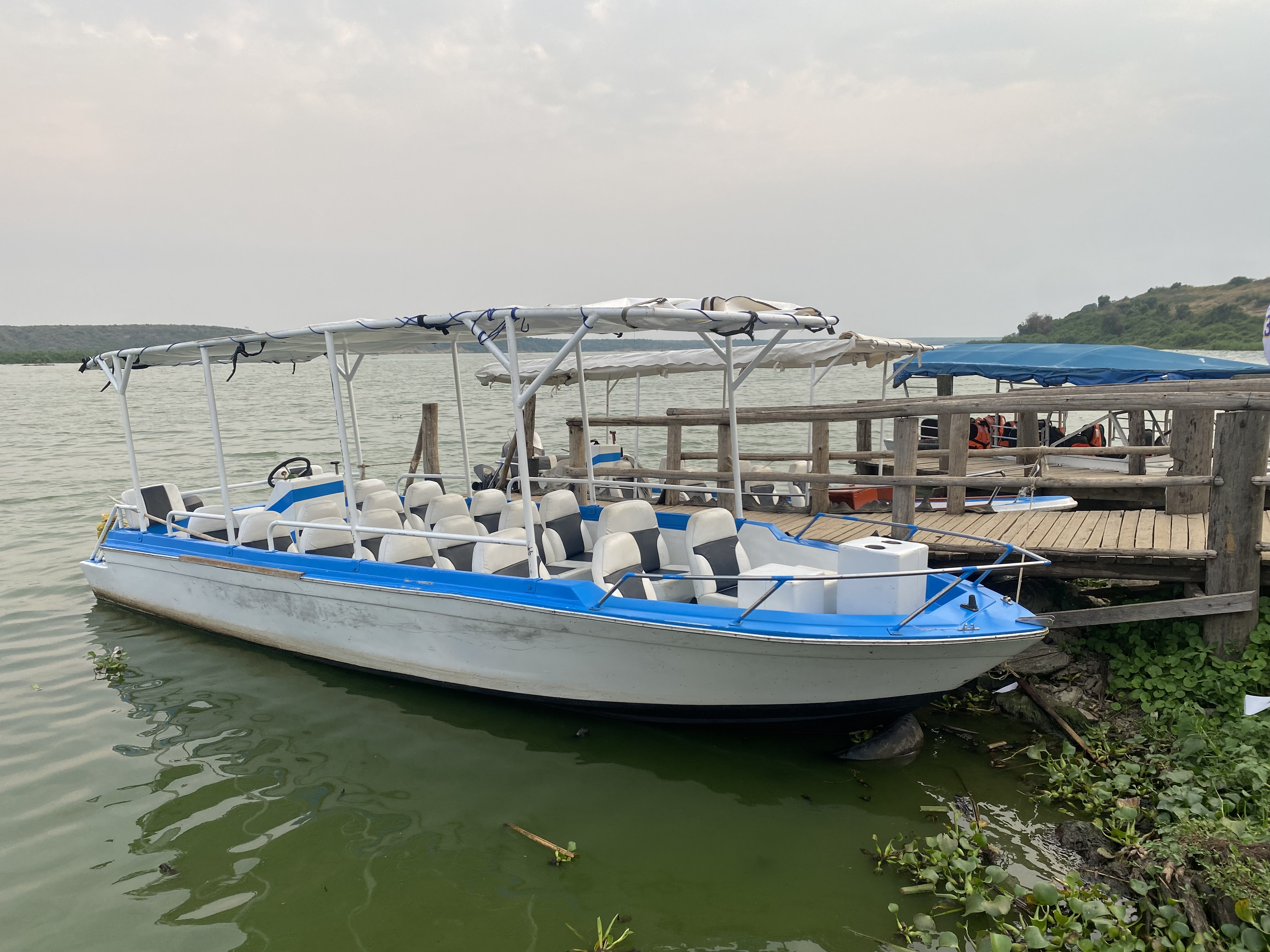
Passenger boats at Kazinga Channel in Kasese district in western Uganda
