= Kasese =

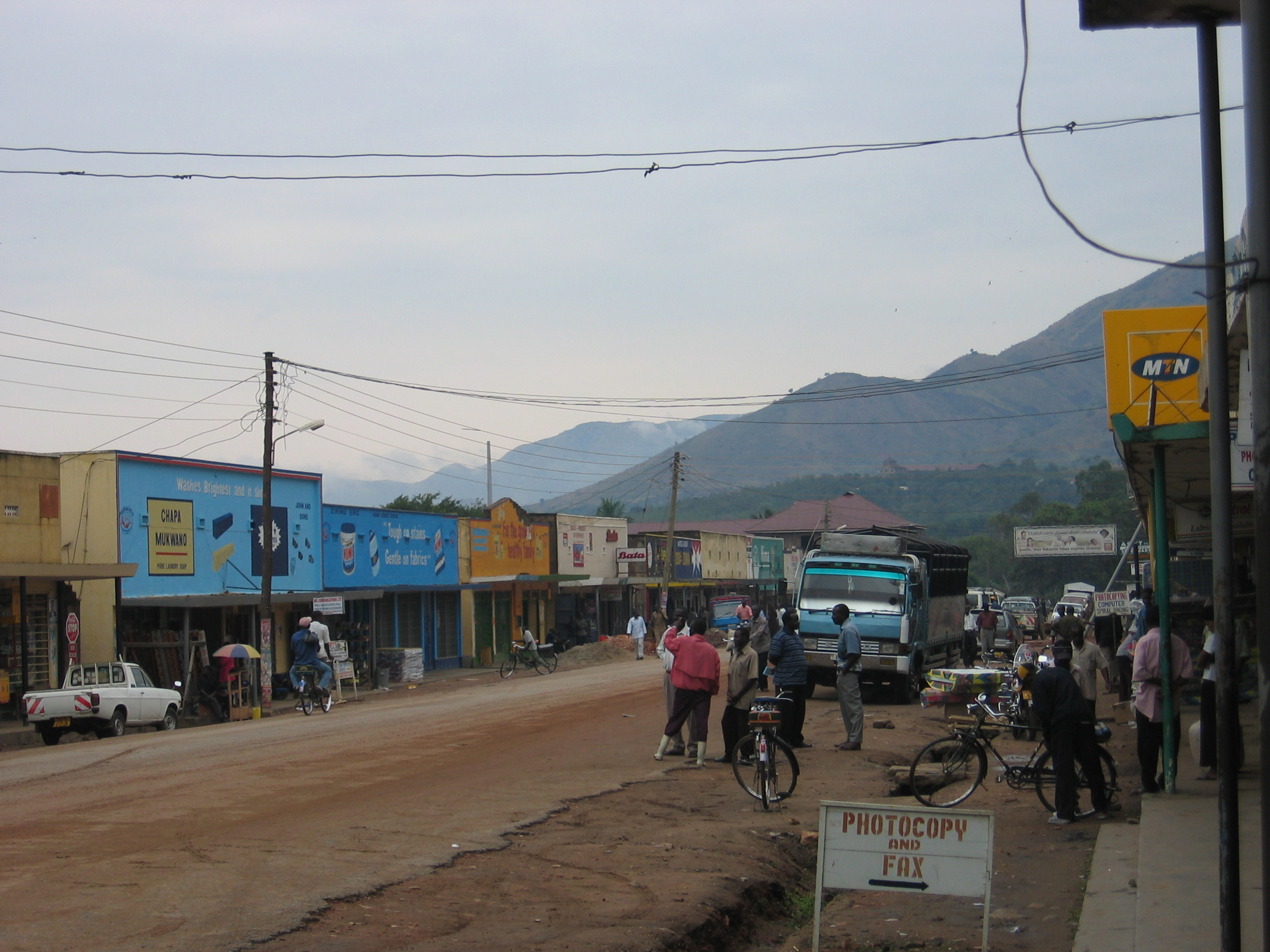

- Location in Uganda
- Coordinates: 0°11′12″N 30°05′17″E
- Country: Uganda
- Region: Western Region
- Sub-region: Rwenzururu region
- District: Kasese District

Government
  - Mayor: chassy Kahindo
  - Member of Parliament: Hon. Kambale Ferigo
- Elevation: 3,300 ft (1,000 m)

Population (2024 Census)
  - Total: 133,629
- Climate: Aw

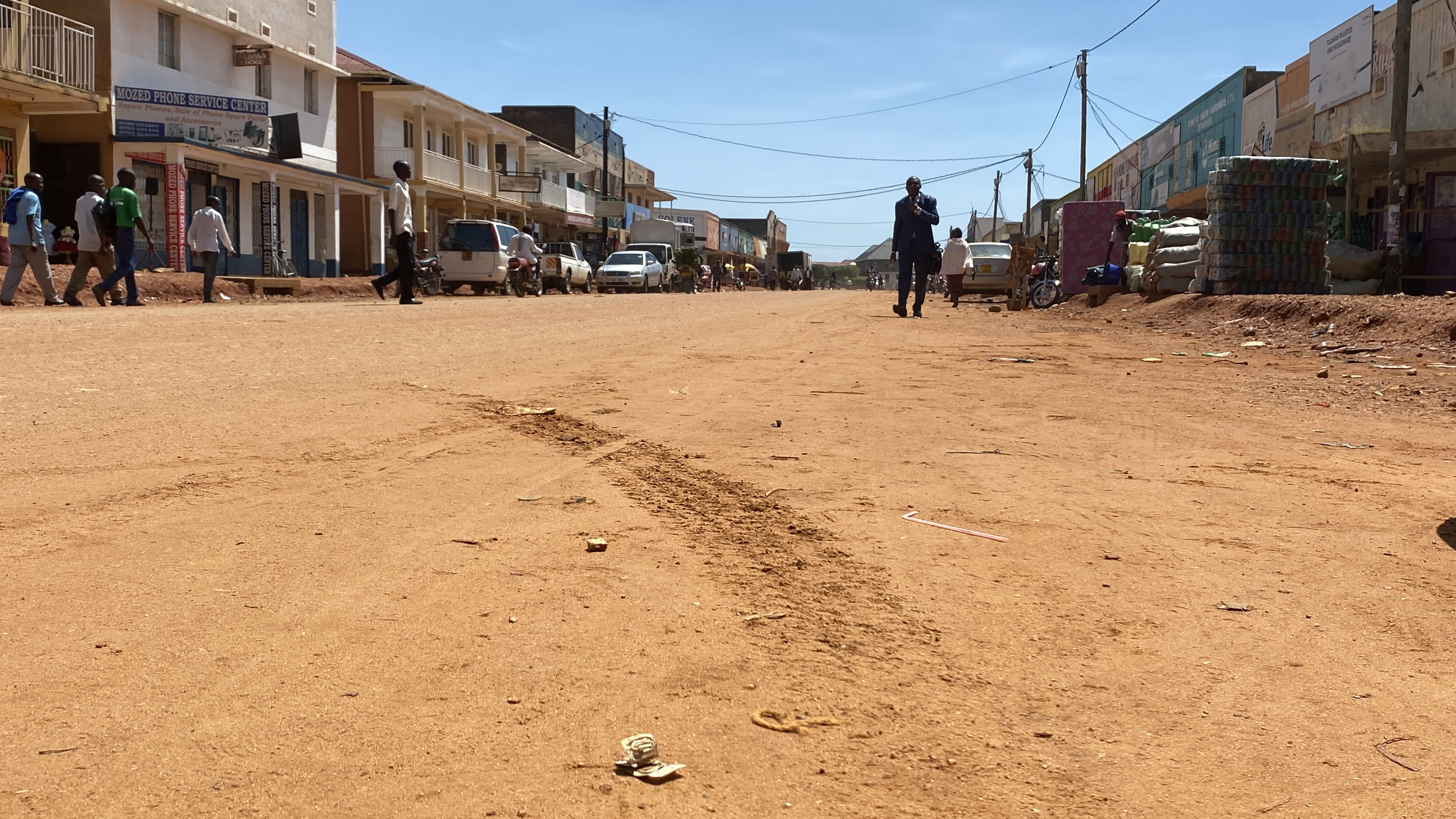
Street view of Kasese town showing roads and buildings in the western Uganda

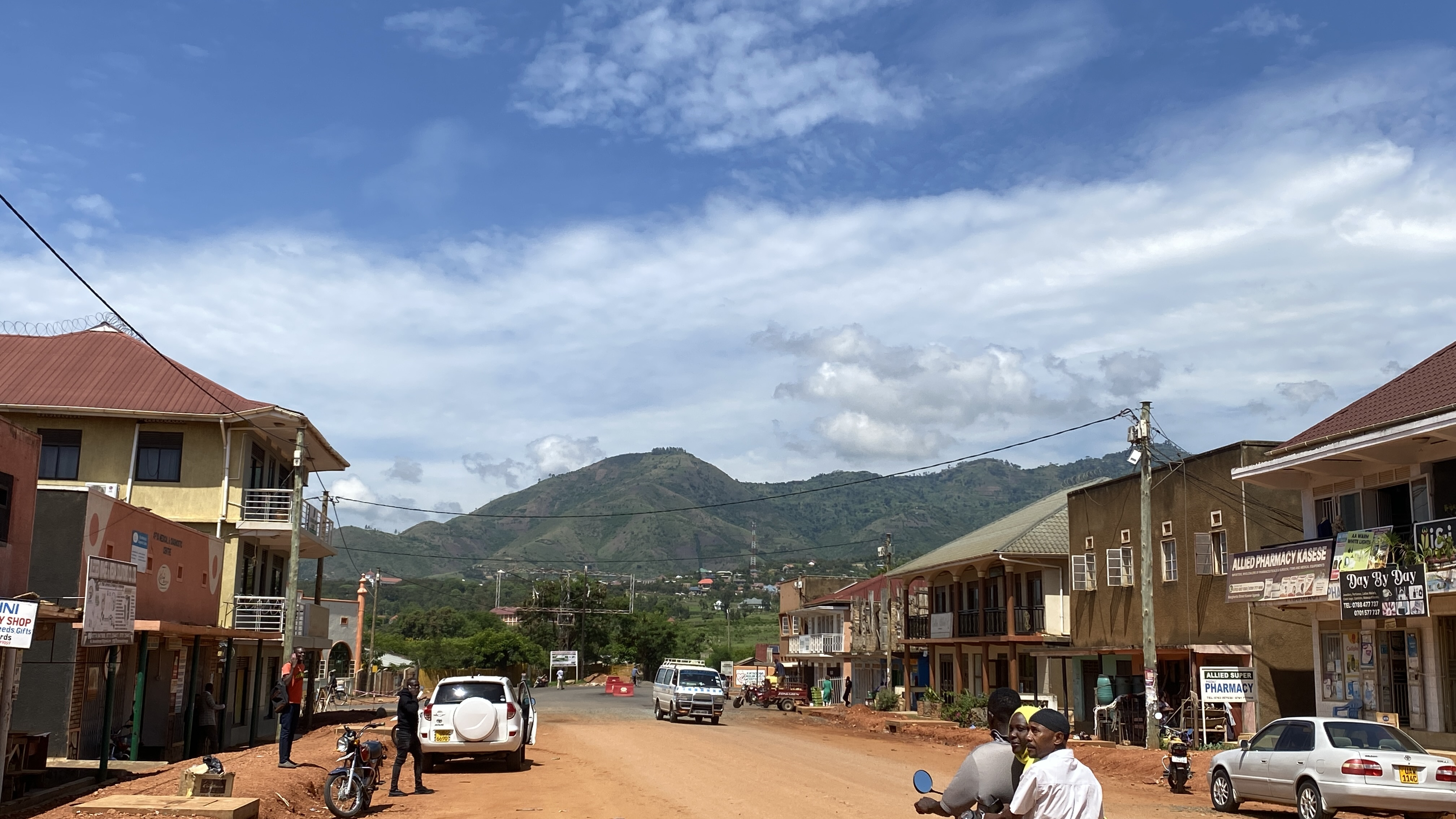
Street view of Kasese town

Kasese is a town in the Western Region of Uganda. It is the capital of Kasese District. Kasese is also the largest town in the Rwenzururu region. At the 2024 census it had an population 133,629. It lies north of Lake George and east of Rwenzori Mountains.

== Location ==
Kasese is located approximately 380 kilometres (240 mi) west from Kampala, Uganda's capital and largest city, 40 kilometres (25 mi) north-east of Mpondwe, a town at the international border between Uganda and the Democratic Republic of the Congo (DRC).

The coordinates of Kasese are 0°11'12.0"N, 30°05'17.0"E (Latitude:0.186667; Longitude:30.088050).

== Climate ==
Climate data for Kasese (1961–1990)
Month	Jan	Feb	Mar	Apr	May	Jun	Jul	Aug	Sep	Oct	Nov	Dec	Year
Mean daily maximum °C (°F)	30.6 (87.1)	31.1 (88.0)	30.8 (87.4)	29.8 (85.6)	29.3 (84.7)	29.6 (85.3)	29.4 (84.9)	29.6 (85.3)	29.8 (85.6)	29.3 (84.7)	28.7 (83.7)	29.0 (84.2)	29.8 (85.5)
Mean daily minimum °C (°F)	16.3 (61.3)	17.0 (62.6)	17.4 (63.3)	17.8 (64.0)	17.4 (63.3)	16.7 (62.1)	16.4 (61.5)	16.9 (62.4)	16.7 (62.1)	16.5 (61.7)	16.8 (62.2)	15.7 (60.3)	16.8 (62.2)
Average rainfall mm (inches)	27.9 (1.10)	37.8 (1.49)	83.9 (3.30)	130.1 (5.12)	100.2 (3.94)	45.8 (1.80)	36.7 (1.44)	67.5 (2.66)	87.9 (3.46)	115.7 (4.56)	104.2 (4.10)	62.3 (2.45)	900 (35.42)
Source: World Meteorological Organization

== Population ==
The national census of 1969 enumerated the population of Kasese Town at 7,213 people. In 1980, the population census that year put the population of the town at 9,917. In 1991, the national census numerated 18,750 inhabitants in Kasese. That population had increased to 85,697 people, according to the 2002 national census. On 27 August 2014, the census and national housing survey enumerated 101,065 people in Kasese Town Council.

In 2020, the Uganda Bureau of Statistics (UBOS), estimated the mid-year population of the town at 115,400 inhabitants. UBOS calculated that the population of Kasese Municipality increased at an average rate of 2.3 percent annually, between 2014 and 2020.

== Population dynamics ==
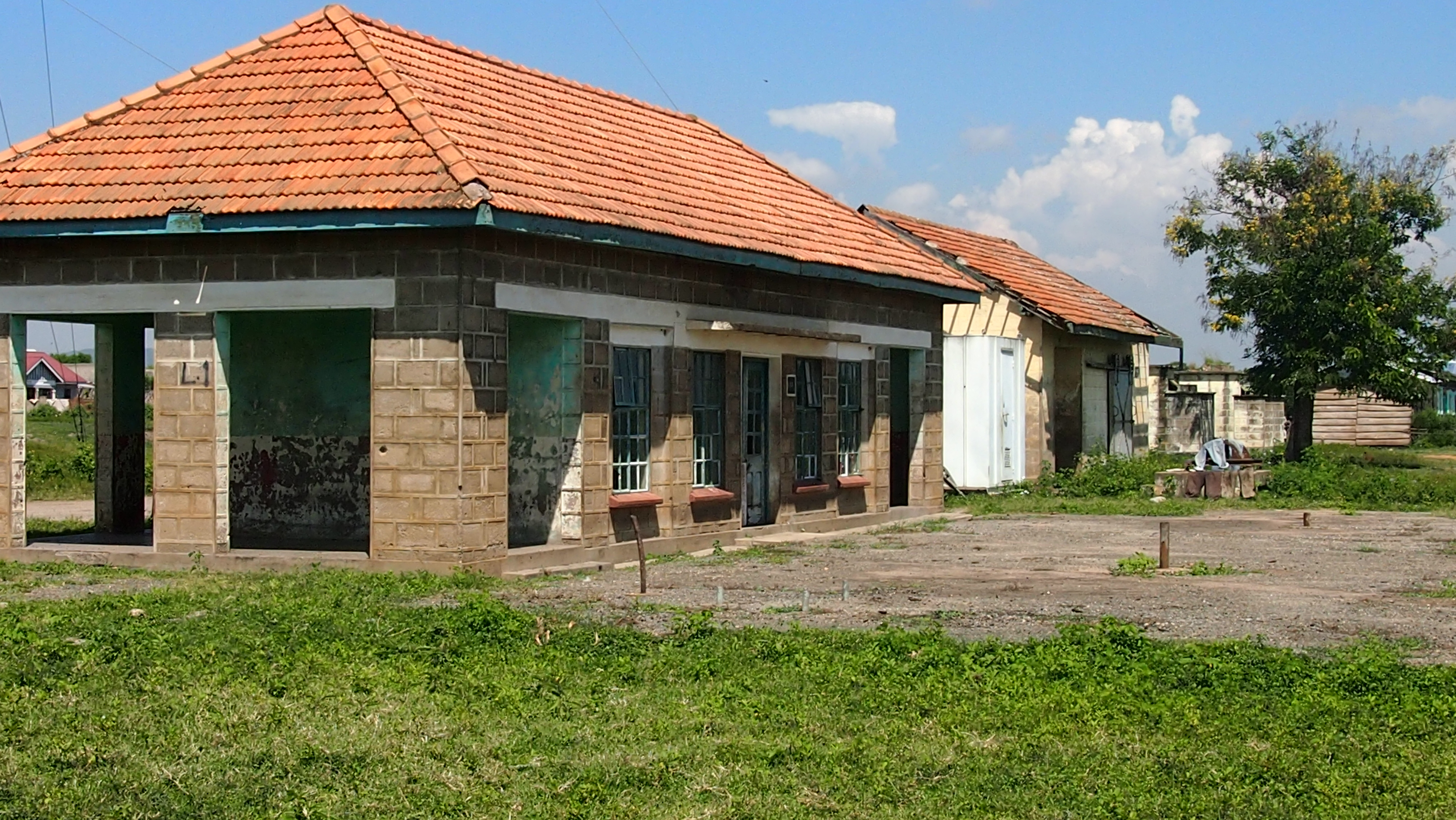
Old Kasese Train Station

Historical population
Year	Pop.	±%
1969	7,213	—
1980	9,917	+37.5%
1991	18,750	+89.1%
2002	85,697	+357.1%
2014	101,065	+17.9%
2020	115,400	+14.2%

During the 1990s Kasese Town was one of the fastest growing municipalities in Uganda. The reasons for this rapid population growth include:

- Increased tourism - Kasese is the gateway to Queen Elizabeth National Park, one of the most popular in Uganda, and the Rwenzori National Park.
- Kilembe Mines employs a large number of workers; over 3,000 as of January 2015.
- Hima Cement Limited is another big employer located in Hima, approximately 24 kilometres (15 mi), by road, north of Kasese.
- Increased trade with the eastern districts of the DRC. The border town of Mpondwe is only 60 kilometres (37 mi) south-west of Kasese.

== Industry ==
Kasese Cobalt Company Limited (KCCL), located on the road from Kasese to Rubirizi just south of the central business district of Kasese, extracts cobalt from the sludge left after copper is extracted from the raw ore.

== Points of interest ==
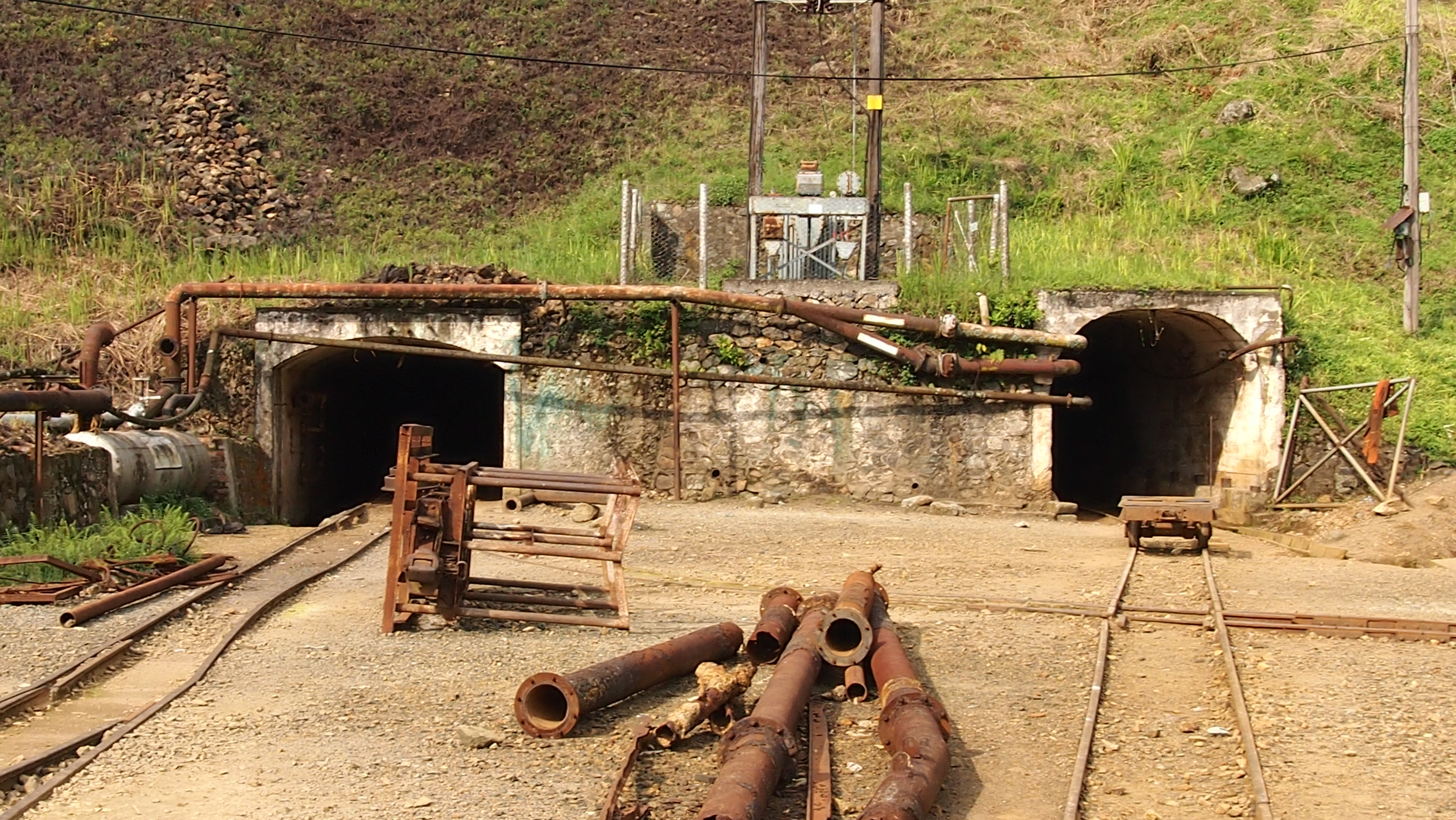
Kilembe Copper Mine

The following points of interest lie within the town or close to its edges:

- Seat of Obusinga Bwa Rwenzururu
- headquarters of Kasese District
- offices of Kasese town council
- Kasese central market
- branch of the National Social Security Fund
- Hima Cement Limited
- Kasese Airport
- Kilembe Cobalt Company Limited
- Kilembe Mines - Extraction of copper. Maintains a private hospital and a 5-megawatt mini-hydropower plant, Mubuku I Power Station, that supplies the town of Kasese.
- Kilembe Mines Hospital - A 200-bed community hospital administered by Kilembe Mines Limited.

== See also ==
- List of cities and towns in Uganda
- Kagando Hospital
- Railway stations in Uganda
