= Kasese District =

- District
- District location in Uganda
- Coordinates: 00°11′N 30°05′E
- Country: Uganda
- Region: Western Uganda
- Sub-region: Rwenzururu sub-region
- Capital: Kasese

Area
  - Total: 2,724 km^{2} (1,052 sq mi)
  - Land: 1,187 km^{2} (458 sq mi)

Population (2012 Estimate)
  - Total: 747,800
- Time zone: UTC+3 (EAT)
- Website: www.kasese.go.ug

Kasese District is a district in Western Uganda. Like most other Ugandan districts, it is named after its chief town and district headquarters, the town of Kasese.

== History ==
In September 2022, the district was hit by deadly landslides.

== Location ==
Kasese District is located along the equator. It is bordered by Kabarole District to the north, Kamwenge District and Kitagwenda District to the east, Rubirizi District to the south, and the Democratic Republic of the Congo to the west. The district headquarters at Kasese are located approximately 359 kilometres (223 mi), by road, west of Kampala, Uganda's capital and largest city.

== Geography ==
The district has a total land area of 2,724 square kilometres (1,052 mi^{2}), of which 885 square kilometres (342 mi^{2}) is reserved for Queen Elizabeth National Park and 652 square kilometres (252 mi^{2}) for Rwenzori Mountains National Park, leaving 1,187 square kilometres (458 mi^{2}) for human habitation and economic utilization. Kasese District is part of the Rwenzururu Kingdom, which is coterminal with the Rwenzururu sub-region, home to an estimated 810,400 inhabitants as f 2022, according to the national census conducted that year. The sub region consists of Bundibugyo District, Ntoroko District, and Kasese District.

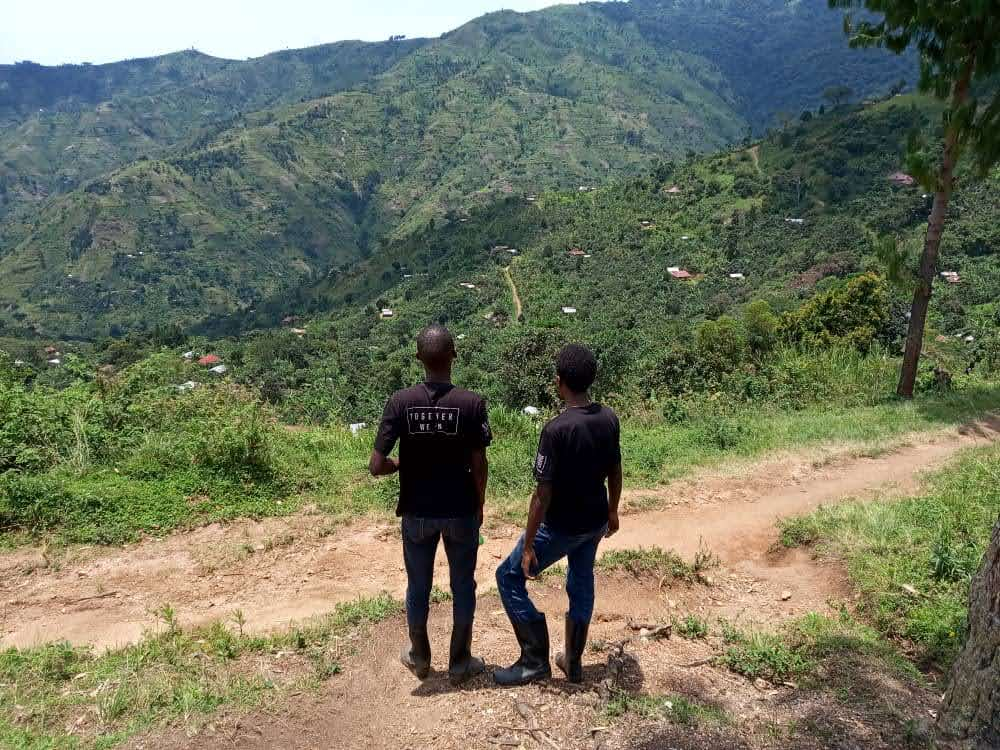
Kasese hills in Uganda

== Population ==
In 1991, the district population was estimated at 343,600. The 2002 national census put the population of the district at approximately 523,000. It is estimated that in 2014, the population of the district was approximately 694,987.

== Ethnicities ==
Kasese is a multi-ethnic district with many people of different ethnic backgrounds. The main languages and ethnic groups that dominate the area are Bakonzo and Basongora Banyabindi, Batooro and Banyankole Bakiga], the languages of the Bakonzo and the Batooro people respectively. However, there are other ethnic groups in the district who include the Banyankole, the Basongora the Bakiga and the Baganda. There is also common usage of English and Swahili.

== Economic activities ==
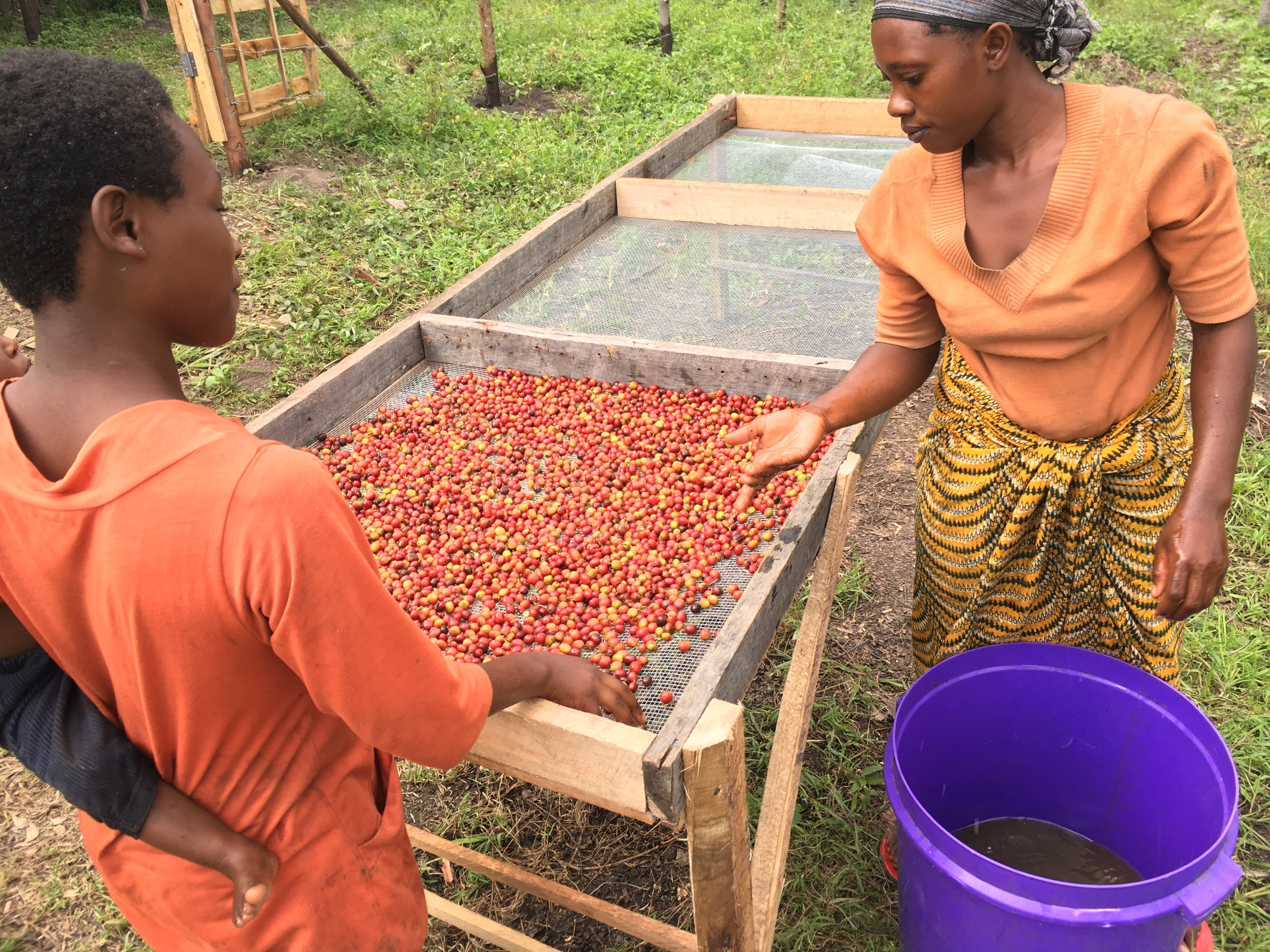
Women drying coffee

Kasese district is mainly agricultural with over 85 percent of the people being peasant farmers who depend on subsistence farming for their livelihood. It has two rainy seasons that come between March and May, and August and November. Temperatures normally range between 23 °C and 30 °C. Crops grown include:

- Millet
- Cassava
- Maize
- Sorghum
- Groundnuts
- Beans
- Irish Potatoes
- Sweet potatoes
- Matooke
- Passion fruit
- Tomatoes
- Cabbage
- Cotton
- Oranges
- Coffee
- Chili peppers
- Mangoes
- Pineapples
- Pears
- Apples
- Sugar cane

Most of the agricultural produce is either sold locally or transported for sale in Kampala and to other cities and towns in Uganda. Fish farming is slowly taking root in the district and demand for the fish is high both locally and in neighboring countries. Livestock kept in the district includes: Cattle, goats, pigs and poultry. Fishing also occurs on Lake George and on smaller crater lakes in the district. There are two main landing sites on the shores of Lake George, Mahyoro and Kayinja.

The district's main border crossing is Mpondwe, where some 25,000 people cross to and from the Democratic Republic of Congo every day.

== See also ==
- Kasese
- Kyondo
- Rwenzururu sub-region
