= Joshua Karamagi =

- Education: Bachelor of Commerce, Makerere University; Master's degree, Edinburgh Business School, Heriot-Watt University
- Occupations: Chartered Financial Analyst,Accountant, Corporate Executive
- Years active: 1990s–present
- Employer: Uganda Electricity Transmission Company Limited(UETCL)
- Known for: Former Chief Executive Officer of Uganda Electricity Transmission Company Limited (UETCL)
- Title: Former Chief Executive Officer
- Successor: Eng. Richard Matsiko

Joshua Karamagi also known as Eng. Joshua K. R. Karamagi is a Ugandan Chartered Financial Analyst (CFA) and former chief executive officer of the Uganda Electricity Transmission Company Limited (UETCL).

== Education background ==
Eng. Karamagi holds a bachelor's degree of commerce from Makerere University and a master's degree from Edinburgh Business School, Heriot-Watt University, United Kingdom.

== Career ==
Eng. Karamagi began his career as an accountant, working with PricewaterhouseCoopers (PwC) as an audit senior before holding a position of financial accountant at Celtel Uganda (now Airtel Uganda) in January 1999.

In January 2002, he joined AfricaOnline as the Chief Accountant before joining Uganda Breweries as Chief Accountant. In 2003, he became the Chief Financial Officer of the National Social Security Fund (NSSF) Uganda a position he held until August 2007 and from August 2007 to November 2010, he served as an Assistant Commissioner at the Ministry of Finance, Planning and Economic Development.

From 2010 to 2014, Eng. Karamagi served as financial director/university bursar of Makerere University and in 2015, he joined the Uganda Electricity Generation Company Limited (UEGCL) as Chief Financial Officer (CFO). In March 2023, Karamagi was appointed chief executive officer of Uganda Electricity Transmission Company Limited (UETCL) a position he held until July 2025.

== Honors and achievements ==
Eng. Karamagi was recognized by Deloitte Uganda and ACCA Uganda as the best-performing Chief Financial Officer in Uganda's public sector in 2018he and was also recognized by readers of CEO East Africa Magazine among Uganda's 100 Leading and Most Admired CEOs for 2024.

== See also ==
- Michael Taremwa Kananura
- Uganda Electricity Generation Company Limited
- Karuma Hydroelectric Power Station
- Isimba Hydroelectric Power Station
