= Paul Mwesigwa =

Ugandan economist, accountant and corporate executive

- Born: Paul Mwesigwa; Uganda
- Education: Makerere University (Bachelor of Economics); Association of Chartered Certified Accountants (Fellow of the Association of Chartered Certified Accountants); Certified Public Accountants of Uganda (Certified Public Accountant); Oxford Brookes University (Master of Business Administration)
- Occupation: Corporate Executive
- Years active: 2000–present
- Title: Managing Director & CEO of UEDCL

Paul Mwesigwa is an economist, accountant and corporate executive in Uganda. He was the managing director and chief executive officer of Uganda Electricity Distribution Company Limited (UEDCL), the largest electric energy distributor and retailer in the country. He has been at the helm of the parastatal company since July 2019, having spent nearly two decades in senior management positions in the same business.

== Background and education ==
He studied at Makerere University, Uganda's oldest and largest public university, graduating with the degree of Bachelor of Economics. He is a Fellow of the Association of Chartered Certified Accountants of the United Kingdom. He is also a certified public accountant of the Institute of Certified Public Accountants of Uganda (ICPAU). His Master of Business Administration (MBA), was obtained from the Oxford Brookes University in the United Kingdom.

== Career ==
His career started around 2000 at the erstwhile Uganda Electricity Board (UEB), before it was unbundled in 2001. Following the partition of UEB into three, he joined Uganda Electricity Distribution Company Limited (UEDCL). From 2001 until 2019, he served in various capacities at UEDCL, including as (a) Chief Financial Officer (b) Chief Risk Officer and (c) Chief Internal Auditor. In July 2019, the board of directors at UEDCL appointed him as managing director and CEO.

Paul Mwesigwa was the substantive CEO at UEDCL on 1 April 2025, when the company took over the work previously carried out by Umeme Limited. At that time, the Uganda government availed UECCDL US$74 million to facilitate the company's work during the first 12 months. Also at the same time, UEDCL absorbed over 2,200 former Umeme employees. Later that same year, with Mwesigwa's leadership, UECDL negotiated an 8 percent per annum loan of US$50 million (about UGX:190 billion) from Absa Bank Uganda Limited, to fund distribution networks in urban areas.

Upon taking over Umeme's activities, Mwesigwa as the CEO of UEDCL is open and transparent about what is needed to achieve the goals that have been set by government. The Uganda government targets 80 percent electrification by 2030 and universal electricity distribution by 2040. Meantime UEDCL plans 300,000 new customer connection between 1 April 2025 and 31 March 2026. As of April 2026, Mwesigwa was leading the electricity distribution utility towards organisational consolitation, infrastructual fortification and profitable management. Under his leadership, UEDCL was navigating a five-year (2026-2030) US$944 million investment plan that includes new customer acquisition, improvement of system resiliance and reliability and the replacement of obsolete, out-of-date equipment with modern technologically appropriate hardware, software and programming.

== See also ==
- Electricity Regulatory Authority
- Uganda Electricity Generation Company Limited
- Uganda Electricity Transmission Company Limited
