= Kawanda–Birembo High Voltage Power Line =

High voltage electricity transmission line in Uganda and Rwanda

Location
- Country: Uganda and Rwanda
- Coordinates: 0.59046°S 30.430200°E
- General direction: North to South
- From: Kawanda, Uganda
- Passes through: Masaka, Mbarara, Mirama Hills
- To: Birembo, Rwanda

Ownership information
- Owner: Government of Uganda & Government of Rwanda
- Partners: African Development Bank
- Operator: Uganda Electricity Transmission Company Limited & Rwanda Energy Group Limited

Construction information
- Contractors: Multiple
- Construction started: 2014
- Expected: 2019

Technical information
- Current type: AC
- Total length: 420 km (260 mi)
- AC voltage: 220kV
- No. of circuits: 2

Kawanda–Birembo High Voltage Power Line is a high voltage electricity power line, under construction, connecting the high voltage substation at Kawanda, in Uganda to another high voltage substation at Birembo, in Rwanda.

== Location ==
The 220 kilovolt power line starts at the Uganda Electricity Transmission Company Limited power station at Kawanda, Wakiso District, in Uganda's Central Region, approximately 15.5 kilometres (10 mi), by road, north of Kampala, the capital and largest city of Uganda. From here, the line travels to the southwestern Ugandan city of Masaka, a straight-line distance of about 121 kilometres (75 mi). From Masaka, the power line continues west to the city of Mbarara, a straight distance of approximately 130 kilometres (81 mi). From Mbarara the power line travels in a general southerly direction to the town of Mirama Hills, a distance of about 66 kilometres (41 mi). From a substation in the Mirama Hills/Kagitumba neighborhood, the power line continues in a southwesterly direction to end at a substation in Birembo, Kinyinya Sector, Gasabo District, Rwanda, in the northern suburbs of Kigali, the capital and largest city of Rwanda, a straight-line distance of about 110 kilometres (68 mi).

== Overview ==
This power transmission line connects the electricity grid of Uganda to that of neighboring Rwanda. It is in line with the Nile Equatorial Lakes Subsidiary Action Program, Interconnection of Electric Grids Project, led by Regional Manager, Grania Rubomboras. The power line was developed in tandem with Karuma Hydroelectric Power Station, whose capacity output of 600MW is expected to be consumed locally and the balance sold regionally, with Rwanda, Burundi and the Democratic Republic of the Congo as potential customers.

== Construction in Uganda ==
The project on the Uganda side is divided into three sections: (a) the Kawanda–Masaka section, measuring about 137 kilometres (85 mi) (b) the Masaka–Mbarara section, measuring about 130 kilometres (81 mi) and (c) the Mbarara–Mirama Hills section, measuring about 66 kilometres (41 mi). The Kawanda–Masaka section was constructed at a budgeted cost of US$153.20 million, of which the World Bank lent US$120 million. Completion was expected in January 2019. However, in July 2018, the Daily Monitor reported that the 220kV line had been commissioned.

The Masaka–Mbarara section was budgeted at €50 million, to be borrowed from the European Union Africa Infrastructure Fund. Work was expected to start in the fourth quarter of 2017 and was expected to conclude in 2019. In March 2018, The Uganda Independent reported that the Ugandan government borrowed €37.1 million from the French Development Agency and another €35 million from the German Development Bank to finance the Masaka-Mbarara section of this transmission line. The Mbarara–Mirama Hills section was completed in 2015.

== Construction in Rwanda ==
The Mirama Hills/Kagitumba–Birembo section measures approximately 100 kilometres (62 mi). The Mbarara–Birembo section measures about 166 kilometres (103 mi). As reported by the EastAfrican in May 2015, this 220kV network already exists. Rwanda is also in the process of building a 220kV substation in Birembo.

== Recent developments ==
At a later date, the entire Kawanda–Birembo High Voltage Power Line is expected to be upgraded to 400kV. In May 2018, the Ugandan government borrowed €37.1 million (about US$44.2 million), from the French Development Agency, to upgrade the 135 kilometres (84 mi), between the cities of Masaka and Mbarara to 400kV. In November 2020, the New Vision newspaper reported that the German Development Bank (KfW) had partially co-funded the upgrade of the Masaka–Mbarara section to 400kV.

In May 2023, it was reported that there was need for a "communications booster" to be installed at the Rwanda Energy Group (REG) electricity sub-station at Shango, Rwanda to communicate effectively with the Uganda Electricity Transmission Company Limited (UETCL) electricity substation in the city of Mbarara in Uganda. It was also reported that procurement and installation of that booster had been concluded in 2023.

The substation at Shango, which is located approximately 13 kilometres (8 mi) north of the Birembo substation, has double circuit bays connecting to the electric grids of Rwanda, Uganda, Tanzania, Burundi and DR Congo. This allows both Rwanda and Uganda who have excess electricity to sell, to trade power between each other and to "wheel" excess power to neighboring countries through Shango.

== See also ==
- Energy in Uganda
- Energy in Rwanda
