= Robert Mukiza =

Director General of the Uganda Investment Authority
- Incumbent
- Assumed office July 2021
- Preceded by: Jolly Kaguhangire

Personal details
- Born: March 1979 (age 47) Kisoro District, Uganda
- Citizenship: Ugandan
- Education: Makerere University; University of Kent; Saïd Business School, University of Oxford
- Occupation: Investment and development professional
- Awards: Excellence in Investment Promotion Award (2024)

Robert Mukiza (born March 1979 ) is a Ugandan investment and development professional who serves as the Director General of the Uganda Investment Authority (UIA).

== Early life and education background ==
Mukiza was born in March 1979 in Kisoro District, western Uganda. He holds a Bachelor of Science in Quantitative Economics from Makerere University, a Master of Science in International Finance and Economic Development from University of Kent and Strategic Leadership Programme from Saïd Business School, University of Oxford.

== Career ==
Before joining the Uganda Investment Authority, Mukiza worked in international development and the private sector. He worked as a researcher at the United Nations Research Institute for Social Development (UNRISD) in Geneva, Switzerland, and also served as Lead Economist for the United Nations Development Programme (UNDP) in the Maldives from December 2006 to December 2007.

He later became the Head of the United Nations Country Team Coordination Unit in Botswana, serving from February 2008 to April 2012. In May 2012, Mukiza became a Director and co-founder of Hong Kong-based Acadia Energy, a position in which he was involved in energy and infrastructure projects in Africa.

He later joined the Global Green Growth Institute (GGGI) as deputy director and Representative to Ethiopia, the African Union and the United Nations Economic Commission for Africa (UNECA), serving from November 2014 to September 2018. In May 2021, Mukiza was appointed as the Director General of the Uganda Investment Authority.

== Awards ==
In September 2024, Mukiza received the Excellence in Investment Promotion Award at the 2024 Consumer Choice Awards.

== See also ==
- Benon Mutambi
- Keith Muhakanizi
- Robert Kasande
- Ramathan Ggoobi
