= Julius Victor Nkeramihigo =

Permanent Secretary for Policy Coordination
- Incumbent
- Assumed office March 2026
- President: Yoweri Museveni

Under Secretary, Ministry of ICT and National Guidance

Principal Administrative Officer, East African Community Secretariat

Personal details
- Citizenship: Ugandan
- Occupation: Government administrator
- Known for: Senior government administration

Julius Victor Nkeramihigo also known as Nkeramihigo Julius Victor is a Ugandan a senior government administrator who serves as the Permanent Secretary responsible for Policy Coordination in the Office of the Prime Minister.

== Career ==
Nkeramihigo began his career in Kamuli District Local Government, where he served as Deputy Chief Administrative Officer and later Acting Chief Administrative Officer before serving as an administrative officer at National Environment Management Authority. He rose through the administrative cadre and eventually became a Principal Assistant Secretary/Principal Administrative Secretary in the Ministry of Public Service.

He also worked as a Principal Administrative Officer at the EAC Secretariat. After returning to Uganda, Nkeramihigo became an Under Secretary in the Ministry of ICT and National Guidance, specifically responsible for Finance and Administration.

In March 2026, President Yoweri Kaguta Museveni appointed Julius Victor Nkeramihigo Permanent Secretary in charge of Policy Coordination across the Public Service.

== See also ==
- Benon Mutambi
- Robert Kasande
- Ramathan Ggoobi
- Geraldine Ssali Busuulwa
