= Kiba Hydroelectric Power Station =

Hydroelectric project in Uganda

- Map of Uganda showing the location of Kiba
- Country: Uganda
- Location: Kiba, Nwoya District
- Coordinates: 02°22′14″N 31°49′58″E
- Status: Proposed
- Owner: Government of Uganda
- Operator: Uganda Electricity Generation Company Limited

Dam and spillways
- Impounds: Victoria Nile

Reservoir
- Normal elevation: 758 m (2,487 ft)

Power Station
- Commission date: TBD (Expected)
- Type: Run-of-the-river
- Installed capacity: 400 MW (540,000 hp)

Kiba Hydroelectric Power Station is a planned 400 megawatts (540,000 hp) hydroelectric power station in Uganda.

== Location ==
The power station would be located on the Nile River, downstream of Karuma Hydroelectric Power Station, but upstream of Murchison Falls. This location is in Nwoya District, in the Northern Region of Uganda, approximately 35 kilometres (22 mi), upstream of the boundary of Murchison Falls National Park. Kiba is approximately 758 metres (2,487 ft), above sea level, and marks the point where the Kiba River enters the Nile.

== Overview ==
The government of Uganda commissioned a study, titled Project for Master Plan Study on Hydropower Development in the Republic of Uganda, that was conducted by Electric Power Development Company Limited and Nippon Koei Company Limited, which was funded by the Japan International Cooperation Agency (JICA), in 2009. In the report of that study, published in 2011, three large hydroelectric power stations were identified for immediate development, in the 2013 to 2023 time-frame, namely Isimba Hydroelectric Power Station, Karuma Hydroelectric Power Station and Ayago Hydroelectric Power Station. Two other stations were identified for development in the medium term, after the first three, namely Oriang Hydroelectric Power Station (400 megawatts), and Kiba Power Station (initially 200 megawatts).

== Project development ==
On 27 May 2015 the government of Uganda signed a Memorandum of Understanding (MoU) with China Africa Investment and Development Company (CAIDC), calling for a detailed feasibility study that would lead to a Build, Own, Operate and Transfer (BOOT) agreement for the Kiba Hydroelectric Power Project and the associated transmission line works. In July 2017, more than two years from the MoU, with no tangible progress, the Uganda Ministry of Energy and Mineral Development terminated the MoU. If this dam is to be built, a new investor will have to be sourced. In May 2024, PowerChina, through its subsidiary Sinohydro, indicated willingness to work with the government of Uganda to develop this power station.

In May 2026, Ruth Nankabirwa, Uganda's Energy minister, commissioned a feasibility study to inform the construction of this renewable energy infrastructure project. The selected consultancy is expected to work in collaboration with various government agencies to fast-track the study, leading to selection of contractor, funding sources and start of construction.

== Other considerations ==
The JICA report outlined a possible phased approach, where the power station was to be built over a number of years and commissioned in phases, to conserve resources and avoid building over-capacity.

== See also ==
- Oriang Hydroelectric Power Station
- Ayago Hydroelectric Power Station
- Isimba Hydroelectric Power Station
- Karuma Hydroelectric Power Station
