= Oriang Hydroelectric Power Station =

- Map of Uganda showing the location of Oriang
- Country: Uganda
- Location: Oriang, Nwoya District
- Coordinates: 02°16′00″N 32°05′00″E
- Status: Proposed
- Owner: Government of Uganda
- Operator: Uganda Electricity Generation Company Limited

Dam and spillways
- Impounds: Victoria Nile

Reservoir
- Normal elevation: 923 m (3,028 ft)

Power Station
- Commission date: TBD (Expected)
- Type: Run-of-the-river
- Installed capacity: 400 MW (540,000 hp)

Oriang Hydroelectric Power Station is a proposed 400 megawatts (540,000 hp) hydroelectric power station in the Northern Region of Uganda.

== Location ==
The power station would be located on the Nile River, downstream of Karuma Hydroelectric Power Station, but upstream of Murchison Falls. This location is in Nwoya District, in the Northern Region of Uganda, close to the location where Oriang Stream enters the Victoria Nile. Oriang is approximately 923 metres (3,028 ft), above sea level.

== Overview ==
In 2009, the government of Uganda commissioned a study, titled Project for Master Plan Study on Hydropower Development in the Republic of Uganda, that was conducted by Electric Power Development Company Limited and Nippon Koei Company Limited, and was funded by the Japan International Cooperation Agency (JICA). In the report of that study, published in 2011, three large hydroelectric power stations were identified for immediate development, in the 2013 to 2023 time-frame, namely Isimba Hydroelectric Power Station, Karuma Hydroelectric Power Station and Ayago Hydroelectric Power Station. Two other stations were identified for development in the medium term, after the first three, namely Oriang Power Station (400 megawatts), and Kiba Power Station (now 400 megawatts).

== Timetable ==
The development of Oriang Power Station is in progress. In 2013, The EastAfrican newspaper reported that this power station was in the process of being prepared for tendering. Construction is anticipated to begin in 2020, and last approximately five years.

== Other considerations ==
The JICA report outlined a possible phased approach, where the power station is built over a number of years and commissioned in phases, to conserve resources and avoid building over-capacity.

== See also ==
- Ayago Hydroelectric Power Station
- Kiba Hydroelectric Power Station
- Isimba Hydroelectric Power Station
- Karuma Hydroelectric Power Station
