= Uganda National Meteorological Authority =

Agency overview
- Formed: 2012; 14 years ago
- Jurisdiction: Government of Uganda
- Headquarters: Kampala, Uganda
- Agency executives: Chairman, Executive Director, Festus Luboyera
- Website: www.unma.go.ug

The Uganda National Meteorological Authority (UNMA) is a semi-autonomous government agency mandated to offer weather and climate services, and to analyze scientific research findings and provide guidance on climate change.

== Location ==
UNMA maintains its headquarters at 21/28 Port Bell Road, in the neighborhood of Luzira, in the Nakawa Division of Kampala, Uganda's capital city. This is about 9.5 kilometres (6 mi), by road, southeast of the city center. The coordinates of the agency's headquarters are 0°17'56.0"N, 32°38'56.0"E (Latitude:0.298889; Longitude:32.648889).

== Overview ==
Established in 2012 by Act of parliament, UNMA was formerly the "Department of Meteorology". It is administered under the Ugandan Ministry of Water and Environment.

The agency, in concert with the World Meteorological Organisation Convention, provides services related to meteorology and hydrology, while monitoring weather and climate.

The Authority fulfills a number of national requirements, including (a) protect life and property (b) safeguard the environment (c) collect, record, store and disseminate climatological, meteorological, hydrological and environmental data and (d) meet international commitments and obligations. The consumers of the data collected include (1) the Uganda Civil Aviation Authority, for dissemination to flight crews using Ugandan airspace (2) the relevant Ugandan Ministries including that of Agriculture, Animal Industry and Fisheries and (c) the public, to enable those interested to plan better.

In July 2019, the agency began providing weather forecasts for Lake Victoria, 43 percent of which lies in Uganda. The forecasts provided every 12 hours, are targeted towards fishing boats, small crafts, and communities around the lake.

== See also ==
- URA House
- Economy of Uganda
- Ministry of Finance, Planning and Economic Development (Uganda)
