= Power Construction Corporation of China =

Chinese state-owned enterprise

- Trade name: PowerChina
- Native name: 中国电力建设集团有限公司
- Company type: State-owned enterprise
- Traded as: SSE: 601669; CSI A100
- Industry: Heavy & Civil Engineering Construction Industry
- Founded: 2009
- Headquarters: Haidian, Beijing, China
- Area served: Worldwide
- Key people: Yan Zhiyong
- Services: Power construction
- Revenue: US$ 97.0 billion (2023)
- Net income: US$ 776 million (2023)
- Total assets: US$ 198.7 billion (2023)
- Owner: State Council of China (100%)
- Number of employees: 184,567 (2023)
- Subsidiaries: 779 companies including Sinohydro, HDEC, SEPCO and SEPCO3
- Website: en.powerchina.cn

Power Construction Corporation of China (PowerChina) is a wholly state-owned enterprise under the SASAC of the State Council. The company is active in the heavy and civil engineering construction industry and is involved in infrastructure, energy, and hydropower development projects worldwide.

== Subsidiaries ==
PowerChina operates nearly 800 subsidiaries including:

- Sinohydro
- HydroChina
- HDEC
- SEPCO
- SEPCO III

== Global Projects ==
- HydroChina Dawood Wind Power Project, Pakistan
- Nam Ou river cascade dams, Laos
- Dau Tieng Solar Power Project, Vietnam
- Melaka Gateway, Malaysia
- Lamu Coal Power Station, Kenya
- Ayago Hydroelectric Power Station, Uganda
- Kiba Hydroelectric Power Station, Uganda
- Karuma Hydroelectric Power Station, Uganda
- Merowe Dam, Sudan
- Pwalugu Hydroelectric Power Station, Ghana
- Pakistan Port Qasim Power Project
- Zambia–Zimbabwe thermal power plant
- Highway 2 upgrade, Israel
- Coca Codo Sinclair Dam, Ecuador

== Domestic Projects ==
- Three Gorges Project
- Zouxian Power Station
- Longyuan Rudong Intertidal Wind Farm
- Beijing–Shanghai high-speed railway
- Shenzhen Metro Line 12

== Future Projects ==
In November 2020, chairman Yan Zhiyong announced plans for the construction of a "super dam" on the Yarlung Zangbo river. This proposed project would exceed the scale of the current Three Gorges Dam, already the largest hydroelectric facility in the world.

== See also ==
- List of companies of China
- List of largest Chinese companies
