= Harrison Mutikanga =

Ugandan civil engineer and academic

- Born: 1968 (age 57–58); Kilembe, Kasese District; Uganda
- Citizenship: Uganda
- Education: Makerere University (Bachelor of Science in civil engineering); University in the Netherlands (Master of Science in civil engineering) (Doctor of philosophy in civil engineering)
- Occupations: Civil engineer, business executive, and academic
- Years active: 1996–present
- Title: Executive director Uganda Electricity Generation Company Limited

Harrison E. Mutikanga is a Ugandan civil engineer, business executive, and academic in Uganda. He is the managing director and the chief executive officer of the Uganda Electricity Generation Company Limited.

== Background and education ==
Mutikanga was born in 1968 to the late George William Rwimo and Joselyne Mary Rwimo of Nyakabingo in Kisoro district, in Kilembe, Kasese District, where George was employed at the time. Mutikanga was the second-born, in a family of five boys and one girl.

He first attended Bulembeya Primary School in Kilembe, but while in grade 2, his father developed medical problems and the family relocated to Kisoro District. In Kisoro, he moved around in several elementary schools. He finished his primary schooling from grade 4 to grade 7 at Kabindi primary school.

He attended Mutolere Secondary School in Mutolere, Kisoro for his O-Level studies. He transferred to Makerere College School for his A-Level education, where he studied physics, chemistry, and mathematics. He was admitted to Makerere University to study civil engineering, graduating with a Bachelor of Science in civil engineering. He later earned, from a university in the Netherlands, both a Master of Science and a Doctor of Philosophy in civil engineering.

== Career ==
When Mutikanga left Makerere, he worked for the National Water and Sewerage Corporation (NWSC) and was posted to Jinja as area manager. He worked for NWSC for 20 years, when an advertisement for UEGCL's chief executive officer appeared in a newspaper. He applied and was selected as the best out of 23 applicants.

At UEGCL, he oversees generation of electricity at the two government-owned power stations of Nalubaale and Kiira. He is also responsible for overseeing the construction of the 183 megawatt Isimba Hydroelectric Power Station and the 600 megawatt Karuma Hydroelectric Power Station.

== Other responsibilities ==
Mutikanga is a married father of four children.

He formerly worked as a part-time lecturer at Uganda Christian University in Mukono.

He is a member of the Engineers Registration Board of Uganda. He is a board member of Malaria Free Uganda, a public private initiative by the government of Uganda under Ministry of Health charged with creating an enabling environment for private sector participation and stakeholder engagement in Malaria elimination in Uganda by 2030.
