= Gudula Naiga Basaza =

Ugandan entrepreneur and business executive

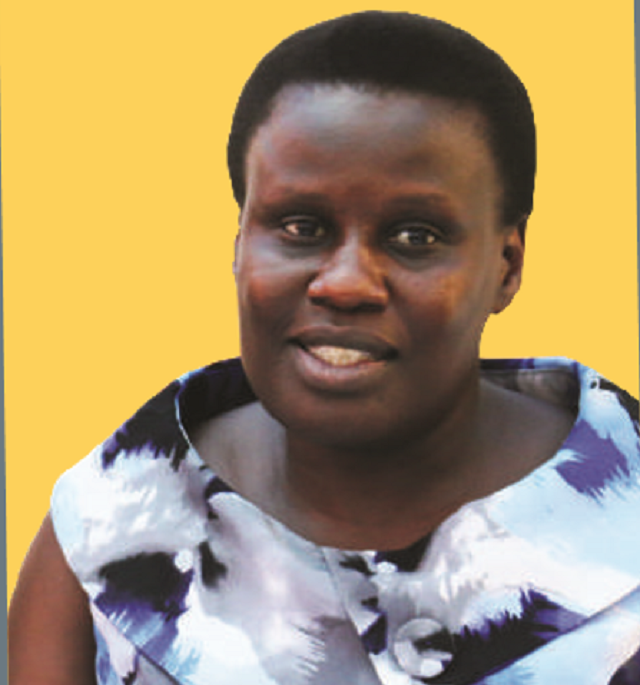
- Born: Buganda region, Kampala, Uganda
- Citizenship: Uganda
- Education: The George Washington University, USA (2009–2010) Makerere University, Uganda bachelor's degree in botany and zoology (1992) Postgraduate diploma in education Makerere University, Uganda 1993 University of York, England, master's degree in education 1998 University of Ghent, Belgium, PhD in ICT 2006
- Occupations: Business Woman and Entrepreneur
- Organization(s): Cofounder and managing director at Gudie leisure farm
- Board member of: Chairs the board of trustee of Kampala City Traders Association.
- Spouse: Dr. Robert Basaza
- Awards: Chairperson of Uganda Women Entrepreneur's Association Limited. Dfcu women advisory council. Gudula is also the president East African Women Entrepreneurs Exchange Network.  Uganda Development Bank (UDB), in 2007 awarded Gudula's farm as the top winner The 2019 Hi Pipo awards among the 50 most influential women in Uganda

Gudula Naiga Basaza is a Ugandan businesswoman, entrepreneur and also the co-founder and managing director at Gudie leisure farm located in Najjera, Kira town council. The farm has a variety of leisure activities for each category of visitors. Among the activities is sport fishing, relaxing walkways which has enhanced physical fitness among the visitors.

== Background and education ==
Gudula was born in Buganda region, Kampala, Uganda, married to Dr. Robert Basaza of Makerere Medical School who also doubles as the co-director at the Gudie leisure farm. Gudula was a Fulbright scholar at The George Washington University, USA (2009–2010) for a year. She studied at Makerere University, Uganda and was awarded a bachelor's degree in botany and zoology (1992) then in 1993 she also obtained a postgraduate diploma in education from the same university and in 1998 joined University of York, England, where she obtained a master's degree in education and in 2006 went through University of Ghent, Belgium, where she was awarded with a PhD in ICT.

== Career ==
Gudula started Gudie leisure farm on 14 January 2009 with the primary objective of creating employment opportunities and also building skills for young people who normally risk their lives into crime due to high costs of living and yet they nothing to offer. The farm is also serving about 20,280 small holder farmers with a purpose of transforming them into commercial farmers with a target of reaching 200,000 by 2026.

Gudie leisure farm is currently affiliated with over 25 workers where each worker works for a maximum of three years and is able to start up his or her own business due to multiple skills and knowledge gained while working with the farm.

Since 2009, Gudula has ventured in leisure activities like sport fishing, walkways, rides on donkey backs and in carts. Among other activities on the farm is an educative campsite which deals with fish farming, poultry, piggery and horticulture with a target of supplying 13.5 tonnes of fish per week and 500 broilers per day.

Besides farming, Gudula was also recently employed as the vice chancellor and development officer at St. Joseph International university and St. Augustine International university, Uganda. she was also previously at Uganda Martyrs University Nkozi as the Director for center for distance learning studies and lecturer, educational technology

== Achievements ==
Due to her daily endeavors, perseverance and mentor ship, Gudula was elected as the chairperson of Uganda Women Entrepreneur's Association Limited. She is also a member of the Dfcu women advisory council. Gudula is also the president East African Women Entrepreneurs Exchange Network. She also chairs the board of trustee of Kampala City Traders Association.

In 2017, Uganda Development Bank (UDB), through its initiative to support innovations and start up enterprises, recognized and awarded Gudula's farm as the top winner in that aspect and thus the farm received UGX25 million.

She was also recognized during the 2019 Hi Pipo awards among the 50 most influential women in Uganda especially in the business sector.

== See also ==
- Fish farming in Uganda
- Agribusiness in Uganda
