= Grania Rubomboras =

Ugandan electrical engineer and corporate executive

- Born: Uganda
- Education: Makerere University (BS, E.E.); Makerere University, Faculty of Management (MBA); Boston University (MS, Project Management)
- Occupations: Engineer; corporate executive
- Years active: 1978–present
- Title: Chairperson Electricity Regulatory Authority

Grania Rosette Makatu Rubomboras (née Grania Makatu) is a Ugandan electrical engineer and corporate executive. Effective 25 October 2025, she is the chairperson of the Electricity Regulatory Authority (ERA) of Uganda. She replaced Sarah Wasagali Kanaabi, who joined Uganda's elective politics. Previously, she was the Programme Officer, Power Project of the Nile Equatorial Lakes Subsidiary Action Program, based in Kigali, Rwanda, where she heads the Power Development and Trade Department.

== Background and education ==
She was born in Uganda and attended local schools for her primary education. She attended Gayaza High School, specializing in Physics, Chemistry and Mathematics. She studied engineering at Makerere University, graduating with a Bachelor of Science in electrical engineering in 1978. Later, she obtained a Master of Business Administration, from Makerere University, Faculty of Management. She also holds a Master of Science in Project Management, awarded by Boston University.

== Career ==
After a period of absence from Uganda, Rubomboras joined the now defunct "Uganda Electricity Board" in 1992. She rose through the ranks to the position of Managing Director, by 2003. When UEB was dissolved in 2004, Rubomboras spent several years as a Manager Project Planning at the "Rural Electrification Agency, where she was Heading the Planning Department".

In her role as regional project manager of the Nile Equatorial Lakes Subsidiary Action Program, Interconnection of Electric Grids Project, and after as head of the Power Development and Trade department. Her department is responsible for five main initiatives: 1. The interconnection of the electricity grids of Burundi, the Democratic Republic of the Congo, Kenya, Rwanda and Uganda. 2. The development of Rusumo Hydroelectric Power Station 3. Feasibility studies to assess the proposed interconnection of the Tanzanian grid to that of Zambia. 4. Development of interconnection between the electricity grids of Uganda and the Democratic Republic of the Congo and 5. Development of the Uganda - South Sudan electricity interconnection.

== Personal life ==
Rubomboras is a mother of two – a daughter named Emily and a son named Albert.

== Other considerations ==
In May 2017, Rubomboras was recognized for her work in integrating the national electricity grid networks of five member-countries of the Nile Basin Initiative, namely: Burundi, Democratic Republic of Congo, Kenya, Rwanda and Uganda. The recognition was at the annual "African Utility Week Power Industry Awards" held in Cape Town, South Africa, on 17 May 2017.

== See also ==
- Uganda Electricity Generation Company Limited
