= Karuma–Kawanda High Voltage Power Line =

Electric power line in Uganda

Location
- Country: Uganda
- Coordinates: 0.864722°N 32.490000°E
- General direction: North to South
- From: Karuma, Uganda
- Passes through: Kigumba, Nakasongola; Luweero, Matugga
- To: Kawanda, Uganda

Ownership information
- Owner: Government of Uganda
- Partners: Exim Bank of China
- Operator: Uganda Electricity Transmission Company Limited

Construction information
- Contractors: Sinohydro Corporation Limited
- Construction started: 2015
- Expected: 2018

Technical information
- Current type: AC
- Total length: 264 km (164 mi)
- AC voltage: 400kV
- No. of circuits: 2

The Karuma–Kawanda High Voltage Power Line is a high voltage electricity power line, under construction, connecting the high voltage substation at Karuma Hydroelectric Power Station, in the Western Region of Uganda, to another high voltage substation at Kawanda, in the Central Region of Uganda.

== Location ==
The 400 kilo Volt power line starts at the 400kV substation a Karuma Hydroelectric Power Station, Kiryandongo District, in Uganda's Western Region, approximately 260 kilometres (162 mi), by road, north of Kampala, the capital and largest city in the country. The power line travels in a general south-easterly direction to end at another 440kV substation owned by Uganda Electricity Transmission Company Limited (UETCL), located at Kawanda, in Wakiso District, a total distance of about 264 kilometres (164 mi).

== Overview ==
The power line is being developed in tandem with the 600 MW Karuma Hydroelectric Power Station, whose output is expected to be consumed locally and the balance sold regionally, with Burundi, Rwanda and DR Congo as potential customers. This power line is planned to evacuate the power from Karuma to Kawanda, where it can be distributed to the regional customers.

== Associated power lines ==
Two other high voltage power lines are under construction to evacuate power from Karuma: (a) The 60 kilometres (37 mi), 400kV Karuma–Olwiyo High Voltage Power Line, connects Karuma Power Station to a substation in Olwiyo, Nwoya District, for onward transmission to Pakwach, Nebbi, Paidha, Arua, Koboko, Yumbe and Moyo. and (b) The 80 kilometres (50 mi) 132 kV Karuma–Lira High Voltage Power Line, which connects Karuma to Lira.

== Construction ==
Sinohydro Corporation Limited, the main contractor for the construction of Karuma Power Station is the contractor on this project. The supervising engineering company is "Intec Gopa International Energy Consultants". The budgeted cost of construction, including the cost of the other two energy evacuation lines from Karuma is approximately US$290 million. Funding was obtained from the Exim Bank of China. Construction began in 2015, with commercial commissioning expected in 2018.

In March 2020, the Daily Monitor reported that, as of that date, 617 steel high voltage towers had been completed, out of a total of 639 needed to complete the line. That left 22 towers to completion, including 5 in Wakiso District, 4 in Luweero District, 2 in Nakasongola District and 11 in Kiryandongo District. Therefore, at that time, the line was 96.5 percent complete, with 3.5 percent uncompleted. Commissioning of the transmission line is scheduled for June 2020.

== See also ==
- Energy in Uganda
- List of power stations in Uganda
