= Electricity Regulatory Authority House =

Building in Uganda

- Location within Kampala Electricity Regulatory Authority House (Uganda) Electricity Regulatory Authority House (Africa)

General information
- Type: Commercial
- Location: 5C1 Third Street; Industrial Area; Kampala, Uganda
- Coordinates: 00°19′18″N 32°36′18″E
- Construction started: 29 June 2018
- Completed: 30 September 2021
- Cost: Shs26.7 billion (US$7.6 million)

Technical details
- Floor count: 6

Design and construction
- Main contractor: ROKO Construction Company

Electricity Regulatory Authority House, also New ERA House, is a commercial office building constructed between June 2018 and September 2021, in Kampala, the capital of Uganda, and the largest city in that country. The building serves as the headquarters of Electricity Regulatory Authority, (ERA), the Uganda government agency responsible for the regulation, licensing, and supervision of the generation, transmission, distribution, sale, export, and importation of electricity in that country.

== Location ==
The skyscraper is located at 5C1 Third Street, in the Industrial Area of Kampala, Uganda's capital. This is approximately 3 kilometres (2 mi) east of the central business district of Kampala, City.

== Overview ==
Under construction since June 2018, the office complex consists of a six storied office tower, underground parking, perimeter fencing, courtyard, gate houses and gates as well as paved ground-level parking.

New ERA House is a "smart, green building", with elevator surveillance, monitored energy usage and natural air conditioning. The office building can accommodate 120 workers, and includes a kitchen, gymnasium and breastfeeding parlor. Other intelligent and conservation features include electronic entry and exit doors, bicycle parking racks and two stand-by solar systems. The building also has a cafeteria and a 133-seater conference theater.

== Construction ==
The budgeted cost of construction was USh34.4 billion (approx. US$9.8 million), according to Ziria Tibalwa Waako, the Chief Executive Officer of ERA, as quoted by the Daily Monitor. However, actual construction expenditure was USh26.7 billion (approx. US$7.6 million), with savings of USh7.6 billion (approx. US$2.2 million).

ROKO Construction Company, a Ugandan engineering and construction firm, was awarded the engineering, procurement and construction contract. Archtech Consults (Uganda) Limited, a Ugandan consulting engineering company was appointed as Owner's Engineer. The government of Uganda funded the construction of the building.

== See also ==
- List of tallest buildings in Kampala
- Kampala Central Division
- URA House
- Energy in Uganda
