= King Ceasor University =

Private university in Uganda

- Former names: St. Augustine International University
- Motto: Veritas
- Type: Private
- Established: 2011
- Chairperson: Hon. Dr. Chris Baryomunsi
- Chancellor: King Ceasor Augustus Mulenga
- Vice-Chancellor: Dr. Charity Basaza Mulenga
- Location: Kampala, Uganda; 00°16′20″N 32°37′17″E
- Campus: Urban
- Website: Homepage
- Location in Kampala

King Ceasor University is a private, chartered university previously known as St. Augustine International University.

== Location ==
King Ceasor University is a multi-campus university. It maintains the following campuses:

Bunga Campus

The main campus is located in the neighborhood of Bunga, in Makindye Division, one of the five administrative divisions of Uganda's capital city, Kampala. This location lies approximately 8 kilometres (5.0 mi), by road, southeast of the city's central business district. The approximate coordinates of the main campus of King Ceasor University are:0°16'21.0"N, 32°37'19.0"E (Latitude:0.272500; Longitude:32.621944).

Kisoro Campus

The Kisoro campus is located in the southwestern Ugandan town of Kisoro, approximately 465 kilometres (289 mi), by road, southwest of Kampala. The campus is close to Saint Francis Hospital Mutolere, in Mutolere, which will serve as one of the teaching hospitals of the university.

Mulago Campus

The Mulago campus is located on Mulago Hill, in Kawempe Division, in northern Kampala, approximately 5 kilometres (3.1 mi), by road, north of the city's central business district. This location is adjacent to Mulago National Referral Hospital, another teaching hospital of the university.

Namugongo Campus

The Namugongo campus is located at Namugongo, Kira Town, Wakiso District, approximately 15 kilometres (9.3 mi), by road, northeast of downtown Kampala. The location lies close to the shrines of the Uganda Martyrs, with streams flowing through the campus. The College of Agriculture and Veterinary Medicine will be based here.

== Overview ==
King Ceasor University (KCU) is one of the private, cosmopolitan universities in Uganda established in 2011 with international students from Tanzania, Nigeria, Palestine, India, Rwanda, Malawi, Ethiopia, and South Sudan.

It is accredited by the Uganda National Council for Higher Education, the national body that licenses institutions of higher education in the country. The multi-campus university is one of a number of private universities accredited between 2010 and 2014. The founding vice chancellor of the university is Charity Basaza Mulenga, an electrical and computer science engineer trained at Makerere University in Uganda and Loughborough University in the United Kingdom.

== Academic departments ==
King Ceasor University Schools and programs:

1. School of Medicine, Health & Life Sciences
2. School of Law and Management Sciences
3. School of Science, Engineering & Computing

== Academic courses ==
Listed below, are some of the undergraduate courses on offer, as of December 2020.

- Bachelor of Medicine & Bachelor of Surgery
- Bachelor of Medical Records & Health Informatics
- Bachelor of Nursing Science
- Diploma in Clinical Medicine and Community Health
- Bachelor of Laws
- Bachelor of Business Administration
- Bachelor of Oil, Gas and Energy Management
- Diploma in Medical Laboratory Technology
- BSc in Oil And Gas Management
- Bachelor of Science in Petroleum Geoscience
- Bachelor of Computer Forensics & Criminal Investigations
- Higher Education Certificate

== See also ==
- Ggaba
- Kansanga
- Education in Uganda
- List of universities in Uganda
- List of university leaders in Uganda
