= Benon Mutambi =

Ugandan economist and civil servant (born 1969)

- Born: 1969 (age 56–57); Uganda
- Citizenship: Ugandan
- Education: Makerere University (BSc in Economics & Statistics) (PhD in Economics); University of Zimbabwe (MSc in Economics)
- Occupation: Economist
- Years active: 1995 — present
- Known for: Transparency and credibility
- Title: Permanent Secretary in the Uganda Ministry of Internal Affairs

Benon Mugisha Mutambi is a Ugandan economist and civil servant, who has served as the permanent secretary in the Uganda Ministry of Internal Affairs, since December 2016. Prior to his appointment to the interior ministry, he served as the chief executive officer of Electricity Regulatory Authority (ERA), the government agency responsible for the regulation of electricity tariffs in Uganda.

== Background and education ==
He studied at Makerere University, graduating with a Bachelor of Science in economics and statistics. His Master of Science in economics was obtained from the University of Zimbabwe. He also holds a Doctor of Philosophy in economics, which was awarded by Makerere University.

== Career ==
He previously taught Economics and Statistics at university level in Uganda. For a period of nine years he worked in the Bank of Uganda, "in the areas of monetary policy, external sector policies, and regional integration". He joined ERA in 2004.

From 2004 until 2011, he worked as the director of economic regulation at ERA. In 2011, he was appointed chief executive officer of the Electricity Regulatory Authority (ERA) in Uganda.

In December 2016, Dr. Mutambi was named permanent secretary in Uganda's Internal Affairs Ministry, and was replaced at the Electricity Regulatory Authority by Engineer Ziria Tibalwa Waako.

== Other responsibilities ==
Dr. Benon M Mutambi is married.

== See also ==
- Umeme
- UEGCL
- UETCL
- UEDCL
