= Paul Waako =

Ugandan physician and academic administrator

- Born: 20 February 1967 (age 59); Mukuta Village, Mayuge District, Uganda
- Education: Makerere University (Bachelor of Medicine and Bachelor of Surgery) (Master of Science in Pharmacology) University of Cape Town (Doctor of Philosophy in Clinical Pharmacology); Uganda Management Institute (Postgraduate Diploma in Management)
- Occupation: Vice chancellor of Busitema University

Paul Waako (born 20 February 1967) is a Ugandan pharmacologist, academic and academic administrator, who has served as the vice chancellor of Busitema University, a public university in the Eastern Region of Uganda since 1 May 2019.

== Background and education ==
Waako was born on 20 February 1967 at Mukuta Village, in Mayuge District, in the Eastern Region of Uganda. After attending local primary and secondary schools, he was admitted to Makerere University School of Medicine, the oldest medical school in East Africa.

He holds a Bachelor of Medicine and Bachelor of Surgery degree and a Master of Science degree in Pharmacology, both awarded by Makerere University in Uganda. His Doctor of Philosophy in Clinical Pharmacology was obtained from the University of Cape Town in South Africa. He also holds a Postgraduate Diploma in Management, obtained from the Uganda Management Institute in Kampala.

== Career ==
For ten years, Waako chaired the Department of Pharmacology and Therapeutics at Makerere University College of Health Sciences (MUCHS). He was then appointed dean of Busitema University Faculty of Health Sciences (BUFHS), and served in that capacity from 2013 until 2019.

As vice chancellor at Busitema University, he succeeded Professor Mary Okwakol, the founding vice chancellor, whose term of office ended on 30 April 2019.

== Family ==
Waako is married to Ziria Tibalwa Waako, an electrical engineer, who has served as the chief executive officer of Uganda's Electricity Regulatory Authority since November 2016. Together, they are parents to five children.
