= Mutolere =

Ugandan settlement

- Location in Uganda; Placement on map is approximate
- Coordinates: 1°15′35″S 29°43′00″E
- Country: Uganda
- Region: Western Uganda
- District: Kisoro District
- Municipality: Kisoro
- Elevation: 5,981 ft (1,823 m)

Mutolere is a neighborhood in Kisoro Municipality, Kisoro District, in the Western Region of Uganda.

== Location ==
Mutolere is located in the northern part of Kisoro Town, approximately 6 kilometres (4 mi), north of the central business district of the town. This approximately 78 kilometres (48 mi), by road, west of Kabale, the largest town in the Kigezi sub-region. The geographical coordinates of the Mutolere neighborhood are 01°14'56.0"S, 29°42'49.0"E (Latitude:-1.248889; Longitude:29.713611). Mutolere lies at an average elevation of 1,823 metres (5,981 ft), above sea level.

== Points of interest ==
These are some of the points of interest in or near Mutolere:

Mutolere is the location of St. Francis Hospital Mutolere, a 220-bed community hospital, owned and administered by the Roman Catholic Diocese of Kabale. The hospital has an affiliated nurses and midwives school, the Mutolere School of Nursing and Midwifery.

Another institution in the neighborhood is Mutolere Senior Secondary School, (also St. Paul's Secondary School, Mutolere), a residential all-boys middle and high school (grades 8-13). Former students at this school, include Kale Kayihura, the former Inspector General of Police, in the Uganda Police Force and Harrison Mutikanga, the Managing Director of the Uganda Electricity Generation Company Limited. Kasobede Dan (Station manager 91.1 Kisoro FM Radio) The student body at this school exceed 1,000. Nixon Kamugisha a Systems Administrator (Cyber Security) at Soroti University.

Other establishments in the neighborhood include St. Gertrude Girls School.

== See also ==
- Kale Kayihura
- Sam Bitangaro
- Harrison Mutikanga
- Kasobede Dan
- Nixon Kamugisha
