= Michael Taremwa Kananura =

Ugandan accountant, businessman and corporate executive

- Born: c. 1982 (age 42–43); Uganda
- Education: Makerere University; University of Stellenbosch; Cavendish University Uganda
- Occupation(s): Accountant, businessman & corporate executive
- Years active: 2008–present
- Title: Acting CEO at Uganda Electricity Transmission Company Limited

Michael Taremwa Kananura is a Ugandan accountant and corporate executive who was appointed as the acting CEO at Uganda Electricity Transmission Company Limited (UETCL), effective 10 August 2022. Previously, he was the chief financial officer at UETCL.

== Background and education ==
Kananura is a Ugandan national. He holds a Bachelor of Commerce degree from Makerere University, Uganda's oldest and largest public university. His Master of Philosophy degree in Development Finance was awarded by the University of Stellenbosch in South Africa. He is a Fellow of the Association of Chartered Certified Accountants (FCCA) of the United Kingdom and a member of the Institute of Certified Public Accountants of Uganda (ICPA). He also holds a Bachelor of Laws degree from Cavendish University Uganda. In addition, he holds a Diploma in Tax Planning and Tax Administration.

== Career ==
Kananura's business experience goes back almost 20 years, as of 2022.

He spent several years working for ActionAid Uganda and ActionAid Zambia in managerial positions. In May 2012, he transferred to the Uganda Revenue Authority. He spent there almost eight years, rising to the level of Manager of Regulatory Finance.

He was then hired by Uganda Electricity Distribution Company Limited (UEDCL), working as the chief financial officer, for two years. He was then hired by UETCL, working first as the Manager of Finance Accounts and Sales before being promoted to CFO.

At UETCL, Kananura replaced George Rwabajungu, who was relieved of his duties as managing director and CEO. In the management changes, announced by board chairman Kwame Ejalu, the board also selected a new acting deputy CEO, Richard Matsiko, who replaced Valentine Katabira, who retired.
