= Charity Basaza Mulenga =

Ugandan electric engineer

- Born: 1979 (age 46–47); Uganda
- Citizenship: Uganda
- Education: Makerere University (Bachelor of Science in electrical engineering); University of Loughborough (Master of Science in digital communication systems) (Doctor of Philosophy in electrical and electronic engineering)
- Occupations: Electrical engineer, academic administrator
- Years active: 2001 — present
- Known for: Administrative skills, engineering research
- Title: Former vice chancellor St. Augustine International University

Charity Basaza Mulenga is a Ugandan electrical engineer and academic administrator. She was the founding vice chancellor (2011 to 2016) of St. Augustine International University (SAIU), a private institution of higher education that the Uganda National Council for Higher Education accredited in 2011.

== Background and education ==
She was born circa 1979 in Kisoro District in the Western Region of Uganda.

Mulenga studied electrical engineering at Makerere University, the largest and oldest public university in Uganda, graduating with a Bachelor of Science degree in 2001. Her Master of Science degree in digital communication systems was awarded by the University of Loughborough in 2004. She also holds a Doctor of Philosophy degree in electrical and electronic engineering, awarded in 2010 by Loughborough University.

== Work experience ==
In 2001 Mulenga joined MTN Uganda as a switch planning engineer. In 2003, she left there to pursue a Master of Science degree in the United Kingdom on a British Council scholarship. She returned to Uganda in 2005 and joined the Faculty of Computing and Information Technology at Makerere University as a research coordinator. While there, she obtained another scholarship to pursue her doctorate. Her research area was antennas and electromagnetic modelling. During this period, she was appointed an assistant lecturer in the same faculty at Makerere. In 2009, she was appointed deputy vice chancellor at SAIU. Between 2011 and 2016, she served as vice chancellor at SAIU. She is a member of the University Council at SAIU.

== See also ==
- List of universities in Uganda
