= Sam Bitangaro =

Ugandan lawyer and politician

Honorable

Personal details
- Born: Sam Bitangaro; 6 October 1959 (age 66) Kisoro, Uganda
- Citizenship: Uganda
- Education: Makerere University (Bachelor of Laws); Law Development Centre (Diploma in Legal Practice)
- Occupation: Lawyer, politician
- Known for: Practice of law, politics

Samuel Kwizera Bitangaro (born 6 October 1959) is a Ugandan lawyer and politician. He is the elected Member of Parliament for Bufumbira County South, in Kisoro District, in the Western Region of Uganda, to the 10th Parliament (2016–2021).

He represented this constituency earlier in the 7th Parliament (2001–2006). He is a member of the ruling National Resistance Movement political party in Uganda.

He was a member of the Parliamentary Committee on Rules, Privileges and Discipline, the Legal and Parliamentary Affairs Committee and the NRM Parliamentary Caucus in the 10th Parliament of Uganda.

A former Minister of State for Gender and Culture, Bitangaro is the founding senior partner of Bitangaro and Company Advocates and the patron for Kisoro Foundation For Rural Development, a non-governmental organization in Kisoro District, Uganda. He is also a member of: the Uganda Law Society, the East Africa Law Society and; the International Bar Association.

== Early life and education ==
Bitangaro was born in Kisoro District, Kigezi sub-region, on 6 October 1959 in an Anglican family of the Bafumbira as the first born of six children. His father, Peter Bitangaro, was a health inspector and his mother, Evelyn Bitangaro, a primary school teacher.

He attended Seseme Primary School before transferring to St. Paul Secondary School Mutolere, in Mutolere, a suburb of Kisoro Town, where he completed his O-Level studies in 1977. In 1978 he was admitted to Namilyango College, in Mukono District, A-Level education where he was a chairperson of the School Council. He graduated with the equivalent of a High School Diploma in 1979.

Bitangaro entered Makerere University, Uganda's oldest and largest public university, where he was a chairman for Northcote Hall and graduated in 1983 with a Bachelor of Laws degree. He then obtained a Postgraduate Diploma in Legal Practice, from the Law Development Centre, in 1984.

== Career and politics ==
On acquiring a postgraduate diploma in legal practice, in 1986, Bitangaro was admitted to the Ugandan Bar as an advocate of the Uganda Courts of Judicature. He then practiced law with Nicholas Lwanga and Company Advocates up to 1994. He then joined Nsubuga Mubiru and Bitangaro Advocates, where he became a partner. In 1997, Bitangaro founded Bitangaro & Company Advocates where he still works to-date as a senior partner.

In 2001, during the non-party "Movement" system of government, Bitangaro joined elective politics and won his maiden election that ushered him into the 7th Parliament of Uganda as a representative for the constituents of Bufumbira County South. He was appointed as the Minister of State for Gender and Culture, In 2006, Bitangaro lost in his re-election bid to Tress Bucyanayandi.

In 2016, Bitangaro was for the second time elected to represent the same constituency, this time round on the National Resistance Movement ticket. He won both the party's primaries and the general elections in 2016 and became a member of the 10th Parliament, representing Bufumbira County South in Kisoro District.

== Personal details ==
Sam Bitangaro is married to Barbara Bitangaro, a journalist and public health specialist. They have three children: Brenda Bitangaro, Daudi Bitangaro and Kaze Bitangaro. Sam Bitangaro is a former diocesan chancellor for Muhabura Diocese and was the chairperson for Kisoro District Service Commission from 1997 to 2004.

== See also ==
- Kisoro District
- National Resistance Movement
- Parliament of Uganda
