= Keith Muhakanizi =

Keith Muhakanizi (24 November 1957 – 13 April 2023) was a Ugandan economist and permanent secretary in the Office of the Prime Minister (OPM).

== Early life and educational background ==
Muhakanizi was born on 24 November 1957 in Kitojo, Buyanja, Rukungiri District, to Rev. Kosia Kajwenge and Zerida Kajwenge (RIP). He was the third of seven children in a family of born‑again revivalists known as the Abaishemwe.

Keith Muhakanizi studied at Ntare School in Uganda from 1973 to 1978. In 1979, he joined Makerere University and graduated in 1982 with a Bachelor of Science in Economics. In 1984, he went to Warsaw, Poland, to earn a Diploma in National Economic Planning and Statistics. In 1989, he attended the University of Manchester, UK, where he completed a Master of Science in Development Economics.

== Career ==
Muhakanizi worked as an Economist in the Macroeconomic Planning Division of the Ministry of Finance from 1982 to 1988. From July 1988 to October 1991, he served as Senior Economist in the Macroeconomic Section and as Secretary to the Presidential Economic Council. Between November 1991 and December 1992, he was the Acting Commissioner for Macroeconomic Planning.

Muhakanizi served as Acting Economic Advisor to the Minister of Finance from January 1993 to April 1995. From April 1995 to August 1998, he was appointed Economic Advisor to the Minister of Finance. In September 1998, he became the Commissioner of Economic Development Policy and Research, a position he held until September 1999. He also served as Chairman of Housing Finance Bank Limited.

Muhakanizi served as Director of Economic Affairs from October 1999 to December 2004. From January 2005 to December 2005, he acted as Deputy Secretary to the Treasury. In December 2005, he was formally appointed Deputy Secretary to the Treasury, a position he held until May 2013. From May 2013 to June 2021, he served as Permanent Secretary to the Treasury, before being appointed Permanent Secretary in the Office of the Prime Minister (OPM) in July 2021.

== Personal life and death ==
In 1990, Muhakanizi married Janet Kamukama, and together they were blessed with three children: Nahum, Siima, and Noah. He passed away on Thursday, 13 April 2023, in Milan, Italy, where he was receiving treatment for cancer.
