= Ziria Tibalwa Waako =

- Born: Uganda
- Citizenship: Uganda
- Education: Makerere University (BSc in Electrical Engineering) (MSc in Electrical Engineering); Walden University (Master of Business Administration)
- Occupations: Electrical engineer, corporate executive
- Years active: 1993–present
- Title: Executive director & CEO of the Electricity Regulatory Authority
- Spouse: Paul Waako

Ziria Tibalwa Waako is a Ugandan electrical engineer and corporate executive, who has serves as the executive director and chief executive officer of the Electricity Regulatory Authority since November 2016. She replaced Benon Mutambi, who was appointed the Permanent Secretary of the Uganda Ministry of Internal Affairs. For the first four months, from November 2016 until March 2017, she served in an acting capacity, until her confirmation on 27 March 2017.

== Background and education ==
Waako holds an ordinary diploma in electrical engineering and an advanced diploma in electrical engineering, both obtained from Uganda Polytechnic Kyambogo (today Kyambogo University). She also has a Bachelor of Science and a Master of Science, both in Electrical engineering, and both obtained from Makerere University, in Kampala, Uganda's capital and largest city. In addition, she has a Master of Business Administration in Leadership, awarded by Walden University, in Minneapolis, Minnesota, United States.

== Career ==
Waako's career goes back for over 23 years. All of her adult working life has been spent in Uganda's electricity sector. She worked with the now defunct Uganda Electricity Board (UEB). When UEB was dissolved in 2001, she transferred to the Uganda Electricity Transmission Company Limited (UETCL). In 2012 she was appointed director of technical regulation at the Electricity Regulatory Authority, and served in that capacity until she was promoted to CEO at the regulatory agency.

In her role as the director of technical regulation at the ERA, she has been a strong promoter of the use of energy-saving bulbs to save electricity consumption. As a result of her recommendation, the government of Uganda spent US$4.1 million to purchase LED bulbs which were distributed to grid-connected customers, from October 2014 until April 2016. This saved an estimated 30 megawatts (40,000 hp).

== Family ==
Waako is married to Professor Paul Waako, a clinical pharmacologist and academic administrator, who since 1 May 2019, has served as the vice chancellor of Busitema University, a public university in the Eastern Region of Uganda. Together, they are parents to five children.

== Other considerations ==
Waako is a member of the Uganda Institute of Professional Engineers.
