= SEPCO =

Chinese construction and engineering company

SEPCO Electric Power Construction Corporation
- Founded: 1952
- Headquarters: Jinan, Shandong, China
- Number of employees: 20,000
- Website: Sepco

SEPCO Electric Power Construction Corporation (commonly known as SEPCO) is a Chinese construction and engineering company that designs and builds power generation and transmission infrastructure. SEPCO1 (SEPCOI) and SEPCO2 (SEPCO No. 2) are wholly owned subsidiaries.

By revenue, it is among the 100 largest construction contractors in the world in 2013.

SEPCO built the Candiota power plant in Brazil. Construction commenced in 2008 and it was successfully synchronized in 2010.

On the transmission side, it is constructing a US$650 million electricity transmission line in Zambia from the Maamba thermal power station, a project expected to be complete by 2015.
