= Kawanda =

- Map of Uganda showing location of Kawanda
- Coordinates: 00°25′14″N 32°32′26″E
- Country: Uganda
- Region: Central Uganda
- District: Wakiso District
- Elevation: 1,300 m (4,300 ft)
- Time zone: UTC+3 (EAT)

Kawanda is a town in Wakiso District, Central Uganda.

== Location ==
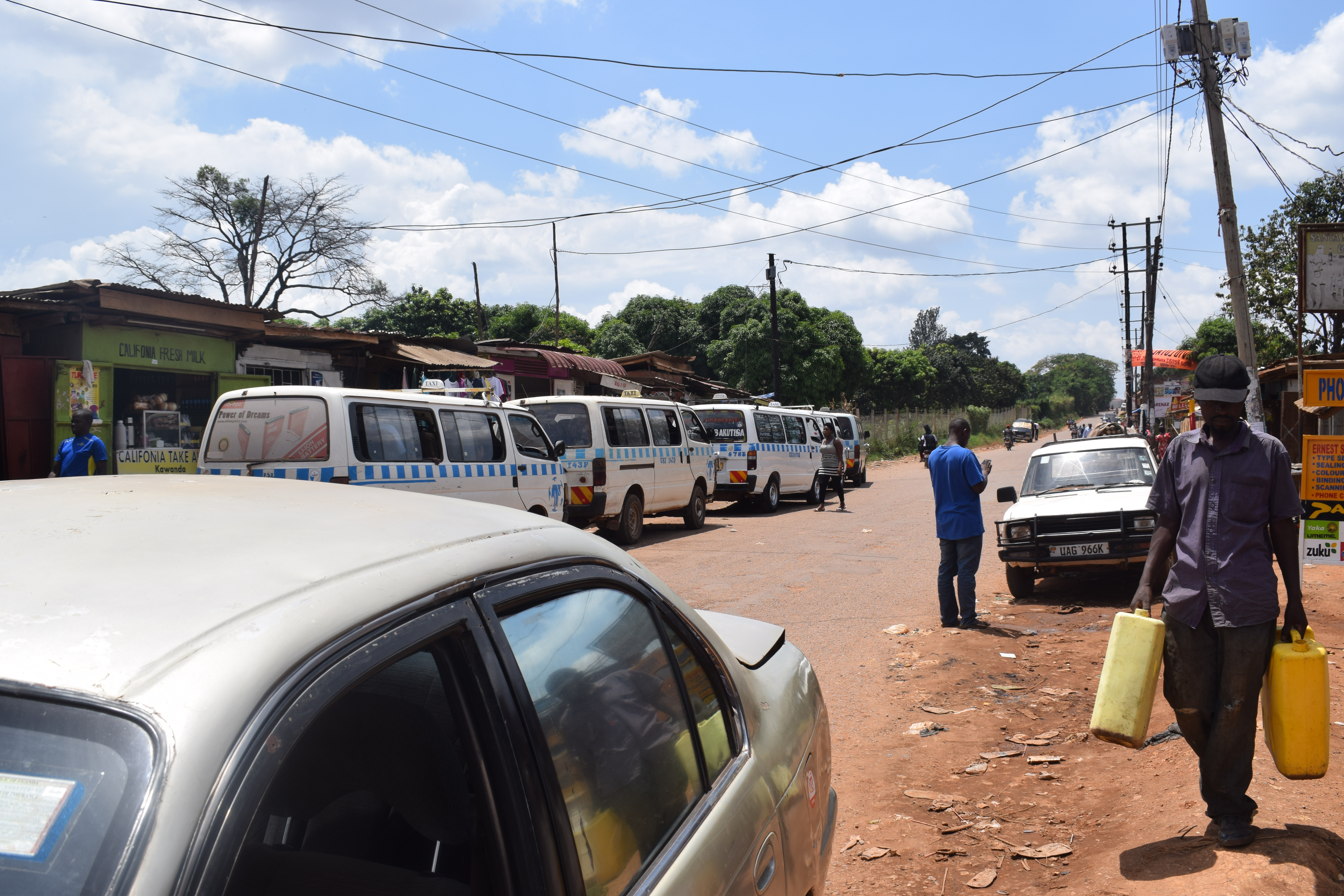
Taxi stage in Kawanda

The town is in Kawanda Parish, Nabweru Sub-county, being one of the six parishes in that administrative unit. Kawanda is approximately 13 kilometres (8.1 mi), by road, north of Kampala, the capital and largest city in Uganda. This is approximately 247 kilometres (153 mi) south of Karuma Falls, on the Kampala–Gulu Highway. The coordinates of the Kawanda are 0°25'14.0"N, 32°32'26.0"E (Latitude:0.420556; Longitude:32.540556).

== Overview ==
Kawanda is the location of Kawanda National Agricultural Research Laboratory, a unit of the National Agricultural Research Organisation. The laboratory carries out crop research, focusing primarily on banana varieties and their diseases.

The Uganda Electricity Transmission Company Limited maintains a major electricity substation that receives high voltage power from Bujagali Power Station via 73 kilometres (45 mi) of 220kV cables. A 264 kilometres (164 mi) 440kV electricity power line from Karuma Power Station is under construction to the company substation in Kawanda, under the supervision of Intec Gopa International Energy Consultants GmbH of the Federal Republic of Germany.
