= Sarah Wasagali Kanaabi =

Ugandan economist, academic, and former ERA chairperson

Dr. Sarah Wasagali Kanaabi

Chairperson, Electricity Regulatory Authority
- In office September 2020 – June 2025
- Preceded by: Richard Santo Apire

Personal details
- Born: 30 October 1967 (age 58) Buhugu, Sironko District, Uganda
- Spouse: Hatibu Kanabi
- Education: Makerere University; Islamic University in Uganda
- Occupation: Economist, Academic, Public Administrator
- Known for: First woman Chairperson of the Electricity Regulatory Authority (Uganda)

Sarah Wasagali Kanaabi (born 30 October 1967) is a Ugandan economist, academic, and public administrator. She served as Chairperson of the Electricity Regulatory Authority (ERA) from 2020 to 2025 making her the first woman to hold the position. She resigned in June 2025 to contest for Mbale Woman MP Seat under the National Resistance Movement (NRM).

== Background and education ==
Wasagali was born on 30 October 1967 in Buhugu sub-county, Sironko district. She attended Buhugu Primary School and North Road Primary School. She holds a BA in Social Science degree and a Masters in Economic Policy and Planning from Makerere University, a Postgraduate diploma in education and a Postgraduate diploma in Kiswahili obtained from Islamic University in Uganda (IUIU) in 1997. Kanaabi earned a Doctor of Philosophy (PhD) in economics from Makerere University.

== Academic and professional career ==
Kanaabi taught at Kibuli Secondary School and Bashir High School before she started teaching economics for more than two decades at the Islamic University in Uganda and Kyambogo University. In 1998, Kanaabi joined politics in Mbale when she was elected councilor. She served on boards including the Private Sector Development Center in Mbale, Eastern Private Sector Development Center Ltd, National Citizenship and Immigration Board and several secondary schools including Mbale Secondary School, Nkoma Secondary School, Hamudani Girls High School. She also delivered presentations on topics such as governance, gender, project planning, poverty, and HIV/AIDS.

== Career at Electricity Regulatory Authority ==
Kanaabi joined the Electricity Regulatory Authority (ERA) board in 2013 as a member and was appointed Chairperson in September 2020, succeeding Richard Santo Apire. During her tenure, ERA expanded generation capacity, diversified energy sources including hydro, solar, and thermal, and improved grid coverage. The Authority also reported growth in customer connections, reductions in distribution losses, and maintained high ratings in African Development Bank assessments.

In June 2025, Kanaabi resigned from ERA to contest for the Mbale Woman Member of Parliament seat un the National Resistance Movement (NRM). In August 2025 she announced that she would run as an independent candidate after losing the National Resistance Movement primaries, citing irregularities in the process.

== Recognition ==
Kanaabi is the first woman to chair ERA. She has publicly promoted women’s participation in the energy sector, the mentoring of young professionals, and transparency in public service.

== Personal life ==
Kanaabi is married to Hatibu Kanabi, a businessman in Mbale.
