= Proscovia Margaret Njuki =

- Born: 25 June 1951 (age 75)
- Citizenship: Uganda
- Education: University of Nairobi (Bachelor of Science in Electrical Engineering)
- Occupations: Electrical engineer & civil servant
- Years active: 1974–present
- Title: Chairperson of Uganda Electricity Generation Company Limited
- Spouse: Samwiri H.K. Njuki (m. 1977)
- Children: 3
- Parent(s): Reverend and Mrs. Benoni Kaggwa-Lwanga

Proscovia Margaret Njuki is a Ugandan electrical engineer and civil servant. Effective 24 November 2016, she serves as the chairperson of the board of directors of Uganda Electricity Generation Company Limited (UEGCL). She replaced Stephen Isabalija, who was appointed permanent secretary at the Uganda Ministry of Energy and Mineral Development.

== Background and education ==
Njuki was born on 25 June 1951 to Reverend and Mrs. Benoni Kaggwa-Lwanga. She attended Gayaza High School for her O-Level and A-Level education. She studied at the University of Nairobi, graduating with a Bachelor of Science in electrical engineering in 1974, the first female Ugandan to graduate as an engineer.

== Career ==
Following graduation from Nairobi, Njuki returned to Uganda and began work as a telecommunications engineer at the then national television station, Uganda Television (UTV). She rose through the ranks and in 1994, was appointed the head of UTV engineering services. In 1995, she was appointed Commissioner of UTV. Prior to assuming the chairmanship at UEGCL, she served as a member of that body, chaired by Dr. Stephen Isabalija.

== Other responsibilities ==
Njuki is a founder-member of the Association of Women Engineers, Technicians and Scientists in Uganda, since 1989. She is also a member of the Institution of Professional Engineers in Uganda and served on its executive council from 1990 until 1993.

== Personal ==
In 1977, she married Samwiri H.K. Njuki; they have two daughters and one son.
