= URA House =

Office building in Uganda

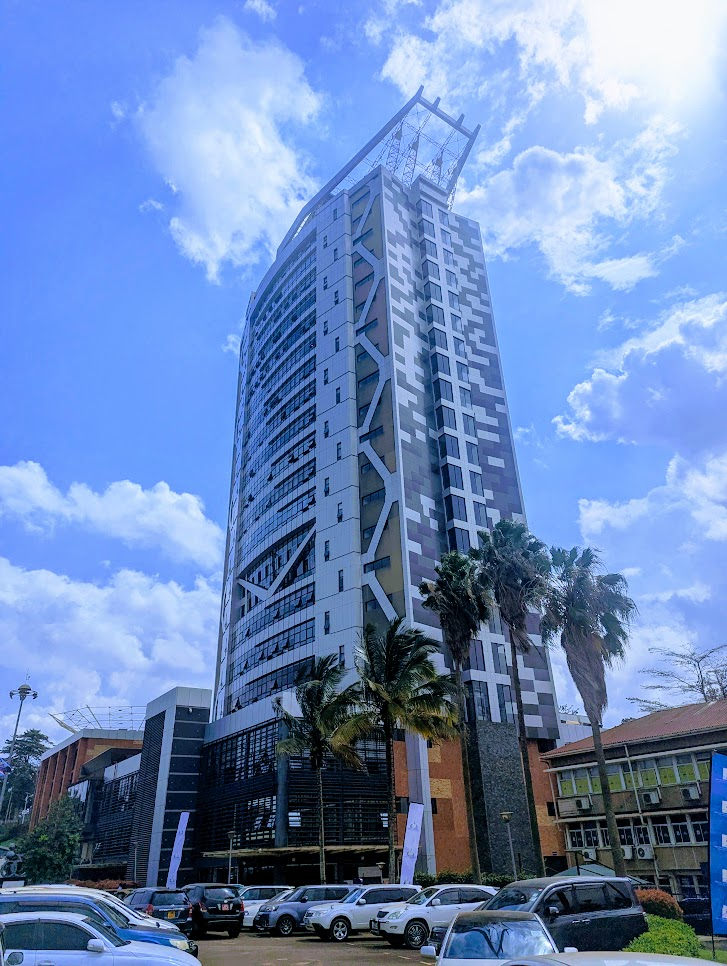

- Location within Kampala

General information
- Type: Office
- Location: Nakawa, Kampala, Uganda
- Coordinates: 00°19′49″N 32°37′10″E
- Construction started: 4 February 2015
- Completed: 19 January 2019
- Cost: US$37 million

Technical details
- Floor count: 22
- Floor area: 26,021 square metres (280,088 sq ft)

URA House, also URA Tower, is a building in Uganda's capital Kampala, that serves as the headquarters of Uganda Revenue Authority (URA).

== Location ==
The building is located in Nakawa, a Kampala neighborhood that is approximately 6 kilometres (4 mi), by road, east of the city center. The coordinates of URA House are 0°19'49.0"N, 32°37'10.0"E (Latitude:0.330278; Longitude:32.619444).

== Overview ==
Prior to 2015, the offices of URA were scattered in multiple rented locations across the city of Kampala. As of August 2016, URA spent US$3.5 million in rent and US$1.5 million in operational expenses annually.

In February 2015, the agency began construction of a 22-storey skyscraper to consolidate all the agency offices in the city under one roof and save money in rent and operational expenses. Completion was scheduled for 2018. URA plans to use the savings to improve its upcountry offices.

As of July 2018, the building was nearly complete, with commissioning expected during the second half of 2018. The tarmac road, Walusimbi Lane, from Nakawa to the new building, has been completed at a cost of USh2.57 billion (approx. US$680,000), funded by the Ugandan government. The URA House itself was budgeted at USh140 billion (approx. US$37 million), in construction costs.

On 19 January 2019, the president of Uganda Yoweri Museveni, officially commissioned the completed skyscraper.

== Properties ==
The building rises 22 floors above ground, with usable space of 26,021 square metres (280,088 sq ft). Maximum occupancy is calculated at 1,700 people. There is provision for underground parking for 360 cars, and surface parking for 710 vehicles. The parking structure measures 12,923 square metres (139,102 sq ft), on five levels for parking and the sixth level designed with space for a breastfeeding centre for staff.

== See also ==
- Kampala Capital City Authority
- List of tallest buildings in Kampala
- Uganda Ministry of Finance
- Nakawa Division
- Electricity Regulatory Authority House
