= Ayago Hydroelectric Power Station =

Power station in Uganda

- Map of Uganda showing the location of Ayago.
- Country: Uganda
- Location: Ayago, Nwoya District
- Coordinates: 02°17′02″N 32°01′21″E
- Purpose: Power
- Status: Proposed

Dam and spillways
- Impounds: Victoria Nile

Ayago Power Station
- Commission date: 2035 (Expected)
- Installed capacity: 840 megawatts (1,130,000 hp)

Ayago Hydroelectric Power Station, also Ayago Power Station, is a planned 840 megawatt hydroelectric power project to be constructed in Uganda. If it is built, Ayago would be the largest power station in Uganda, based on generating capacity.

== Location ==
The power station will be located at Ayago, on the Victoria Nile, in Nwoya District, in the Acholi sub-region, in the Northern Region of Uganda. This location is close to the point where the Ayago River enters the Victoria Nile, within the confines of Murchison Falls National Park.

== Overview ==
Ayago Power Station is a proposed 840-megawatt (1,130,000 hp) hydroelectric plant that will be constructed on the Victoria Nile, downstream of Karuma Power Station, but upstream of Murchison Falls. The project will be developed in two simultaneous phases, known as Ayago North (estimated capacity:450 MW) and Ayago South (estimated capacity:390 MW). The Ayago Power Station is one of three hydropower projects that have been earmarked for immediate development, together with Karuma Power Station (600 MW) and Isimba Power Station (183 MW), to mitigate the chronic, recalcitrant power shortages that have plagued Uganda since the 1990s, and to meet the projected national requirement of 1,130 MW by 2023.

== Construction costs ==
The Indian state-owned energy and manufacturing company, BHEL, had estimated the cost of the project at about US$350 million in 2007. But that was for a project with planned capacity of 200 MW to 300 MW, back in 2007.

In 2008, the Government of Japan, through the Japan International Cooperation Agency (JICA), in collaboration with the Government of Uganda, began preparations for fresh environmental impact assessments, international bidding for a contractor and commitment as a lead funding source for the project.

In April 2013, the Government of Uganda awarded the US$1.9 billion construction contract to Mapa Construction and Trading Company Incorporated, a Turkish infrastructure construction company. However, in August 2013, that award was rescinded and the construction contract was awarded to China Gezhouba Construction Company. It was anticipated that construction would begin in 2020, and last approximately 66 months.

== Recent developments ==
By 2019, the size of Ayago Power Station had been increased from 600 to 840 megawatts. The government of Uganda has publicly indicated that it would like the power station built, but it lacks the financial muscle to do so itself. Both Mapa Construction and Trade Company of Turkey and the Gezhouba Group of China have lost interest in the project, partly due to failure to raise the necessary capital.

In February 2020, Power Construction Corporation of China (PowerChina), a Chinese government-owned engineering and construction conglomerate made formal application to the Electricity Regulatory Authority (ERA), to design, fund, build, operate and maintain Ayago Power Station. ERA's response to that application has not been made public as of September 2020.

The cost of constructing Ayago has also increased to over US$2 billion, on account of the increase in wattage capacity, from the original 600 MW to the current 840 MW. As of February 2025, the government of Uganda was looking for a new investor to develop Ayago HPP.

== See also ==
- Isimba Power Station
- Karuma Power Station
- Uganda Power Stations
- Africa Energy Dams
- World Energy Dams
- Nwoya District
- Northern Uganda
