= Mutolere Hospital =

Private, faith-based teaching, community hospital in Uganda

- Uganda Catholic Medical Bureau

Geography
- Location: Mutolere, Kisoro District, Western Region, Uganda
- Coordinates: 01°15′45″S 29°43′12″E

Organisation
- Care system: Private
- Type: Community

Services
- Emergency department: I
- Beds: 220

History
- Founded: 1947; 79 years ago

Links
- Website: www.mutolerehospital.ug
- Other links: Hospitals in Uganda; Medical education in Uganda

Saint Francis Hospital, Mutolere, commonly referred to as Mutolere Hospital, is a private, community hospital, in Mutolere, Kisoro District, in the Western Region of Uganda.

== Location ==
The hospital is located in the neighborhood called Mutolere, a suburb of Kisoro Town, approximately 6 kilometres (3.7 mi), by road, northeast of Kisoro Town, where the district headquarters are located. This location, lies in extreme southwestern Uganda, close to the International borders with the Democratic Republic of the Congo and with the Republic of Rwanda. Mutolere Hospital lies approximately 71 kilometres (44 mi), west of Kabale Regional Referral Hospital, in the city of Kabale, the nearest large urban centre. The geographical coordinates of Mutolere Hospital are: 01°15'45.0"S, 29°43'12.0"E (Latitude:-1.262500; Longitude:29.720000).

== Overview ==
St. Francis Hospital, Mutolere is a private, non-profit, community hospital owned by the Roman Catholic Diocese of Kabale. It is accredited to the Uganda Catholic Medical Bureau, and it is administered by the Little Sisters of Saint Francis, a religious congregation. The hospital serves patients from within Kisoro District and from the neighboring districts of Rukungiri, Kanungu and Kabale. A percentage of their patients come from across the borders, in the Democratic Republic of the Congo and the Republic of Rwanda. Founded in 1947, the hospital also maintains a nurses and midwives training school, the Mutolere School of Nursing and Midwifery, established in 1984.

== Community outreach ==
The hospital partners with organizations and individuals inside and outside Luanda to improve the lives of the community, where the hospital is located. One such partner is the non-profit organization, Sustain for Life which, in collaboration with Mutolere Hospital, provides "healthcare, preventative medicine and education" to the Batwa communities in Kisoro District, Uganda. The program has been operational since 2010.

== See also ==
- List of hospitals in Uganda
