= Ramathan Ggoobi =

Ugandan economist (born c. 1980)

- Born: c. 1980 (age 45–46); Butambala District, Uganda
- Education: Makerere University (B.A., M.A.); Nelson Mandela University (PhD)
- Occupations: Economist; academic; public administrator
- Years active: 2008–present
- Known for: Academics and economic policy research
- Title: Permanent Secretary at the Uganda Ministry of Finance

Ramathan Ggoobi, is a Ugandan economist, economic policy analyst, academic and public administrator, who serves as the permanent secretary of the Uganda Ministry of Finance, Planning and Economic Development and "Secretary to the Treasury of the Republic of Uganda", since 15 July 2021. Before that Ggoobi was a lecturer, economic policy analyst and researcher at Makerere University Business School, since 2008.

== Background and education ==
He was born in the Buganda Region of Uganda circa 1980. After attending local primary and secondary schools, he was admitted to Makerere University, Uganda's oldest and largest public university. He graduated with a Bachelor of Arts in Economics in 2003. He followed that with a Master of Arts degree in Economic Policy and Planning, also from Makerere University in 2011. His Doctor of Philosophy in Economics was awarded by the Nelson Mandela University in South Africa in 2025. He also holds a Certificate in Sustainable Development, awarded in 2015 by Columbia University, and a Certificate in Energy Economics, awarded by Total Global, in 2016. In addition, he attended two classes at Harvard Kennedy School in 2024; a Certificate in Strategies for Inclusive Growth Economics and Certificate in Leading Economic Growth, Economics.

== Career ==
Ggoobi has been a lecturer and a researcher at Makerere University Business School since January 2008. For the first three years, he was an assistant lecturer. Starting January 2011, until July 2021 he was a tenured lecturer, who supervised undergraduate and postgraduate students at the school. During that period, he headed the MUBS Economic Forum, a think-tank that carried out economic policy research that led to public debates and generated policy solutions to some of the county's economic challenges. Between September 2017 and September 2020, he served on the Board of Directors of the Uganda Development Corporation (UDC), the investment arm of the Government of Uganda. From June 2020 until July 2021, he served as a Senior Presidential Advisor on the National Economy.

On 15 July 2021, president Yoweri Museveni made wide-reaching changes affecting a number of cabinet ministries, including the retirement of seven permanent secretaries. As part of those changes, Ramathan Ggoobi was appointed Permanent Secretary of the Finance ministry and concurrently Secretary to the Uganda Treasury.

== Other considerations ==
During the first two decades of the 21st century, Ggoobi has been hired as a consultant by several organizations including: (a) the International Labour Organization (ILO) (b) the Overseas Development Institute (ODI) of the United Kingdom (c) the Friedrich Ebert Foundation (FES) of Germany, (d) the Financial Sector Deepening Uganda (FSDU) and (e) the Action Coalition for Development and Environment (ACODE), among many others. He is reported to be the driving force behind the country's economic growth post-COVID19 Pandemic. He is reported to support "public policies informed by research, science and economics".

== See also ==
- Economy of Uganda
