= Uganda Electricity Distribution Company Limited =

Ugandan utility company

Coordinates: 00°19′35″N 32°34′38″E

Uganda Electricity Distribution Company Limited (UEDCL)
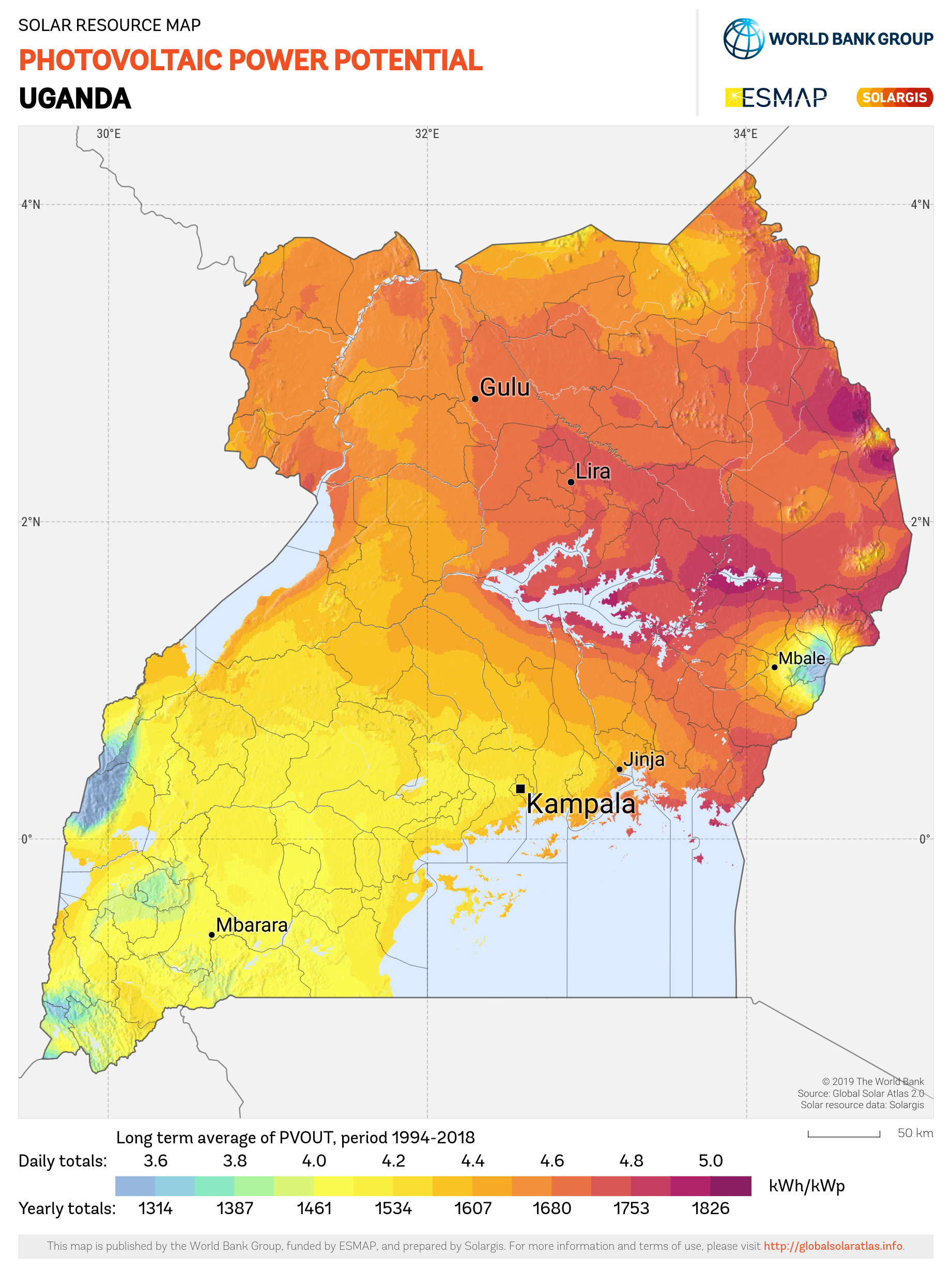
- Photovoltaic power potential map Uganda
- Type: Parastatal
- Industry: Power distribution
- Founded: April 1, 2001; 25 years ago
- Headquarters: 6th Floor, UEDCL Tower; 37 Nakasero Road; Kampala, Uganda
- Key people: Stella Marie Biwaga; Chairman; Joselynne Rwabogo Rwakakooko; Acting Managing Director
- Products: Electricity, electric poles
- Revenue: UGX 1.71 trillion (approx. US$454.72 million) (2025)
- Number of employees: 2,700+ (2025)
- Website: Homepage

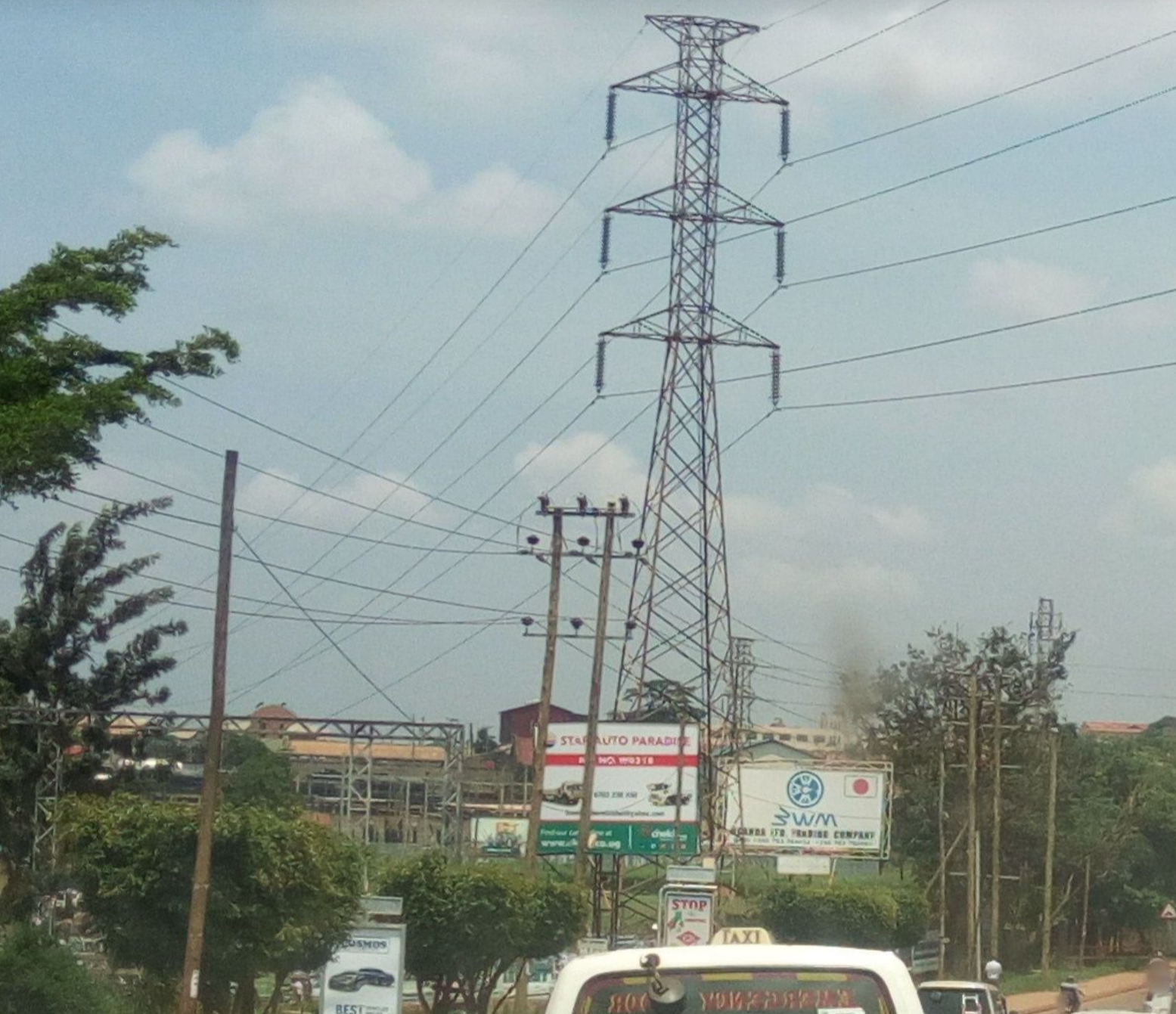
Electricity distribution by pylons in Uganda

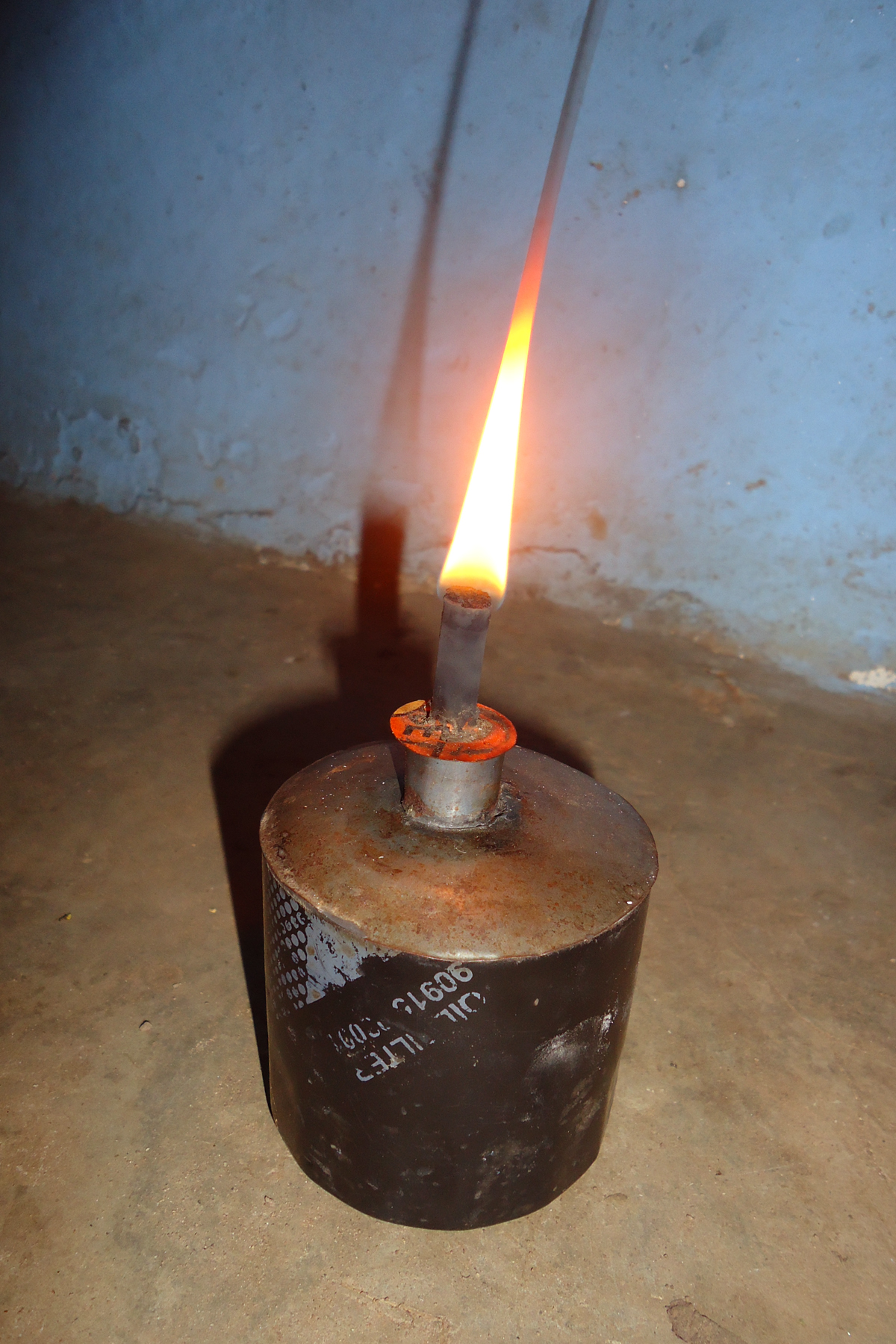
Locally called "Tadooba", a source of light

The Uganda Electricity Distribution Company Limited (UEDCL) is a parastatal company whose primary purpose is to distribute electric power to domestic and commercial end-users in Uganda, at and below 33 kiloVolts. This role was sub-leased to Umeme for a 20-year concession that ended on 31 March 2025.

== Location ==
UEDCL headquarters are located on the sixth floor of UEDCL Towers, 37 Nakasero Road, Nakasero Hill, in Kampala, Uganda's capital and largest city. The coordinates of the company headquarters are 0°19'35.0"N, 32°34'38.0"E (Latitude:0.326390; Longitude:32.577222).

== History ==
UEDCL was established in 2001 by an act of the Ugandan parliament following the break-up of the Uganda Electricity Board. In 2005, Umeme took over the majority of assets and responsibilities of UEDCL for a period of 20 years on a concessionary basis.

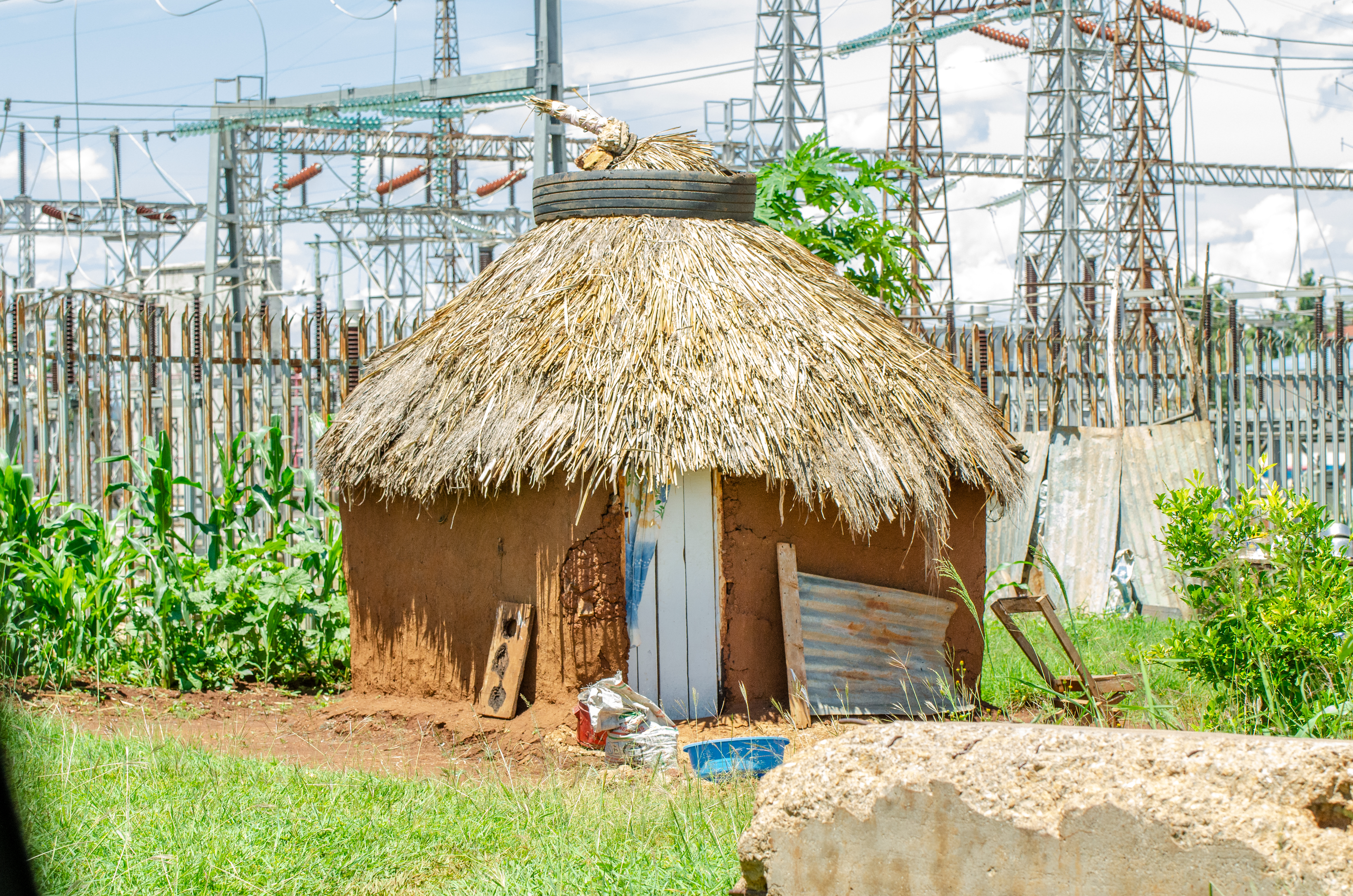
Hut in Garden besides high voltage center

In 2018, the Natural Resources Committee of the Ugandan Parliament weighed the benefits and consequences of terminating that concession earlier than 2025. The committee was informed by Joseph Katera, the UEDCL managing director, that the government needed to invest at least US$100 million on an annual basis, to maintain on-going operations. Another US$330 million break-up fee would be due to Umeme at the time of premature termination.

== Operations ==
During the period of the concession to Umeme, UEDCL had the following operations: (a) Monitor Umeme's adherence to the terms of the concession (b) Maintain and operate the off-grid power networks in the districts of Adjumani, Moroto and Moyo and (c) Supervise the completion of the grid-expansion projects that were under construction by the Rural Electrification Network, a sister government agency, at the time the Umeme concession was initialized (d) Maintain, operate, and manage the electric pole treatment plant at Lugogo in Central Kampala.

== Governance ==
UEDCL is governed by a seven-person board of directors. As of May 2026, the chairperson was Stella Marie Biwaga. The Company's acting managing director is Joselynne Rwabogo Rwakakooko.

== Developments ==
In February 2021, Ugandan online media reported that the Electricity Regulatory Authority of Uganda had cancelled the electricity distribution license of Bundibugyo Energy Cooperative Society (BECS), which had been responsible for energy distribution in Bundibugyo District. That license was immediately transferred to UEDCL. The affected distribution area includes Ntoroko District and parts of Kabarole District.

On 31 March 2025, following the end of UMEME's 20-year concession and the failure of the concerned parties to renew the concession, UMEME handed over the distribution of electricity in Uganda to UEDCL. There is a variance between the money UMEME expected as regards the buyout amount and what Uganda's Auditor General calculated. That difference will be settled in arbitration to take place in London, United Kingdom.

== Maximum demand ==
According to Uganda's Electricity Regulatory Authority (ERA), the country's maximum demand was 1,202.9 MW and growing at 25 percent annually, as of June 2025. Of that, 1,023.2 MW was domestic demand while 179.7 MW was export demand. By December 2025, maximum demand was 1,345.3 MW and growing at about 20 percent annually. At that time, 1,166.2 MW was domestic demand and 179.1 MW was export demand.

== Customer base ==
At the beginning of April 2025, UEDCL had an estimated 2,464,000 electricity accounts. During the next 12 months, the utility added an estimated 236,000 new customers. As of March 2026 the total customer base was 2.7 million, with a growrth rate of about 9.98 percent per annum.

Number of grid-connected customers at end of March
Rank	Year	Customers	New customers	% growth
1	2025	2,464,000	–	–
2	2026	2,700,000	236,000	9.98

== See also ==
- Electricity Regulatory Authority
- Energy in Uganda
