= Uganda Electricity Generation Company Limited =

Power generation company

Coordinates: 00°19′35″N 32°34′38″E

Uganda Electricity Generation Company Limited (UEGCL)
- Company type: Parastatal
- Industry: Power generation
- Founded: 2001
- Headquarters: Block C, Victoria Office Park; 6-9 Okot Close, Bukoto; Kampala, Uganda
- Key people: Proscovia Margaret Njuki; Chairperson; Harrison E. Mutikanga; CEO
- Products: Electricity
- Revenue: ▲(Aftertax) USh2.8 billion (US$770,220) (2020)
- Total assets: USh7.1 trillion (US$1.953 billion) (2020)
- Number of employees: 200 (2020)
- Website: Homepage

The Uganda Electricity Generation Company Limited (UEGCL) is a parastatal company whose primary purpose is to generate electric power for use in Uganda and for sale to neighboring countries. As of December 2017, UEGCL's generation capacity was 380 megawatts, with that capacity planned to increase to over 1,300 megawatts, by 2023.

== Location ==
The headquarters of UEGCL are on Block C, Victoria Office Park, Plot 6-9 Okot Close, Bukoto, in Kampala, Uganda's capital and largest city. Its coordinates are 0°19'35.0"N, 32°34'38.0"E (Latitude:0.326389; Longitude:32.577222). The company maintains a second office at 18-20 Faraday Road, Amberly Estate, in Jinja, a city located approximately 80 kilometres (50 mi), by road, east of Kampala.

== History ==
UEGCL was incorporated by the Uganda Ministry of Finance, Planning and Economic Development in 2001, following the break-up of the Uganda Electricity Board.

== Operations ==
UEGCL is responsible for the operation, maintenance, and improvement of the power stations owned by the Ugandan government.

In 2002, UEGCL executed a 20-year operational, management, and maintenance concession to Eskom Uganda Limited, a subsidiary of South African energy company Eskom, to cover the two power stations UEGCL owned at the time: Kiira Power Station and Nalubaale Power Station. Eskom sold the electricity it generated to the Uganda Electricity Transmission Company Limited (UETCL) as the authorized single buyer. UETCL resells the power to Umeme, the energy distributor, which then sells it to the public.

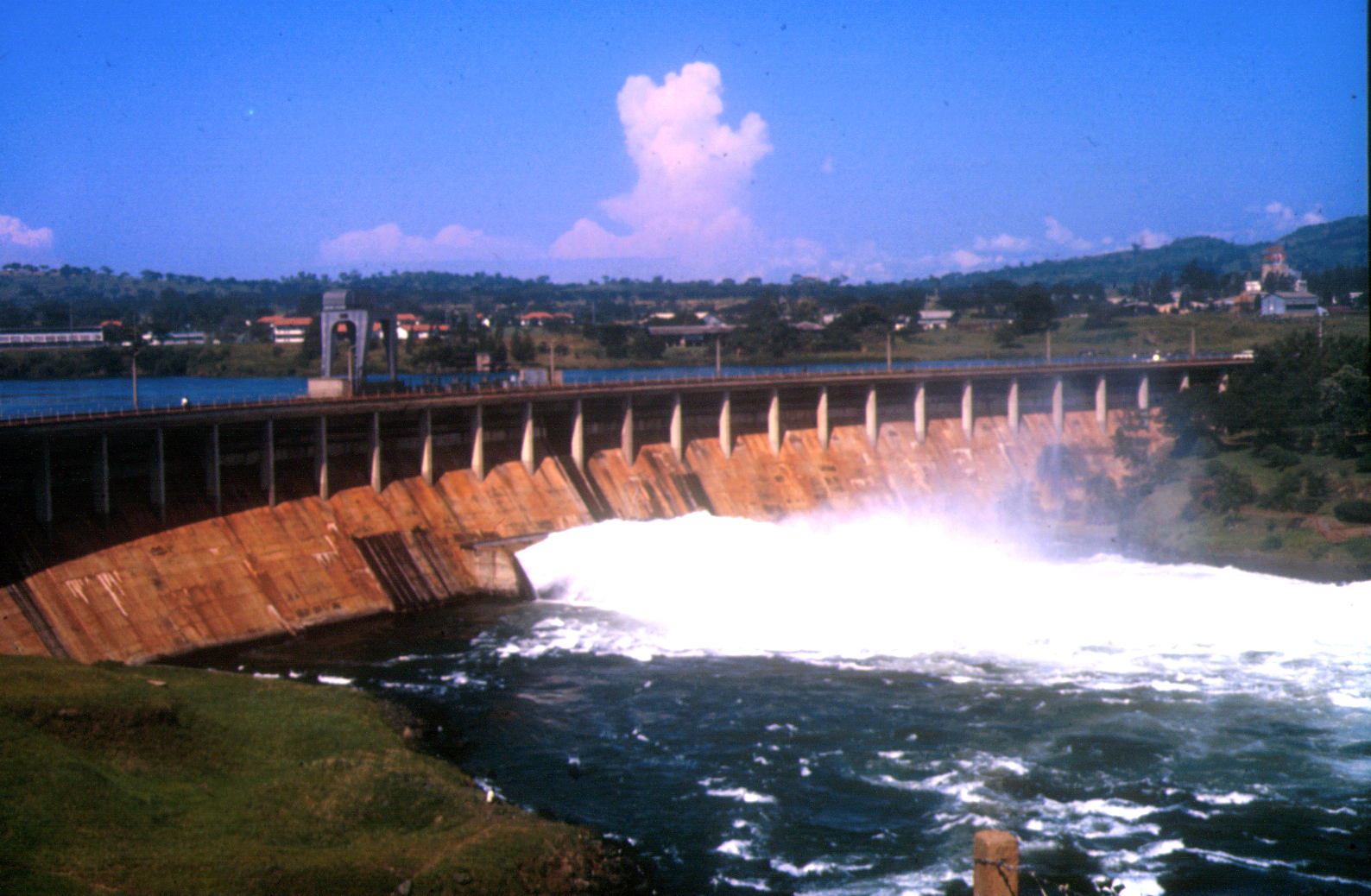
Generation of hydroelectric power at Owen falls dam

As of 30 June 2020, UEGCL controlled 563 megawatts of the national installed generation capacity of 1,252 megawatts, accounting for about 45 percent. It is expected that when the 600 megawatts Karuma Power Station comes on board, UEGCL will control an estimated 1,163 MW out of 1,852 MW, accounting for about 62 percent at that time.

== Planned initial public offering ==
In January 2015, the UEGCL chairman announced plans to list shares of company stock on the Uganda Securities Exchange in an initial public offering within the following two years. The funds raised would be used to develop more electricity generation stations, thus adding to national electricity output. At that time, UEGCL owned 380 megawatts of generating capacity, with a goal to increase to 563 megawatts in 2018 and 1,213 megawatts in 2020.

As of November 2024, UEGCL owned the generation stations listed in the table below:

UEGCL Power Stations Portfolio
Rank	Name of Station	Generation Capacity (MW)
1	Nalubaale Hydroelectric Power Station	180.0
2	Kiira Hydroelectric Power Station	200.0
3	Isimba Hydroelectric Power Station	183.0
4	Namanve Thermal Power Station	50.0
5	Tororo Thermal Power Station	50.0
6	Karuma Hydroelectric Power Station	600.0
	Total	1,263.00

== Power stations ==
=== Operational stations ===
- Nalubaale Hydroelectric Power Station: 180 megawatts
- Kiira Hydroelectric Power Station: 200 megawatts
- Isimba Hydroelectric Power Station: 183 megawatts
- Namanve Thermal Power Station: 50 megawatts
- Karuma Power Station: 600 megawatts

=== Power stations in development ===
- Ayago Power Station: 840 megawatts
- Nyagak III Power Station: 6.6 megawatts
- Muzizi Power Station: 48 megawatts
- Oriang Hydroelectric Power Station
- Kiba Hydroelectric Power Station

== Governance ==
UEGCL is governed by a seven-person board of directors whose chairman is Proscovia Margaret Njuki. Other UEGCL board members include (a) Zachary Baguma Atwooki, (b) Ms. Hope Bizimana, (c) Paul Patrick Mwanja, (d) Nixon Kamukama and (e) Mark Martin Obia. The chief executive officer is Harrison E. Mutikanga. In August 2017, UEGCL received the ISO 9001: 2015 certification, becoming the first Ugandan government agency to receive this certification.

== Corporate social responsibility ==
In December 2021, UEGCL launched a corporate social responsibility (CSR) project to extend grid electricity to over 40 villages in both Kayunga District and Kamuli District, as mitigation for "the increased pressure on local infrastructure, social services, and livelihoods arising from the construction of the.." Isimba Hydroelectric Power Station. The project is expected to last 24 months in Kayunga District and 36 months in Kamuli District. It will cost USh11 billion (approx. US$3.1 million).

== See also ==
- List of power stations in Uganda
- Electricity Regulatory Authority
- Energy in Uganda
