= Karuma Hydroelectric Power Station =

Power plant in Karuma Falls, Uganda

Karuma Hydro Power Station
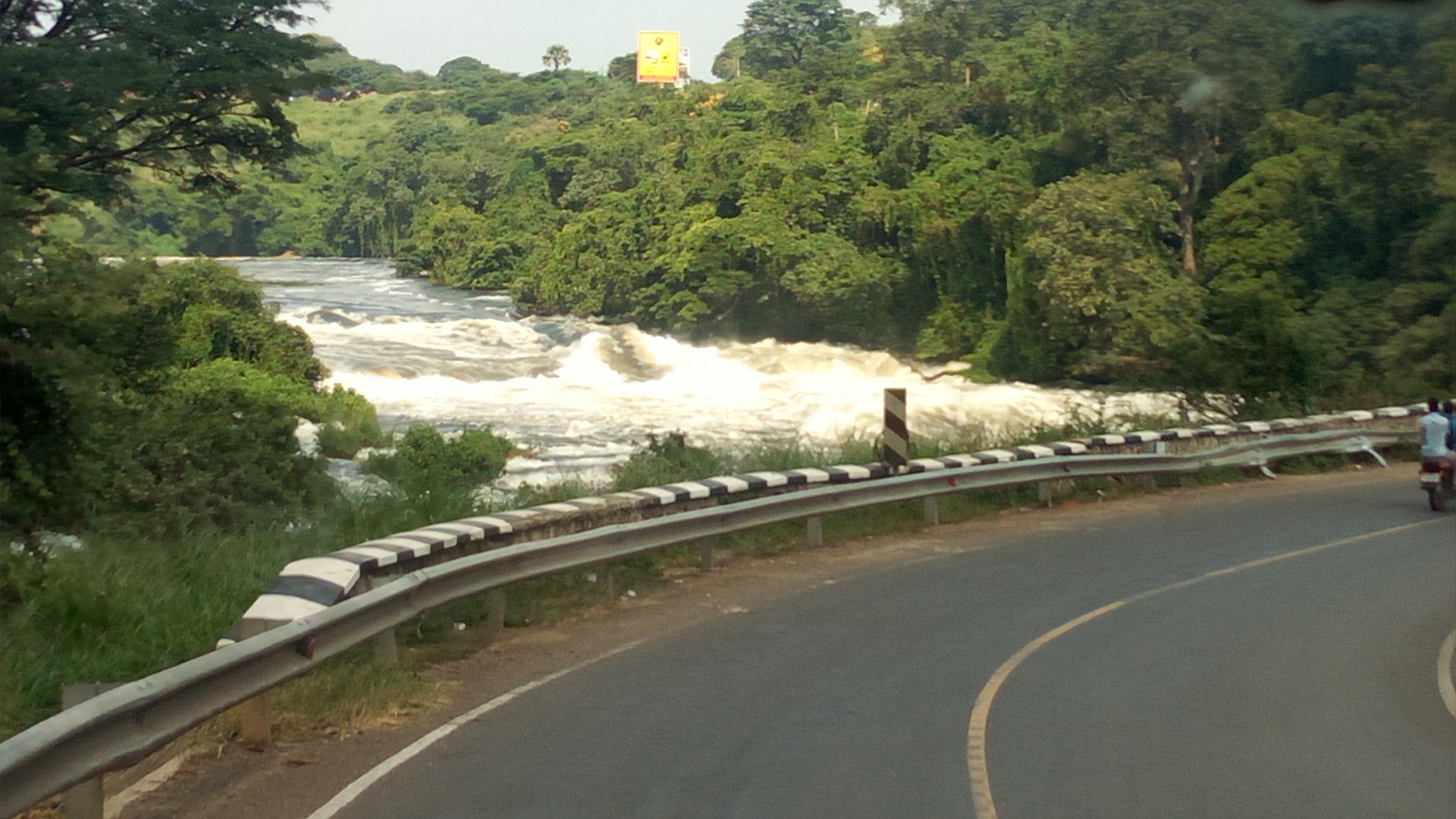
- Karuma Bridge

- Map of Uganda showing the location of Karuma Falls Karuma Hydro Power Station (Africa) Karuma Hydro Power Station (Earth)
- Official name: Karuma Hydropower Station
- Country: Uganda
- Location: Karuma Falls
- Coordinates: 2°14′55″N 32°16′06″E
- Status: Operational
- Construction began: 16 December 2013
- Opening date: 26 September 2024
- Construction cost: US$1,688,380,000
- Owner: Ugandan government
- Operator: Uganda Electricity Generation Company Limited (UEGCL)

Dam and spillways
- Type of dam: Mass concrete
- Impounds: Victoria Nile
- Height: 14
- Length: 314.43
- Elevation at crest: 1032
- Spillways: 8

Reservoir
- Total capacity: 79,870,000 cubic metres (2.820582431×10^{9} cu ft)
- Normal elevation: 1,000 m (3,300 ft)

Power Station
- Operator: UEGCL
- Commission date: 26 September 2024
- Type: Run of the river
- Hydraulic head: 71 metres (233 ft)
- Turbines: 6 x 100 MW (Francis)
- Installed capacity: 600 MW
- Annual generation: 4,373 GWh

The Karuma Hydroelectric Power Station is an operational 600 MW hydroelectric power station in Uganda. It is the largest power-generating installation in the country. The project was awarded to Chinese engineering firm Sinohydro Corporation, a contracting subsidiary of the state-owned Power China.

The project has faced major delays and rising costs. Initially planned for completion in 60 months, the project has stretched to about 114 months, roughly a 4.5-year delay. This prolonged timeline has significantly increased expenses. The original budget of about $1.7 billion (SH$6.323 trillion) has climbed to roughly SH$8.18 trillion, with additional costs including about 113.9 billion shillings in accrued interest due to delayed payments.

== History ==
As far back as 1995, the government of Uganda planned to construct a hydropower station at the site of the Karuma Falls. Initially, Norpak, a Norwegian energy company, was awarded the contract to perform the feasibility study and the environmental impact assessment (EIA) for the dam. The World Bank promised to make a loan available to pay for the construction. The feasibility study report was made available in October 2006. Bids for construction of the project went out in November 2006. Initially, the plan was to build a 200-250 megawatt power station.

In 2009, the plans were redrawn, calling for a much larger project of 750 megawatts. In 2009, Norpak pulled out of the negotiations with the Ugandan government, due to the Great Recession.

The Ugandan government then contracted with Energy Infratech Private Limited to perform a new feasibility study and a new EIA, given that a larger power station was now being planned. At that time, construction was expected to start in 2012 and last six years.

In July 2011, media reports indicated that the maximum capacity of the project had been scaled back to 600 megawatts from 750 megawatts. Some international development partners wanted to scale back even further, to a maximum capacity of 400 to 450 megawatts.

== Technical specifications ==
Karuma Power Station comprises a roller compacted concrete gravity dam, that measures 20 metres (66 ft) high and 312 metres (1,024 ft) long. There are six water intake towers, each measuring 20 metres (66 ft) high and 29 metres (95 ft) wide. The underground chamber housing the six vertical Francis turbines of 100MW each, measures 200 metres (656 ft) long, 21.3 metres (70 ft) wide, and 53 metres (174 ft) high.

=== Location ===
The power station is located on the Victoria Nile, at the former location of the Karuma Falls. This location is approximately 2.5 kilometres (1.6 mi) upstream of where the Masindi-Gulu Highway crosses the Nile. By road, it is approximately 99 kilometres (62 mi) northeast of Masindi and 75 kilometres (47 mi) south of Gulu.

The electrical-mechanical installations of the power station are located approximately 100 metres (328 ft) underground, with 26.5 kilometres (16 mi) of underground access roads, making Karuma the 14th largest underground power station in the world.

== Construction ==
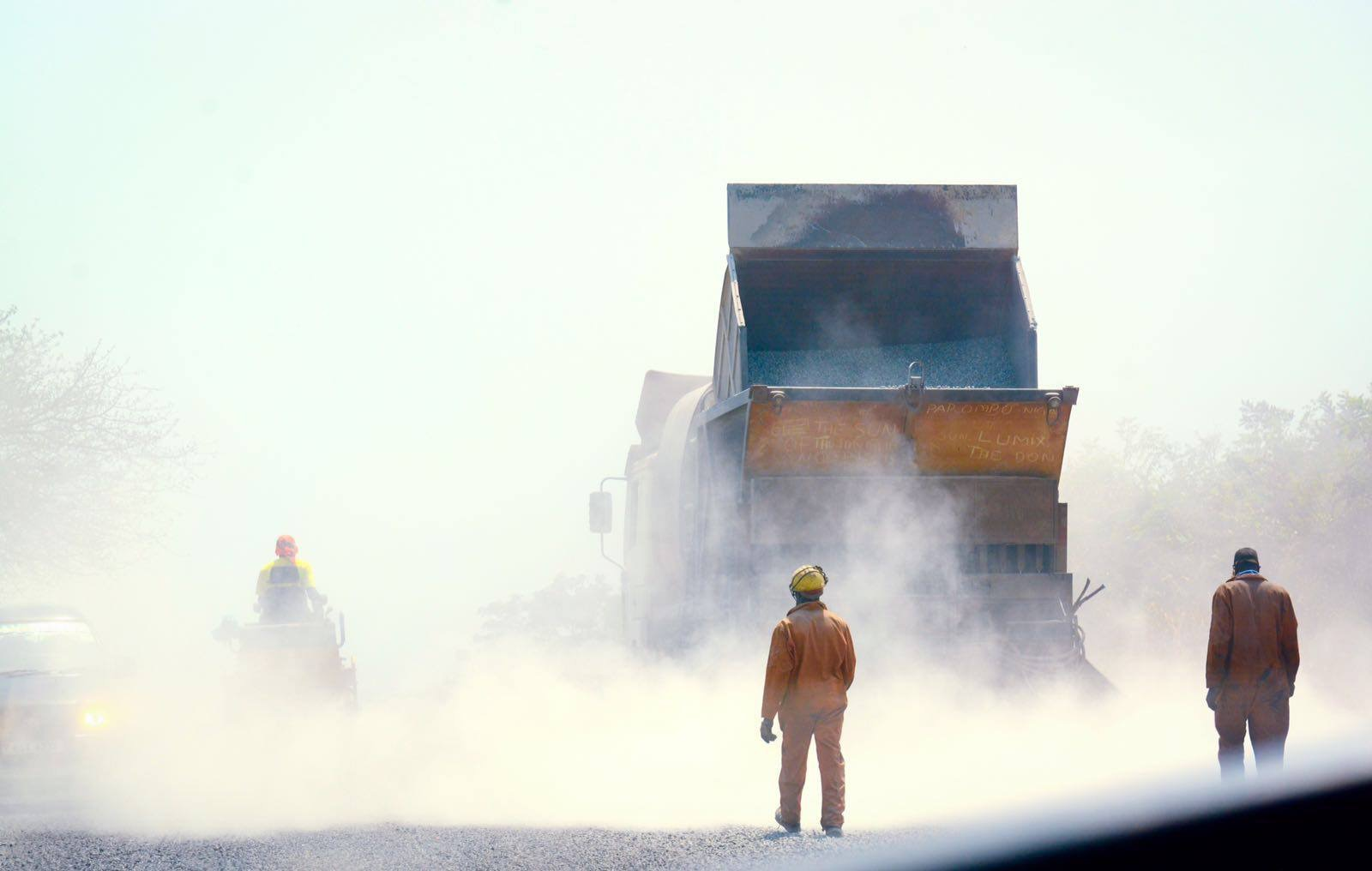
Gulu Highway construction near Karuma dam

Originally scheduled for commissioning in 2018, the plant was delayed 54 months. It was designed to bring units online in stages (starting with 200 MW), with electricity costs for consumers initially set at $0.049 per unit before dropping to $0.020 after 10 years.

The construction began on 12 August 2013. In March 2015, Sinohydro, the lead contractor on the project, hired Alstom to supply six 100 megawatt Francis turbines and related equipment in a US$65 million deal. At the time, it is expected that a total of 2,500 casual and permanent workers will be hired, which will grow to a peak of about 6,000 (mostly Ugandans). The power station is expected to be commissioned in 2018.

Progress advanced from 30% completion in 2016 to about 74–76% in 2018, and 80% by April 2019. By September 2019, construction reached roughly 95%, with most transmission lines nearly or fully completed.

=== Costs ===
The project has faced major delays and rising costs. Initially planned for completion in 60 months, the project has stretched to about 114 months, roughly a 4.5-year delay. This prolonged timeline has significantly increased expenses. The original budget of about $1.7 billion (SH$6.323 trillion) has climbed to roughly SH$8.18 trillion, with additional costs including about 113.9 billion shillings in accrued interest due to delayed payments.

Early estimates by Energy Infratech Private Limited, an Indian company, in 2011 put the Karuma Hydropower Project at about US$2.2 billion, including transmission lines from Karuma to locations where the power is integrated into the national power grid.

The project involves major high-voltage lines linking Karuma to Kawanda, Lira, and Olwiyo, with transmission costs around $250 million. The power generated is transmitted via high voltage wires to three substations as follows:

- a 264 kilometres (164 mi) 400 kilovolt line to Kawanda UETCL Substation in Wakiso District
- an 80 kilometres (50 mi) 132 kilovolt line to Lira and (c) a 60 kilometres (37 mi) 400 kilovolt line to a substation in Olwiyo, Nwoya District.

Construction began in 2013 under Sinohydro, and was expected to finish in five years. Funded largely by loans from the Export-Import Bank of China, which covered about 85% of costs. By 2018, the budget was revised to about US$1.7 billion, split between the power plant (US$1.4 billion) and transmission infrastructure (US$300 million).

== Recent developments ==
In addition to the high voltage transmission lines to Lira, Olwiyo and Kawanda, that belong to Uganda Electricity Transmission Company Limited (UETCL), Umeme, the largest national distributor will spend USh4 billion (US$1.1 million) to construct a network of 33kV lines from Karuma to Kigumba and on to the districts of Lira, Gulu, Masindi and Hoima. Commissioning of the power station had been moved to November 2020.

In May 2021, following a tour of the work site, the chairperson of the board of Uganda Electricity Generation Company Limited (UEGCL), Engineer Proscovia Margaret Njuki, set the date of commissioning as 22 June 2022. In June 2021 it was reported that 98.8 percent of the work was complete with the contractor having already addressed some of the works that did not conform with the plans and actively working on the rest.

In July 2022, the Daily Monitor reported that the power station would be brought online, one turbine at a time, with the first 100-MW unit starting in October 2022 and the sixth and final unit commissioned in June 2023. As of November 2023, with four of the six generators supplying power to the national grid, the remaining two turbines were expected to come online in 2024, with anticipated commercial commissioning planned for September 2024.

=== Commercial commissioning ===
The completed renewable energy infrastructure project underwent commercial commissioning on 26 September 2024, adding 600 MW of clean renewable power to the national gird.

== Lira–Gulu–Agago High Voltage Power Line ==
Lira–Gulu–Agago High Voltage Power Line

Location
- Country: Uganda
- Coordinates: 2.802500°N 32.304444°E
- General direction: South to North
- From: Lira, Uganda
- Passes through: Gulu
- To: Agago, Uganda

Ownership information
- Owner: Government of Uganda
- Operator: Uganda Electricity Transmission Company Limited

Construction information
- Expected: (Completion) 18 November 2023

Technical information
- Current type: AC
- Total length: 140 mi (230 km)
- AC voltage: 132kV
- No. of circuits: 2

The Lira–Gulu–Agago High Voltage Power Line is an operational 132kV high voltage power line in the Northern Region of Uganda.

=== Location ===
The 132 kilovolt power line would start at the 132 kV Uganda Electricity Transmission Company Limited (UETCL) substation at Lira. The line would travel in a general northeast direction to the city of Gulu, approximately 132 kilometres (82 mi) away, by road. From Gulu, the power line would travel in a general easterly direction for about 160 kilometres (99 mi), to end at Agago. The total distance traveled by the power line is estimated at approximately 230 kilometres (143 mi), since the line does not follow the road all the time.

=== Overview ===
This power line is intended to distribute electricity generated from power stations on the Victoria Nile to the Northern Region of Uganda. It is also intended to evacuate power from the Achwa Hydroelectricity Power Station Complex, including Achwa 2 Hydroelectric Power Station, under construction as of January 2018, and Achwa 3 Hydroelectric Power Station, under development. The main objective is to improve the quantity, quality and reliability of electricity supplied to the region.

=== Construction ===
As of June 2017, the website of the Electricity Regulatory Authority, stated that (a) preparation for implementation of the population resettlement plan were underway, (b) the updated feasibility study was in its final stages, (c) the pre-qualification of the contractors was ongoing and (d) the tender evaluation had been concluded. The scope of work involves the construction of a new 132kV electricity substation at Agago. In January 2016, the German government committed to lend €40 million, on soft terms, towards the construction of this power line.

The power line reached 100 percent construction and was energized on 18 November 2023. Commercial commissioning of the power line took place at the new Agago 132/33kV substation on 21 February 2024.

== See also ==
- Kiryandongo
- Uganda power stations
- Karuma–Kawanda Power Line
- Coca Codo Sinclair Dam
