= Electricity Regulatory Authority =

Ugandan government agency

Coordinates: 00°19′20″N 32°35′13″E

Agency overview
- Formed: 2000
- Jurisdiction: Uganda
- Headquarters: New ERA House 5C-1 Third Street, Lugogo Industrial Area Kampala, Uganda
- Agency executives: Chairperson, Grania Rosette Rubomboras; Chief Executive Officer, Ziria Tibalwa Waako
- Parent agency: Uganda Ministry of Energy, Oil and Mineral Development
- Website: Homepage

The Electricity Regulatory Authority (ERA) is a government agency that regulates, licenses, and supervises the generation, transmission, distribution, sale, export, and importation of electrical energy in Uganda.

== Location ==
The offices of the ERA are located in the New ERA House at 5C-1 Third Street, Lugogo Industrial Area, Kampala Central Division, in the country's capital city. The coordinates of New ERA House are 0°19'18.0"N 32°36'18.0"E (Latitude:0.321667; Longitude:32.605000).

== Overview ==
ERA was established in 2000, in accordance with the Electricity Act of 1999, as an agency of the Uganda Ministry of Energy, Oil and Mineral Development. This parastatal is governed by a five-member board, also known as the "Authority". The day-to-day affairs of the agency are supervised by the chief executive officer. Organizations and committees within the purview of the ERA include the Rural Electrification Board and the Electricity Consumer Committees.

== Operations ==
One of the responsibilities of the agency is the issuance of licenses to electricity wiremen in Uganda, who totaled nearly 2,000 as at November 2018. A member of the Authority also chairs a 5-person Installations Permit Committee, which is responsible for interviewing applicants for installation permits, processing of new permits, renewal of permits and undertaking disciplinary measures against permit holders who violate the terms and conditions of their permits.

== Governance ==
The authority is supervised by a board of directors, chaired by Grania Rosette Rubomboras. The chief executive officer of the authority is Engineer Ziria Tibalwa Waako.

== Recognition and awards ==
In December 2021, the annual African Development Bank’s 2021 Electricity Regulatory Index selected Uganda's electricity sector as the best-regulated on the African continent, for the fourth consecutive year. By extension, Uganda's Electricity Regulatory Authority is the best electricity sector regulator in Africa, for four years running, according to the AfDB.

== Developments ==
In February 2025, the ERA operationised Ugandan laws that allow for a manufacturer whose electricity requirements equal or exceed 1,500kVA to purchase electricity directly from the generation companies without going through an intermediary. If on the grid, up to 30 percent bulk purchases can be acquired that way. If off-grid the manufacturer can purchase up to 100 percent of its electricity needs directly from the power producer. The intention of the new regulations is to lower the electricity tariff for manufacturers from an average of US$0.068 per Kilowatt-hour in Q4 2024, to the desired US$0.050 per Kilowatt-hour in the future.

== See also ==
- Umeme
- Sarah Wasagali Kanaabi
- Irene Muloni
- Ruth Nankabirwa
- Energy in Uganda
- List of power stations in Uganda
- Electricity Regulatory Authority House
- Energy Regulators Association of East Africa
- Energy Regulation Centre of Excellence
