= Mityana–Bukuya–Kiboga Road =

Road in Uganda

Coordinates: 00°34′20″N 31°56′52″E

Myanzi–Kassanda–Bukuya–Kiboga Road

Route information
- Length: 48 mi (77 km)

Major junctions
- South end: Mityana
- Bulera; Kalangaalo; Bukuya
- North end: Kiboga

Location
- Country: Uganda

Highway system
- Roads in Uganda

The Mityana–Kalangaalo–Bukuya–Kiboga Road is a road in Uganda, connecting the towns of Mityana, and Kalangaalo in Mityana District, Bukuya in Mubende District, to Kiboga in Kiboga District.

== Location ==
The road starts at Mityana, on the Mityana–Mubende Road, in the center of Mityana town. It takes a north-westerly direction, through Bulera to Kalangaalo, approximately 26 kilometres (16 mi) from Mityana. From there, it continues in a north-westerly direction to Bukuya, a distance of about 19 kilometres (12 mi). From Bukuya, the road continues north-westwards to Kiboga, a distance of approximately 32.5 kilometres (20 mi).

== Overview ==
This road is an important transport corridor connecting Kiboga District, Mubende District, and Mityana District. The section between Bukuya and Kiboga is common to this road and to Myanzi–Kassanda–Bukuya–Kiboga Road. From Bukuya, the former lies nearly entirely in Mityana District, while the latter lies in Mubende District. Flooding is a challenge on these roads. The Mityana–Bukuya–Kiboga Road is a murram-surfaced road, in varying stages of disrepair, especially the section between Bulera and Kyamusisi.

== See also ==
- Uganda National Roads Authority
