= 2022–2023 Uganda Ebola outbreak =

Disease outbreak in East Africa

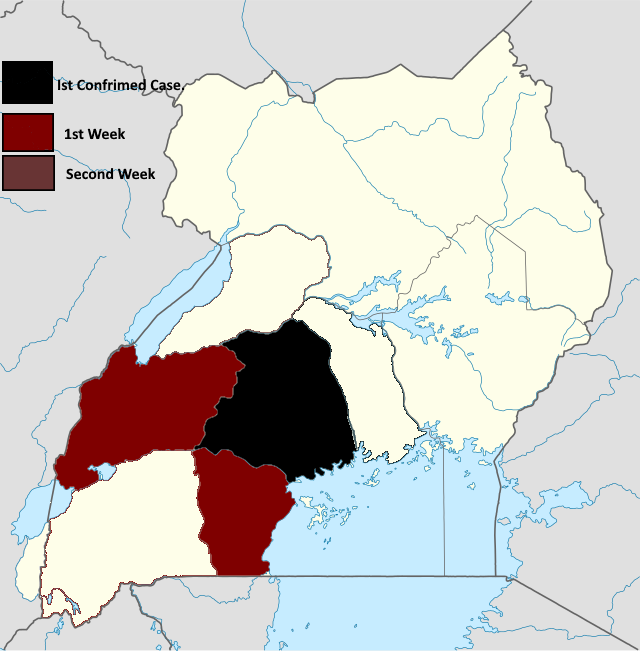
- Spread of Ebola in Uganda
- Disease: Ebola
- Pathogen: Sudan ebolavirus
- Location: Western Region and Central Region, Uganda
- Date: 20 September 2022 – 10 January 2023
- Confirmed cases: 164
- Deaths: 77

An outbreak of the Sudan ebolavirus from 20 September 2022 until 10 January 2023 in the Western and Central Regions of Uganda infected over 160 people and killed 77. It was Uganda's fifth outbreak with Sudan ebolavirus. The Ugandan Ministry of Health declared the outbreak on 20 September 2022. As of 25 October 2022, there were confirmed cases in the Mubende, Kyegegwa, Kassanda, Kagadi, Bunyanga, Kampala and Wakiso districts. As of 24 October 2022, there were a total of 90 confirmed or probable cases and 44 deaths. On 12 October, the first recorded death in the capital of Kampala occurred; 12 days later on 24 October, there had been a total of 14 infections in the capital in the last two days. On 11 January 2023 after 42 days without new cases the outbreak was declared over.

== Background ==
Uganda has previously had four outbreaks of Sudan ebolavirus; one outbreak in 2000 and 2011 and two outbreaks in 2012, as well as an outbreak of Bundibugyo virus disease in 2007 and an Ebola virus disease outbreak in 2019.

Date	Virus	Human cases	Human deaths	CFR	Description
Oct 2000–Jan 2001	SUDV	425	224	53%	Occurred in the Gulu, Masindi, and Mbarara districts of Uganda. The three greatest risks associated with Sudan virus infection were attending funerals of case-patients, having contact with case-patients in one's family, and providing medical care to case-patients without using adequate personal protective measures. Victims included Matthew Lukwiya.
Dec 2007–Jan 2008	BDBV	149	37	25%	Occurred in the Bundibugyo District in western Uganda. This was the first identification of the Bundibugyo virus (BDBV).
2011–Aug 2012	SUDV	32	22	69%	Occurred in the Kibaale District.

== Epidemiology ==
No human outbreaks of the Sudan ebolavirus have been reported in the last 10 years. Given that this is significantly longer than any reported case of persistent infection in human survivors of ebolavirus infection, this lends weight to the theory expressed by Kyobe Henry Bbosa, Ebola incident commander at Uganda's Ministry of Health, that this outbreak was caused by an unobserved spillover event from a wildlife reservoir. However, this putative spillover remains unidentified. The first cases were detected in the Mubende District among people living around a gold mine. Whilst the mobility of gold traders has been suggested to play a role in onward transmission from the site where the outbreak was first detected, no direct evidence of this has been forthcoming. As of 20 October, the eight most recent Ebola cases had no known contacts with known patients, suggesting incomplete contact tracing and unknown chains of transmission.As of 5 November, a total of 132 confirmed cases had been identified; 39% of confirmed cases died, a total of 61 patients with confirmed Ebola have recovered from illness and been discharged. Cases have been found in seven districts including Mubende, Kassanda District, Kyegegwa District, Bunyangabu District, Kagadi District, Wakiso District, and the capital of Kampala. As of 8 November, 23 Ebola cases had been confirmed among pupils, hence education minister Janet Kataha Museveni announced schools across Uganda would close 25 November, two weeks before the scheduled end of term.

=== Timeline ===
Mubende District in Uganda

On 11 September, the index case of the outbreak, a 24-year-old man in a village of the Mubende District developed symptoms of Ebola and died on 19 September.

On 20 September, the Ugandan health authorities declared an outbreak of Sudan ebolavirus in the Mubende District.

By 25 September, cases had been confirmed in Kyegegwa District and Kassanda District. On 29 September Kagadi District confirmed its first case.

On 30 September, there were 38 confirmed cases and eight total deaths in confirmed cases.

On 1 October, physician Mohammed Ali, one of six infected health workers who treated the index case, died as the first health worker.

On 2 October, there were 41 confirmed cases and nine total deaths in confirmed cases. Furthermore, the Bunyanga District had its first confirmed case.

On 5 October, there were 43 confirmed cases and 29 reported deaths.

On 10 October, there were 63 confirmed or suspected cases and 29 reported deaths.

On 12 October, the first confirmed case and death in the capital of Kampala occurred, although he was believed to have fled from an already infected district.

On 20 October, there were 60 confirmed cases and 44 reported deaths. On 22 October Wakiso District had confirmed its first case.

On 24 October, there were 90 confirmed cases and 28 confirmed deaths, with 14 confirmed cases reported in Kampala in the previous 48 hours.

On 26 October, the Ugandan Ministry of Health confirmed that there were 6 cases in school-aged children who attended classes at 3 different schools in the Rubaga Division of Kampala. One of the children died from the disease and 170 contacts were identified from these cases.

On 2 November Masaka District confirmed its first case and death after a 23-year-old woman came to Masaka from Kampala to be looked after by her parents and was admitted to a hospital on 31 October and later died after being transferred back to Kampala.

On 13 November Jinja District confirmed its first case and death after a 45-year-old man died and was linked to a probable case connected to the Rubaga Division of Kampala.

Districts	Cases	Deaths	Last update
Mubende District	64 + 19 probable	29 + 19 probable	11 January 2023
Kyegegwa District	4	1	11 January 2023
Kassanda District	49 + 2 probable	20 + 2 probable	11 January 2023
Kagadi District	1	1	11 January 2023
Bunyangabu District	1		11 January 2023
Kampala District	17	2	11 January 2023
Wakiso District	4		11 January 2023
Masaka District	1	1	11 January 2023
Jinja District	1 + 1 probable	1 + 1 probable	11 January 2023
Total	(142 confirmed + 22 probable) 164 Total	(55 confirmed + 22 probable) 77 Total	11 January 2023

== Response ==
According to Jane Aceng, Uganda's health minister, local people initially believed the new Ebola outbreak was caused by witchcraft. Aside from this misinformation, there are also no effective vaccines against the Sudan ebolavirus, and merely early supportive care is the best management option of an infected person, but experts are hopeful that much has been learned about infections with Ebola viruses, including diagnosis, contact tracing and how to improve survival. The World Health Organization (WHO) has been supporting the Ugandan Ministry of Health with surveillance, communication and coordination efforts. Similarly, Médecins Sans Frontières has been supporting the Ministry of Health with deploying initial emergency response.

The International Federation of Red Cross and Red Crescent Societies (IFRC) has appealed for emergency aid to Uganda. The European Union has responded to the request with €200,000 in initial emergency funding.

On 6 October, the United States announced that they would begin screening air passengers from Uganda for cases of Ebola.

According to Ana Maria Henao-Restrepo and her team in WHO's Health Emergencies Program, an adenovirus based vaccine developed by the Sabin Vaccine Institute in a partnership with the Vaccine Research Center at the US National Institute of Allergy and Infectious Diseases will be offered to contacts of known cases as part of a clinical trial.

On 15 October, the first lockdown came into effect. The lockdown, affecting the Mubende and Kassandra districts, prevents anyone, except cargo trucks, from leaving or entering the districts for three weeks. Furthermore, bars, nightclubs, places of worship and entertainment venues are closed and a curfew is in place.

On 17 October, president Museveni put Kampala under high response alert after two cases from Mubende reached the capital. One of the patients died. Museveni also warned that there had been contacts and risks of infections in the city.

The United States has sent the antiviral drug remdesivir and the experimental combination of antibodies MBP134 to Uganda to help protect healthcare workers from the outbreak with CDC-responsible Joel Montgomery saying that if healthcare workers are at risk, then it will negatively impact the response to the outbreak. Supply shortages, for example inadequate PPE, and limited food for those in quarantine have meant that patients and contacts have escaped isolation; interns have only been paid every three months, meaning they were unable to cope with the rising cost of living, all of which are important issues in the response to stem the epidemic.

== Transmission and virology ==
Ebola is mainly spread through contact with bodily fluids. The average case fatality rate of Ebola (all 4 viruses) is 50%. In this outbreak of Sudan Ebolavirus, the case fatality rate has been 39%.

== Misinformation ==
Some politicians and other public figures opposed to the 36-year rule of President Yoweri Museveni declared that the Ebola outbreak was fake or exaggerated, and that Ugandans were being used as vaccine "lab rats" to enrich the ruling party. Individuals such as former presidential candidate Joseph Kabuleta further claimed that the Ebola vaccines undergoing clinical trial may have deadly side effects, similar to his earlier claims about COVID-19 vaccines. Other popularized theories have included that Ebola is caused by witchcraft and that burials of Ebola victims are closed so that their organs can be harvested and sold.A contributing factor in misinformation campaigns has been what researchers observed to be uneven application of public health measures during the COVID-19 pandemic, used by the ruling party to stifle dissent and shut down public discourse. An independent fact-checking organization in Uganda has found that a lack of community education regarding disease spread is more widespread than "targeted misinformation", which Ugandan Health Minister Margaret Muhanga had cited, saying opposition politicized the Ebola outbreak.

Citizens also expressed fears of heavy-handed lockdowns at a time when the economy was still struggling with the fallout from nationwide COVID-19 lockdowns and ongoing global inflationary pressures. Museveni locked down Mubende and Kassanda districts on 15 October, one month after the first case was reported, but promised no national lockdowns akin to those deployed for COVID-19, even when the virus had spread to Kampala and killed upwards of 77 people in the capital. In the districts undergoing lockdown, markets, bars, and churches were to be closed for the duration of the lockdown, together with travel bans and dawn-to-dusk curfews. Some citizens claimed that the districts placed under lockdown were being deliberately punished for their support of opposition politician Bobi Wine and that police had beaten locals to enforce overnight curfews.
