= Kabuye Frank Kibirige =

Ugandan politician (born 1997)

Kabuye Frank Kibirige Honorable
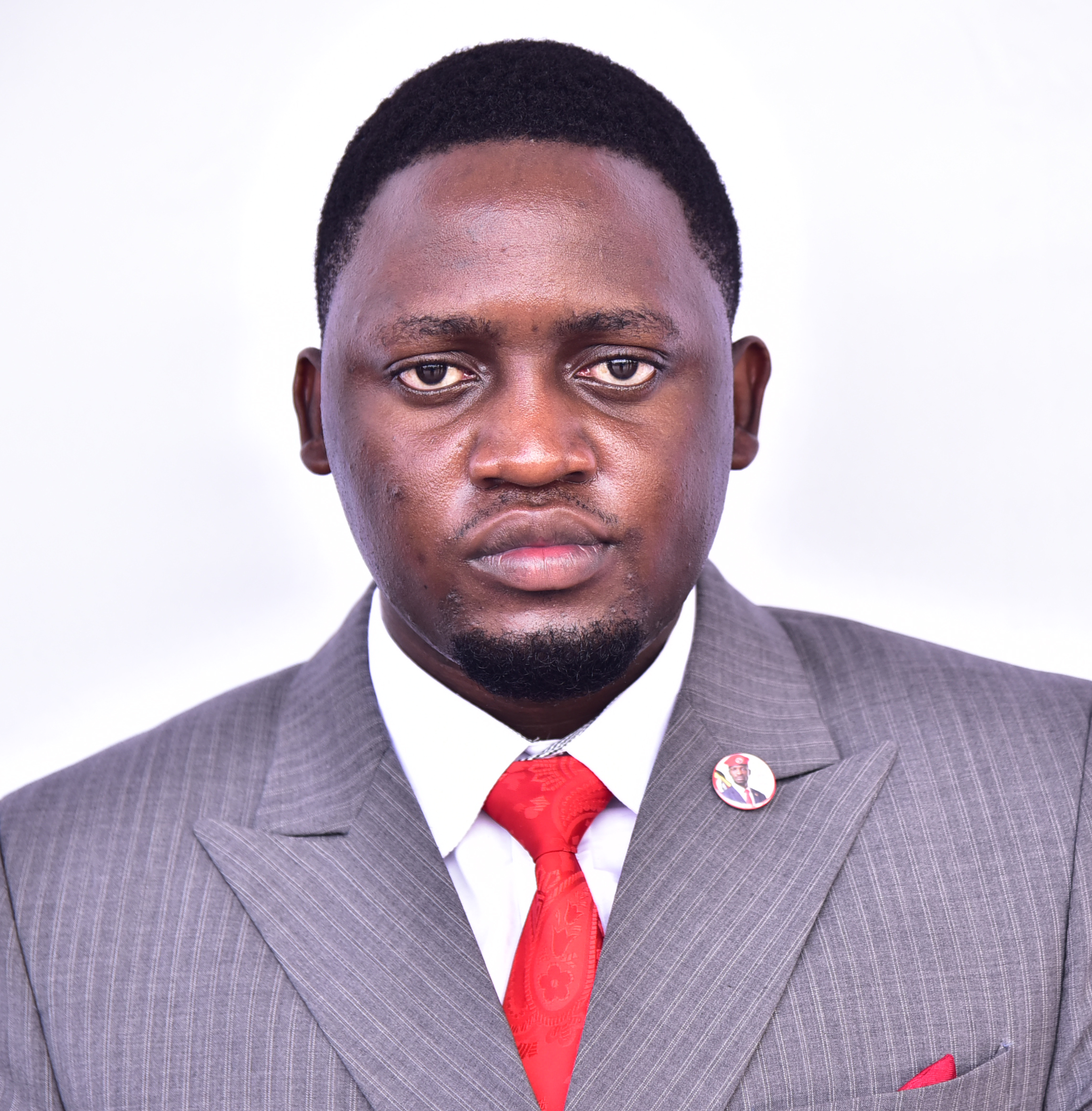
- Kabuye Frank.jpg

Member of Parliament for Kasanda South Constituency
- Incumbent
- Assumed office 2021

Personal details
- Born: October 24, 1997 Mityana District, Uganda
- Party: National Unity Platform
- Education: Makerere University (Bachelor's degree in Business Statistics)
- Occupation: Politician, Farmer, Humanitarian, Businessman

Kabuye Frank Kibirige is a Ugandan politician, farmer, humanitarian and businessman. He is a member of parliament for Kasanda South constituency in Kasanda District, in Uganda's Central Region in the 11th parliament of the Republic of Uganda. He is the deputy youth leader for greater Mubende under the People Power movement in National Unity Platform political party.

== Early life and education ==
Kabuye Frank Kibirige was born on October 24, 1997, at Mityana hospital by the help of the mid-wife Nansamba Margret in Mityana District currently Kasanda District in a village called Kyakatebe.

Kibirige attended Kyakatebe Primary School but attained his Primary Leaving Examination Certificate in 2010 from Fremma Day and Boarding Primary School in Mityana District. He then attended Mityana Modern Secondary School where he attained his Uganda Certificate of Education in 2014 as well as Lubiri Senior Secondary School, where he attained his Uganda Advanced Certificate of Education in 2016. He then attended Makerere University in Kampala, where he studied business statistics, graduating with a bachelor's degree on May 5, 2022. As of 2023, Kabuye was pursuing a master's degree in Business Statistics at Makerere University.

== Political career ==
In June 2018, Kibirige declared his intention to run for parliament in Kasanda South Constituency after the constituency’s member, Ssimewo Nsubuga of the National Resistance Movement had introduced a bill to amend the constitution to remove the age limit on the office of president, allowing Yoweri Museveni to remain in office.

In 2020, he announced his candidacy for the 2021 General election and was nominated on the National Unity Platform (NUP) card in Kasanda South. On 16 January 2021, Kabuye was elected, defeating incumbent Nsubuga. Kibirige took office on 18 May of the same year.

On 10 June 2021, he was elected as the Shadow Minister and Children Affairs for the greater Mubende.

== Arrest ==
On July 14, 2022, police arrested Kabuye Frank Kibirige for his alleged involvement in the death of a student of Makerere University during the Makerere Guild elections. It was alleged that during the election campaigns that turned violent which led to the stabbing of the student by unknown persons, Kabuye Frank was around Makerere University and he was arrested to help police get more information about the incident. He was later released on bond as investigations move on.

== See also ==
- Thomas Tayebwa
- Robert Kyagulanyi
- Joel Ssenyonyi
