= Mityana–Sekanyonyi–Busunju Road =

Road in Uganda

Coordinates: 00°30′04″N 32°08′21″E

Route information
- Length: 18 mi (29 km)

Major junctions
- South end: Mityana
- Sekanyonyi
- North end: Busunju

Location
- Country: Uganda

Highway system
- Roads in Uganda

Mityana–Sekanyonyi–Busunju Road is a road in Uganda, connecting the towns of Mityana, Sekanyonyi and Busunju in Mityana District.

== Location ==
The road starts in the center of Mityana town, on the Mityana–Mubende Road. It proceeds north, first following the route of the Mityana–Bukuya–Kiboga Road. Then, after crossing the railroad tracks of the Kampala–Kasese Railway about 3 kilometres (2 mi), north of Mityana, this road makes a sharp right turn, continuing north-eastwards through Sekanyonyi before ending at Busunju on the Kampala–Hoima Road, a total distance of about 29 kilometres (18 mi).

== Overview ==
This road is an important transportation link between the Kampala to Hoima and the Kampala to Fort Portal transport corridors. As at June 2016, the road is murram-surfaced. Yoweri Museveni, during his re-election campaign in January 2016, mentioned this road as one of those planned for upgrade to class II bitumen standard.

== See also ==
- Uganda National Roads Authority
