= Bukuya =

- Location in Uganda
- Coordinates: 00°40′28″N 31°50′05″E
- Country: Uganda
- Region: Central Region
- District: Kassanda District

Bukuya is a town in the Kassanda District in the Central Region of Uganda.

== Location ==
Bukuya is about 73 kilometres (45 mi) north-east of Mubende, the location of the district headquarters. This is approximately 31 kilometres (19 mi) south-east of Kiboga in Kiboga District, the nearest large town. Bukuya is approximately 125 kilometres (78 mi) north-west of Kampala, Uganda's capital city. The coordinates of the town are 0°40'28.0"N, 31°50'05.0"E (Latitude:0.674454; Longitude:31.834716).

== Overview ==
The Myanzi–Kassanda–Bukuya–Kiboga Road passes through the middle of town. Bukuya Primary School (BPS) is an elementary school in Bukuya town. BPS is linked with St. Martin's Church of England Primary School, in East End, Newbury, Berks, United Kingdom. The two schools exchange teachers.

== See also ==
- List of cities and towns in Uganda
