= Lugogo River =

River in Uganda

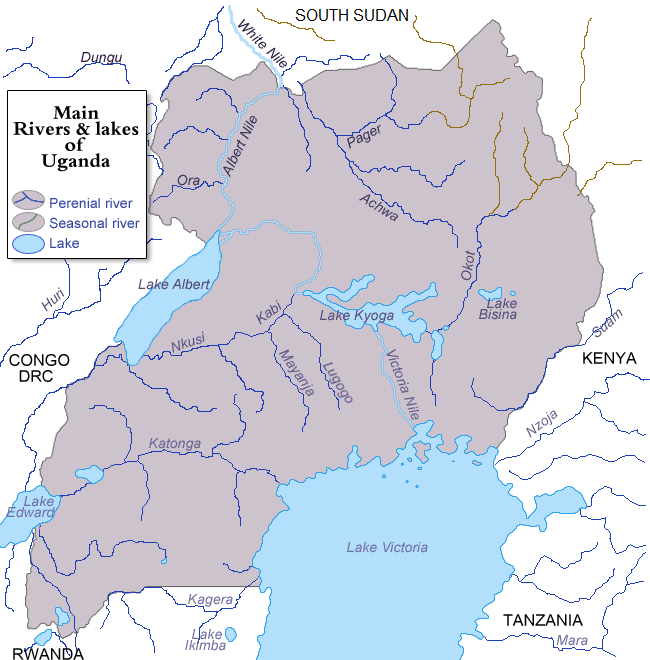
Rivers and lakes of Uganda with the Lugogo River (center)

The Lugogo River is a river located in Uganda in the eastern region of Africa. It is located in the central part of the country and flows in a south easterly direction from the Kabi River and pours it water into Lake Kyoga basin.

The river has been a subject to diversion by excavation work related to the construction of a Chinese Agro-industrial park, which has impacted water supplies for local residents. In 2024, local residents complained of pollution to the river and the wetland that feeds it from the runoff of a local sugar factory. Lugogo river is notable for its proximity to the Ziwa Rhino Sanctuary and for its seasonal flooding, which can impact local communities and infrastructure. It is also an extensive part of the Nile River system.

The Lugogo River is one of the several rivers (including the Mayanja and Ssezibwa rivers) in the region that experiences significant seasonal flooding, often disrupting local road networks and agricultural land.

== See also ==
- River Ayago
- River Bujuku
- River Enyau
- River Katonga
- River Lwajjali
- River Mayanja
- River Nkusi
- River Okot
- River Semliki
- River Sezibwa
- Rutshuru River
- River Rwizi
