= Okot River =

River in Uganda

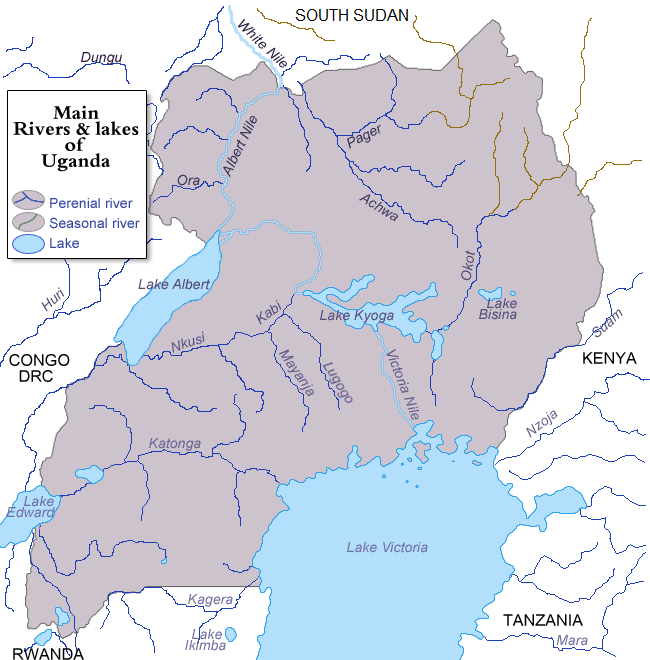
Rivers and lakes of Uganda

The Okot River is a river of eastern Uganda in eastern Africa. It flows generally in a southern and south-westerly direction and, is a tributary, with in the large drainage basin and reaches Lake Kyoga.

== See also ==
- River Kafu
- Kagera River
- Katonga River
- Kazinga Channel
- Kidepo River
- Lamia River
- Lugogo River
- Lwajjali River
- River Manafwa
- Mayanja River
- River Muzizi
- Muzizi River
