= Butebi, Uganda =

Butebi
- Map of Uganda showing location of Butebi
- Coordinates: 00°20′44″N 32°00′04″E
- Country: Uganda
- Region: Central Region
- Sub-region: Buganda
- Districts: Mityana District
- Time zone: UTC+3 (EAT)

Butebi is a village in Mityana District, in the Central Region of Uganda.

== Location ==
Butebi is located in Nakibanga Parish, Busimbi sub-county, Ssingo County, in Mityana District. This is approximately 10.5 kilometres (7 mi), by road, south-west of the town of Mityana, the largest town in the district and the location of the district headquarters. The geographical coordinates of the village are 0°20'44.0"N, 32°00'04.0"E (Latitude:0.345556; Longitude:32.001111).

== Overview ==
Butebi lies close to the north-eastern shores of Lake Wamala.

The biggest trading center that serves the residents of Butebi is called Nakibanga. Also notable overview is the famous 4O Trees Resort Hotel and Camping Site located in Nakibanga - Mityana

== Notable people ==
Butebi is the birth place of Francis Zaake, the member of parliament representing Mityana Municipality, in the 10th Ugandan parliament (2016–2021).

DJ Erycom is also born in Butebi Nakibanga village.
