= Myanzi–Kassanda–Bukuya–Kiboga Road =

Road in Uganda

Coordinates: 00°36′53″N 31°50′09″E

Route information
- Length: 40.5 mi (65.2 km)

Major junctions
- South end: Myanzi
- Kassanda; Bukuya
- North end: Kiboga

Location
- Country: Uganda

Highway system
- Roads in Uganda

The Myanzi–Kassanda–Bukuya–Kiboga Road is a road in Uganda, connecting the towns of Myanzi, Kassanda and Bukuya in Mubende District, to Kiboga in Kiboga District.

== Location ==
The road starts at Myanzi, on the Mityana–Mubende Road, about 16.5 kilometres (10 mi) west of Mityana. From there, it takes a northwesterly route to Kassanda, a distance of about 18 kilometres (11 mi). From Kassanda, the road turns northwards to Bukuya, a distance of about 15 kilometres (9 mi). From Bukuya, the road turns northwestwards and continues to Kiboga, a distance of approximately 32.5 kilometres (20 mi).

== Overview ==
This road is an important transport corridor between Kiboga District and Mubende District. The road is prone to flooding, and when it does, it disrupts travel between the two districts and between those two and Mityana District.

== Upgrading to bitumen ==
The gravel-surfaced road is under the purview of Uganda National Roads Authority. During his 2016 presidential electoral campaigns, President Yoweri Museveni made a pledge to upgrade this road to class II bitumen standard.

== See also ==
- Uganda National Roads Authority
