= Myanzi =

- Location in Uganda; Placement on map is approximate
- Coordinates: 00°15′30″N 31°30′18″E
- Country: Uganda
- Region: Central Uganda
- District: Mubende District
- Municipality: Myanzi
- County: Buweekula
- Elevation: 3,957 ft (1,206 m)

Myanzi is a small town in the Central Region of Uganda.

== Location ==
Myanzi is in Kassanda District on the Mityana–Mubende Road, approximately 17 kilometres (11 mi), by road, west of Mityana, the nearest large town. The coordinates of Myanzi are 0°26'15.0"N, 31°54'38.0"E (Latitude:0.437501; Longitude:31.910547). The town sits at an average elevation of 1,206 metres (3,957 ft) above sea level.

== Overview ==
The Myanzi–Kassanda–Bukuya–Kiboga Road meets the Mityana–Mubende Road at a T-junction in the middle of town.

== See also ==
- Mityana–Mubende Road
- Myanzi–Kassanda–Bukuya–Kiboga Road
