= Kiboga General Hospital =

- Uganda Ministry of Health

Geography
- Location: Kiboga, Kiboga District, Central Region, Uganda
- Coordinates: 00°54′43″N 31°46′35″E

Organisation
- Care system: Public
- Type: General

Services
- Emergency department: I
- Beds: 210

History
- Founded: 1960

Links
- Other links: Hospitals in Uganda

Kiboga General Hospital, also Kiboga Hospital, Kiboga Main Hospital or Kiboga District Hospital, is a hospital in the Central Region of Uganda.

== Location ==
The hospital is located on the Kampala–Hoima Road, in the central business district of the town of Kiboga, about 79 kilometres (49 mi) southeast of Hoima Regional Referral Hospital, in the city of Hoima.

This is about 120 kilometres (75 mi) northwest of Mulago National Referral Hospital, in Kampala, Uganda's capital city. The coordinates of Kiboga General Hospital are:0°54'43.0"N, 31°46'35.0"E (Latitude:0.911937; Longitude:31.776378).

== Overview ==
Kiboga Hospital first opened at a different location in the town, as a dispensary and maternity unit in 1960. Following lobbying by the area member of parliament, construction began at the present suite for a fully fledged hospital in the late 1960s. The present hospital complex was commissioned in 1973. The hospital serves parts of the following districts: Kiboga, Kyankwanzi, Kibaale, Nakaseke, Mubende, and Hoima The hospital, whose bed capacity is 210, is severely understaffed, underfunded and operates with old antiquated equipment.

== See also ==
- List of hospitals in Uganda
