= Sekanyonyi =

Settlement in Central Region, Uganda

- Location in Uganda
- Coordinates: 00°32′47″N 32°04′50″E
- Country: Uganda
- Region: Central Region
- Sub-Region: Buganda
- District: Mityana District

Sekanyonyi, is a settlement in Mityana District, in the Central Region of Uganda.

== Location ==
The town is on the Mityana–Sekanyonyi–Busunju Road, about 19 kilometres (12 mi) north-east of Mityana. where the district headquarters are located. Sekanyonyi is about 12 kilometres (7 mi) south-west of Busunju on the Kampala–Hoima Road. The coordinates of Sekanyoni are 0°30'07.0"N, 32°08'19.0"E (Latitude:0.501951; Longitude:32.138608).

== Overview ==
The Mityana–Sekanyonyi–Busunju Road passes through the middle of town.

== See also ==
- Mityana–Sekanyonyi–Busunju Road
