= Mityana–Mubende Road =

Road in Uganda

Coordinates: 00°26′50″N 31°41′25″E

Route information
- Length: 50 mi (80 km)

Major junctions
- East end: Mityana
- Myanzi; Kawungera; Kitenga
- West end: Mubende

Location
- Country: Uganda

Highway system
- Roads in Uganda

The Mityana–Mubende Road is a road in the Central Region of Uganda, connecting the towns of Mityana, in Mityana District and Mubende in Mubende District.

== Location ==
The road starts at Mityana and travels westwards through Myanzi, Kawungera and Kitenga, to end at Mubende, a distance of about 81 kilometres (50 mi).

== Overview ==
This road is an important transport corridor between Mubende District and Mityana District. This road is part of the Kampala–Mityana–Mubende–Fort Portal transport corridor and is part of the East African road network, connecting Kenya, Uganda and DR Congo. The road is the primarily transport route for tourists to Kibaale National Park.

== Upgrading to bitumen ==
This road was upgraded to class II bituminous standard prior to 2008. (Note: The author was the Cabinet Minister of Works and Transport at the time.)

In April 2021, Energo Project Company Uganda Limited was contracted by the Uganda National Roads Authority, at a cost of UGX:396 billion (approx. US$105 million), to widen the road from 10 metres (33 ft) to 11 metres (36 ft), with 2 metres (6 ft 7 in) shoulders, drainage channels and culverts and a strengthened road base. The surface is to be improved to asphalt-concrete. The total distance to be worked on is reported as 86 kilometres (53 mi).

Under the same contract, the same road builder was contracted to tarmac an estimated 14 kilometres (9 mi) of Mityana Town urban roads. The work is expected to continue until April 2024. This is then expected to be followed by the 12 months of contactor defects liability period.

== See also ==
- Mityana–Bukuya–Kiboga Road
- Myanzi–Kassanda–Bukuya–Kiboga Road
- Uganda National Roads Authority
