= Francis Zaake =

Ugandan businessman and politician

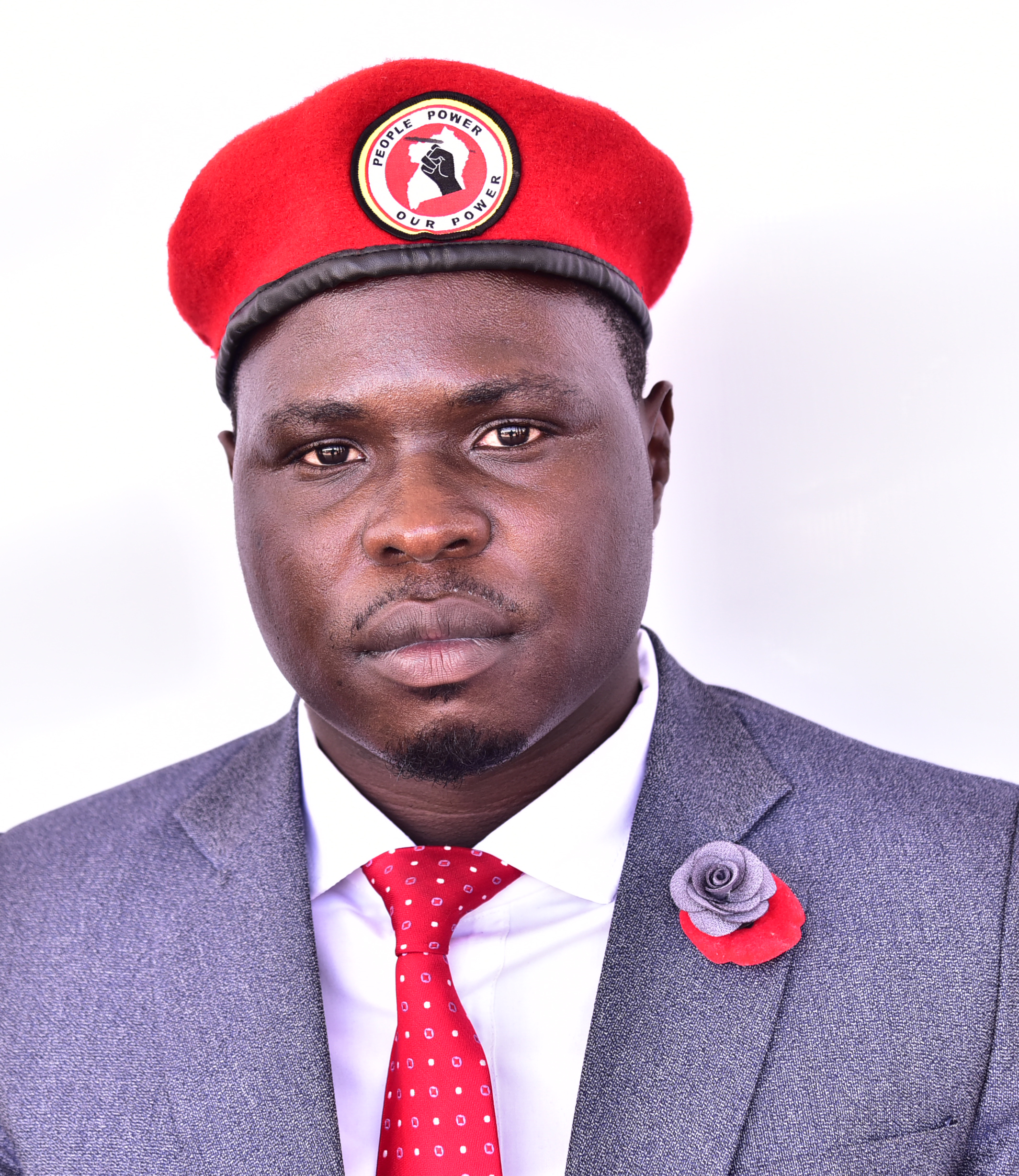
- Born: 12 January 1991 (age 35); Mityana, Uganda
- Education: Ndejje University; (Bachelor of Procurement and Logistics Management)
- Occupation: Politician
- Years active: 2016–present
- Known for: Member of Parliament
- Title: Commissioner of the 11th Parliament Parliament of Uganda

Francis Zaake (born 12 January 1991) is a businessman and Member of the 12th Parliament of Uganda representing Mityana Municipality. He was first elected to Parliament in the 2016 general elections as an Independent Member. In late 2020, he crossed to the National Unity Platform (NUP), Uganda's leading opposition Party. He ran for MP in Mityana Municipality in January 2021 on the NUP ticket and won a second term. Then, until his removal by the parliament in March 2022, he served as a Commissioner of Parliament, representing the entire Opposition on the highest decision-making body of the Ugandan Parliament

== Early life and education ==
Zaake was born on 12 January 1991 in Butebi village, Mityana District to Emmanuel Ssembuusi Butebi and Teddy Naluyima. He is the first born in a family of 12 children (eight girls and four boys). Zaake attended Fairway Primary School, in Mityana, where he obtained a Primary Leaving Examinations (PLE) Certificate in 2006. He then studied at Mityana Modern Secondary School, graduating with a Uganda Certificate of Education (UCE) in 2010. In 2012, he obtained a Uganda Advanced Certificate of Education from Merryland High School in Entebbe. He later joined Ndejje University where he graduated with a Bachelor's Degree in Procurement and Logistics Management.

== Political career ==
While at Ndejje University, in Luweero District, Zaake was elected Guild President of the university student body for the academic year 2015/2016(and contested for the MP seat at the same time), his final year at university. He is one of the politicians in the People Power Campaign led by fellow member of parliament Robert Kyagulanyi Ssentamu.

In the days leading up to the parliamentary by-elections for Arua Municipality, that were conducted on 15 August 2018, Francis Zaake was severely injured when he was assaulted by members of Uganda's police and military. He sought specialized medical care in India, as a result of the injuries that he sustained at the hands of Uganda's security forces.

As part of the melee that ensued in Arua on the night of 13 August 2018, thirty four individuals were arrested and one of MP Kyagulanyi's drivers, one Yasin Kawuma was shot to death.

In September 2018, Zaake was charged with treason, while he was still bed-ridden from his injuries.

In April 2020, police arrested Zaake after he distributed food to his neighbors. Police said the MP had flouted measures and guidelines of the COVID-19 national task force, led by Prime Minister Ruhakana Rugunda, on food distribution to the vulnerable people.

Zaake was elected for the third term in the twelfth Parliament of Uganda as the Member of Parliament for Mityana Municipality on 15th January 2026.

Parliament of Uganda officially name Zaake as the Chairperson of the Committee on Government Assurance and Implementation chairing with Anna Adeke Ebaju where the former speaker Anita Among was also designated to as the member of the committee.
