= Patrick Nsamba Oshabe =

Ugandan politician (born 1980)

Honorable Patrick Nsamba Oshabe
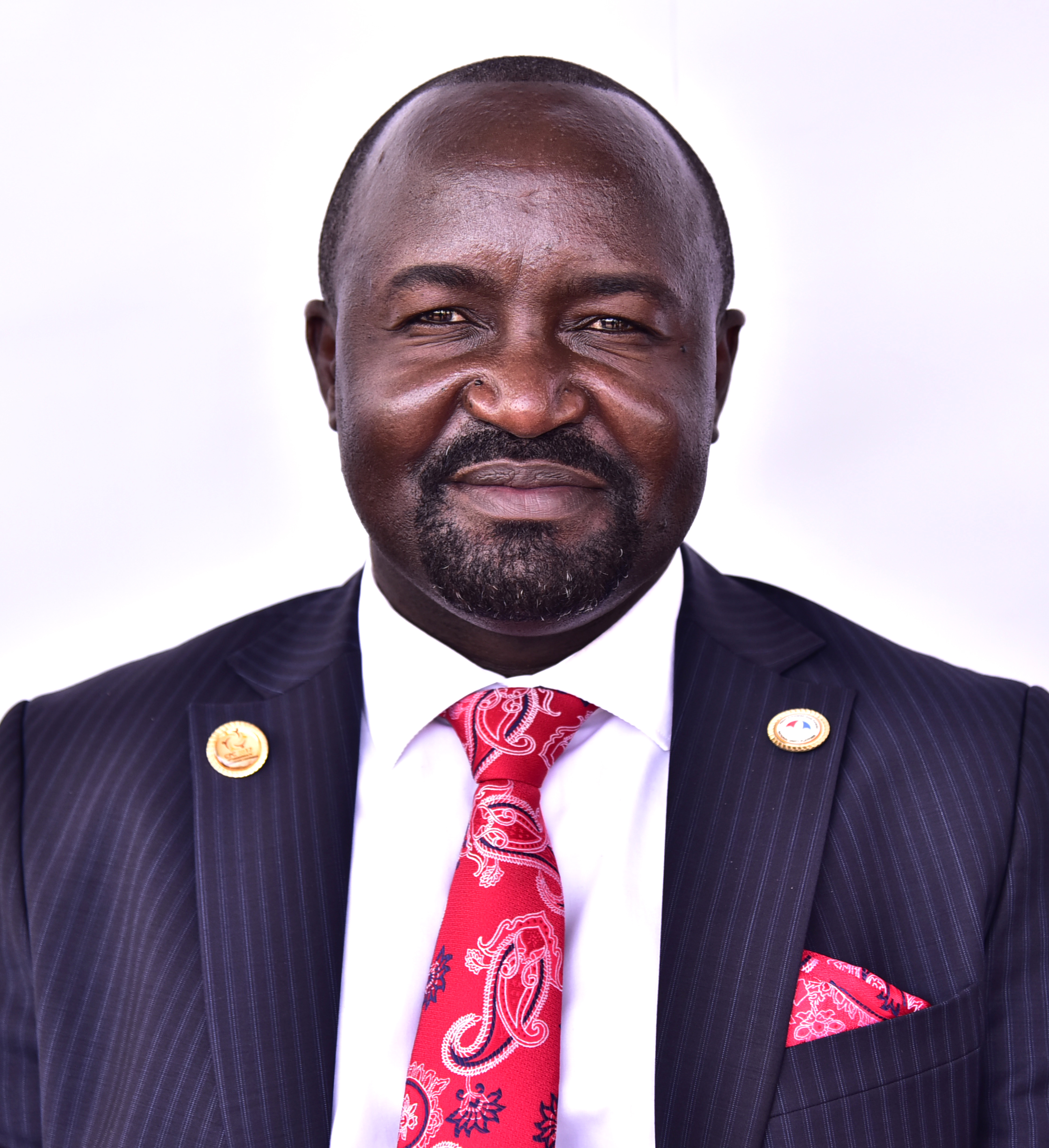
- Oshabe in 2020

Elected member of the National Assembly
- In office 2016–2021
- Constituency: Kassanda (constituency)
- In office 2016–2026

Personal details
- Born: Uganda
- Party: National Unity Platform
- Education: Makerere University

Patrick Nsamba Oshabe (born 14 April 1980) is a Ugandan politician and Member of Parliament for Kassanda North Constituency. He was born in Mubende district. He was elected to the position in January 2021 under the National Unity Platform. Previously, he served as MP under NRM.

== Early life and education ==
Nsamba studied at Kikandwa UMEA Primary School in Mubende District, and Mityana Secondary School for both O and A-Levels. He attained a Bachelor of Arts in Economics and Philosophy from Makerere University and later obtained a Master of Arts in Ethics and Public Management.

He is a Development Management Consultant who also attained a Certificate in Conflict Resolution and Development and a Diploma in Development Management from Open University, UK.

== Career ==
Nsamba is the current Member of Parliament representing Kassanda North Constituency. He sits on Committee on Education and Sports in the 11th Parliament. He is also a member of the Pan African Parliament, the legislative body of the African Union located in Midrand, South Africa.

He was one of the NRM rebel MPs and headed the team of six legislators who were to table a motion urging the government to constitute a Constitutional Review Commission that would prepare an omnibus Constitution Amendment Bill which was defeated by the majority party members. He then quitted the party and joined the then People Power movement in 2019 which later became NUP. In 2021 after the general elections, he was among the top five MPs who were considered to be appointed as the Leader of Opposition for the 11 Parliament. He contested again in 2026 for the Kasanda North constituency Parliamentary seat as the National Unity Platform flag bearer and won .His opponent Isaac Kamulegeya the NRM flag bearer applied for vote recount which court later dissmised upholding Nsamba the duly elected member of parliament for Kasanda North Constituency.

== Controversy ==
Nsamba was petitioned by his opponent in the January 2026 parliamentary elections for a vote recount, a case he won after the Mubende Magistrate court passed a ruling dismissing the petition due to insufficiency evidence.

== See also ==
- Joel Ssenyonyi
- Mathias Mpuuga
- Thomas Tayebwa
- Muwada Nkunyingi
- Parliament of Uganda
- Anita Among
