= Kyankwanzi =

- Location in Uganda
- Coordinates: 01°12′00″N 31°48′00″E
- Country: Uganda
- Region: Central Uganda
- District: Kyankwanzi District
- Elevation: 3,900 ft (1,200 m)
- Postal code: p.O.Bix 90 Kiboga
- Website: www.kyankwanzi.go.ug

Kyankwanzi is a District in Buganda Region of Uganda. It is one of the major political and economic centres of Kyankwanzi District and the district headquarters are located in Butemba Town Council.

== Location ==
Kyankwanzi Town in Kyankwanzi District, Uganda, is located on Bukwiri-Kyankwanzi-Bukomero Road, 25 km off Kampala-Hoima Road. By road, it is approximately 175 kilometres (109 mi) from the capital Kampala, and is connected with nearby towns of Butemba to the west, Bukomero to the southeast, and Kiboga about 55 kilometres (34 mi) to the south via Bukwiri on Kampala-Hoima Road. The coordinates of the town are:01 12 00N, 31 48 00E (Latitude:1.2000; Longitude:31.8000).

== Overview ==
Kyankwanzi is situated along the "cattle corridor," heavily inhabited by the cattle-keeping Banyankole and Banyarwanda residents. As such, Kyankwanzi has long been known to the public as the location of the National Leadership Institute (NALI), a government institute, established here because of the history of the Ugandan Bush War by the National Resistance Movement to train national leaders in the public service, military, government security organs and willing members of the populace. When the Act of Parliament ordered inception of a new district in Kiboga North County, formerly part of Kiboga District, the town became the eponym of the district because of people's historical association of the place with the region. The Kyankwanzi District Headquarters' seat is rather in Butemba Town, located closer to Kampala-Hoima Road.

== Points of interest ==
The following points of interest lie within the town limits or near its borders:

- The offices of Kyankwanzi Town Council
- Kyankwanzi Central Market
- National Leadership Institute (NALI) - An institute for training national leaders in public service, the military and state security organs. It started with President Museveni's National Resistance Army, present-day Uganda People's Defence Force, when it embarked on armed rebellions to attack the Obote administration in 1981, commonly known as Ugandan Bush War of 1981- 1986.
- Beatrice Secondary School Kyankwanzi - A secondary school with sponsors from Switzerland

== See also ==
- Kyankwanzi District
- Central Region, Uganda
- Luwero Triangle
