= Katonga Wildlife Reserve =

Wildlife reserve in Uganda

- IUCN category III (natural monument or feature)
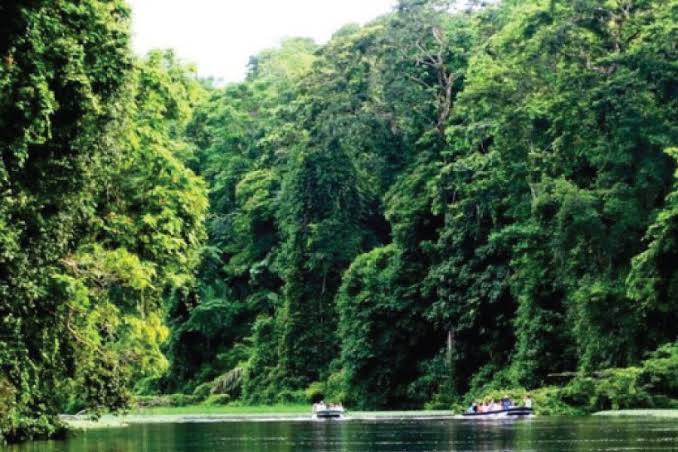

- Location within Uganda
- Location: Uganda
- Nearest city: Ibanda
- Coordinates: 0°14′26″N 30°46′51″E
- Area: 211 km^{2} (81 mi^{2})
- Established: 1998
- Governing body: Uganda Wildlife Authority

The Katonga Wildlife Reserve is a wildlife reserve in western Uganda, along the banks of the Katonga River. The reserve was established in 1998 and has approximately 211 square kilometres (81 mi^{2}). Many of the species of plants and animals in the reserve are unique to its wetland environment. Additionally, the grass species at Katonga Wildlife Reserve include Star grass, Bermuda grass, and Rhodes grass.

== Katonga River ==
The reserve is named after the Katonga River, which primarily flows from the swamps southwest of Lake Wamala towards Lake Victoria in the east, with lesser periodic flows from those same swamps to Lake George in the west.

== Location ==
The reserve is located in the Ibanda and Kamwenge Districts in western Uganda. In Kamwenge, it borders with the Biguli subcounty and part of the Mpara subcounty in Kyenjojo District. The reserve is approximately 200 kilometres (120 mi), by road, west of Kampala, Uganda's capital city. The coordinates of the wildlife reserve are 00 02N, 30 25E.

The signposted junction for Katonga is Kyegegwa, which lies on Fort Portal Road, 42 km west of Mubende. From there, a 40 km dirt road heads south to the entrance gate via Mparo and Kalwreni. Kalwreni lies 7 km from the entrance gate. It is also possible to approach Katonga from Kibale National Park via Kamwenge and Ibanda.

== Vegetation ==
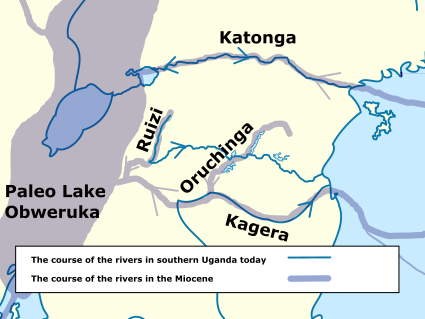
Map of Katonga River

The vegetation of the reserve is mixed savannah with acacia scrubland or woodlands. A large portion of the reserve is either permanent or seasonal wetlands. There are also pockets of riverine and tropical forest.

== Wildlife ==
There are over forty animal species and over 150 bird species within the reserve. The wildlife species within the reserve include:

- Sitatunga
- Reedbuck
- Waterbuck
- Warthog
- Bushbuck
- Colobus monkey
- Elephant
- Otter

The reserve is best explored on foot or by river canoe. The Uganda Wildlife Authority maintains a camping site with guides and a restaurant within the reserve.
