= Kibirige =

Kibirige is a surname. Notable people with the surname include:

- Bulaimu Muwanga Kibirige (1953–2021), Ugandan businessman
- Kabuye Frank Kibirige (born 1997), Ugandan politician
- Zach Kibirige (born 1994), English rugby union player
