= Lugogo =

Lugogo may refer to:

- Lugogo, Kampala, a neighborhood in Kampala, Uganda's capital
- Lugogo Channel, a wetland in Kampala, drains into Lake Victoria
- Lugogo River, a river of Uganda
- Lugogo Stadium, a stadium in Kampala, Uganda
- The ring name of the American professional wrestler David Sammartino
