= Kyankwanzi District =

- District
- District location in Uganda
- Coordinates: 01°12′N 31°48′E
- Country: Uganda
- Region: Central Region
- Established: 1 July 2010
- Capital: Kyankwanzi

Area
  - Land: 2,455.3 km^{2} (948.0 sq mi)
- Elevation: 1,200 m (3,900 ft)

Population (2012 estimate)
  - Total: 182,900
  - Density: 74.5/km^{2} (193/sq mi)
- Time zone: UTC+3 (EAT)
- Website: www.kyankwanzi.go.ug

Kyankwanzi District is the westernmost district in the Central Region of Uganda and Buganda Kingdom, bordering Bunyoro. The district headquarters are in Butemba Town.

== Geography ==
The Kyankwanzi District borders Nakaseke District to the east across the Mayanja River, Kiboga District to the south-east, Mubende District and Kibaale District to the south-west across the Lugogo River, and Hoima and Masindi districts to the north across the River Kafu. The district headquarters in Butemba Town on the Bukwiri-Kyankwanzi Road are approximately 160 kilometres (99 mi) by road from Kampala, the nation's capital.

The district has lush green forests and prairies with only minor elevation differences as it is the plateau behind the western fork of the East African Rift running across the Hoima District. The altitude is roughly 1,000–1,200 meters above sea level.

== History ==
Kyankwanzi District was carved out of Kiboga District by an Act of Parliament in July 2010, with eight sub-counties in Kiboga North County. Prior to the creation, district services operated from the town of Kiboga, approximately 35 kilometres (22 mi) from Butemba. Further in the past, Kyankwanzi District was carved out of Kiboga District. The reasons given for forming Kyankwanzi District included the long distances that residents had to travel to access district services at Kiboga.

The district's name derives from the town of Kyankwanzi, 20 km from Kampala-Hoima Road, as the region is historically associated with the National Resistance Movement (NRM), which started the Ugandan Bush War of 1981-86 from cattle-herding Kyankwanzi under the direction of President Museveni. Up to this day, Kyankwanzi serves as the strong foothold of the NRM and hosts the National Leadership Institute that provides training to serving military troops and public servants of Uganda. Meanwhile, Butemba was chosen as the district seat for accessibility and land availability reasons.

== Administrative units ==
The district has only two counties, Butemba and Ntwetwe.

Culturally, Kyankwanzi is the northwestern frontier of the Buganda Kingdom, overseen from the Ssingo county seat of Mityana. Once belonging to Bunyoro, as Rugonjwa Sub-county, Nsambya Sub-county in the northwest was won by the Buganda Kingdom in the battles in the 1890s under Kabaka Mwanga II's rule.

== Demographics ==
In 1991, the national population census estimated the district population at 43,500. The next national census in 2002 estimated the population at 120,600. In 2012, the population was estimated at 182,900.

In 2009, Kyankwanzi Sub-county, then under the Kiboga District, was recorded as the poorest administrative area in the Central Region, with 38 percent of the population living on less than US$1.00 a day.

Kiboga and Kyankwanzi are popular destinations for rural-to-rural migration in Uganda. The government announced in the 1990s the availability of land resources to attract farmers from around the country. It is now inhabited by the Gwere, Soga, and Masaba peoples in the east, and the Kiga and Fumbira peoples from Kigezi in the southwest, as well as indigenous Baganda, Banyoro, and the cattle-keeping Ankole people/Rwandans with some Congolese refugees. Almost all residents are at least bilingual.

== Economic activities ==
Crop husbandry, livestock keeping, logging/charcoal-making are the three major economic activities in the district.

Because the Kyankwanzi District is located along the cattle corridor that crosses the country from south-west to north-east, many residents are of Banyankole/Banyarwanda origin who pasture Ankole cattle in the vast woodland. Cattle-keeping is mostly concentrated on Kapeke, Kyankwanzi, Nsambya Sub-county areas. In these areas, weekly or bi-monthly cattle markets are set up in major trading centers.

Crop husbandry is most prominent in the Nsambya Sub-country area with maize, beans, and rice produced, as well as tobacco leaves. Nsambya crop produce is marketed in the regional town of Hoima and the capital Kampala, where traders from urban areas and as far as in South Sudan and Kenya make purchases. Food crops, both for cash and subsistence purposes, include the following:

- Maize
- Common beans
- Groundnuts
- Upland rice of NERICA varieties
- Pineapples
- Tobacco
- Plantain
- Sweet Potatoes
- Cassava
- Millet
- Sorghum

Utilizing the rich soil, the Kyankwanzi area is also known as a producer of forest products, namely, timber and charcoal, both of which are tax revenue sources.

The German company Global Woods AG has obtained a 50-year tree farming license from the National Forestry Authority for an area of 12,186 hectares on Ugandan state land in the Kikonda Forest Reserve. Global Woods plans to plant monocultures mainly of pine (Pinus caribaea, Pinus oocarpa) and eucalyptus (Eucalyptus grandis) trees on 8,000 hectares for later logging and to reserve the rest "for conservation". Local farmers were driven from the land, ending the traditional practice of grazing cattle in the woods and making charcoal for cooking and the market. Global Woods sells carbon credits, which allow the purchaser to emit more greenhouse gases than the limit agreed in the Kyoto Protocol and later international climate conferences. Carbon certificates are also the subject of a speculative financial market.

Public transport to Kyankwanzi District is chiefly made up of long-distance bus services which connect Kampala with the Bunyoro capital of Hoima. Taxis, both in wagons and sedans, connect major trading centres such as Bukwiri, Ntwetwe, Kyenda, Ntunda, and Kikonda with Kiboga. Kyankwanzi is served by taxis from Bukwiri and Bukomero, beside the training participants at the National Leadership Institute who have direct shuttle services from Kampala.
