= Lake Wamala =

Lake in Uganda

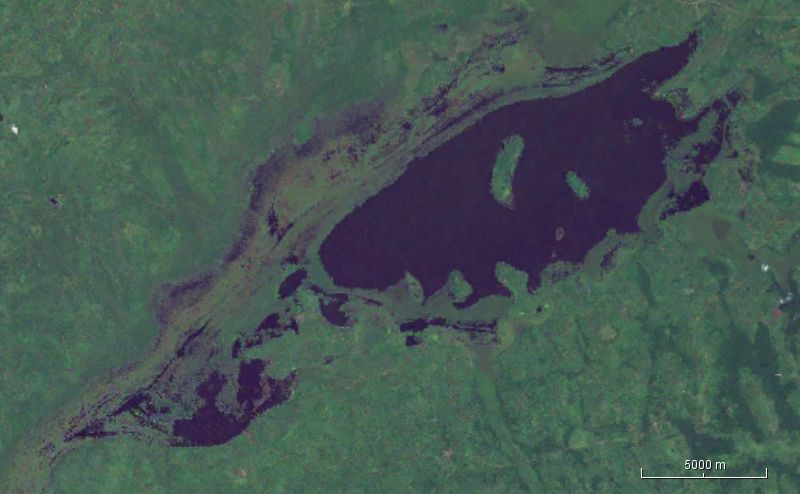

- Location within Uganda Location within Africa
- Location: Mityana District, Uganda
- Coordinates: 00°20′44″N 31°53′16″E
- Primary inflows: River Nyanzi; River Kitenga; River Kabasuma; River Mpamujugu; River Bimbye
- Primary outflows: Kibimba River
- Basin countries: Uganda
- Surface area: 250 km^{2} (97 mi^{2})
- Surface elevation: 1,290 m (4,230 ft)
- Islands: Lwanja Island; Mabo Island; Bagwe Island
- Settlements: Kalyankoko; Mityana District

Lake Wamala is a freshwater lake in Uganda. Its wetlands contain endangered species of birds and animals including the sitatunga ("enjobe" in Luganda). The lake is of traditional and cultural significance to the people of Buganda in Central Uganda.

== Location ==
The lake is shared by the districts of Kassanda, Mityana, and Gomba in the Buganda Region of Uganda. The road distance between downtown Mityana and Kalyankoko, Kimuli, Mityana District, on the eastern shores of Lake Wamala is approximately 17 kilometres (11 mi). The coordinates of Lake Wamala are 0°20'44.0"N, 31°53'16.0"E (Latitude:0.345545; Longitude:31.887778).

== Overview ==
Lake Wamala covers an area of approximately 250 square kilometres (97 mi^{2}). It is dotted by many islands, including Lwanju Island, Mabo Island, and Bagwe Island, Kiraza, Kazinga, among others. Several rivers flow into the lake, including the River Nyanzi, the River Kitenga, the River Kaabasuma, the River Mpamujugu, and the River Bbimbye. The lake is drained by the Kibimba River into the Katonga River, which in turn drains into Lake Victoria. The Kibimba River, however, is highly seasonal and for much of the time its course remains essentially dry. Lake Wamala is of significant economic and cultural interest locally and is jointly administered by the districts of Mubende, Mityana, and Mpigi, each of which share a part of the lake along common borders.

== History ==
More than 4,000 years ago Lake Wamala was part of Lake Victoria, but has since receded into its current state. One apocryphal myth supposes that Lake Wamala derives its name from a King Wamala, the last monarch of the Bachwezi dynasty and that King Wamala disappeared into the lake at a site near Lubajja fishing village called Nakyegalika and his spirit resides in the lake.

== Flora and fauna ==
The vegetation surrounding Lake Wamala is dominated by papyrus, other floaters, and water-based vegetation. There are also trees such as Raphia and other palms. A variety of animal species such as sitatunga, wild pigs, hippopotamus, bushbuck, waterbuck, vervet monkey, baboon, guinea fowl, and turaco live near the lake. Existing fish species include tilapia, catfish, and lungfish.

== Fishing patterns ==
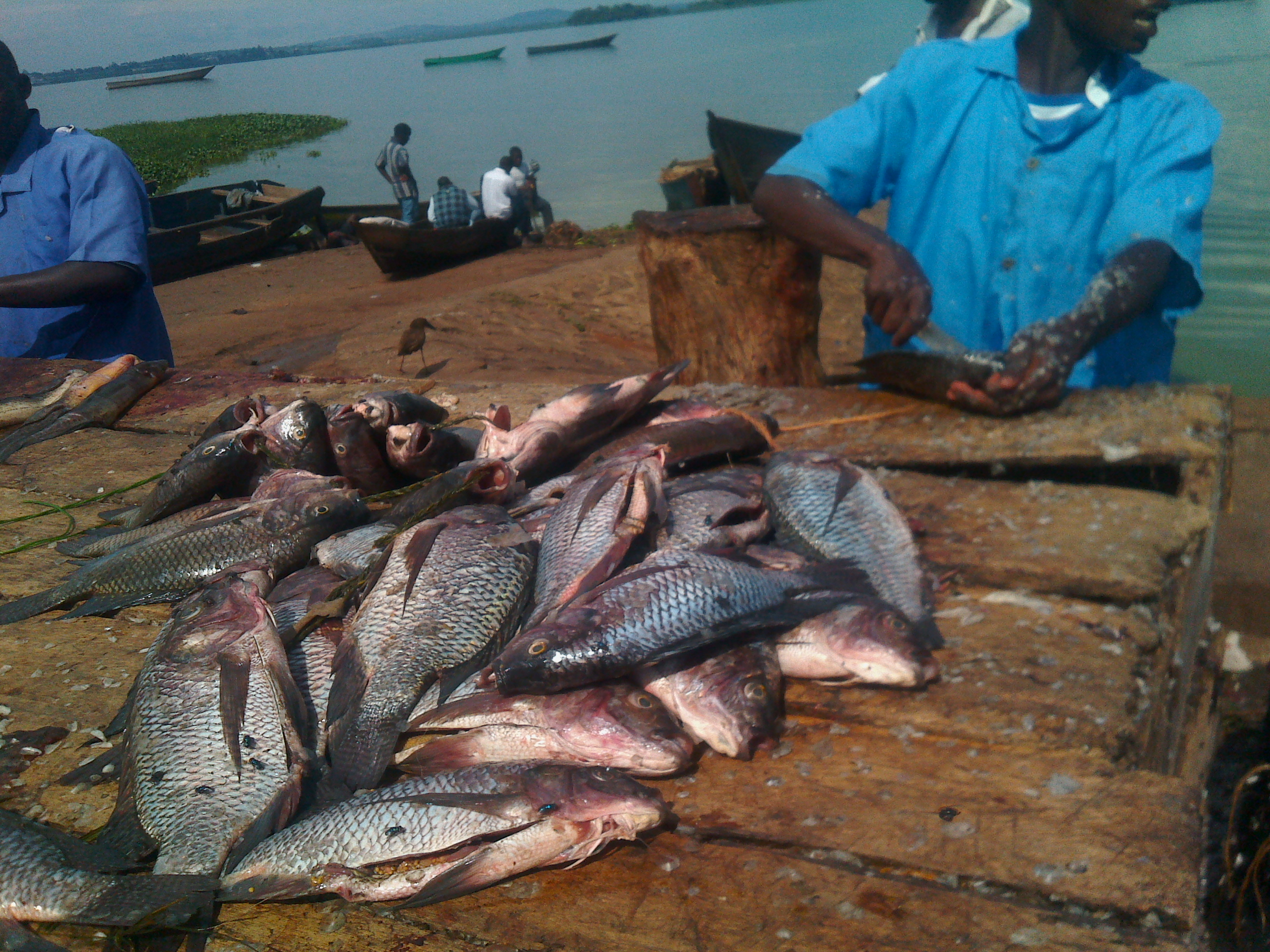
Fishing activity done on Lake Wamala.

During the 1960s and the early 1970s, Lake Wamala was an important source of both fresh and smoked fish sold locally and in the big towns in Buganda. Due to mismanagement and uncontrolled, unregulated commercial fishing on the lake, the fish were depleted in the mid-1970s. Climate change has also worsened the lake conditions, to the detriment of the local fishermen and their families. One of the cleanest lakes in Uganda and with calm waters (Researched by Ariiho Robert Kahiigi).

== See also ==
- Bunyoro-Kitara
- Kabaka of Buganda
