= Nakayima Tree =

Tree shrine and cultural heritage site in Uganda

Nakayima tree
- Embuga ya Nakayima (Luganda)
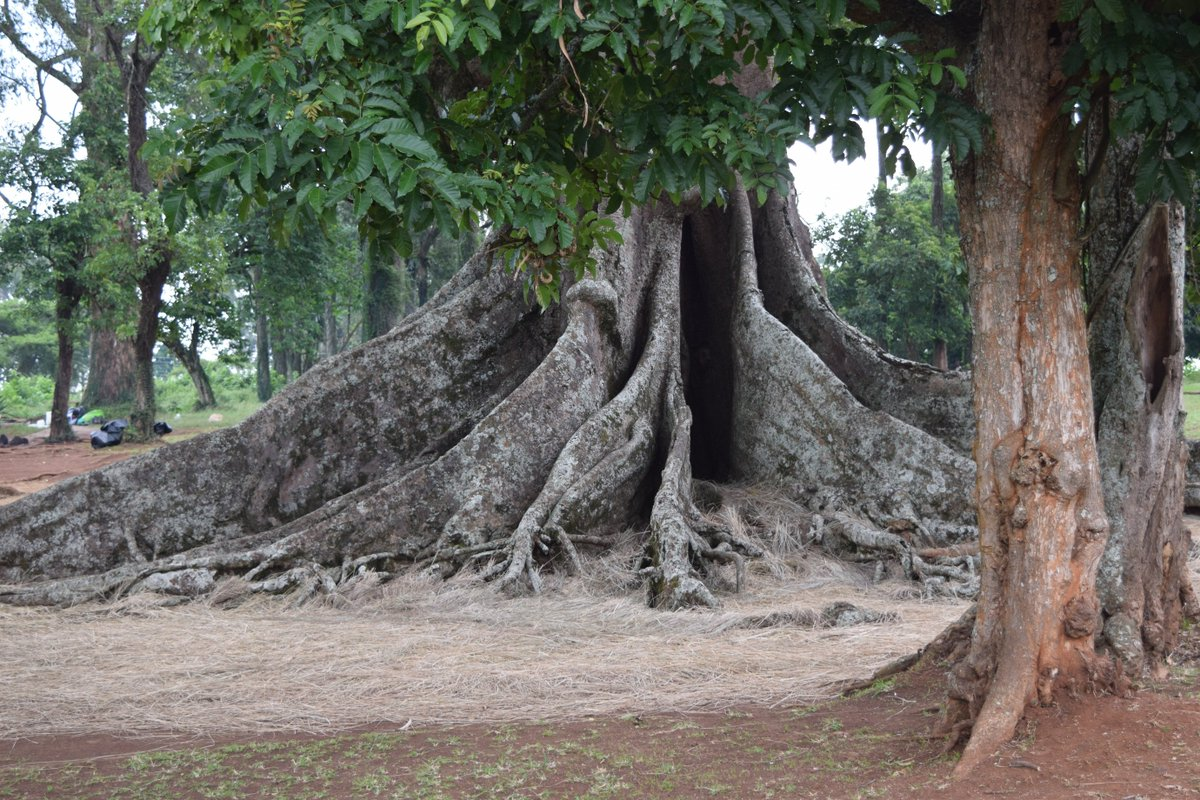
- The Nakayima tree shrine in Mubende district
- Interactive map of Nakayima tree
- 0°34′32″N 31°22′45″E
- Location: Mubende District

History
- Founded: Bachwezi

Site notes
- Elevation: 210 m
- Height: 40 m
- Area: 10 acres
- Governing body: Ministry of Culture Community Development, Uganda

Nakayima Tree, as known as Nakayima tree shrine, Nakayima witch tree, Bachwezi witch tree, Mubende's Witch Tree or Embuga ya Nakayima, is an ancient historical tree and cultural heritage site in Mubende District in Uganda. It is among the oldest trees in Uganda with its age over 350 years.

== Location ==
Nakayima tree is located found in Boma cell, Nakavima ward, West division, in Mubende municipality, Mubende district.

Nakayima tree is located 4 kilometers from Mubende town on a 700 feet tall Mubende hill also called Boma hill on the Kampala to Fort Portal highway that is 1480 metres above sea level and 172 kilometers West of Kampala. To reach Nakayima tree one takes 3 hours and 15 minutes drive from Kampala to Mubende hill. The Nakayima tree shrine sits on 10 acres of land. Mubende hill was the residential home for Nyakahuma (the oldest wife of Ndahura).

== History ==
Nakayima tree was named after Nakayima who was the priestess of Ndahura (the first Bachwezi king). Nakayima was believed to be a go between Ndahura and the community. Nakayima was believed to have vanished into the tree thus the name Nakayima tree. Nakayima is a known as god of wealth and power.

The locals believe that the Nakayima tree gives power, fertility, heals diseases, good omen among other things when they consult it.

It is believed that the Nakayima tree served as a fence for King Ndahura's palace.

== Structure and formation ==
Nakayima tree species name is known as Mukoko (in Runyoro - Rutoro language) and its botanical name is sterculiaceae.

Nakayima tree has a height of 40 meters, it occupies a surface area of 20 feet on land, it has buttress roots extending 50 metres away from the main tree, and it has encloses 9 rooms that are believed to have powers to heal, give happiness and life.

Nearby to the tree buttress are often scared fire-places which are always burning; namely Ddungu, Bamweyena, Kiwanuka and Kalisa. Ddungu is regarded as the god of hunting, Bamweyena is the god of prosperity, Kiwanuka is the god of war and millitary commanders, while Kalisa is the god of cattle keepers.

Nakayima tree is divided into nine rooms found in the buttress roots which include the four rooms for King Ndahura, two for Jajja Musoke, two for Kilunda, one for Mukasa and one for Nakayima. Ndahura is referred to as The healer of smallpox, it is where people who want to heal from small pox go to pray. The rooms have figurines of the gods they were named after.

== Taboos ==
Women must dress in long garments which are not trousers and also when they are not allowed to visit the tree when they are in their menstruation period.

The tree branches are not supposed to be cut, and those that fall are not supposed to be used for any purpose such as cooking but they are left to rot on their own.

Only food that has been instructed to be brought by the gods is supposed to be brought by the pilgrim to the shrine and be prepared only in Nabuzana's kitchen and shared with other pilgrims.

Pilgrims are only supposed to turn their backs to the Nakayima tree when they are leaving the place. And can not leave until they have reached the main entrance.

Pilgrims are not supposed to wave goodbye to their gods after prayers but they have to just have to walk away slowly.

== Tourism and traditional beliefs ==
Nakayima tree attracts tourists and pilgrims from with in Uganda and also globally who are allowed to enter the site at any time they want with no restriction of the time they spend inside the shrine. The visitors/tourists pay 5,000 UGX (in 2023) or more which is used for managing and maintenance the site around the Nakayima tree.

People visit the tree to pray, sing and also give and burn their offerings/sacrifices to their gods who can manifest in any form which includes a dog or cat. The offerings can be in form of money, animals, cereals, grains, coffee beans, animal products such as milk, ghee among other items and they are placed under the tree or some offering such as millet, sim sim and sorghum are scattered around the Nakayima tree. The offerings such as money are put in baskets called Ebigali. Nakayima tree does not grant prayers for those who want to befall their enemies or do evil acts.

Some believers claim that Nakayima appears to them with instructions in their dreams on what to do in order for their prayer requests to be answered with in a period of three days to a month.

And when one's prayer request is answered by the gods he or she prayed through, they are expected to return with a sacrifice/offering to thank the god he or prayed through and also share some of the sacrifice with the other people on the Nakayima site.

Only food that has been instructed to be brought by the gods is supposed to be brought by the pilgrim and be prepared only in Nabuzana's kitchen and shared with other pilgrims.

The nine rooms at the Nakayima tree;

- First room serves as the reception, restaurant and lodge.
- Second room is for King Ndahura.
- Third room is for Nabuzana (the goddess of marriage and fertility).
- Fourth room is meant for prayers for the pilgrims seeking to give birth to twins.
- Fifth room is for Musoke (the god of rain).
- Sixth room is for Kiwanuka (the god of war and the army commander).
- Seventh room is for Kalisa (The god of cattle keeping). Kalisa treated Nakayima's cattle.
- Eighth room is for Ddungu (the god of hunting).
- Ninth room is for Mukasa (the god of water and fishing).

== Annual ritual event ==
On 4 December 2024, over 500 people attended the annual ritual event/festival at the Nakayima tree. At 5:00am EAT a dry branch from the Nakayima tree broke and fell and it on, killed two people on the spot, hurt eight people who were rushed to Mubende Regional Referral Hospital where two out of the eight people passed on as the Uganda Police Confirmed. The accident was related to the violation of the cultural norms attached to the Nakayima tree that include engaging in sexual activity which is a taboo.

== See also ==
- Bigo Bya mugenyi
- Mubende district
- Tanda pits
