= Mityana Hospital =

- Uganda Ministry of Health
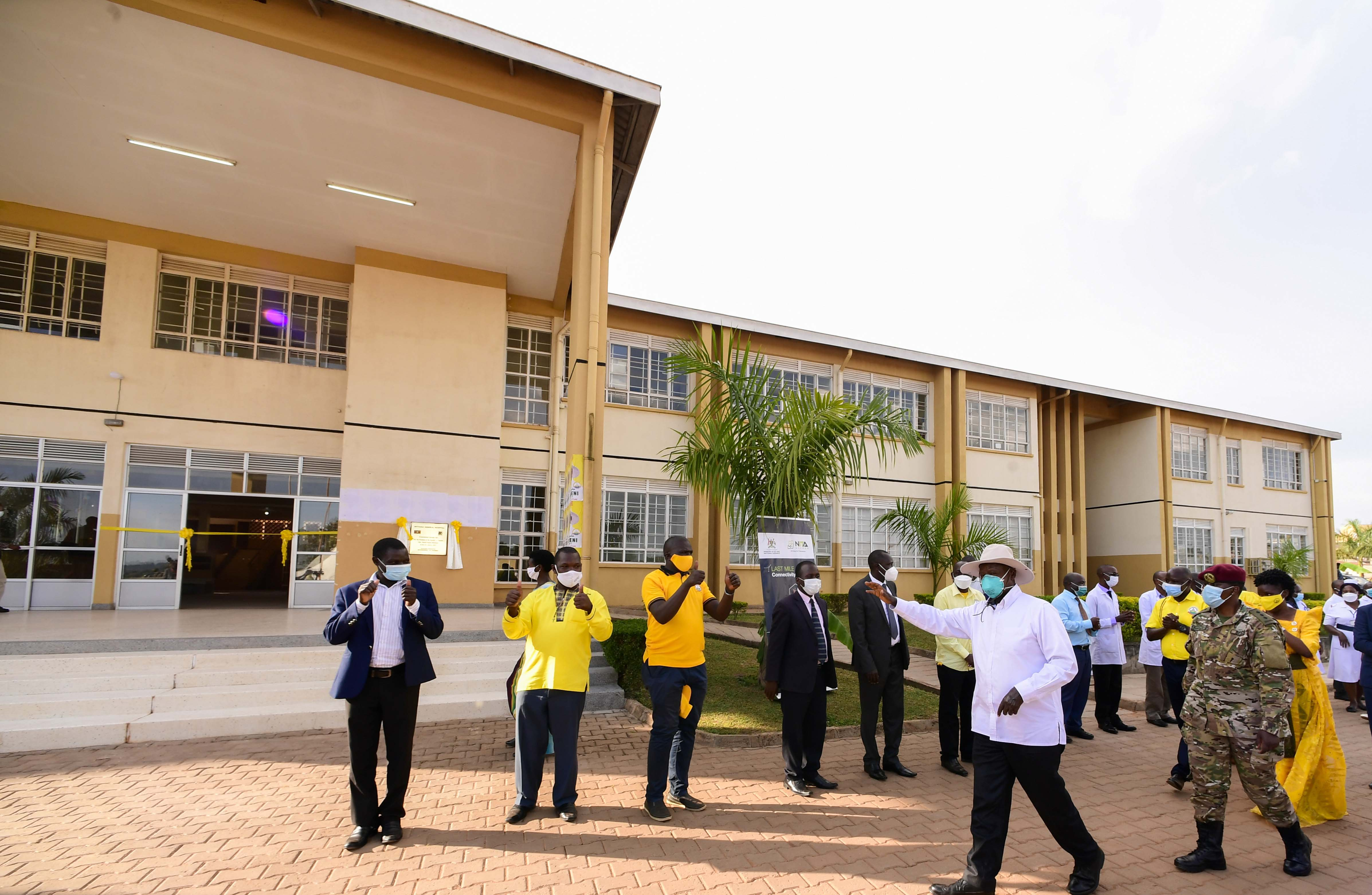
- Mityana Hospital

Geography
- Location: Mityana, Mityana District, Buganda Region, Uganda
- Coordinates: 00°23′48″N 32°03′34″E

Organisation
- Care system: Public
- Type: General

Services
- Emergency department: II
- Beds: 100

History
- Founded: 1940

Links
- Other links: Hospitals in Uganda; Medical education in Uganda

Mityana Hospital, also Mityana General Hospital or Mityana District Hospital is a hospital in the town of Mityana, Mityana District in the Central Region of Uganda.

== Location ==
Mityana Hospital is located in the central business district of the town of Mityana, about 85 kilometres (53 mi) east of Mubende Regional Referral Hospital, the regional referral hospital.

This is approximately 69 kilometres (43 mi) west of Mulago National Referral Hospital, the largest hospital in the country. The coordinates of Mityana Hospital are: 0°23'48.0"N, 32°02'34.0"E Latitude:0.396667; Longitude:32.042778).

== Overview ==
Mityana Hospital is a public hospital, funded by the Uganda Ministry of Health and general care in the hospital is free. The hospital opened in 1940 and has, until 2013 been in a dilapidated state, with crumbling buildings and antiquated or non-existent equipment. In December 2013, the Government of Uganda, using funds borrowed from the World Bank, began an update and renovation of the institution. Those renovations concluded in 2015.

== See also ==
- Mityana
- List of hospitals in Uganda
