= Mayanja River =

Mayanja
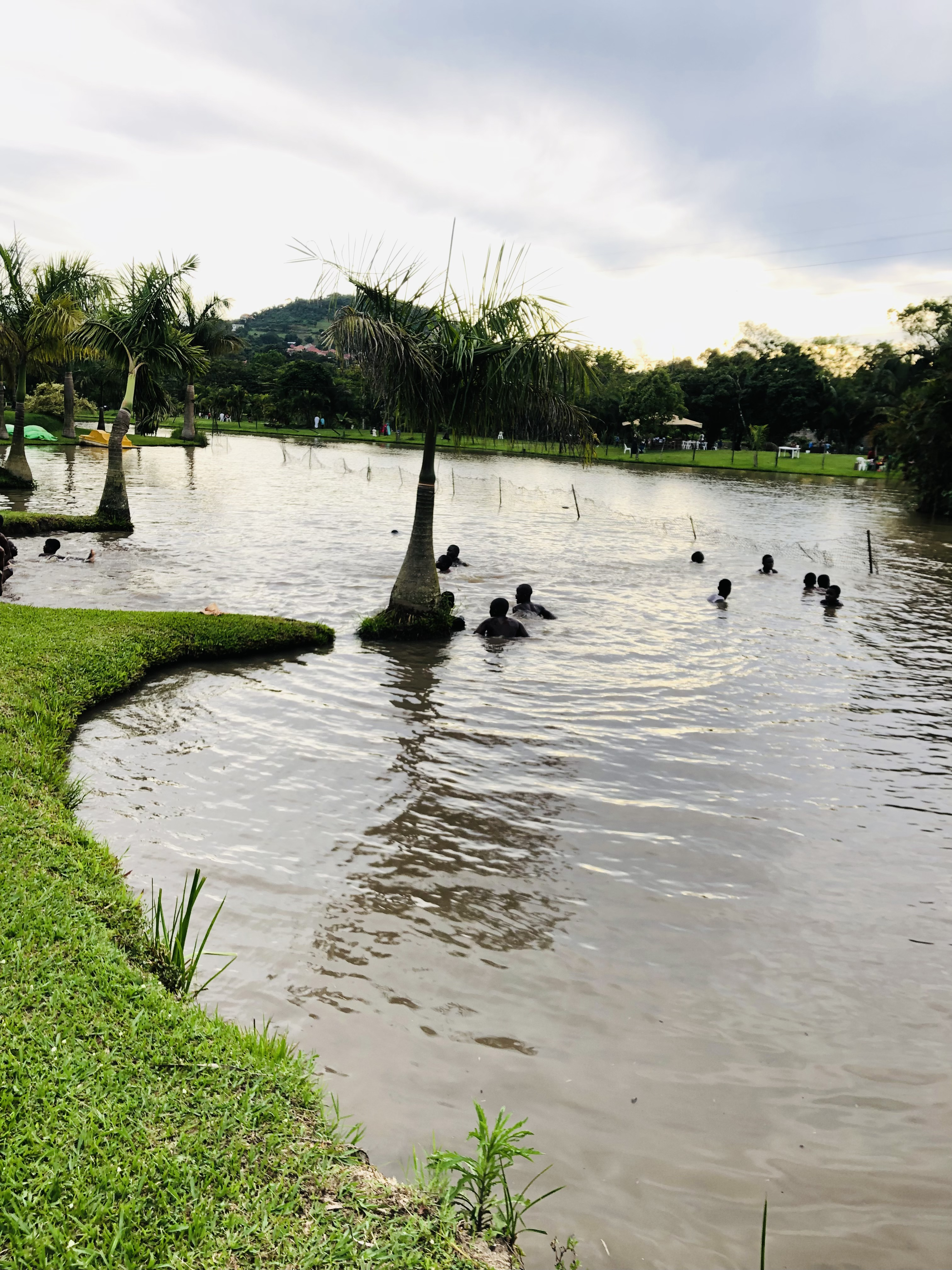

Location
- Country: Uganda

Physical characteristics
- Source: Wakiso Hills, Wakiso District
  - location: Wakiso, Central Region, Uganda
  - coordinates: 00°24′36″N 32°31′12″E
  - elevation: 1,140 m (3,740 ft)
- Mouth: River Kafu, Nakaseke District
  - location: Ndede, Central Region, Uganda
  - coordinates: 01°21′27″N 31°49′12″E
  - elevation: 1,000 m (3,300 ft)
- Length: 150 km (93 mi)

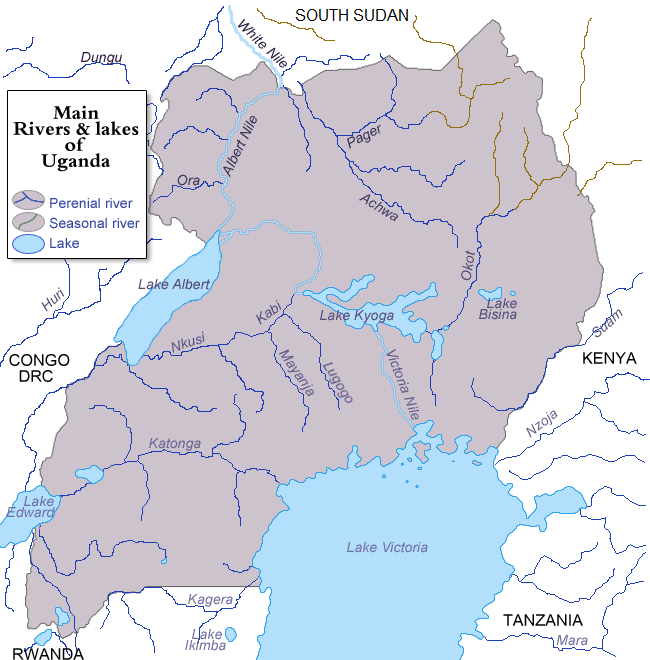
Rivers and lakes of Uganda

River Mayanja is a river in Uganda, East Africa.

== Location ==
The Mayanja River is located in Central Uganda. It starts from the hills, northeast of the town of Wakiso, in Wakiso District, Central Uganda and flows in a northwestern direction to empty into River Kafu, Nakaseke District at its border with Masindi District and Kyankwanzi District.

The source of River Mayanja is located in Wakiso, with coordinates: Latitude:0.41000, 32.52000. River Mayanja enters River Kafu near the village of Ndede, in Nakaseke District, with coordinates: Latitude:1.3575; Longitude:31.8200.

== Course ==
On its course northwestwards, the river traverses or forms the borders of the following districts : Wakiso District, Mpigi District, Kiboga District, Kyankwanzi District and Nakaseke District. At its source, the altitude is approximately 1,140 metres (3,740 ft). At its point of entry into River Kafu, the altitude is approximately 1,000 metres (3,300 ft). The length of River Mayanja, is approximately 150 kilometres (93 mi) from source to end.

== See also ==
- River Kafu
- Wakiso
- Wakiso District
- Mpigi District
- Kiboga District
- Kyankwanzi District
- Nakaseke District
