= Kassanda =

Town in Uganda

- Map of Uganda showing location of Kassanda
- Coordinates: 00°32′48″N 31°49′11″E
- Country: Uganda
- Region: Central Region
- Sub-region: Buganda
- Districts: Kassanda District
- Elevation: 1,195 m (3,921 ft)
- Time zone: UTC+3 (EAT)

Kassanda is a town in Kassanda District, in the Buganda area of Uganda.

== Location ==
Kassanda in located in Mubende District, approximately 58 kilometres (36 mi) east of Mubende, the location of the district headquarters. This is about 110 kilometres (68 mi) west of Kampala, the capital and largest city in Uganda. The coordinates of the Kassanda are 0°32'48.0"N, 31°49'11.0"E (Latitude:0.546670; Longitude:31.819719).

== History ==
Prior to 2013, the town was a rural settlement. Then someone discovered a gold nugget on one of the hills in town. While gold has been known to exist in the area, this new find led to an influx of "prospectors" from outside the area. They came from as far away as Rwanda and Democratic Republic of the Congo. Many were previously unemployed or underemployed youth from the streets of Kampala. This has led to an impromptu "gold rush", with miners, washers, refiners, middlemen, buyers and exporters. In 2014, it was reported that five out of fifty mines (10 percent) were producing gold.

== Points of interest ==
The Myanzi–Kassanda–Bukuya–Kiboga Road passes through the middle of town.
