= River Bujuku =

River in Uganda

Coordinates: 0°21′30″N 29°58′18″E

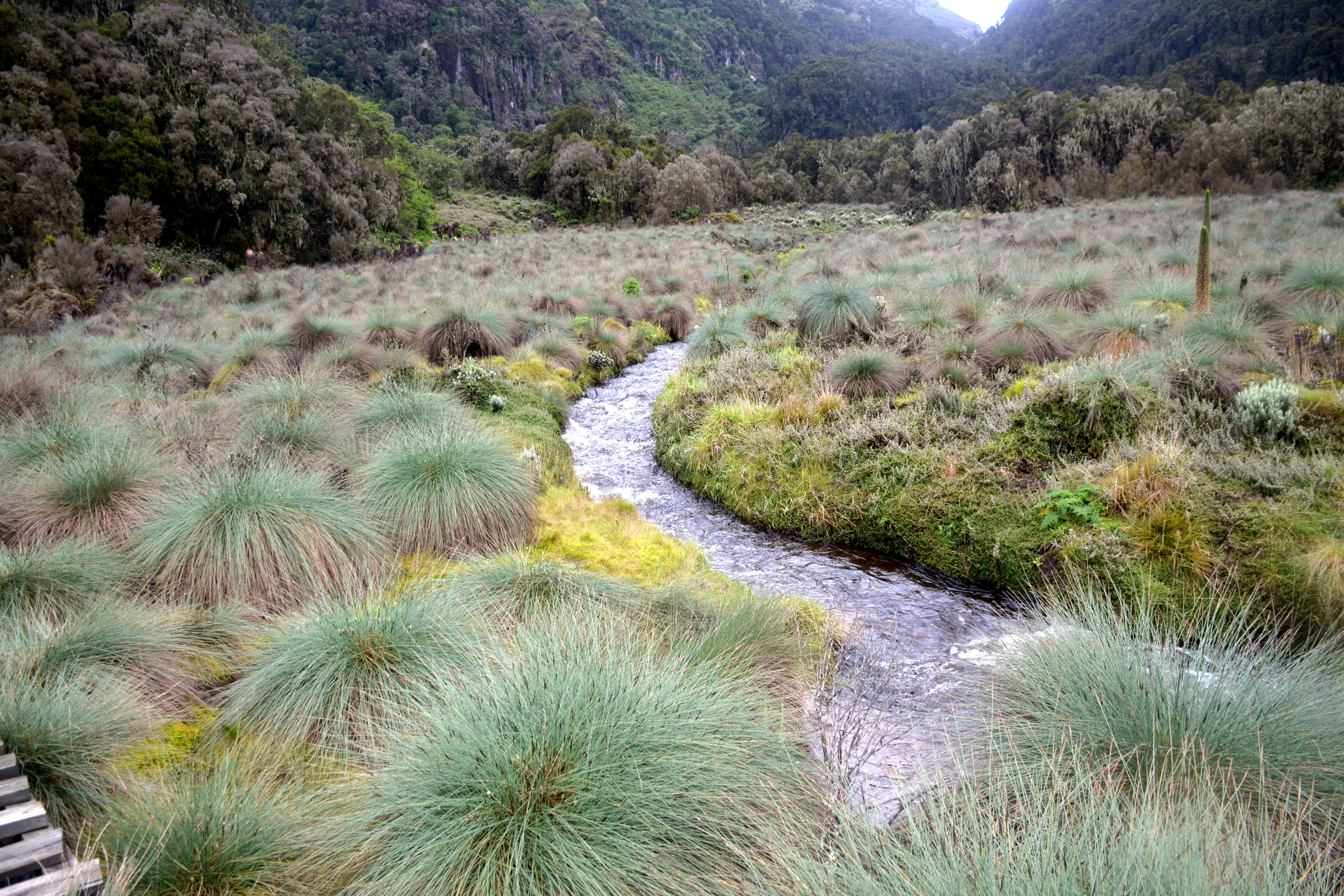
River Bujuku in the Lower Bigo Bog

River Bujuku is a Ugandan river originating from Lake Bujuku, a crater lake in the Rwenzori Mountains. The river begins at a height of 3,962 metres (12,999 ft) above sea level and flows down the mountain slopes to join the Mubuku River.
