= River Kafu =

Kafu Kabi
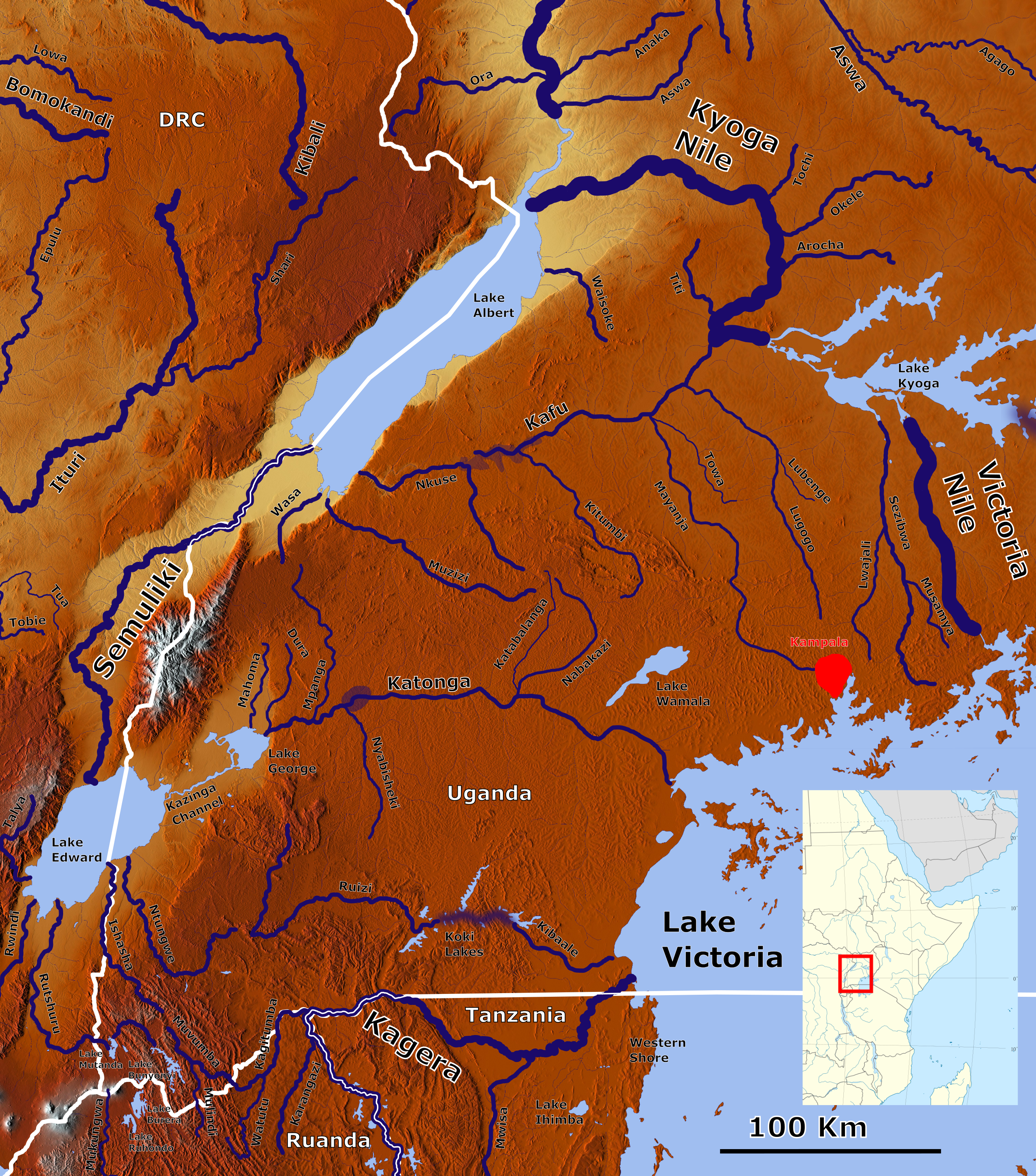

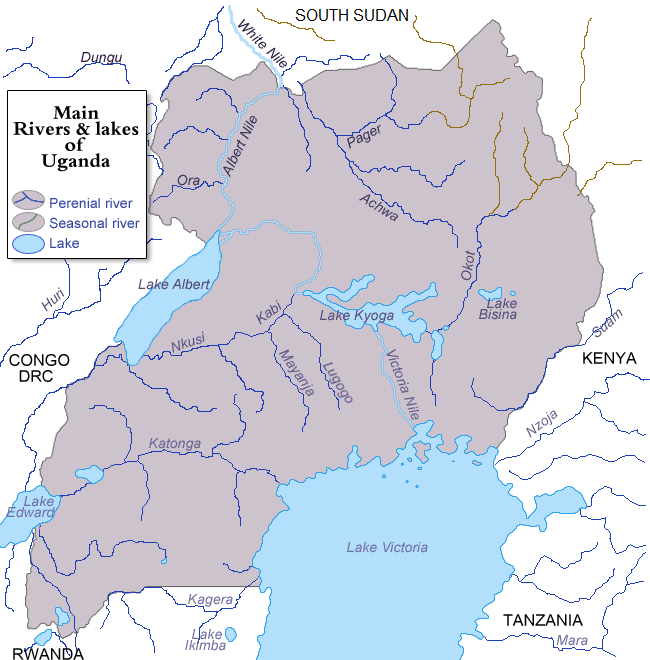
- Rivers and lakes of Uganda, with River Kafu shown as Kabi

Location
- Country: Uganda

Physical characteristics
- Source: Kitoma Swamp, Kibaale District
  - location: Kitoma, Western Region, Uganda
  - coordinates: 01°09′00″N 31°04′55″E
  - elevation: 1,100 m (3,600 ft)
- Mouth: Victoria Nile, Masindi District
  - location: Masindi Port, Western Region, Uganda
  - coordinates: 01°38′51″N 32°05′40″E
  - elevation: 1,040 m (3,410 ft)
- Length: 180 km (110 mi)

River Kafu is a river in Uganda, in East Africa. On some older maps, the river is labelled as River Kabi.

== Location ==
The Kafu River is located in the western part of Uganda. It starts from a swamp approximately 12 kilometres (7.5 mi), northeast of the village of Kitoma, in Kibaale District, Western Uganda. It flows eastwards at first, then it turns north, to empty into the Victoria Nile, approximately 8 kilometres (5.0 mi), upstream of the town of Masindi Port, in Masindi District, also in Western Uganda.

The source of River Kafu is located near Kitoma, with coordinates: Latitude:1.1500; Longitude:31.0820. River Kafu enters the Victoria Nile near Masindi Port, with coordinates: Latitude:1.6475; Longitude:32.0945. On its course eastwards, northeastwards and northwards, the river traverses or forms the borders of the following districts : Kibaale District, Hoima District, Kyankwanzi District, Nakaseke District, Nakasongola District and Masindi District.

== Overview ==
The swamp, out of which River Kafu arises, is also transversed by another river system called River Nkusi. River Nkusi however, arises elsewhere and passes through the said swamp and flows westwards to empty into Lake Albert, along the International border between Uganda and the Democratic Republic of the Congo. At its source, River Kafu is an altitude of approximately 1,100 metres (3,600 ft). At its point of entry into River Nile, the altitude is approximately 1,040 metres (3,410 ft).

The length of River Kafu is approximately 180 kilometres (110 mi), from source to end.

== See also ==
- Lake Albert
- Victoria Nile
- Masindi Port
- River Ayago
