= River Ayago =

River in Northern Uganda

Coordinates: 2°22′06″N 31°54′59″E

The River Ayago is a tributary of the Victoria Nile. It is located in the Acholi sub-region, Nwoya District in Northern Uganda. The river has a power dam that generates electricity. The river provides fishing activities for the nearby communities.
