= Katonga River =

River in Uganda

Coordinates: 00°12′N 30°50′E

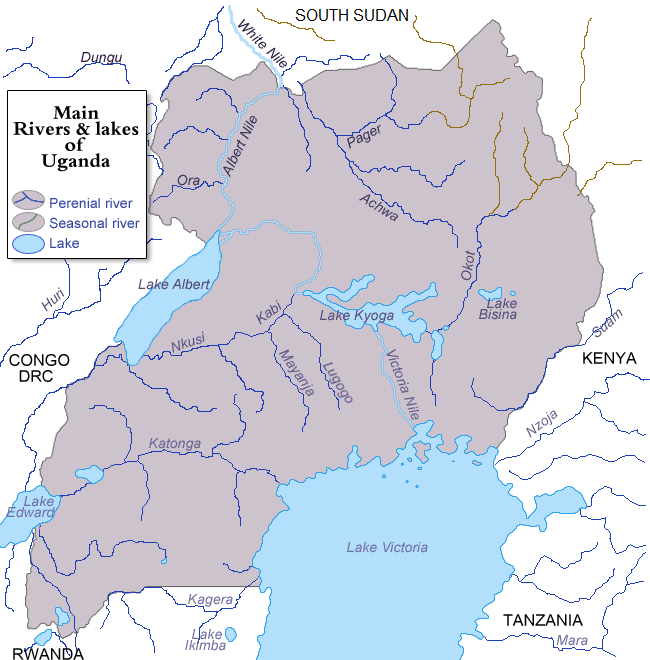
Rivers and lakes of Uganda

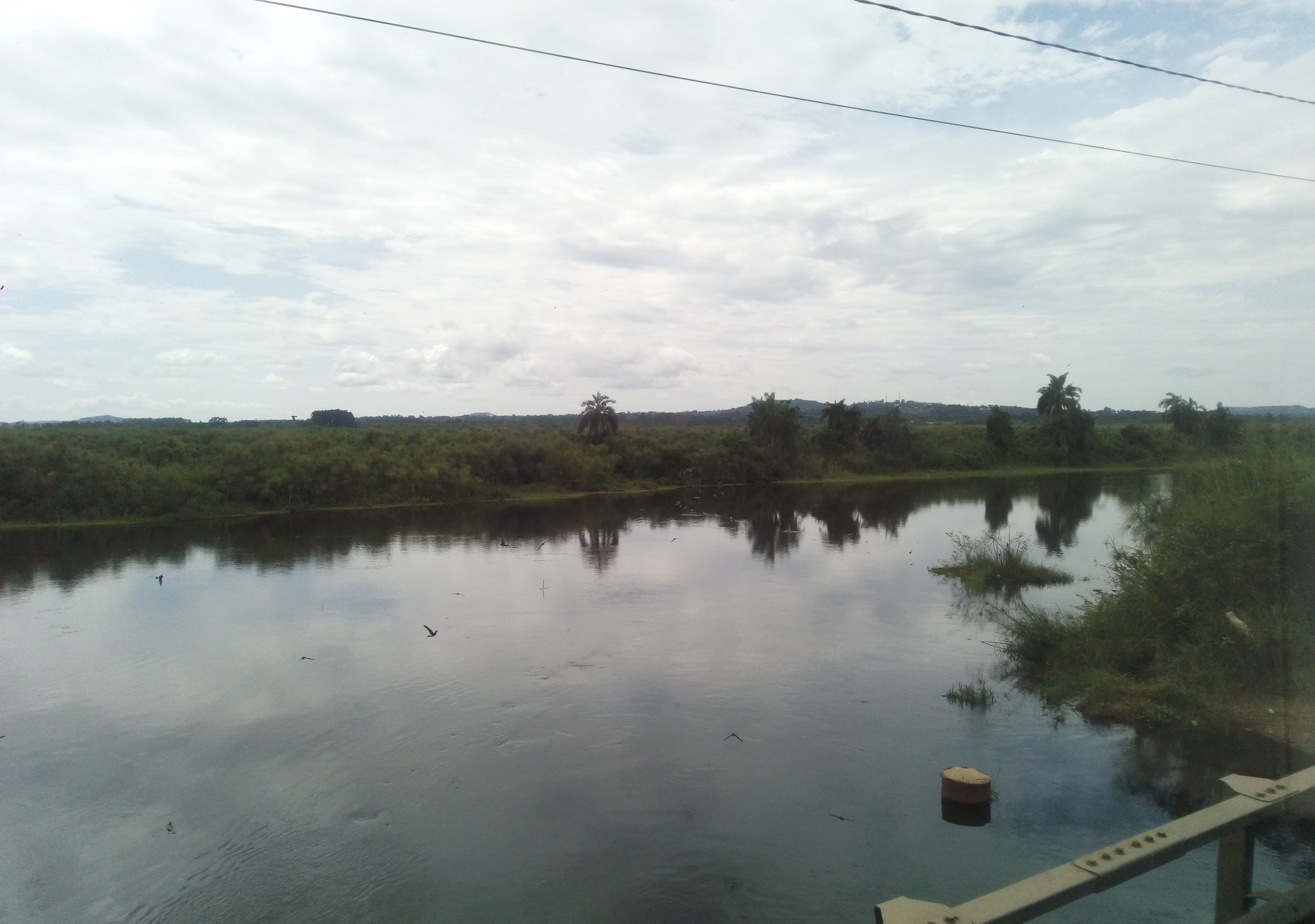
Katonga River Bridge

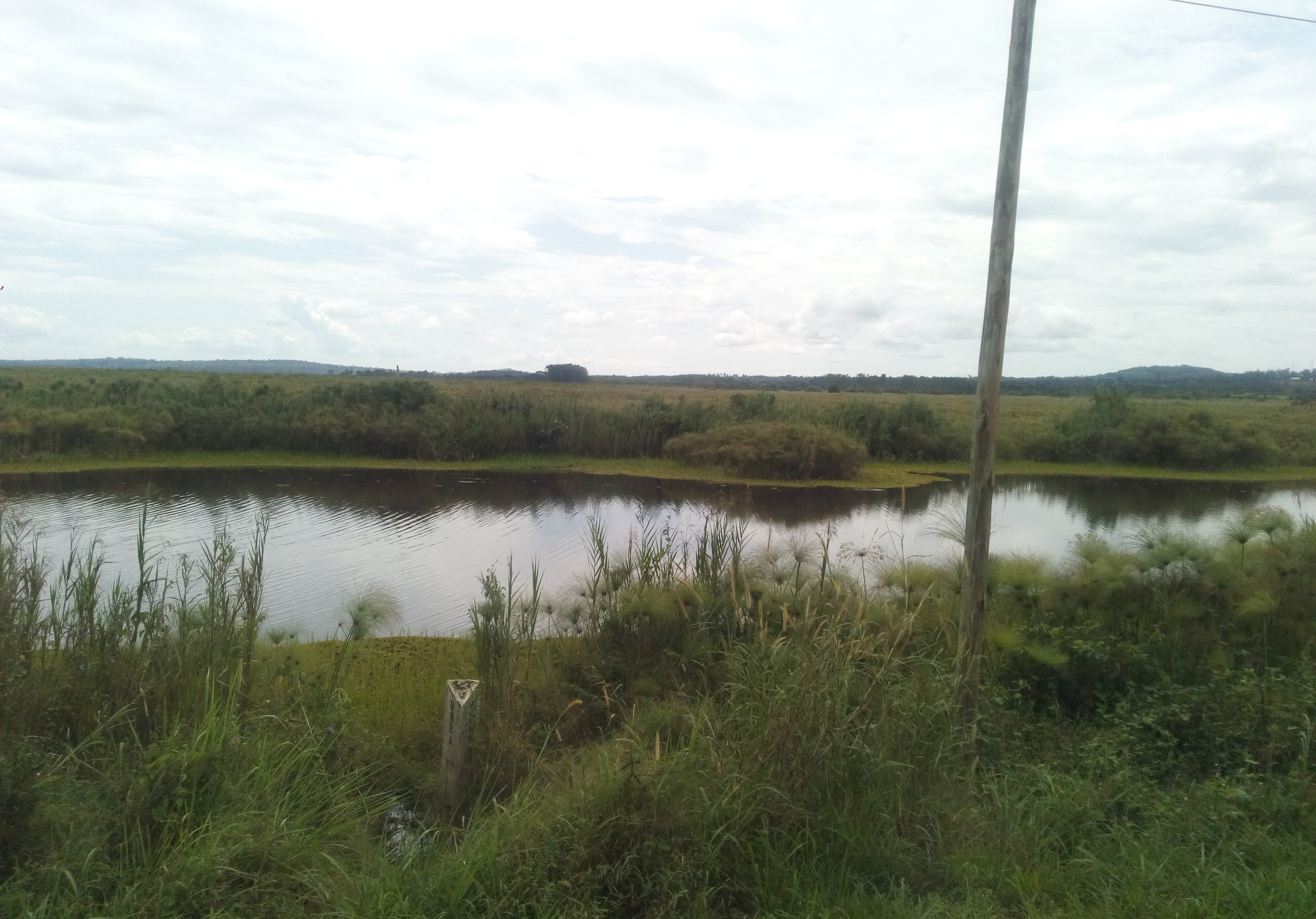
Katonga River View

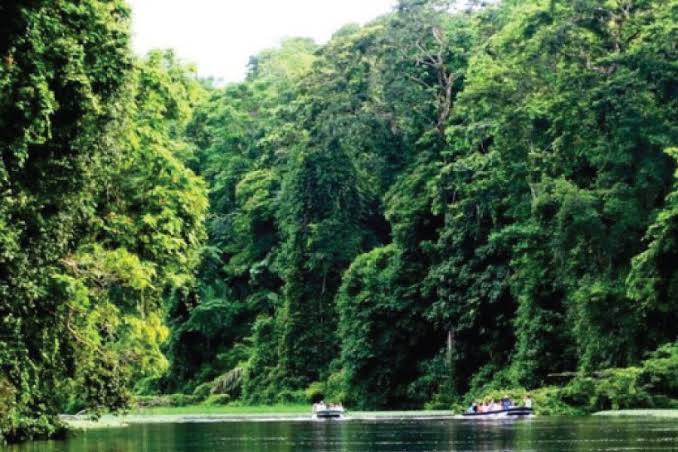
River Katonga through Katonga forest

The Katonga River is a river in Uganda, in East Africa.

== Location and description ==
The Katonga River is located in the southwestern part of Uganda. Its channel is continuous between Lake Victoria and Lake George, reflecting that it once drained away from Lake Victoria into Lake George along its entire length. Regional uplifting events between the two lakes associated with the western limb (Albertine Rift) of the geologically active East African Rift system, has caused the swampy region to the southwest of Lake Wamala to become the new watershed for the Katonga River, which now principally flows east into Lake Victoria, augmented by several tributaries along its course. This watershed is located approximately 0°13'N 30°39'E near the Katonga Wildlife Reserve, and at a distance of more than 120 km from Lake Victoria. During wet seasons, raised water levels in the vicinity of its swampy watershed will occasionally force some water to flow west from this point into the western section of the Katonga River which feeds Lake George, but the bulk of the flow still continues eastwards into Lake Victoria. West of its watershed, the Katonga River is also fed by several tributaries along its course to Lake George.

== See also ==
- Lake Edward
