= Kassanda District =

- District
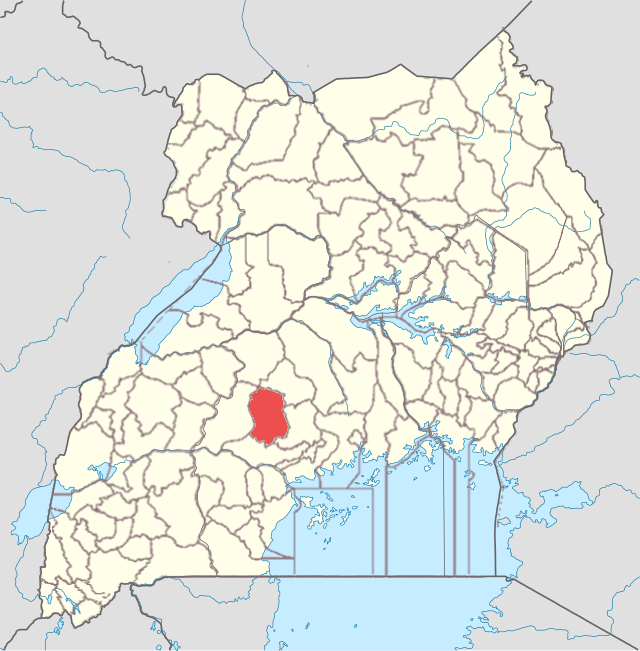
- Interactive map of Kassanda District
- Coordinates: 0°32′N 31°45′E
- Country: Uganda
- Region: Central Uganda
- Established: 1 July 2018

Area
  - Total: 1,819 km^{2} (702 sq mi)

Population (2024)
  - Total: = 313,310
  - Density: 172/km^{2} (450/sq mi)
- Time zone: UTC+3 (EAT)
- Website: kassanda.go.ug

Kassanda District is an administrative district in Central Region, Uganda. It was on July 1, 2018, after splitting from Mubende District.

== Location ==
Kassanda District is bordered by Mubende District to the west, Kyankwanzi District to the north, Kiboga District to the northeast, Mityana District to the east and southeast, and Gomba District to the south. The main town Kassanda is located 110 kilometers west of Uganda's capital city Kampala.

The population of Kassanda was estimated at 352,676 by 2020. The district has seen efforts to improve water access and has received support from organizations during public health issues like the Ebola outbreak.

== Geography ==
Kassanda District borders Mubende District, Mityana District, Kiboga District, and Gomba District. The district is about 120 km from Kampala by road.

== Administration and political structure ==
Kassanda District comprises three town councils (Kassanda Town Council, Bukuya Town Council, and Kiganda Town Council), two counties (Kassanda County and Bukuya County), and three constituencies (Kassanda South, Kassanda North, and Bukuya).

The district lists 12 sub-counties and 3 town councils, including Makokoto, Bukuuya, Kalwana, Kitumbi, Manyogaseka, Kiganda, Naluttutu, Myanzi, Kassanda, Kamuli, Kijuna, and Mbiriizi, plus Kassanda, Kiganda, and Bukuya town councils.

== Demographics ==
According to the National Population and Housing Census 2024 (preliminary results), Kassanda District had a population of 313,310. UBOS reports 271,544 in 2014 and an average annual population growth rate of 1.5% for 2014 to 2024.

Population (selected census years)
Census year	Population	Source
2014	271,544	UBOS (NPHS 2024 Preliminary Report, trends table)
2024	313,310	UBOS (NPHS 2024 Preliminary Report, preliminary totals table)

== Economy ==
The district lists gold mining as a major economic activity, especially in Kitumbi, Bukuuya, and Makokoto sub-counties, alongside agriculture such as coffee farming and maize farming, plus cattle rearing.

A national monitoring report from the Government of Uganda records biometric registration of artisanal and small-scale miners at gold mining sites in Busia and Kassanda, and reports mapping and gazetting of suitable artisanal and small-scale mining sites in Kassanda.

== Infrastructure and public services ==
The district budget framework paper cites road network constraints and notes road maintenance funding through the Uganda Road Fund at district level and Community Access Roads at sub-county level.

== Politics ==
In the 2021 local government elections, Fred Zimula Kasirye was declared elected as Kassanda District LC V Chairperson.

== See also ==
- Mubende District
- Buganda
