= Kiboga =

Town in Uganda

Kiboga Kiboga Municipality
- Location in Uganda
- Coordinates: 00°55′12″N 31°45′36″E
- Country: Uganda
- Region: Central Region
- District: Kiboga District
- Elevation: 3,870 ft (1,180 m)

Population (2020 Estimate)
  - Total: 22,400

Kiboga is a town in the Central Region of Uganda. It is the main municipal, administrative, and commercial center of Kiboga District, and the district headquarters are located there.

== Location ==
Kiboga is located approximately 123 kilometres (76 mi) northwest of Kampala, Uganda's largest city, on the all-weather tarmac Kampala–Hoima Road. This is about 79 kilometres (49 mi), by road, southeast of Hoima, the center of Uganda's petrochemical industry. The geographical coordinates of Kiboga Town Council are 0°55'03.0"N, 31°45'36.0"E (Latitude:0.9175; Longitude:31.7600).

== Population ==
The population of Kiboga was estimated at 12,000 during the 2002 national population census. In 2010, the Uganda Bureau of Statistics (UBOS) estimated the population at 16,600. In 2011, UBOS estimated the mid-year population at 17,400. During the 2014 national population census, the population was enumerated at 19,591.

In 2015, UBOS estimated the population of Kiboga Town Council at 19,700. In 2020, the statistics agency estimated the mid-year population of the town at 22,400 inhabitants. Of these, 11,500 (51.3 percent) were females and 10,900 (48.7 percent) were males. UBOS calculated that the population of Kiboga Town expanded at an average rate of 2.6 percent annually, between 2015 and 2020.

Historical population
| Year | Pop. | ±% |
|---|---|---|
| 2002 | 12,000 | — |
| 2010 | 16,600 | +38.3% |
| 2011 | 17,400 | +4.8% |
| 2014 | 19,591 | +12.6% |
| 2015 | 19,700 | +0.6% |
| 2020 | 22,400 | +13.7% |

== Points of interest ==
The points of interest in or near the town of Kiboga include the headquarters of Kiboga District Administration, the offices of Kiboga Town Council, and Kiboga Central Market.

Kiboga General Hospital, a 100-bed public hospital, administered by the Uganda Ministry of Health, is located in the middle of town. The Kampala-Hoima Road passes through the middle of the town in a northwest–southeast direction.
