= Mubende =

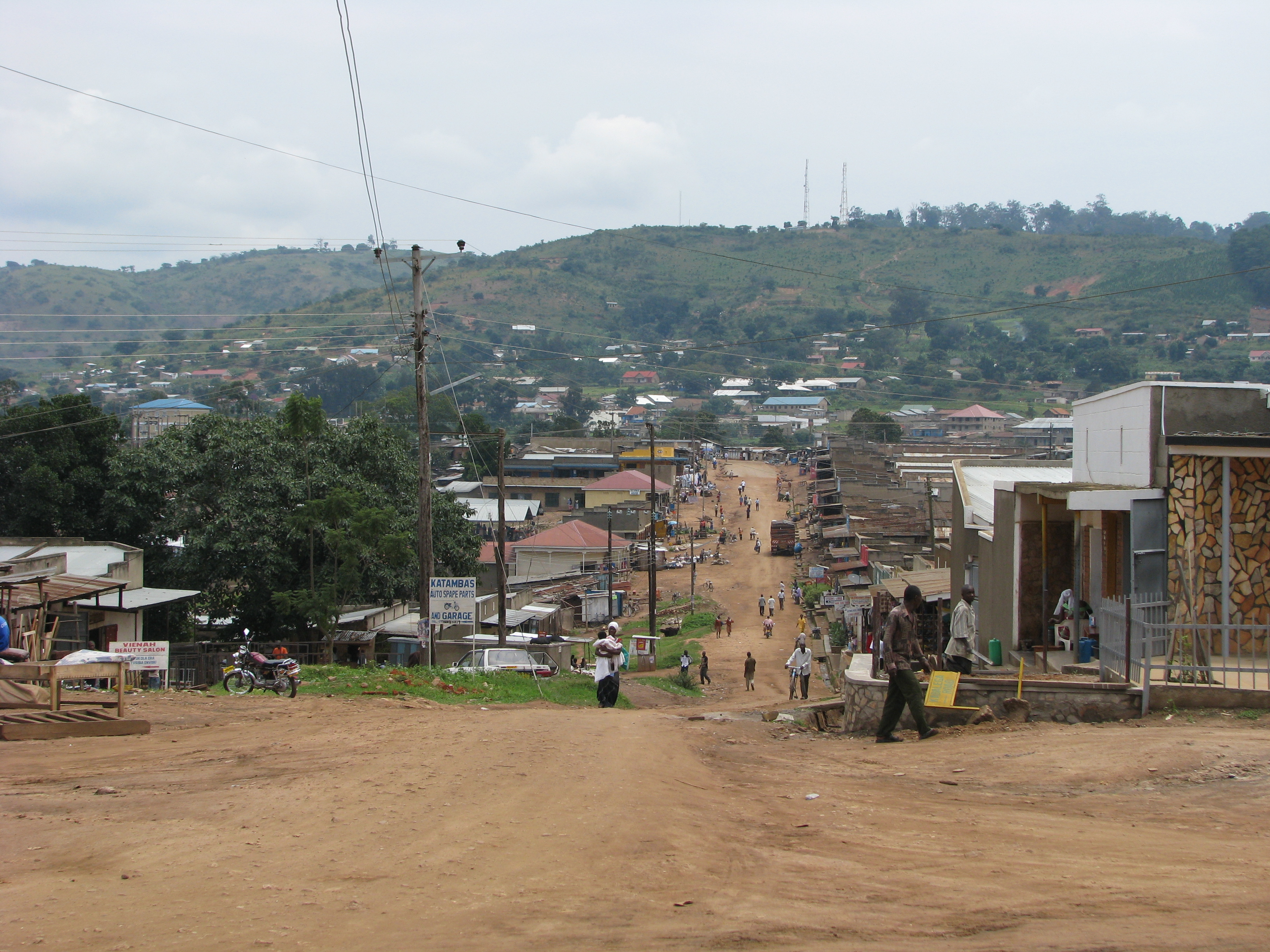
- Mubende in August 2007

- Location in Uganda
- Coordinates: 00°33′27″N 31°23′42″E
- Country: Uganda
- Region: Central Region of Uganda
- District: Mubende District
- Elevation: 4,619 ft (1,408 m)

Population (2014 Census)
  - Total: 103,473

Mubende is a town in the Central Region of Uganda. It is the main municipal, administrative, and commercial center of Mubende District and is the location of the district headquarters.

== Location ==
Mubende is approximately 150 kilometres (93 mi), by road, west of Kampala, the capital of Uganda and its largest city. The town is located about 145 kilometres (90 mi) east of the city of Fort Portal along the Mubende–Kyegegwa–Kyenjojo–Fort Portal Road. The geographical coordinates of the town are 0°33'27.0"N, 31°23'42.0"E (Latitude:0.5575; Longitude:31.3950). Mubende Town sits at an average elevation of 1,408 metres (4,619 ft) above mean sea level.

== Overview ==
Mubende is home to the Nakayima Shrine, said to hold the spirit of Nakayima, the wife of Ndahura, a former Bacwezi king. The site, located about 4 kilometres (2.5 mi) outside of the town's central business district, is marked by the Nakayima Tree. Large root buttresses, which form nooks and fissures, lie at the base of the tree.

The shrine is located on top of Mubende Hill, rising 213 metres (699 ft) above the surrounding terrain to a peak of 1,533 metres (5,030 ft) above sea level. The hill has a flat top where an ancient palace once stood. The shrine is visited by people paying homage to the matriarch Nakayima of the Bachwezi, believed to be semi-gods, whose dynasty ruled this region in the period prior to 1,300 AD.

== Population ==
The 2002 national census estimated the population of Mubende to be 16,000. In 2010, the Uganda Bureau of Statistics (UBOS) estimated the population at 21,400. In 2011, UBOS estimated the mid-year population at 22,200. In 2014, the national population census put the population of the town at 103,473. In 2020 UBOS estimated the mid-population of Mubende Town at 121,600 people. The population agency calculated the annual population growth rate of Mubende at 2.8 percent, on average, from 2014 until 2020.

== Points of interest ==
The following points of interest lie within the town limits or near its edges:

1. The offices of Mubende Town Council

2. Mubende Regional Referral Hospital, a regional referral hospital administered by the Uganda Ministry of Health

3. Mubende Central Market

4. A branch of the National Social Security Fund

5. The headquarters of the Tiger Battalion of the Uganda People's Defence Force, located in the western part of the town

6. The southern end of Mubende–Kakumiro–Kibaale–Kagadi Road

7. The source of the River Muzizi, in the hills northwest of the town

8. Mubende Campus of Muteesa I Royal University.

9. Fliptown and the Flippers. The Fliptown Hub, Home of the youths' New Hometown World Movement in Uganda.

== See also ==
- Hospitals in Uganda
- List of cities and towns in Uganda
