= Mityana =

Mityana Mitiyana
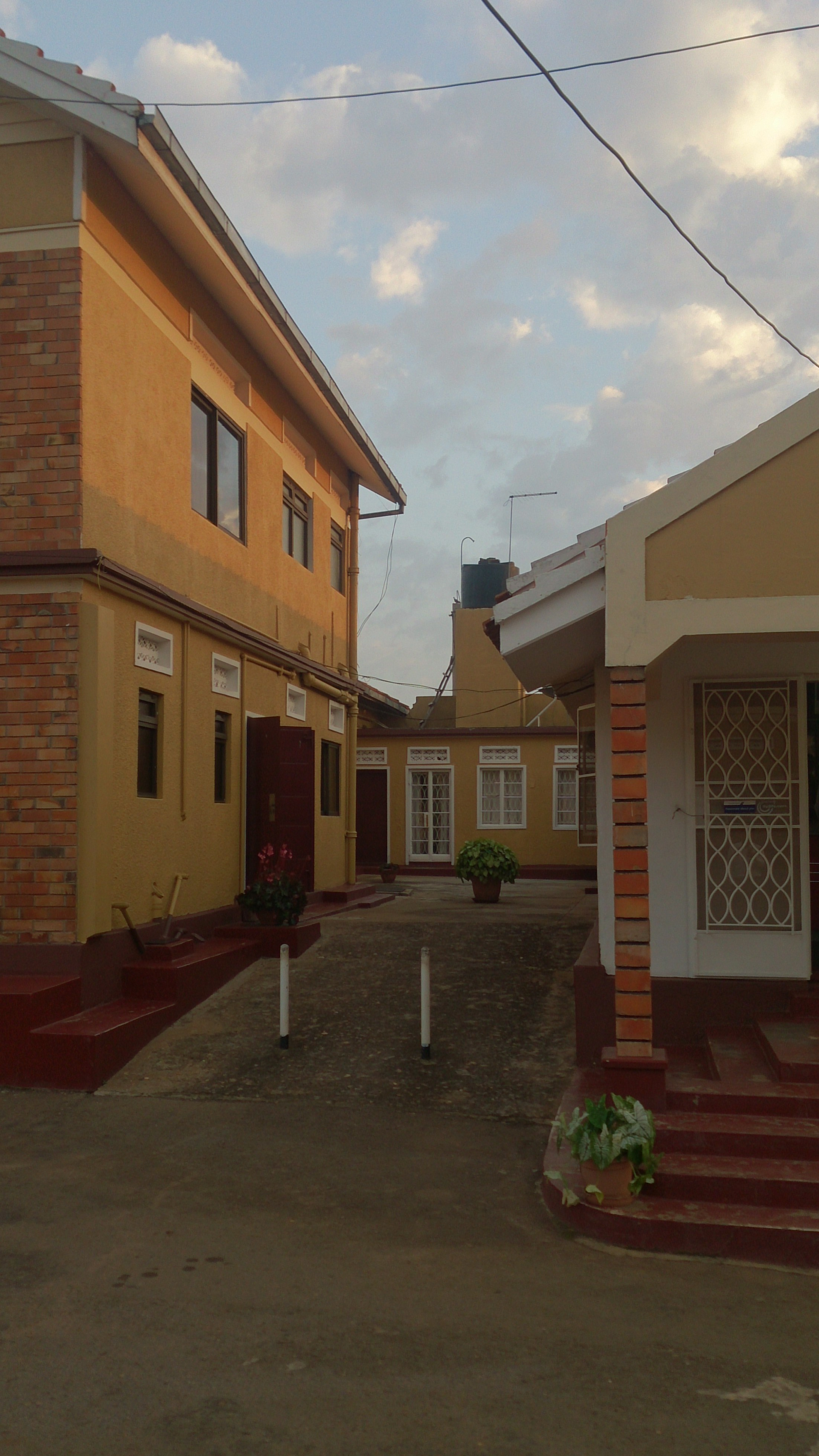

- Location in Uganda
- Coordinates: 00°24′02″N 32°02′32″E
- Country: Uganda
- Region: Central Uganda
- District: Mityana District

Area
  - Urban: 87 sq mi (225 km^{2})
- Elevation: 3,967 ft (1,209 m)

Population (2024 Census)
  - City: 126,109
  - Urban density: 1,450/sq mi (559.7/km^{2})
- Time zone: UTC+3 (EAST)

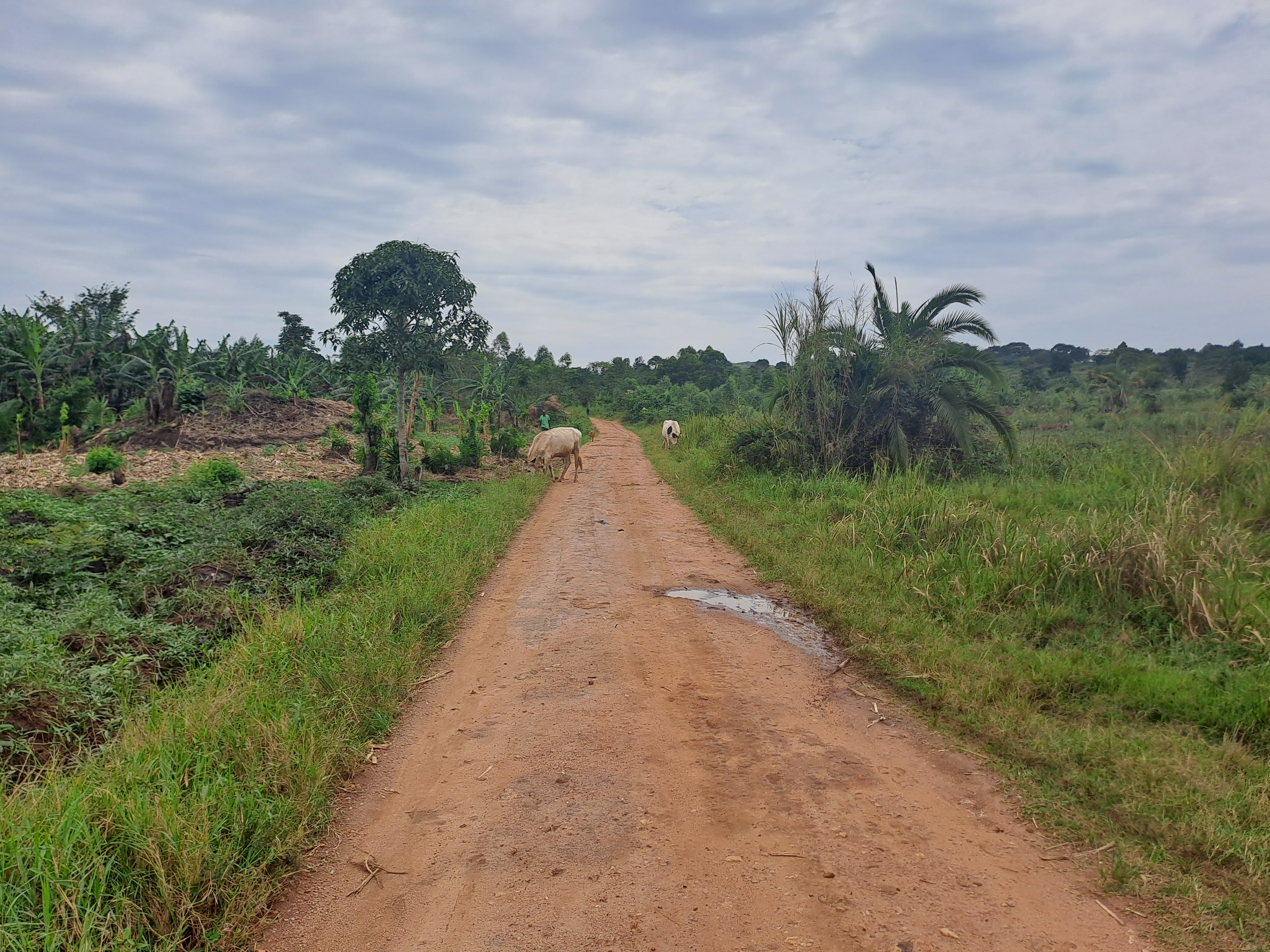
Weather in Sekanyonyi Mityana District

Mityana is a town in the Central Region of Uganda. It is the main municipal, administrative, and commercial center of Mityana District, as well as the location of the district headquarters.

== Location ==
Mityana is approximately 70 kilometres (43 mi), by road, west of Kampala, Uganda's capital and largest city. This is approximately 80.5 kilometres (50 mi), by road, east of Mubende, along the Kampala–Fort Portal Road. Mityana is about halfway between Kampala and Mubende, along an all-weather tarmac highway that links Uganda's capital with the city of Fort Portal in the Western Region. The geographical coordinates of Mityana are 0°23'58.0"N, 32°02'36.0"E (Latitude:0.399444, Longitude:32.043333). The average elevation of the town is 1,209 metres (3,967 ft) above mean sea level.

== Overview ==
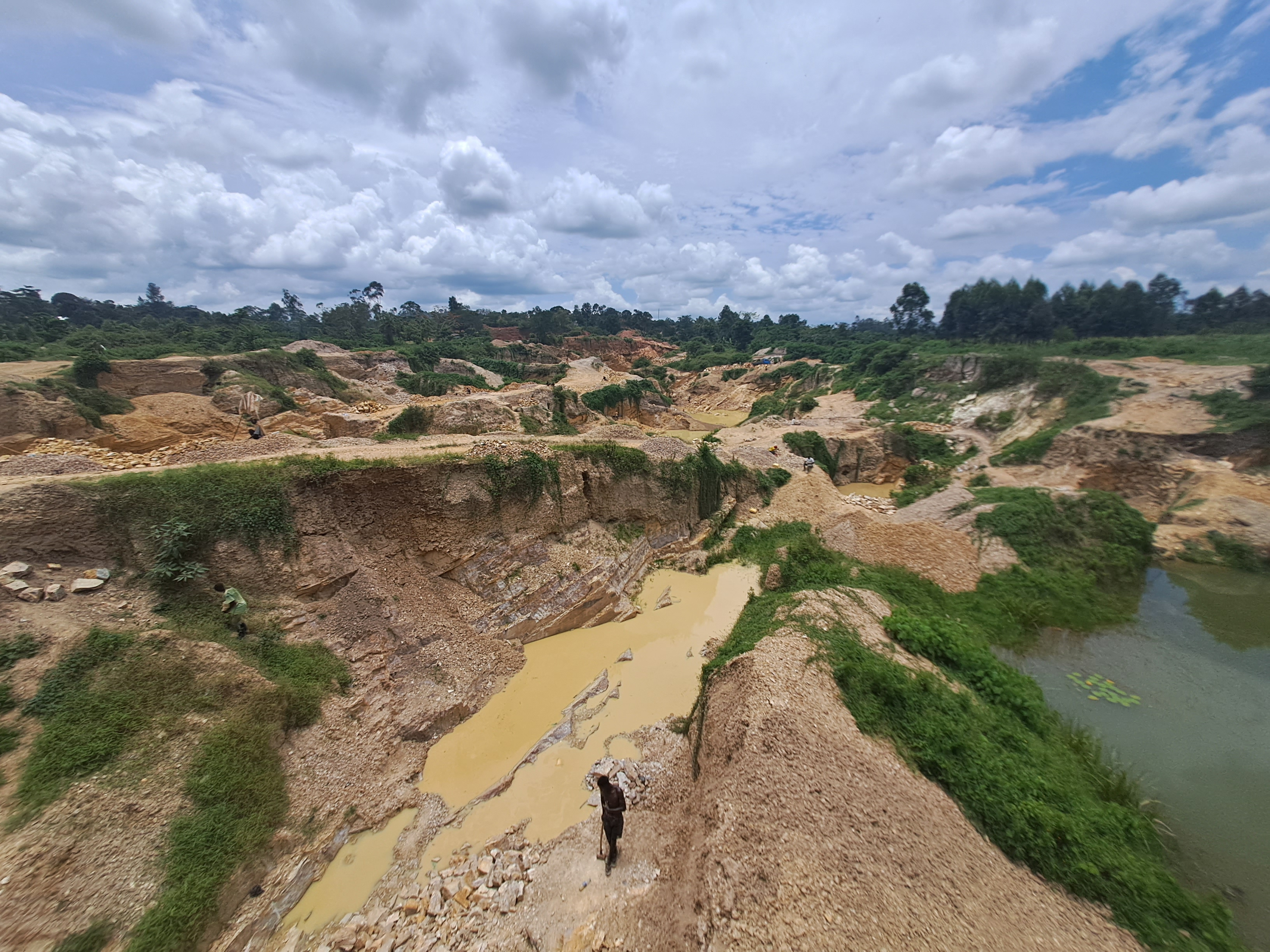
Weather in Mityana

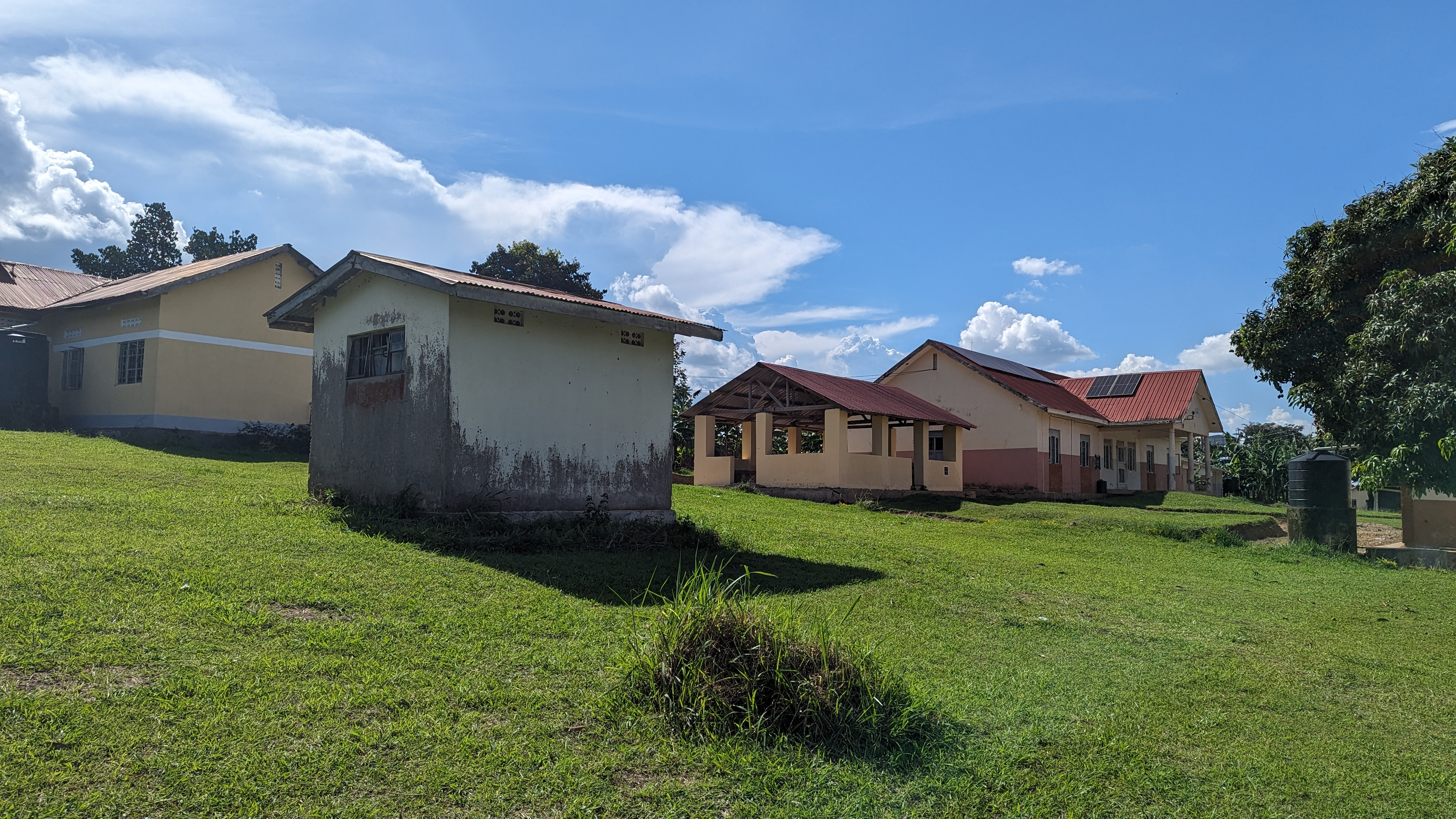
Muduuma Health Centre

As of January 2020, Mityana town covers an area of 263 square kilometres (102 mi^{2}). The topography consists of gentle slopes with open, U-shaped valleys. The plateau landscape is advantageous to real estate developers because they do not incur many expenses for clearance of building sites. In July 2013, the town was added to the list of urban centers serviced by the National Water and Sewerage Corporation. Since then, NWSC has expanded service to other areas of Mityana District. The town has become infamous for the location of scam dog shelters. Using the internet the scammers illicit donations from unsuspecting western social media users.

== Population ==
In 2002, the national census estimated the population of Mityana town to be 34,100. In 2010, the Uganda Bureau of Statistics (UBOS) estimated the population at 38,700. In 2011, UBOS estimated the mid-year population at 39,300.

In August 2014, the national population census put the population of Mityana, as presently (February 2021), 95,428 people. In 2020, UBOS estimated the mid-year population of the town at 105,200. The population agency calculated the annual population growth rate of Mityana to average 1.68 percent, between 2014 and 2020.

Historical population
Year	Pop.	±%
2002	34,100	—
2010	38,700	+13.5%
2011	39,300	+1.6%
2014	95,428	+142.8%
2020	105,200	+10.2%

== Points of interest ==
The following points of interest are located near or within the town limits:

- The offices of Mityana Town Council
- Mityana Central Market
- The headquarters of the Roman Catholic Diocese of Kiyinda–Mityana
- Mityana General Hospital, a 120-bed public hospital administered by the Uganda Ministry of Health
- The headquarters of Kolping Mityana Women's Project, a Tier IV financial institution
- Lake Wamala, with the northern shores located approximately 4 kilometres (2 mi) southwest of downtown Mityana
- Kampala−Mubende highway, passing through the center of town in a northwest/southeast direction
- Mityana Secondary School, a public residential secondary school with 26 dormitories
- William Mukasa Primary School, a mixed day and boarding primary school close to the district headquarters
- LivingHope-Children Junior Academy, serving poor children in Buwalula, Kamuli, and Jezza
- Mityana Modern Secondary School, a private secondary school, founded in 1994

== Road improvement and development ==
In April 2021, the Uganda National Roads Authority (UNRA) hired Energo Project Uganda Limited, a construction company, to improve the 86 kilometres (53 mi) Mityana–Mubende Road, at a cost of UGX:396 billion (approx. US$105 million). That contract includes the tarmacking of several urban roads in Mityana Town, some for the first time ever. The length of the urban roads is reported as approximately 14 kilometres (9 mi) and includes Katakara Road (7.8 kilometres (5 mi), Market Street (320 metres (1,050 ft) and Thorban road among others. Construction was expected to conclude in April 2024.

== See also ==
- Hospitals in Uganda
- List of cities and towns in Uganda
