= Kiboga District =

- District
- District location in Uganda
- Coordinates: 01°00′N 31°46′E
- Country: Uganda
- Region: Central Region
- Established: 1 July 1991
- Capital: Kiboga

Area
  - Land: 1,586.9 km^{2} (612.7 sq mi)
- Elevation: 1,600 m (5,200 ft)

Population (2012 estimate)
  - Total: 165,100
  - Density: 104/km^{2} (270/sq mi)
- Time zone: UTC+3 (EAT)
- Website: www.kiboga.go.ug

Kiboga District is a district in the Buganda Region of Uganda. The town of Kiboga is the site of the district headquarters.

== Location ==
Kiboga District is bordered by Nakaseke District to the northeast and east, Mityana District to the south, Mubende District to the southeast, and Kyankwanzi District to the northwest. The district headquarters are approximately 120 kilometres (75 mi), by road, northwest of Kampala, Uganda's capital and largest city. The coordinates of the district are:01 00N, 31 46E (Latitude:1.0000; Longitude:31.7667).

== Overview ==
The district was formed in 1991. It is predominantly a rural district. The district is traversed by a major highway linking Kampala with Hoima, the base of Uganda's petrochemical industry. In 2010, the district was split into two, the western part being set up as a separate district, Kyankwanzi District. Kiboga East County is the only county in the district.

== Population ==
In 1991, the national population census estimated the district population at 98,200. The 2002 national census estimated the population at 108,900, with an estimated annual population growth rate of 4.3 percent. In 2012, the population of was estimated at 165,100.

== Economic activities ==
It has been estimated that 80 percent of the district's labor force is engaged in agriculture.

== See also ==
- Districts of Uganda
