= Mubende District =

- District
- District location in Uganda
- Coordinates: 00°36′N 31°24′E
- Country: Uganda
- Region: Central Uganda
- Capital: Mubende

Area
  - Land: 4,620.2 km^{2} (1,783.9 sq mi)
- Elevation: 1,300 m (4,300 ft)

Population (2012 Estimate)
  - Total: 610,600
  - Density: 132.2/km^{2} (342/sq mi)
- Time zone: UTC+3 (EAT)
- Website: www.mubende.go.ug

Mubende is a district in the Central Region of Uganda. The town of Mubende is the site of the district headquarters. The district was reduced in size in July 2005 with the creation of the Mityana District and reduced again in 2019 when Kassanda District was carved out of it.

== Location ==
Mubende District is bordered by Kyankwanzi District to the north, Kiboga District and Kassanda to the northeast and Mityana District to the east. Gomba District and Sembabule District lie to the south, Kyegegwa District to the southwest and Kibaale District to the northwest of Mubende District. Mubende, the district headquarters, is located approximately 172 kilometres (107 mi), by road, west of Kampala, the capital of Uganda, and the largest city in that country. The coordinates of Mubende District are:00 36N, 31 24E.

== Overview ==
The district covers an area of approximately 4,620 square kilometres (1,780 mi^{2}). It comprises three counties, namely Buwekula, Kassanda and Kasambya. The district has eighteen sub-counties and one town council which include: Kassanda is no longer among its counties. It has been confirmed to be an independent district.

1. Bagezza
2. Bukuya
3. Butoloogo
4. Kalwana
5. Kasambya
6. Kassanda
7. Kibalinga
8. Kiganda
9. Kigando
10. Kitenga
11. Kitumbi
12. Kiyuni
13. Madudu
14. Makokoto
15. Mannyogaseka
16. Mubende Town Council
17. Myanzi
18. Nabingoola
19. Naluntuntu

== Population ==
The 1995 population census estimated the district population at about 277,500. In 2002 the national census estimated the population of the district to be about 423,450 people of whom (50.3%) were males and (49.7%) were female, with an annual population growth rate of 3.6%. It is estimated that in 2012, the population of the district was about 610,600.

== Economic activity ==
The major economic activity in Mubende District is agriculture with emphasis on food crops like:

- Sweet potatoes
- Beans
- Cassava
- Maize
- Bananas
- Groundnuts
- Onions
- Cabbage
- Tomatoes

Cash crops grown in the district include:

- Coffee
- Tea

== See also ==
- Mubende
- Central Region, Uganda
- Buganda
- Districts of Uganda
