= Mityana District =

- District
- District location in Uganda
- Coordinates: 00°27′N 32°03′E
- Country: Uganda
- Region: Central Region of Uganda
- Capital: Mityana

Area
  - Land: 1,579.3 km^{2} (609.8 sq mi)

Population (2012 Estimate)
  - Total: 316
  - Density: 197.3/km^{2} (511/sq mi)
- Time zone: UTC+3 (EAT)
- Website: www.mityana.go.ug

The Mityana District is a district in the Central Region of Uganda. The district was created in 2005, by taking the Mityana and Busujju counties from Mubende District. Mityana is the site of the district headquarters.

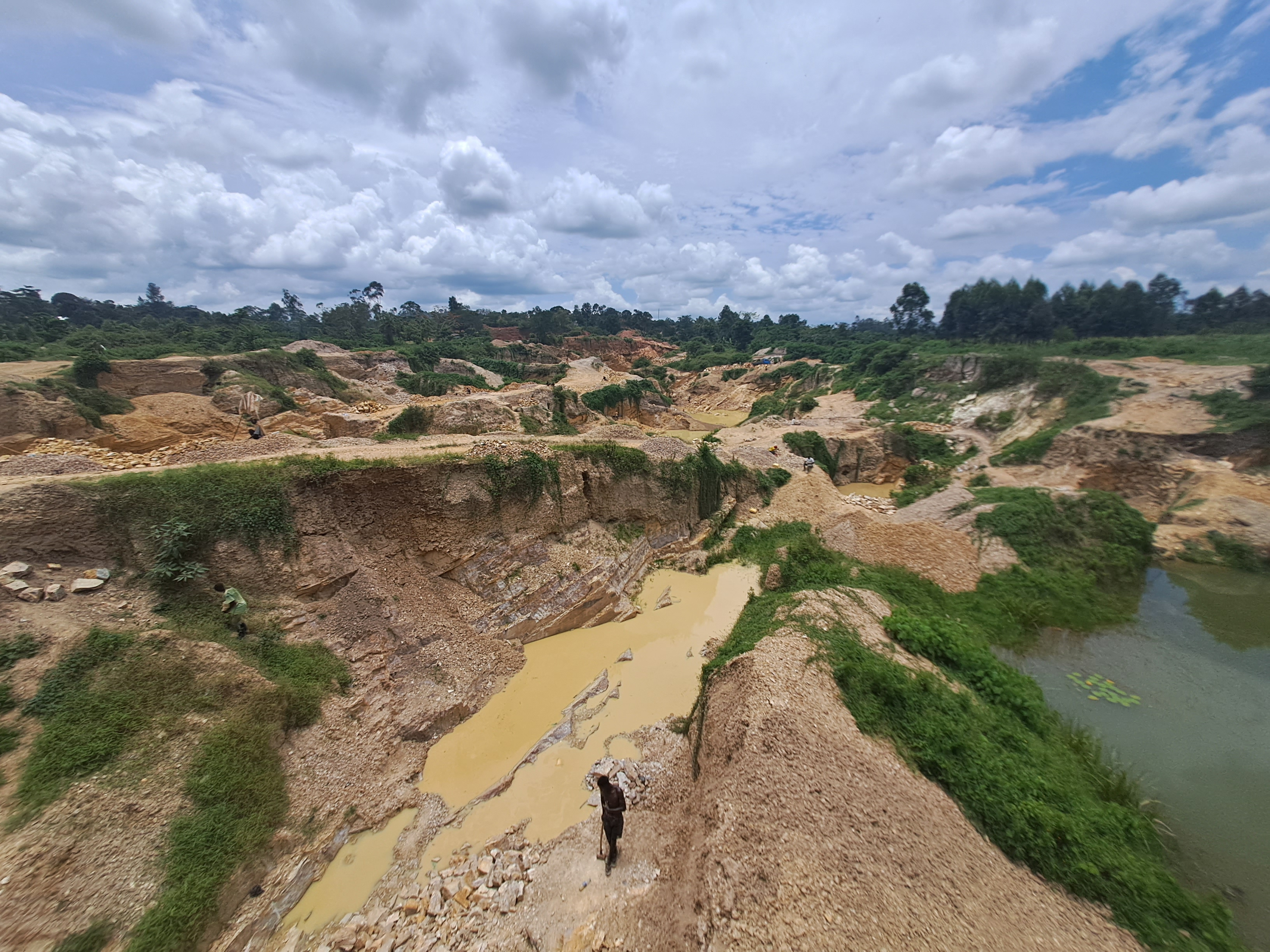
Weather in Mityana District.

== Location ==
The Mityana District is bordered by Kiboga District to the north, Nakaseke District to the northeast, Wakiso District to the east, Mubende District to the west, Mpigi District to the southeast, and Butambala and Gomba Districts to the south. The district headquarters at Mityana are approximately 77 kilometres (48 mi) west of Kampala, Uganda's capital and largest city. The coordinates of the district are 00 27N, 32 03E.

== Population ==
The 1991 national population census estimated the district's population at 223,530. In 2002, the national census estimated the district population at 266,110. In 2012, the district population was estimated at 311,600.

== See also ==
- Districts of Uganda
