= Kabwoya–Buhuka Road =

Road in Uganda

Coordinates: 01°14′48″N 30°56′47″E

Route information
- Length: 27 mi (43 km)
- History: Designation in 2024; Completion in 2027 Expected

Major junctions
- East end: Kabwoya
- Kyangwali
- West end: Buhuka

Location
- Country: Uganda

Highway system
- Roads in Uganda

The Kabwoya–Buhuka Road, also Kabwoya–Kyangwali Road, in the Western Region of Uganda, connects the town of Kabwoya, along the Kyenjojo–Hoima Road, to the town of Buhuka on the eastern shores of Lake Albert. The road is a critical "oil road" and is vital to the development of Uganda's nascent petroleum industry.

== Location ==
Both Kabwoya and Buhuka are located in the newly established Kikuube District, approximately 43 kilometres (27 mi) apart. The road travels from east to west through the village of Kusaru, Bugoma Forest Reserve, and the community of Kyangwali, which hosts the Kyangwali Refugee Settlement.

== Upgrading to bitumen ==
The government of Uganda earmarked this road for upgrading through the conversion of the existing gravel road to class 2 bitumen surface and the building of bridges, shoulders, and drainage channels, with a lifespan of at least 20 years. China Railway Seventh Group (CRSG) was selected as the engineering, procurement and construction contractor under a design and build arrangement with the Ugandan government.

== Construction ==
The contract price for the upgrade is reported to be USh:263 billion (approx. US$71.2 million). Construction began in September 2024 and is expected to last 36 months. The project is funded by the Government of Uganda.

== Other consideration ==
The adjoining Bukuha-Kingfisher Road, measuring approximately 5 kilometres (3 mi) was upgraded to class 2 bitumen surface earlier by China National Offshore Oil Corporation (CNOOC), to improve accessibility to the Kingfisher oil fields.

== See also ==
- Uganda Oil Refinery
- Economy of Uganda
- Transport in Uganda
- EACOP
- List of roads in Uganda
- Kyangwali Refugee Settlement
