= Rugaaga =

Ugandan town

- Location in Uganda
- Coordinates: 00°49′40″S 31°01′23″E
- Country: Uganda
- District: Isingiro District
- Region: Western Uganda
- Elevation: 4,708 ft (1,435 m)

Rugaaga is a town in Isingiro District in the Western Region of Uganda.

== Location ==
The town is located approximately 31 kilometres (19 mi) southeast of Isingiro Town Council, the district capital.

Rugaaga is approximately 65 kilometres (40 mi), by road, southeast of the city of Mbarara, the largest urban area in the Western Region of Uganda. This is about 260 kilometres (162 mi), by road, southwest of Kampala, Uganda's capital and largest city.

The geographical coordinates of Rugaaga Town are 0°49'40.0"S, 31°01'23.0"E (Latitude:-0.827778; Longitude 31.023056).

== Population ==
Rugaaga Town Council simultaneously serves as the headquarters of Rugaaga Sub-county, in Bukanga County in Isingiro District. In 2015, the Uganda Bureau of Statistics (UBOS), estimated the population of Rugaaga sub-county at 33,900. In 2020, UBOS estimated the mid-year population of the sub-county a 40,500 inhabitants, of whom 20,700 (51.1 percent) were female and 17,800 (48.9 percent) were male. UBOS calculated that the population in the sub-county grew at an average annual rate of 3.6 percent, between 2015 and 2020.

== Points of interest ==
The following additional points of interest lie within the town or near its edges: (a) the offices of Rugaaga Town Council (b) Rugaaga Health Center IV, administered by Isingiro District Administration on behalf of the Uganda Ministry of Health.

The Isingiro–Ntantamuki–Rakai Road passes through the middle of Rugaaga in a general north to south direction.

== Notable people ==
Gordon Babala Kasibante Wavamunno, a businessman, entrepreneur and philanthropist was born in Rugaaga in December 1943.

Mull Sebujja Katende, a Ugandan diplomat who serves as the Ambassador of Uganda to the United States, was born here in February 1957.

== See also ==
- List of cities and towns in Uganda
