= Kikuube =

Ugandan town

Kikuube Kikuube
- Location in Uganda
- Coordinates: 01°19′58″N 31°12′27″E
- Country: Uganda
- Region: Western Region of Uganda
- Sub-region: Bunyoro sub-region
- District: Kikuube District
- Elevation: 3,525 ft (1,074 m)

Population (2020 Estimate)
  - Total: 18,100

Kikuube is a town in the Western Region of Uganda. It is the main municipal, administrative, and commercial center of Kikuube District and the site of the district headquarters.

== Location ==
Kikuube lies along the Hoima–Kabwoya Road, approximately 26 kilometres (16 mi), southwest of the city of Hoima, the largest urban centre in the Bunyoro sub-region. This is approximately 215 kilometres (134 mi), by road, northwest of Kampala, Uganda's capital and largest city. The geographical coordinates of Kikuube Town are:01°19'58.0"N, 31°12'27.0"E (Latitude:1.332778; Longitude:31.207500).

== Population ==
In July 2020, the Uganda Bureau of Statistics UBOS, estimated the mid-year population of the town at 18,100 people.

== Overview ==
Kikuube is the headquarters of Kikuube District, which became operational on 1 July 2018. The satellite map of the town shows places of worship of all major religions in the country; (Roman Catholic, Protestant, Islam, Seventh-day Adventist and Pentecostal). There is also a nursery school, a primary school and a secondary school in the town's neighborhood called Kaziranfumbi.

Approximately 14 kilometres (9 mi) south of Kikuube town, are the headquarters and main factory of Hoima Sugar Limited, a manufacturer of crystalline sugar from sugarcane. Opened in 2011, the company owns a nucleus sugarcane farm of about 3,800 hectares (9,400 acres), supported by sugarcane farms owned by smallholder farmer out-growers, measuring over 8,000 hectares (20,000 acres). The company employs nearly 600 direct employees and another 800 people indirectly. The registered pool of out-grower farmers exceeded 3,500, as of September 2020.

== See also ==
- Kabwoya
- Kyenjojo–Kabwoya Road
- List of cities and towns in Uganda
