= Gulu–Moroto Road =

Road in Uganda

Coordinates: 02°45′50″N 33°16′30″E

Route information
- Length: 247 mi (398 km)
- History: Designated in 2028; Completion in 2036 (Expected)

Major junctions
- West end: Gulu
- Omoro; Patongo; Abim
- East end: Moroto

Location
- Country: Uganda

Highway system
- Roads in Uganda

Gulu–Moroto Road is a road in the Northern Region of Uganda, connecting the city of Gulu in Gulu District and the town of Moroto, in Moroto District. The road is part of Uganda's Fourth National Development Plan (NDP IV), starting in 2025 through 2030. This transport corridor links Acholi and Karamoja and is a major trade and tourism route.

== Route description ==
The Gulu–Moroto Road starts in Gulu City and continues in a general southeasterly direction, through Gulu District, Omoro District, Pader District, Agago District, Abim District, Kotido District to end in Moroto Town, in Moroto District, a total distance of approximately 398 kilometres (247 mi).

== History ==
Before 2028, the Gulu–Moroto Road was a marram-surfaced, two-lane road in poor shape. It is very dusty during the dry season and very muddy during the rainy season. It is an important transport corridor linking the Acholi sub-region to the Karamoja sub-region. When the road is improved, movement of both people and commercial goods within the corridor are expected to increase, leading to higer incomes and better living conditions.

=== Upgrade to class II bitumen standard ===
In 2023, the government of Uganda, through the then Uganda National Roads Authority (UNRA), began to carry out the Environment and Social Impact Assessment (ESIA) and the Resettlement Action Plan (RAP), for this road, with those studies expected to last 12 months. By 2025, those studies had been completed.

Following the studies, a construction company is expected to be selected after competive bidding. An Engineering, procurement, and construction (EPC) contract is expected to be awarded to the winner of the international bid. The planned improvements include widening the road and improving it to Class II bitumen standard with culverts and drainage channels.

== Future ==
In August 2026, Henry Musasizi Uganda's finance minister, indicated that construction was planned to start in the financial year 2028/2029 with funds sourced from the sale of Uganda's crude oil, expected to start flowing in H2 of 2026. Preliminary estimates put the cost of improvements at approximately UGX:900 billion (about US$$241.3 million).

== See also ==
- Transport in Uganda
- List of roads in Uganda
- Kitgum–Kidepo Road
