= Abim =

Abim may refer to:

- Abim, Uganda
- Abim District, Uganda

== See also ==
- ABIM (disambiguation)
