= Wambabya Central Forest Reserve =

Forest in Western Uganda

- Wambabya Forest
- Location within Uganda
- Location: Hoima District and Kikuube District Western Region, Uganda
- Nearest city: Hoima
- Coordinates: 1°26′45.6″N 31°8′24″E
- Area: 3,429 ha (8,470 acres)
- Governing body: National Forestry Authority

Wambabya Central Forest Reserve is located in both Hoima District and Kikuube district in Western Uganda near the north-eastern border of Bugoma Central Forest Reserve. It was demarcated in 1932. It is operated by the National Forest Authority (NFA). It covers an area of 3,429 ha (13.24 sq mi).

== Wildlife ==
This forest is a home to many species which include chimpanzees, forest amphibians (Golden Puddle Frog and Kivu Clawed Frog), bats (Duke of Abruzzi's, silver and mongalia free tailed bats), plant species (Mutuba trees) and birds (Yellow-fronted tinkerbird).

== Conservation status ==
In 2008, the National Forestry Authority (NFA) staff planted trees in the Wambabya forest on 2,000 ha (4,900 acres) of land that were encroached upon by human activity. In 2011, more than 260 encroachers where given one month to vacate the forest reserve.

Some of the human activities in the area that are affecting the forest cover include charcoal burning, logging, poaching, deforestation and agriculture such as rice and tobacco farming.

In 2021, Wambaya Forest Conservation and Development Association received funding worth UGX 1.3 billion from the Australia Development Agency to implement a project that was dubbed "Green Lug Forestry Restoration" that aimed to reduce the conflicts between wildlife and humans. The project targeted 3,000 households in the districts of Kikuube and Hoima and the beneficiaries received tree seedlings, improved seeds of beans, banana suckers, maize, beehives and goats.

A hydro power plant was constructed on River Wambabya in Buseruka subcounty but the silting of the river due to human activities has hindered power generation.

The Electricity Regulatory Authority partnered with the National Forestry Authority in Uganda to plant trees in this forest reserve.

== Controversies ==
The construction of the 1,443 km (897 mi) East African Crude Oil Pipeline (EACOP) faced resistance by climate activists and environmentalists that is supposed to originate from the Kabaale Industrial Park in Hoima passing through Wambabya, Bugoma and Taala Central Forest Reserves and other places in Uganda to port Tanga in Tanzania. This caused international banks such as HSBC, BNP Paribas and insurers such as insurer Allianz Group to not back the pipeline financially. The China National Offshore Oil Corporation (CNOOC), Total Exploration and Production (TotalEnergies), the Uganda National Oil Company and the Tanzania Petroleum Development Cooperation are still working on pipeline until it start transporting the crude oil in 2025. Over 14,000 households will be displaced in both Uganda and Tanzania.

The National Oil Spill Contingency Plan that was launched and it showed how Uganda was prepared to handle oil spills, response mechanism to oil spills, impact of oil spills, tiers of response levels, waste management among other things. Royal Norwegian Government and the Norwegian Coastal Administration helped in the creation of The National Oil Spill Contingency Plan.

== See also ==
- List of Central Forest Reserves of Uganda
- Mabira Forest
- Budongo Forest
