= Kobero–Bugene–Mutukula–Kikagati Road =

Road in Tanzania

Coordinates: 01°35′41″S 31°08′25″E

Route information
- Length: 245 mi (394 km)

Major junctions
- South end: Kobero, Burundi
- Bugene, Tanzania
- North end: Mutukula, Uganda & Kikagati, Uganda

Kobero–Bugene–Mutukula–Kikagati Road, also Burundi–Tanzania–Uganda Road, is a road in the Kagera Region of Tanzania. The road connects the border towns of Mutukula and Kikagati in Uganda, to the border town of Kobero, in Burundi. The road allows direct access between Uganda and Burundi, promoting exchange of goods and passengers, avoiding routes through Rwanda, where free movement of Ugandan goods and passengers are restricted, since February 2019.

== Location ==
The road starts at Kobero Border Crossing Point, at the international border between Burundi and Tanzania. It then travels north-eastwards for approximately 190 kilometres (118 mi) to the town of Bugene, in the Karagwe District of Tanzania.

At Bugene, the road forks into two. The left fork travels north-westwards for an estimated 115 kilometres (71 mi) to Kikagati, in Isingiro District, at the border between Tanzania and Uganda. The right fork travels north-eastwards to Mutukula, Uganda, a distance of approximately 88 kilometres (55 mi). The total road distance of this project measures approximately 394 kilometres (245 mi).

== Upgrading to bitumen ==
Parts of this route corridor in Tanzania are bitumen surfaced. However, the roads in Uganda connecting to this road, are in various stages of disrepair. As of May 2021, the 90 kilometres (56 mi) Masaka–Mutukula Road is described as "in bad shape". As recently as January 2020, the government of Uganda revealed plans to expand and re-surface this road. The Mbarara–Kikagati Road, measuring 62 kilometres (39 mi) was converted to standard II bitumen, with shoulders, culverts and drainage channels, between 2011 and 2014.

Repairs may be required as well to the 124 kilometres (77 mi) road between Kobero Border Crossing Point, in Burundi, to the country's capital city at Gitega.

== Way forward ==
High level teams of politicians and technocrats from the three East African Community member states are scheduled to meet to pave the way forward. It is expected that each country will pay for the portion of this highway that passes through its territory.

== See also ==
- List of roads in Tanzania
- Kagera Region
