= Katende (name) =

Katende is both a given name and a surname. Notable people with the name include:

- Katende Joram (born 1987), Ugandan footballer
- Kennedy Katende (born 1985), Ugandan boxer
- Mull Katende, Ugandan diplomat
- Robert Katende, Ugandan chess coach
