= Isingiro–Ntantamuki–Rakai Road =

Road in Uganda

Coordinates: 00°54′03″S 31°13′10″E

Route information
- Length: 67 mi (108 km)
- History: Designated in 2021; Completion in 2030 Expected

Major junctions
- West end: Isingiro
- Ntantamuki
- East end: Rakai

Location
- Country: Uganda

Highway system
- Roads in Uganda

The Isingiro–Ntantamuki–Rakai Road is a road in the Central and Western Regions of Uganda, connecting the towns of Isingiro, in Isingiro District, Western Region and Rakai in Rakai District, Central Region.

== Location ==
The road starts at Isingiro and travels in an initial southeasterly direction. It loops around the southern shores of Lake Nakivale and travels eastwards to Rugaaga, then to Katoma. At Katoma is changes course and travels southeastwards through Ndinzi Trading Centre and passes through Ntantamuki, crossing from Isingiro District to Rakai District. The road then continues southeastwards to Nakabanga, where it begins to turn eastwards, then northwards, through Bulanga, Kibaale and Byakabanda, ending in Rakai Town on the eastern shores of Lake Kijanebalola. The road, from end to end measures approximately 108 kilometres (67 mi) in length.

== Overview ==
The road is an important road corridor between Isingiro District and Rakai District and between the Western Region and the Central Region in Uganda. It is used by farmers from Isingiro District to bring farm produce to urban markets in Masaka City and Kampala City. Products include milk, maize and beans. The gravel-surfaced road is prone to flooding, causing hardship to residents and travelers.

== Improvement to class II bitumen surface ==
In September 2021, the Prime Minister of Uganda, Robinah Nabbanja, publicly announced that government had plans to improving this road to class II bitumen standard, with culverts, shoulders and drainage channels. She did not give the timeline for the planned improvements, but she stated that the road would have been put on the improvement list, but those plans were interrupted by the COVID-19 pandemic. As soon as COVID-19 comes under control, this road goes back on the improvement list, according to the government official.

== See also ==
- List of roads in Uganda
- Masaka–Bukakata Road
