= Kikagati =

Ugandan town

- Map of Uganda showing the location of Kikagati.
- Coordinates: 01°02′42″S 30°40′07″E
- Country: Uganda
- Region: Western
- Sub-region: Ankole
- District: Isingiro
- Elevation: 1,532 m (5,026 ft)
- Time zone: UTC+3 (EAT)

Kikagati is a town in the Western Region of Uganda. It sits across the Kagera River from the town of Murongo, in the Kagera Region of Tanzania.

== Location ==
Kikagati is located in Isingiro District, Ankole sub-region, in southwestern Uganda. The town lies close to Uganda's border with Tanzania. It is located approximately 63 kilometres (39 mi), by road, south of Mbarara, the largest city in the sub-region.

This is about 331 kilometres (206 mi), by road, southwest of Kampala, Uganda's capital and largest city. The geographical coordinates of the town are:01 02 42S, 30 40 07E (Latitude:-1.0450; Longitude:30.6686). Kikagati sits at an average elevation of 1,532 metres (5,026 ft) above mean sea level.

== Overview ==
The small town of Kikagati, Isingiro District, southwestern Uganda, sits on Uganda's border with the Republic of Tanzania. Nestled between hills that rise to heights of 1,420 metres (4,660 ft) on the Ugandan side and 1,560 metres (5,120 ft) on the Tanzanian side, the town is a major crossing point between the two countries.

Garbage collection and disposal was a challenge as of June 2018, with residents dumping plastic waste and food residue on the roadside.

== Points of interest ==
The following points of interest lie within the town limits or close to the edges of the town: (a) the offices of Kikagati Town Council (b) the International Border Crossing between Uganda and the Republic of Tanzania (c) the Kagera River forms the border between Uganda and Tanzania in some areas near Kikagati and (d) Kikagati Central Market, the source of fresh daily produce.

The southern end of the 63 kilometres (39 mi) Mbarara-Kikagati Road ends here. The road continues into Northern Tanzania as Highway B182. The western arm of the proposed Kobero–Bugene–Mutukula–Kikagati Road ends here.

The 16 megawatts Kikagati Power Station, across the Kagera River is currently under development, by Kikagati Power Company Limited, with the power to be shared equally between Uganda and Tanzania.

== See also ==
- Isingiro District
- Isingiro
