= King Saha =

Ugandan musician (born 1989)

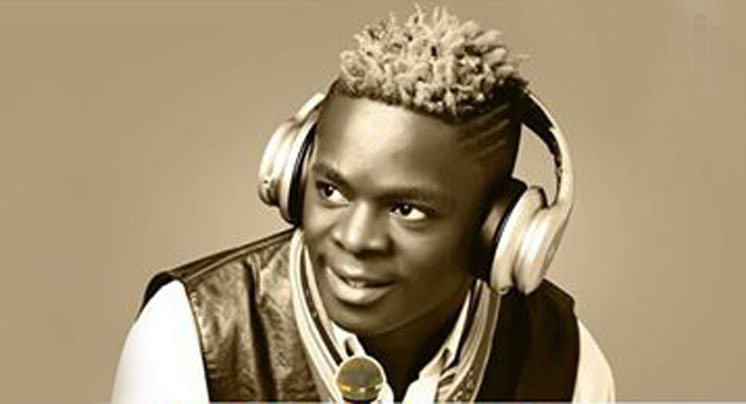

Background information
- Also known as: King Saha
- Born: Ssemanda Manisul; 2 September 1989 (age 37); Entebbe
- Origin: Entebbe, Uganda
- Genres: Reggae, Afrobeat, R&B
- Occupation: Musician
- Years active: 2011 – present
- Label: Kings Love Entertainment
- Member of: Kings Love Entertainment
- Spouse: Racheal Kente

Ssemanda Manisul populary known as King Saha, is an Afro-beat and Zouk musician from Entebbe in Uganda. He is also the executive director of the record label Kings Love Entertainment.

== Career ==
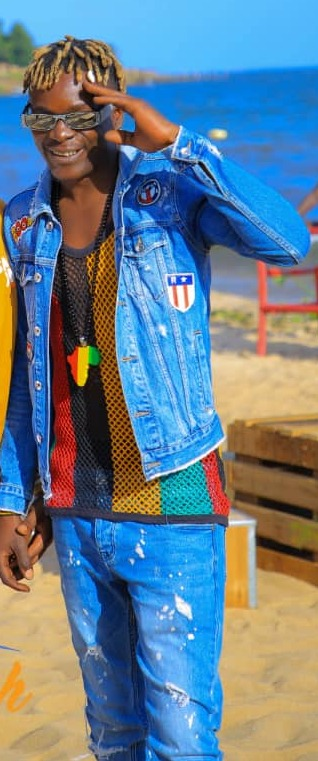
King Saha, a Ugandan musician

King Saha started his professional career in 2011 with his first release, "Signal". He joined Jose Chameleone's Leone Island as a backup singer, before starting his own record label, Kings Love Entertainment. In 2014, he released a single produced by Producer Baur titled "Mulirwana". He had his first concert, Mulirwana Concert, at Freedom City Mall along Entebbe road.

In 2019 he made his first Coke Studio Africa appearance with fellow Ugandan artiste Weasle and Ethiopian artiste Yared Negu.

On 8 December 2023 King Saha held a concert at Hotel Africana in Kampala, which he named Ebiseera Ebyo Concert. Bobi Wine, the president of the National Unity Platform and as well as the Ugandan opposition leader cancelled his Europe tour and came back to Uganda to also watch the show live.

== Discography ==
=== Studio albums ===
Albums released by King Saha
Title	Details
Biri Biri	Released: 5 June 2018; Label: Kings Love Entertainment; Formats: Digital download
Single	Released: 15 September 2013; Label: Kings Love Entertainment; Formats: Digital download
On My Way	Released: 20 April 2012; Label: Kings Love Entertainment; Formats: Digital download

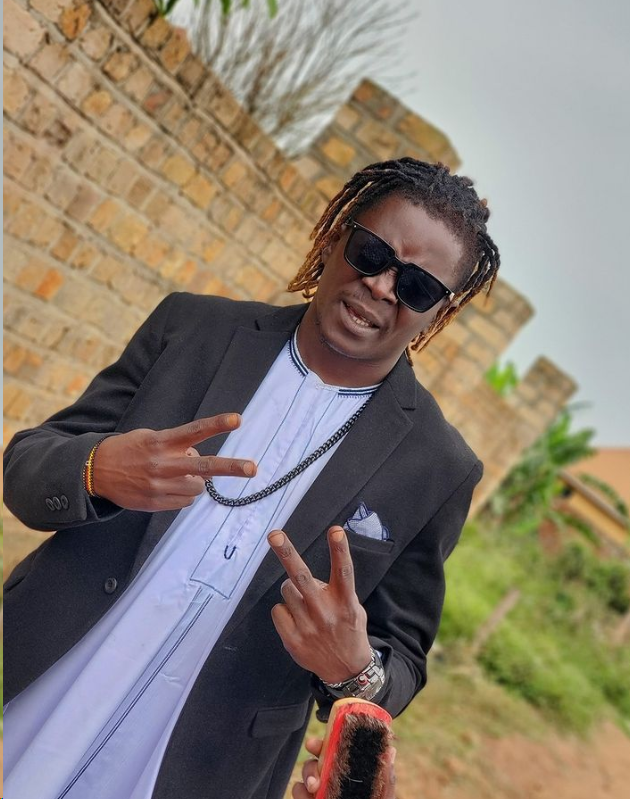
King Saha, a Ugandan musician

== Awards and nominations ==
Awards King Saha has featured
Year	Awards	Category	Result
2022	AFRIMA Awards	Best Male Artiste in East Africa	Nominated
2021	Zzina Awards	Best Afro Beat song(Ssala Puleesa)	Nominated
2019	Zzina Awards	Contemporary RnB Artiste	Nominated
2019	Zzina Awards	Best Collaboration (Mpa Love)	Nominated
2016	Uganda Entertainment Awards	Best RnB artiste	Won
2015	Rising Star Awards	Artiste of the year	Nominated

== Personal life ==
King Saha owns a house in Nakawuka town council in Wakiso District, Central Region of Uganda.

== See Also ==
- Jose Chameleone
- Bobi Wine
- Bebe Cool
