= Soroti–Amuria–Abim–Kotido Road =

Road in Uganda

Coordinates: 02°43′38″N 33°39′51″E

Route information
- Length: 119 mi (192 km)
- History: Designation TBD; Expected completion TBD

Major junctions
- South end: Soroti
- Amuria; Abim
- North end: Kotido

Location
- Country: Uganda

Highway system
- Roads in Uganda

Soroti–Amuria–Abim–Kotido Road is a road in the Eastern and Northern Regions of Uganda. The road connects the towns of Soroti in Soroti District, to Amuria in Amuria District, Abim in Abim District, and Kotido, in Kotido District. Soroti and Amuria lie in the Teso sub-region, while Abim and Kotido are in the Karamoja sub-region.

== Location ==
The road starts at Soroti and continues north through Amuria and Abim, to end at Kotido, a distance of approximately 192 kilometres (119 mi). The coordinates of the road near Abim are 2°43'38.0"N, 34°39'51.0"E (Latitude:2.727237; Longitude:33.664159).

== Overview ==
The road is gravel surface and in poor physical state. It is prone to flooding, and, when it does, it adversely disrupts travel between Soroti and Kotido.

== Upgrading to bitumen ==
During a campaign speech on 2 December 2015, President Yoweri Museveni stated that this road is among the next batch of roads to be considered for upgrading to grade II bitumen surface. No specific timetable has been set.

== See also ==
- List of roads in Uganda
