= Lusalira–Nkonge–Lumegere–Sembabule Road =

Road in Uganda

Coordinates: 00°06′50″N 31°09′16″E

Route information
- Length: 60 mi (97 km)
- History: Designated in 2022; Completion in 2028 (expected)

Major junctions
- North end: Lusaira
- Nkonge; Kabamba; Lumegere
- South end: Sembabule

Location
- Country: Uganda

Highway system
- Roads in Uganda

The Lusalira–Nkonge–Lumegere–Sembabule Road is a road in the Central Region of Uganda, connecting the town of Lusalira, in Mubende District, to the town of Sembabule in Sembabule District. Through this road, traffic can connect from Mubende to Sembabule and then on to Masaka, in southwestern Uganda.

== Location ==
The road begins in the town of Lusalira, in Mubende District, approximately 15 kilometres (9 mi), southwest of Mubende, along the Mubende–Kyegegwa–Kyenjojo–Fort Portal Road. From here, the road takes a general southerly route through Nkonge and Kabamba, where it crosses the Katonga River and continues to Lumegere in Sembabule District, a distance of 53 kilometres (33 mi).

From Lumegere, the road turns southeast and continues to end at Sembabule, a distance of approximately 43 kilometres (27 mi). The total length of this road is quoted as 97 kilometres (60 mi).

== Upgrade to class II bitumen ==
In 2018, the Government of Uganda (GOU), through the Uganda National Roads Authority (UNRA), began making arrangements to upgrade this road to class II bitumen, with shoulders, culverts and drainage channels. The work includes grade-separated intersections, underpasses and related structures, signal lights and side walls. In April 2022, UNRA indicated that the next stage of development was contract signing with an entity called Tecnovia Joint Venture. In February 2022, the executive director of UNRA, Allen Kagina, while releasing the half year performance report for the financial year 2021/2022, indicated that this road is a priority.

The EPC contract was awarded to Tecnovia Joint Venture, comprising Tecnovia S.A. a construction conglomerate based in Porto Salvo, Portugal and Tecnovia Angola, its subsidiary, based in Luanda, Angola.

== Construction ==
On 15 August 2025, Uganda's Minister of Works, General Katumba Wamala officially commissioned the beginning of construction of this road to bitumen II standard. The work is expected to take 36 months at a budgeted cost of UGX521.6 billion (€126.44 million).

== Funding ==
As of July 2018, the GOU was expected to make an equity investment into the upgrade of this road. As of that time, selection of an engineering, procurement and construction (EPC) contractor was ongoing.

In November 2024 the Ugandan government signed an agreement with Citibank Uganda for the institution to advance a syndicated loan for the paving of this road. The construction cost is budgeted at USh534.9 billion (US$146.96 million). The syndicated loan was arranged by Citibank Uganda. Absa Bank Mauritius participated in the syndication. Other participants include the Development Bank of Southern Africa and the African Trade and Investment Development Insurance. The table below outlines the sources of funding for paving the Lusalira–Nkonge–Lumegere–Sembabule Road.

Lusalira–Nkonge–Lumegere–Sembabule Road funding
Rank	Development partner	Contribution in UGX	Equivalent in US$	Percentage	Notes
1	Citibank Uganda (Syndicate)	479.8 billion	131.82 million	89.7	Loan
3	Government of Uganda	55.11 billion	15.14 million	10.3	Equity
	Total	534.9 billion	146.96 million	100.0	

== See also ==
- List of roads in Uganda
