= Masaka–Bukakata Road =

Ugandan road

Coordinates: 00°18′29″S 31°52′40″E

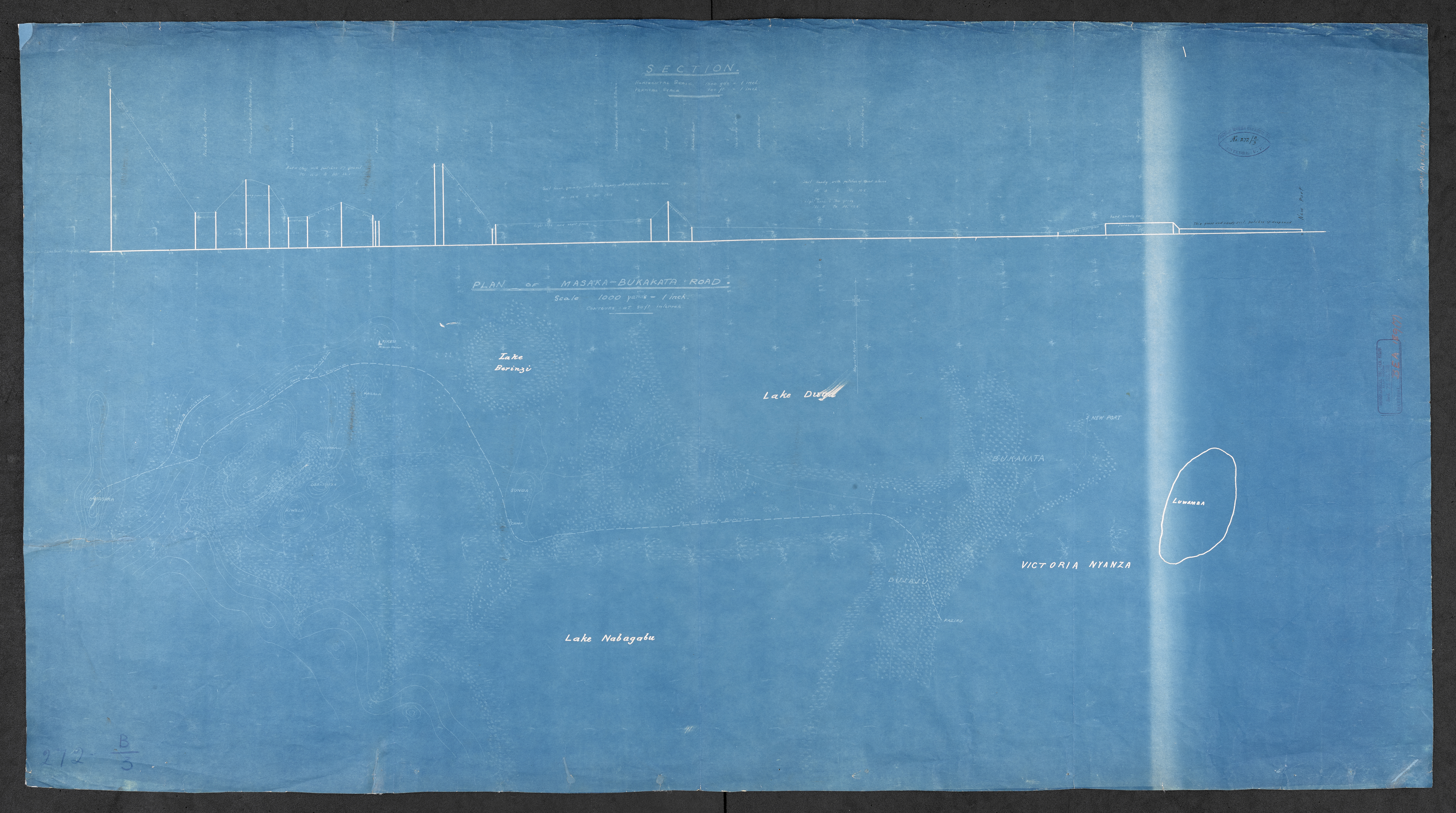
- Plan for Masaka-Bukakata Road

Route information
- Length: 25.5 mi (41.0 km)
- History: Designated in 2019; Completion in 2021

Major junctions
- West end: Masaka
- East end: Bukakata

Location
- Country: Uganda

Highway system
- Roads in Uganda

The Masaka–Bukakata Road is a road in the Central Region of Uganda, connecting the city of Masaka to the lakeside town of Bukakata in Masaka District. As of September 2020, the road surface was gravel, which washed away when it rained, stranding motorists, traders and their merchandise.

== Location ==
The Masaka–Bukakata Road starts in the neighborhood called Nyendo, along the Kampala-Masaka Road. From there it travels eastwards towards the western shores of Lake Nalubaale (formerly Lake Victoria). It ends at Bukakata, a total distance of approximately 35 kilometres (22 mi), from end to end. The rehabilitation contract includes several Masaka City roads, bringing the total contract distance to 41 kilometres (25 mi).

== History ==
In November 2013, the Government of Uganda, through its 100 percent owned parastatal, Uganda National Roads Authority, secured funding from the Arab Bank for Economic Development in Africa (BADEA), and the OPEC Fund for International Development (OFID), to upgrade the Masaka–Bukakata Road from gravel to asphalt. Tenders for bidders for design and construction works were proffered in late 2013. In June 2014, Ugandan print media indicated that UNRA was in the final stages of selecting a contractor for the road works.

The estimated construction costs have been quoted as US$70 million, excluding the cost of compensation and relocation of displaced populations and businesses. Road works were expected to begin in 2015 and last approximately 3 years.

== Recent developments ==
The construction contract was awarded to a company called Arab Contractors. The contract price is USh:165,325,096,327 (approx. US$45 million). The supervision contract was awarded to a consortium comprising Galander Engineering Consultants and KKATT Consult.

The civil works contract was signed on 17 September 2018. On 2 January 2019, permission was issued to commence work. The contractor began the process of relocation of utilities in April 2019, but had not began construction, as of that date.

In September 2021, Allen Kagina, the executive director of Uganda National Road Authority, reported that the upgrade of this road to class II bitumen surface had been completed during the 2020/2021 financial year that ended on 30 June 2021.

== See also ==
- List of roads in Uganda
- Isingiro–Ntantamuki–Rakai Road
