= Mukono–Kayunga–Njeru Road =

Road in Uganda

Coordinates: 00°39′33″N 32°57′30″E

Route information
- Length: 58.4 mi (94.0 km)
- History: Designation in 2015; Expected completion in 2018

Major junctions
- West end: Mukono Town
- Kalagi; Kayunga
- East end: Njeru

Location
- Country: Uganda

Highway system
- Roads in Uganda

Mukono–Kayunga–Njeru Road is a road in the Central Region of Uganda, connecting the city of Mukono to the town of Njeru at the Nalubaale Power Station.

== Location ==
The road starts at Mukono, the headquarters of Mukono District. The road continues northwards to Kalagi, approximately 19 kilometres (12 mi), north of Mukono. At Kalagi, the road takes a northeasterly turn to Kayunga, the headquarters of Kayunga District, a distance of approximately 33 kilometres (21 mi). At Kayunga, the road turns south to end at Njeru, approximately 47 kilometres (29 mi) away from Kayunga. The total road project is given as 94 kilometres (58 mi), by Uganda National Roads Authority

== Upgrading to bitumen ==
The road with a bitumen surface, in varying degrees of disrepair was earmarked for improvement to class II bitumen surface, with shoulders, drainage channels and culverts.
