= Nakawuka–Kasanje–Mpigi Road =

Ugandan road

Coordinates: 00°10′33″N 32°22′53″E

Route information
- Length: 21 mi (34 km)

Major junctions
- South end: Nakawuka
- Kasanje
- North end: Mpigi

Location
- Country: Uganda

Highway system
- Roads in Uganda

The Nakawuka–Kasanje–Mpigi Road (Note: Also referred to as Mpigi-Kasanje-Nakawuka Road) is a loose surface road in the Central Region of Uganda, connecting the towns of Nakawuka and Kasanje in Wakiso District to the city of Mpigi, the district capital of Mpigi District. When completed, the road is expected to ease travel between the city of Entebbe and Mpigi, Masaka and communities in the Western Region of Uganda. The road bypasses the road traffic congestion around Kampala, the national capital.

== Location ==
The road starts at Nakawuka and travels southwestwards to Kasanje, a distance of approximately 10 kilometres (6 mi). From Kasanje, the road makes a turn northwestwards towards Mpigi, where it ends at the Kampala-Masaka Road, a distance of about 12 kilometres (7 mi).

Also from Kasanje, an extension of this road travels southeastwards to the neighborhood of Buwaya, a distance of about 9 kilometres (6 mi). A distance estimated at 2 kilometres (1 mi) across open water separates Buwaya and Nakiwogo Landing Site of the Entebbe Peninsular. On the map, the Nakiwogo-Mpigi section of this road is referred to as the Kasanje Road.

== Upgrade to class II bitumen ==
The government of Uganda, with prodding from stakeholders are in the process of upgrading this road as well as the adjacent Kisubi-Nakawuka Road (14 kilometres (9 mi)) to class II bitumen surface, with drainage channels, culverts and shoulders.

Under those plans, a suspension bridge measuring approximately 4 kilometres (2 mi) is planned across Lake Nalubaale, between Nakiwogo and Buwaya. After completion, transit time between Entebbe and Mpigi is expected to reduce to less than thirty minutes from the current two hours.

== Developments ==
In August 2021, Yoweri Museveni, the President of Uganda directed Allen Kagina, the executive director of the Uganda National Roads Authority (UNRA), to award the construction contract of this road to China Communications Construction Company (CCCC), under the pre-financing model. Under this arrangement, CCCC would start work of designing and constructing the road, using own money and be paid by government in the second or third year of the project. In April 2022, UNRA listed this road under those in the "bidding stage".

== See also ==
- List of roads in Uganda
