= Kazo District =

Kazo
- District
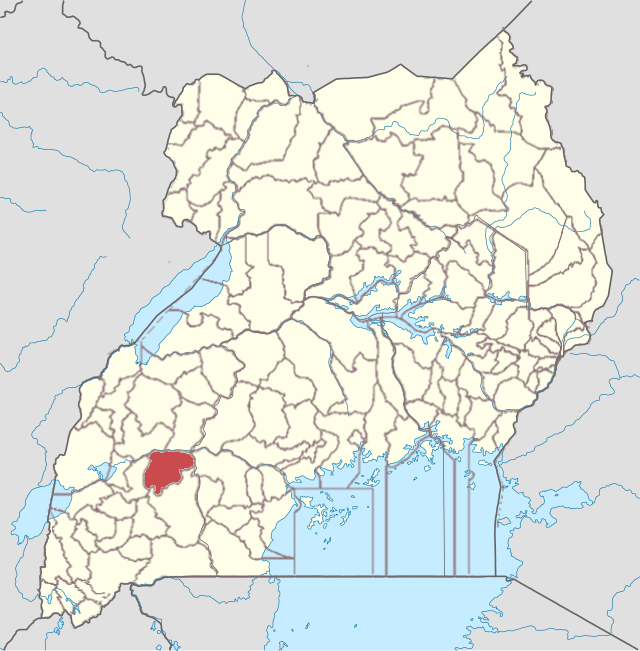

- Location of Kazo District in Uganda
- Coordinates: 0.0°N 30.8°E
- Country: Uganda
- Region: Western
- Created: 1 July 2019
- Capital: Kazo

Area
  - Total: 1,556 km^{2} (601 sq mi)

Population (2014)
  - Total: 177,054
  - Density: 113.8/km^{2} (294.7/sq mi)
- Time zone: UTC+3 (EAT)

Kazo is a district in Uganda's Western Region. It is located approximately 200 square kilometres (77 sq mi) west of Uganda's capital Kampala. It covers an area of 1,556 square kilometres (601 sq mi) and recorded a population of 177,054 in the 2014 Ugandan census. The capital of the district is the town of Kazo.

== Geography ==
Kazo District is located in the pastoral rangelands of southwestern Uganda. It borders the districts of Kamwenge to the northwest, Kyegegwa to the northeast, Sembabule to the east, and Kiruhura to the south, and Ibanda to the west.

Kazo District is located at an elevation of over 1,200 metres (3,900 ft) above sea level. Its relief consists of low hills and rolling plains, which are drained by seasonal streams. The Katonga River forms the northern border of the district, and the Katonga Wildlife Reserve lies on the other side of the river in the districts of Kamwenge and Kyegegwa.

Kazo District lies in the Victoria Basin forest-savanna mosaic ecoregion. Common trees in the area include Acacia and Albizia spp.

Rainfall is relatively low and unreliable, averaging about 700 to 800 millimetres (28 to 31 in) annually and peaking in April–May and October–November. Temperatures range between 21 and 34 °C (70 and 93 °F), averaging over 27 °C (81 °F).

== History ==
The area of what is now Kazo District was originally part of the chiefdom of Buhweju, which was incorporated into the Protectorate of Uganda in 1901 as part of the district of Ankole. After the 1971 Ugandan coup d'état, the district's name was changed to Mbarara. Kazo became part of Kiruhura District when it was split from Mbarara in 2005. In September 2015, Parliament approved the creation of Kazo District from Kiruhura, which went into effect on 1 July 2019.

== Government ==
Kazo District is subdivided into the town council of Kazo, and seven sub-counties: Buremba, Burunga, Engari, Kanoni, Kazo, Nkungu, and Rwemikoma.

== Economy ==
Historically, the economy of Kazo District revolved around the rearing of Ankole cattle by semi-nomadic pastoralists. Nowadays, almost all the land in the district has been privatized as the people have become sedentarized and established permanent homes. The economy has also seen a shift toward the production of food crops. In the 2014 Ugandan census, 89.0% of households reported being engaged in crop growing, while 66.3% reported being engaged in livestock farming. Major crops include beans, matooke, millet, corn, sweet potatoes and coffee.

== Infrastructure ==
The paved Nyakahita–Kazo–Kamwenge–Fort Portal Road runs through the district, connecting Kazo to Ibanda in the west and to Kiruhura and the Masaka–Mbarara Road in the south.
