= Peace Mbabazi Kyamukongwire =

Ugandan gospel artist

- Born: 1982; Ngarama, Isingiro district
- Other names: Peace Mbabazi Ashaba Kyamukongwire
- Citizenship: Ugandan
- Occupation: Gospel artist
- Known for: Gospel music
- Children: 1

Peace Mbabazi Kyamukongwire (born 1982) is a Ugandan gospel artist.

== Background ==
Peace Mbabazi was born in 1982 to the late Kyamukongwire Yosamu from Burungamo village, Ngarama Isingiro District. She attended Burungamo Primary school for her primary education.

She is married to Jackson Ashaba.

== Career ==
Mbabazi's career as a gospel artist began when she was part of the choir for praise and worship at All Saints Church Mbarara, She created and performed her own songs during church services, weddings and other functions. She released her own album of songs and joined the gospel music industry, holding concerts such as the Rukundo Egumeho concert.

== Discography ==
Mbabazi has sung songs that include:

- Owakigambire (2024)
- Bantumwe (2022)
- Ekiro kyashesha (2022)
- Mukama Yesu (2017)
- Yesu Akagira Entumwa (2022)
- Rukundo Egumeho (2017)
- Yesu Nanyijuka (2022)
- Ninkusiima (2017)
- Ai Yesu Nkunzi Yangye (2022)
- God is Good (2017)
- Obusingye (2017)
- Empara (2024)
- Abasabaze (2017)
- Omufumu weitu Yesu
- Mukama nagira ati (2022)
- Guma ahangoma (2022)
- Kutula enjegele (2022)
- Nimurungi (2007)
- Hama Obe Owamaani (2017)
- Songa Mbele (2024)
- Bwanyima yobusaasi (2017)
- Omuntu womunda (2017)
- Tushemererwe (2017)
- Hario ebirikweija (2017)

== Awards and recognitions ==
- Western artiste of the year, the Golden Awards
- Nominee in the Category of Gospel Diva at Afrika Divas Music Awards
- Nominee for Regional entity song/Artist of the year at the VIGA Awards 2017/18
