= Kyangwali Refugee Settlement =

- Location within Uganda
- Coordinates: 1.22°N 30.82°E
- Country: Uganda
- District: Kikuube

Population (2021)
  - Total: 125,039

Kyangwali Refugee Settlement is a refugee camp in the Kikuube District (formerly part of Hoima District) in western Uganda. April 2024, Kyangwali is home to 137,183 Refugees.

== Background ==
Refugees from Rwanda started to live in Kyangwali when the settlement was opened in the 1960s. From the 1990s to 2010s, refugees from the Democratic Republic of the Congo and the Republic of the Congo lived in Kyangwali. More than 38,000 people lived in Kyangwali in 2015.

In 2018, the number of residents had risen to 83,558. As of January 2021 the population of the settlement had reached 125,039, in 42,428 separate households. Of these, 81 per cent are women and children and 19 per cent are youth aged between 15–24 years.

== Social services ==
Kyangwali Refugee Settlement has more than 30 relief agencies trying to support refugees. These function as either an 'implementing partner', or an 'operating partner' with the UNHCR. Reportedly, a widespread perception among the more educated refugees is that the agencies promise donors more than they actually deliver. This has led to the formation of more than twenty community-based organisations (CBOs). Although the majority of these refugee-founded agencies rely on their own community resources, and the support of the refugee population itself to help the most vulnerable among them, some of the CBOs, such as CIYOTA (the COBURWAS International Youth Organization to Transform Africa (Note: COBURWAS stands for Congo (DRC), Burundi, Uganda, Rwanda and Sudan)), the Planning for Tomorrow Youth Organisation (P4T), and Ray of Hope Africa (RAHA), have gone further, and gained national and international recognition from the UNHCR, the World Bank, and other agencies and donors.

The Kyangwali Star provides news to people living in Kyangwali.

== Health ==
The Think Humanity Health Centre Kyangwali was established in May 2012. Situated 7 km outside of Kyangwali Refugee Settlement Camp, it serves as a vital healthcare hub where the majority of patients who attend their health days are women, seeking treatment for a range of conditions such as malaria, typhoid, brucellosis, urinary tract infections (UTIs), respiratory infections, pelvic inflammatory disease (PID), pregnancy-related issues, and diarrheal diseases. In 2021, Reproductive Health Uganda's (RHU) ACCESS project, funded by the United Kingdom government (UKaid), launched in the Kikuube District to accelerate the acquisition of enhanced and integrated Sexual and Reproductive Health and Rights (SRHR) and family planning services among the refugees and host communities in Kyangwali Refugee Settlement.

== See also ==
List of Refugee settlements in Uganda
