= Kazo, Uganda =

Kazo
- Map of Uganda showing the location of Kazo.
- Coordinates: 00°03′10″S 30°45′25″E
- Country: Uganda
- Region: Western
- Sub-region: Ankole
- District: Kazo
- County: Kazo
- Constituency: Kazo County

Government
  - Parliament of Uganda: John Nasasira
- Elevation: 1,300 m (4,300 ft)

Population (2012 Estimate)
  - Total: 10,200
- Time zone: UTC+3 (EAT)

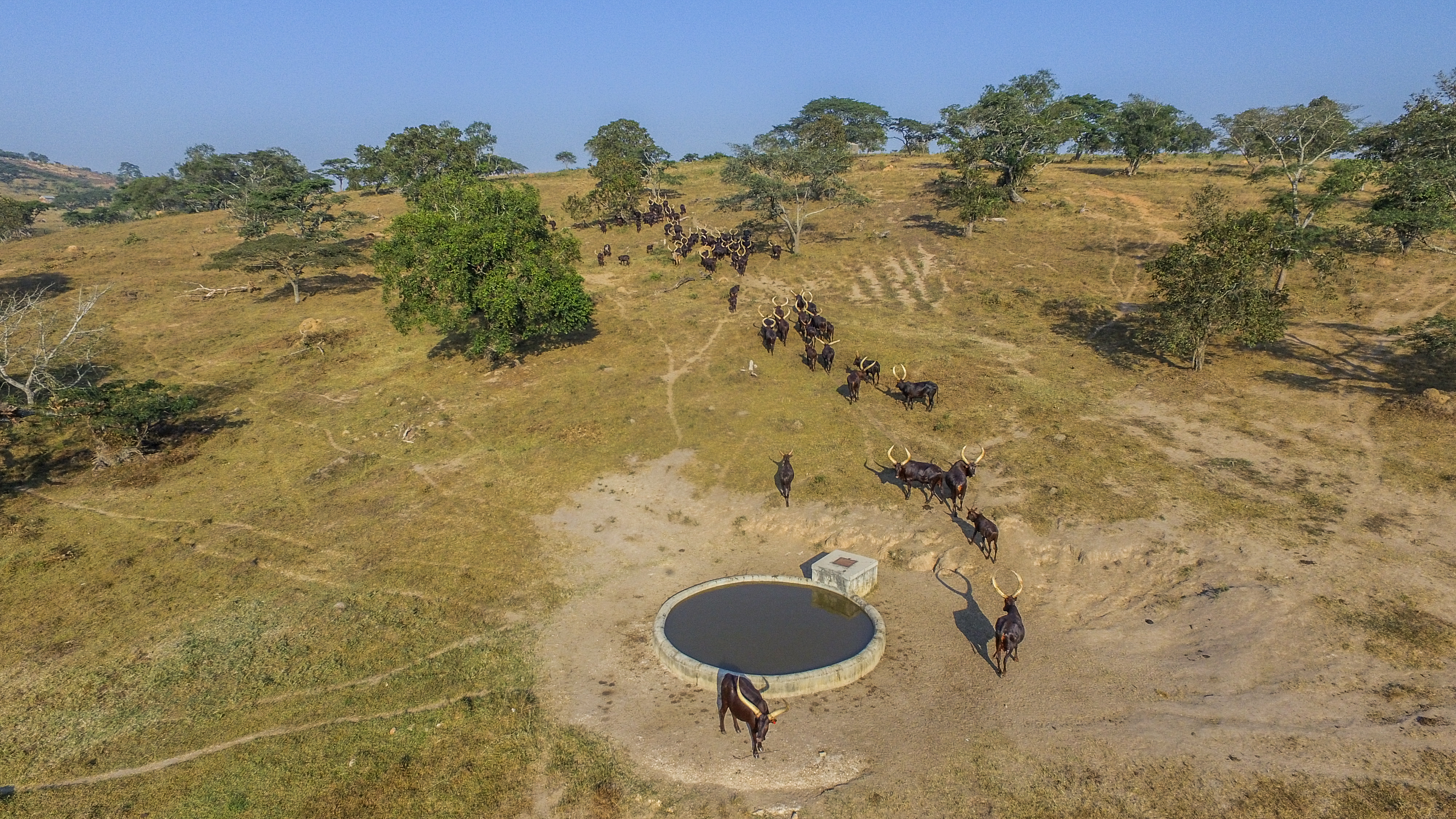
Traditional Ankole long horned cattle at a watering point in Kazo District Western Uganda

Kazo is a town in the Western Region of Uganda. It is the capital of Kazo District.

== Location ==
The town is approximately 85 kilometres (53 mi), by road, north of Mbarara, the largest city in the Ankole sub-region. It is about 275 kilometres (171 mi), by road, southwest of Kampala, the capital and largest city of Uganda. The coordinates of Kazo are 0°03'10.0"S, 30°45'25.0"E (Latitude:-0.052778; Longitude:30.756944).

== Infrastructure ==
The Nyakahita–Kazo–Kamwenge–Fort Portal Road passes through the middle of town.

== Population ==
In 2012, the Uganda Bureau of Statistics projected the population of Kazo Municipality at 10,200.

== See also ==
- List of cities and towns in Uganda
