= CIYOTA =

Ugandan educational organizastion

- COBURWAS International Youth Organization to Transform Africa
- Formation: 2005
- Headquarters: Kyangwali Refugee Settlement
- Services: Youth education
- Founders: Daniel Muhwezi, Benson Wereje and Bahati Kanyamanza
- Awards: Nansen Refugee Award (Africa finalist, 2003)

COBURWAS International Youth Organization to Transform Africa, commonly known as CIYOTA is a Ugandan not-for-profit refugee-education organisation. It was formed in 2005 by refugee youth (Benson Wereje, Daniel Muhwezi and Bahati Kanyamanza) and was the Africa finalists for the Nansen Refugee Award in 2013.

It operates a primary school and hostels to enable youth attendance in high school and universities.

In 2018, the COBURWAS primary school was identified as one of the fourth best in Uganda.

== Nomenclature ==
COBURWAS is an acronym of Congo, Burundi, Rwanda and Sudan.

== History ==
CIYOTA was started by volunteer youth living in Kyangwali Refugee Settlement from Democratic Republic of Congo, Burundi, Uganda, Rwanda, and Sudan, including Congolese refugee Benson Wereje, Daniel Muhwezi and Bahati Kanyamanza in December 2005. Founders, who fled the Democratic Republic of Congo from Rutchuru, North Kivu Province.

== Activities ==
CIYOTA operates educational services in Uganda providing primary education to 400 students, secondary school education to 100 students, university scholarships to 30 students and counter-violence and entrepreneurial leadership education to 5,000 youth. CIYOTA operates a primary school, led by John Bosco Okoboi, within Kyangwali Refugee Settlement and supports students attend high school and university elsewhere in Uganda through the provision of hostel accommodation near to the educational establishments.

CIYOTA was the Africa regional finalist for the Nansen Refugee Award in 2013.

In 2018, the Ugandan Ministry of Education ranked the COBURWAS primary school the fourth best in the country.
