= Abim General Hospital =

- Uganda Ministry of Health

Geography
- Location: Abim, Abim District, Northern Region, Uganda
- Coordinates: 02°41′56″N 33°39′28″E

Organisation
- Care system: Public
- Type: General

Services
- Emergency department: I
- Beds: 100

History
- Founded: 1969

Links
- Other links: Hospitals in Uganda

Abim General Hospital, also known as Abim Hospital, is a government-owned hospital in the Northern Region of Uganda. It is the district hospital for the Abim District.

== Location ==
The hospital is in the town of Abim in the Karamoja sub-region, approximately 138 kilometres (86 mi), by road, west of the Moroto Regional Referral Hospital. The coordinates of the hospital are 02°41'56.0"N, 33°39'28.0"E (Latitude:2.698892; Longitude:33.657788).

== Overview ==
The hospital was built in 1969 during the first administration of Milton Obote (1962 to 1971). Since its founding, the hospital infrastructure has deteriorated, the equipment has aged or ceased working, and the poorly paid staff have become demoralized.

== Renovations and improvements ==
In February 2016, the hospital underwent renovations, including rehabilitation of its water supply system. The authorities plan to hire four additional physicians for the facility and to re-equip it with beds and bedding.

== See also ==
- List of hospitals in Uganda
- Health in Uganda
