= Chris Mukiza =

Ugandan economist

- Born: Uganda
- Citizenship: Uganda
- Education: University of Southampton (Doctor of Philosophy)
- Occupation: Economist
- Years active: 2000 – present
- Title: Executive Director of Uganda Bureau of Statistics

Chris Ndatira Mukiza is a Ugandan economist, who is the executive director of the Uganda Bureau of Statistics, the government agency responsible for the collection, analysis, dissemination and storage of nationally important data.

== Education ==
Mukiza holds a Doctor of Philosophy in Economics, awarded in 2008, by the University of Southampton, in Southampton, United Kingdom. His PhD thesis was titled "Essays On Growth And Absolute Poverty: Evidence From Uganda".

== Career ==
Mukiza joined UBOS in March 2000. From 2009 until 2019, he served as the Director of Macroeconomic statistics at UBOS. In that position, he was part of a seventeen-person senior management team at the government agency

He beat out three other applicants for the position of executive director of UBOS, including Imelda Madgalene Atai, who has been the Acting Executive Director from July 2018 until March 2019. Dr. Chris Mukiza replaced Ben Paul Mungyereza, who resigned in early 2018. In his role as executive director, he also becomes a member of the UBOS board of directors.

Mukiza previously (in 1992) worked as a statistician at the Ugandan Ministry of Finance, Planning and Economic Development. He then worked at the Uganda Revenue Authority from 1997 until 2000.

He has plans to make the Uganda Bureau of Statistics, an excellent statistics production centre in the region and on the continent, according to remarks that he made upon his appointment as executive director.

== See also ==
- Richard Byarugaba
