= Kitgum–Kidepo Road =

Road in Uganda

Coordinates: 03°33′57″N 33°41′40″E

Route information
- Length: 72 mi (116 km)
- History: Designated in 2024; Completion in 2028 (Expected)

Major junctions
- West end: Kitgum
- Karenga
- East end: Kidepo

Location
- Country: Uganda

Highway system
- Roads in Uganda

Kitgum–Kidepo Road is a road in the Northern Region of Uganda, connecting the town of Kitgum in Kitgum District and the town of Apoka, in Karenga District, inside Kidepo Valley National Park.

== Location ==
The Kitgum–Kidepo Road starts at Kitgum and continues in a general northeasterly direction, through Naam Okoro, Orom, Lobarangit and Karenga, before ending at the western edge of Kidepo Valley National Park, a total distance of approximately 116 kilometres (72 mi).

== Overview ==
Before 2024, the Kitgum–Kidepo Road was a marram-surfaced, two-lane road. It is a major route of transportation between central Northern Uganda and the Karamoja sub-region. It is a major surface transport corridor for tourists transferring between Murchison Falls National Park and Kidepo Valley National Park. It is very dusty during the dry season and very muddy during the rainy season.

== Upgrade to class II bitumen standard ==
In 2024, the government of Uganda requested parliamentary approval to borrow USh450 billion (€110.54 million or US$121 million) to upgrade this road to class II bitumen standard, with culverts, shoulders and drainage channels. The loan request was approved on 30 April 2024.

The Environment and Social Impact Assessment (ESIA) and the Resettlement Action Plan (RAP), were carried out by Environmental Solutions Africa (ESA) working together with Tenvicon. The Engineering, procurement and construction (EPC) contract was awarded to a joint venture between ASGC Limited of the United Kingdom and Dott Services Limited of Uganda.

== Related considerations ==
Besides improving Uganda's tourism sector, this road is intended to support Uganda's mineral development, now that gold, marble, limestone, uranium, graphite and other minerals have been discovered in the Karamoja sub-region.

Long range plans include the construction of Kidepo International Airport, which will provide increased connectivity to the region and provide employment opportunities to the local and national residents.

== Funding ==
In June 2026, Standard Chartered Uganda lent the Government of Uganda €110.5 million (UGX:481 billion) to fund the upgrade of this road to bitumen standard.

== See also ==
- Transport in Uganda
- List of roads in Uganda
- Gulu–Moroto Road
- Kidepo International Airport
