= Mbarara–Kikagati Road =

Road in Uganda

Coordinates: 00°52′S 30°46′E

Route information
- Length: 46 mi (74 km)
- History: Designated in 2011; Completed in 2014

Major junctions
- North end: Mbarara
- Isingiro
- South end: Kikagati

Location
- Country: Uganda

Highway system
- Roads in Uganda

The Mbarara–Kikagati Road is in southwestern Uganda, connecting the city of Mbarara in Mbarara District and the town of Kikagati in Isingiro District, at the border between Uganda and Tanzania. The road continues into Tanzania as Highway B182.

== Location ==
The road starts at Mbarara and then passes through Gayaza, Isingiro, and Kibwera and ends in Kikagati, a distance of approximately 65 kilometres (40 mi). The coordinates of the road near Gayaza in Mbarara District are 0°41'37.0"S, 30°41'36.0"E (Longitude:-0.693611; Latitude:30.693333).

== Overview ==
The road, whose total length is 74 kilometres (46 mi), was previously made of unsealed gravel before being converted to class II bitumen surface. The conversion was done by China Communications Construction Company between 2011 and 2014.

The road effectively connects the town of Mbarara to the town of Kikagati and to Murongo across the Kagera River in Tanzania. In addition to the straight road, there is a 7 kilometres (4 mi) loop around Isingiro and Mabona.

== See also ==
- List of roads in Uganda
