= Abim, Uganda =

Ugandan town

Abim
- Map of Uganda showing the location of Abim
- Coordinates: 02°42′07″N 33°39′36″E
- Country: Uganda
- Region: Northern Uganda
- Sub-region: Karamoja sub-region
- District: Abim District
- Elevation: 1,154 m (3,786 ft)

Population (2020 Estimate)
  - Total: 24,400
- Time zone: UTC+3 (EAT)

Abim is a town in the Northern Region of Uganda. It is the chief municipal, administrative, and commercial center of Abim District. The district is named after the town.

== Location ==
Abim is located in Abim District, Karamoja sub-region, Northern Region, Uganda. It is located approximately 140 kilometres (87 mi), by road, west of the city of Moroto, the largest urban centre the Karamoja sub-region. This location lies approximately 180 kilometres (112 mi), by road, east of Gulu, the largest city in the Northern Region of Uganda. Abim is located approximately 414 kilometres (257 mi) northeast of Kampala, Uganda's capital and largest city. The geographical coordinates of the town are:2°42'07.2"N 33°39'36.0"E (Latitude:2.7020; Longitude:33.6600).

== Population ==
The 2002 national census enumerated the population of the town at 7,645. In 2014, the national population census and household survey enumerated 17,168 people. In 2015, the Uganda Bureau of Statistics (UBOS) estimated the town's mid-year population at about 18,100. In 2020, UBOS estimated the population of Abim Town Council at 24,400. UBOS calculated that the population of Abim, Uganda increased at an average annual rate of 6.2 percent, between 2015 and 2020.

== Points of interest ==
The following points of interest lie within the town limits or close to the edges of town: (a) the offices of Abim Town Council (b) the headquarters of Abim District Administration (c) Abim Central Market, the source of daily fresh produce (d) Abim General Hospital, a 100-bed public hospital administered by the Uganda Ministry of Health (e) a branch of DFCU Bank (f) a branch of Stanbic Bank Uganda and (g) Soroti–Amuria–Abim–Kotido Road, which passes through town in a general south to north direction.

== See also ==
- Abim District
- Karamoja
- Karimojong
- Uganda Hospitals
- List of cities and towns in Uganda
