= Nyakahita =

- Map of Uganda showing the location of Nyakahita.
- Coordinates: 00°24′48″S 31°06′46″E
- Country: Uganda
- Region: Western Region of Uganda
- Sub-region: Ankole sub-region
- District: Kiruhura District
- County: Nyabushozi County
- Constituency: Nyabushozi County

Government
  - MP: Fred Mwesigye
- Elevation: 1,400 m (4,600 ft)
- Time zone: UTC+3 (EAT)

Nyakahita is a sparsely populated settlement in the Western Region of Uganda.

== Location ==
The settlement is approximately 59 kilometres (37 mi), by road, east of Mbarara, the largest city in the Ankole sub-region along the Mbarara–Masaka highway. It is about 216 kilometres (134 mi), by road, southwest of Kampala, the capital and largest city of Uganda. The coordinates of Nyakahita are:0°24'48.0"S 31°06'46.0"E (Latitude:-0.413333; Longitude:31.112778).

== Points of interest ==
The Nyakahita–Kazo–Kamwenge–Fort Portal Road makes a T-junction with the
Mbarara-Masaka highway at Nyakahita. The town of Lyantonde in Lyantonde District, whose population was 13,586 people in 2014, lies to the immediate east of Nyakahita on this highway.

== See also ==
- List of roads in Uganda
- List of cities and towns in Uganda
