= ABIM =

ABIM may refer to:

- American Baptist International Ministries, an international Protestant Christian missionary society
- American Board of Internal Medicine, a non-profit, independent physician evaluation organization
- Angkatan Belia Islam Malaysia, an Islamic organisation founded by Muslim students
- Annual Biocontrol Industry Meeting, an annual conference of manufacturers of biological plant protection products

== See also ==
- Abim (disambiguation)
