= Kidepo International Airport =

Airport under construction in Uganda

- IATA: n/a; ICAO: n/a

Summary
- Airport type: Private, Civilian
- Owner/Operator: Sharjah Chamber of Commerce and Industry
- Serves: Kidepo, Uganda
- Coordinates: 03°44′18″N 33°44′33″E

Map
- Location of airport in Uganda

Runways
Direction	Length		Surface
Direction	m	ft	Surface
	3,600	11,811	Asphalt

Kidepo International Airport (IATA: n/a, ICAO: n/a) is an airport under development in Uganda. When completed, it will be the third international airport in the country, the other two being Entebbe International Airport and Kabalega International Airport.

== Location ==
The airport would be located outside Kidepo National Park, in Kaabong District, in the Karamoja sub-region, in the northeastern corner of the Northern Region of Uganda, close to the international borders with Kenya and with South Sudan. This is approximately 440 kilometres (273 mi), by air, northeast of Entebbe International Airport, the country's largest civilian and military airport.

== Overview ==
Entebbe International Airport is the largest international airport in Uganda. Kidepo International Airport when completed, is expected to be the second largest international airport in the country. Its development is informed by the desire by the government of Uganda to open up the country to international tourists. The new airport also complements the opening up of the Karamoja sub-region to industry and mining, including gold, nickel, marble, granite, limestone and other minerals. As part of the airport construction, the developers plan to construct multiple hotels and lodges inside the adjacent Kidepo National Park to accommodate international tourists.

== Developers ==
The developers are the Sharjah Chamber of Commerce and Industry, based in the city of Sharjah in the United Arab Emirates and are led by the Chairperson Board of Directors, Abdulla Sultan Abdulla Al Owais. Construction was expected to start in August 2024. Construction started in June 2026 and is budgeted at US$72 million. The airport employs 1,620 Ugandans during the construction phase.

== Facilities ==
The airport is expected to be a large international airport with a main runway measuring 3,600 metres (11,811 ft) in length, capable of supporting a Boeing 777 and/or similar aircraft. The planned airport is expected to be capable of handling 2 million passengers annually. Other facilities include a 7,406 square metres (79,720 ft^{2}) passenger terminal and a 72,000 square metres (780,000 ft^{2}) cargo terminal.

== See also ==
- List of airports in Uganda
- Transportation in Uganda
- Kitgum-Kidepo Road
