= Mabamba Bay =

Wetland in Uganda

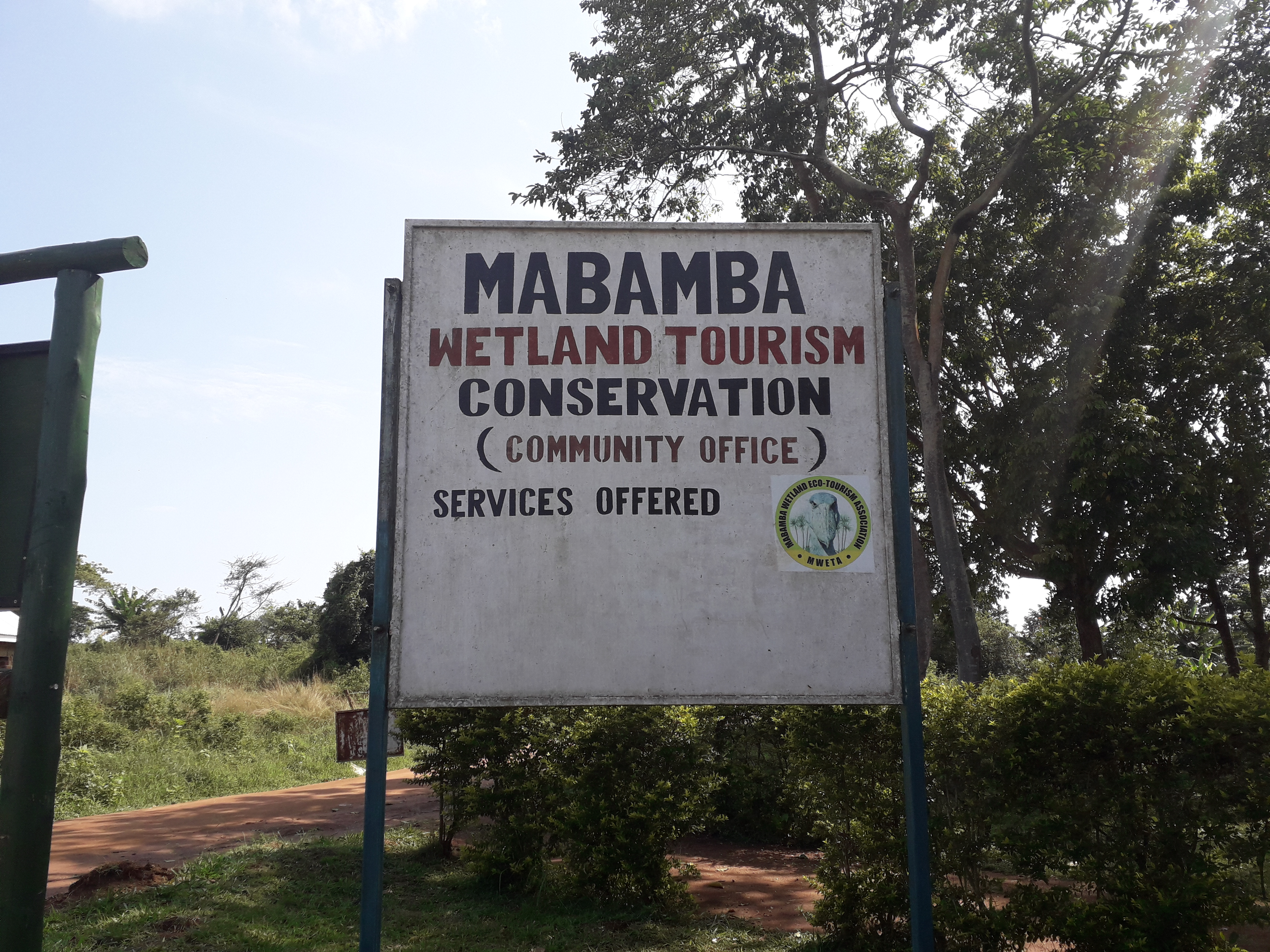

- Location within Uganda
- Coordinates: 0°5′N 32°20′E
- Basin countries: Uganda
- Surface area: 16,500 hectares (64 mi^{2})
- Surface elevation: 1,130 metres (3,710 ft)

Ramsar Wetland
- Official name: Mabamba Bay Wetland System
- Designated: 15 September 2006
- Reference no.: 1638

Mabamba Bay is a wetland on the edge of Lake Victoria, northwest of the Entebbe, on Buwaya peninsula in Kasanje Town Council. It covers an area of 2424 ha and is a home to over 300 bird species. Mabamba Swamp is famous for lungfish which is known as mamba in native language(Luganda).

== Conservation ==
Mabamba is one of Uganda's 33 Important Bird Areas and since 2006 a Ramsar-listed wetland of international importance. Key protected bird species in Mabamba are the shoebill, the blue swallow and the papyrus gonolek.

== Biodiversity ==
In addition to over 300 bird species, Mabamba Bay provides habitat for fish such as tilapia and lungfish, reptiles like monitor lizards, and small mammals. Its ecosystem services also include water purification and flood control for surrounding communities.

Although the shoebill is one of Mabamba's best-known attractions, the area is also home to a wide variety of bird species. More than 300 species have been recorded there, including the African pygmy goose, papyrus gonolek, malachite kingfisher, blue-breasted bee-eater, and swamp flycatcher.

== Awards ==
Mabamba swamp was internationally recognized by the Ramsar Convention on Wetlands the status of a ‘Wetland of International Importance’ since it contains globally threatened species in 2006.

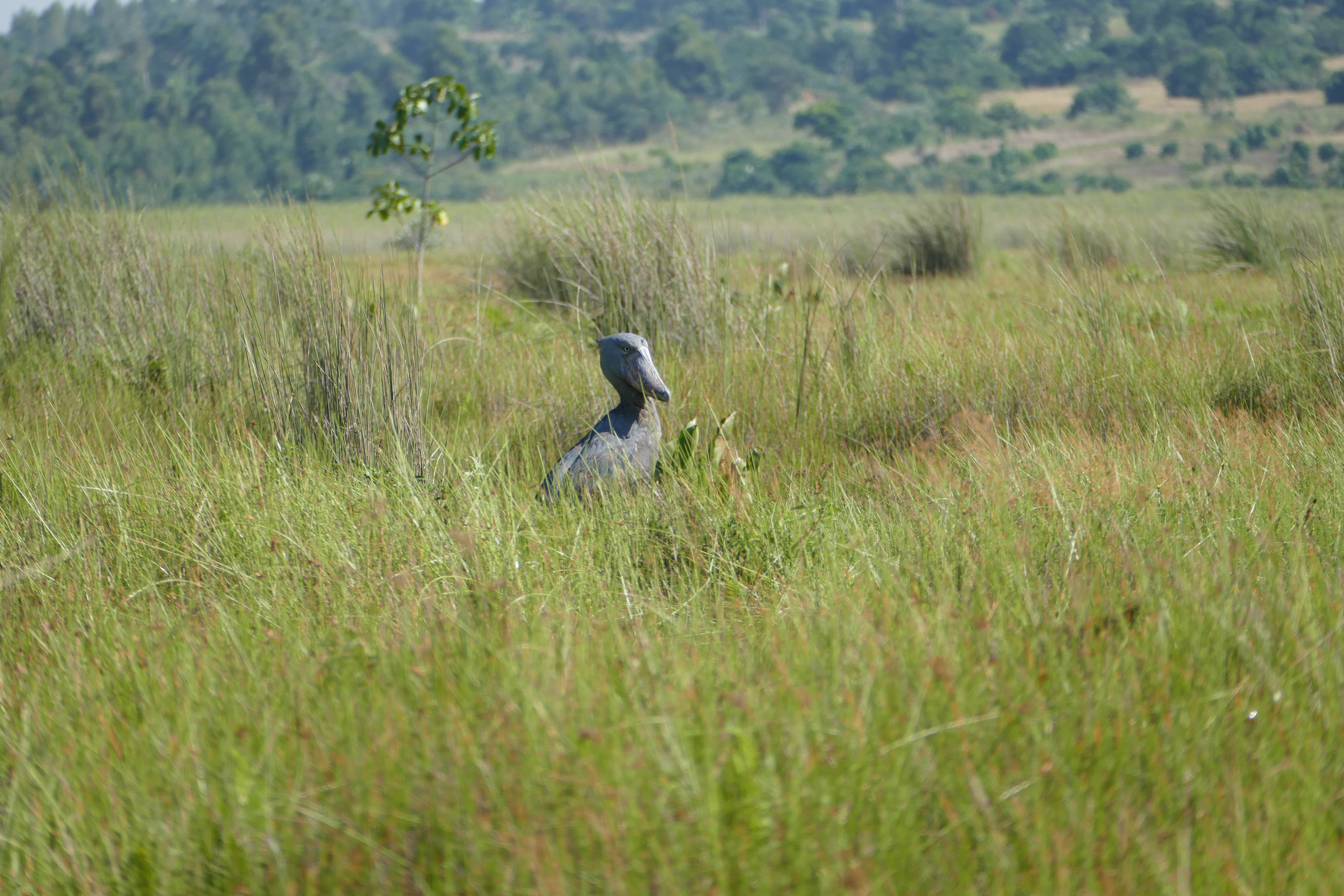
Uganda's Iconic Shoebill Stork in Mabamba Wetland

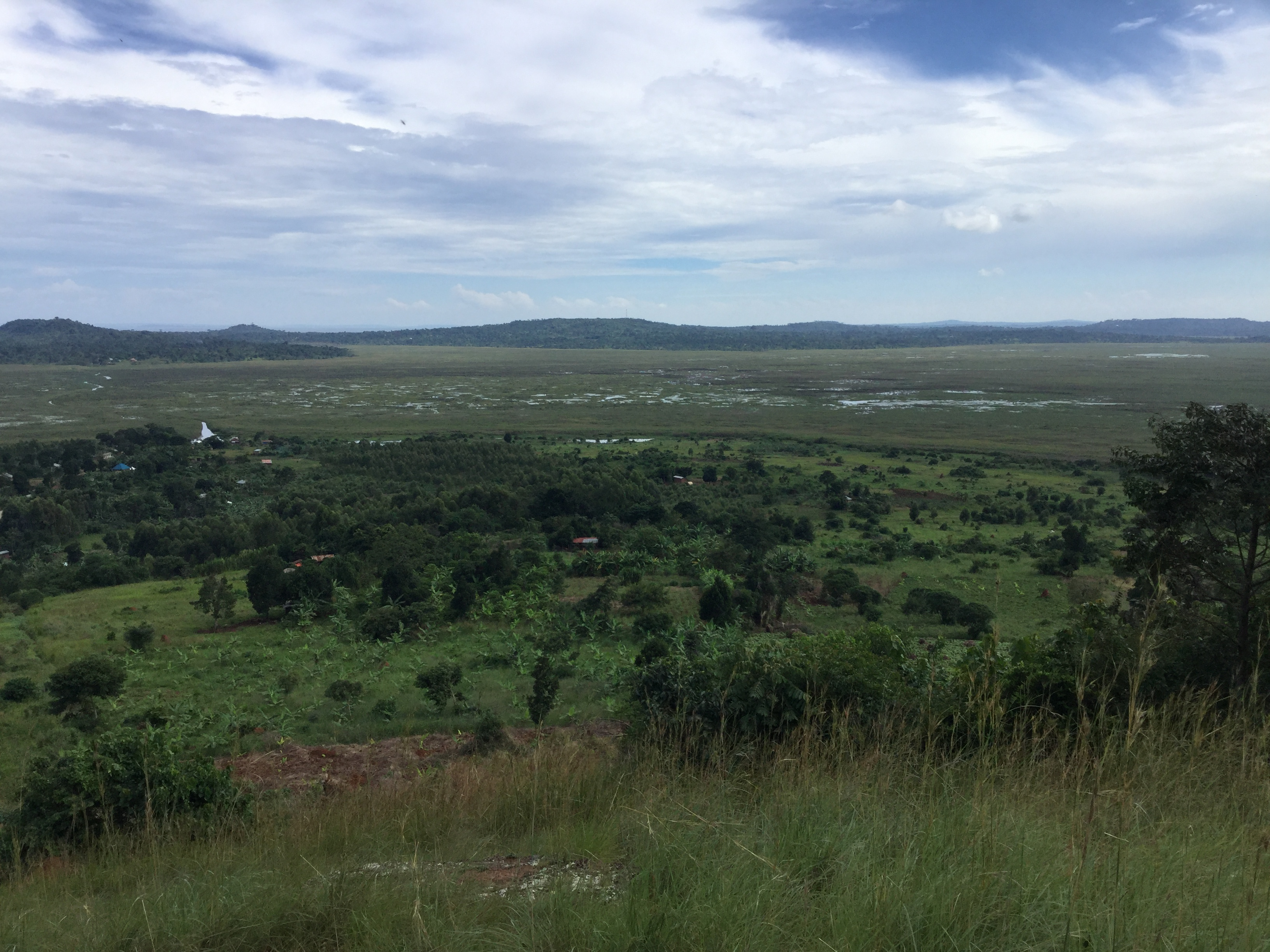
Wetlands after heavy rain

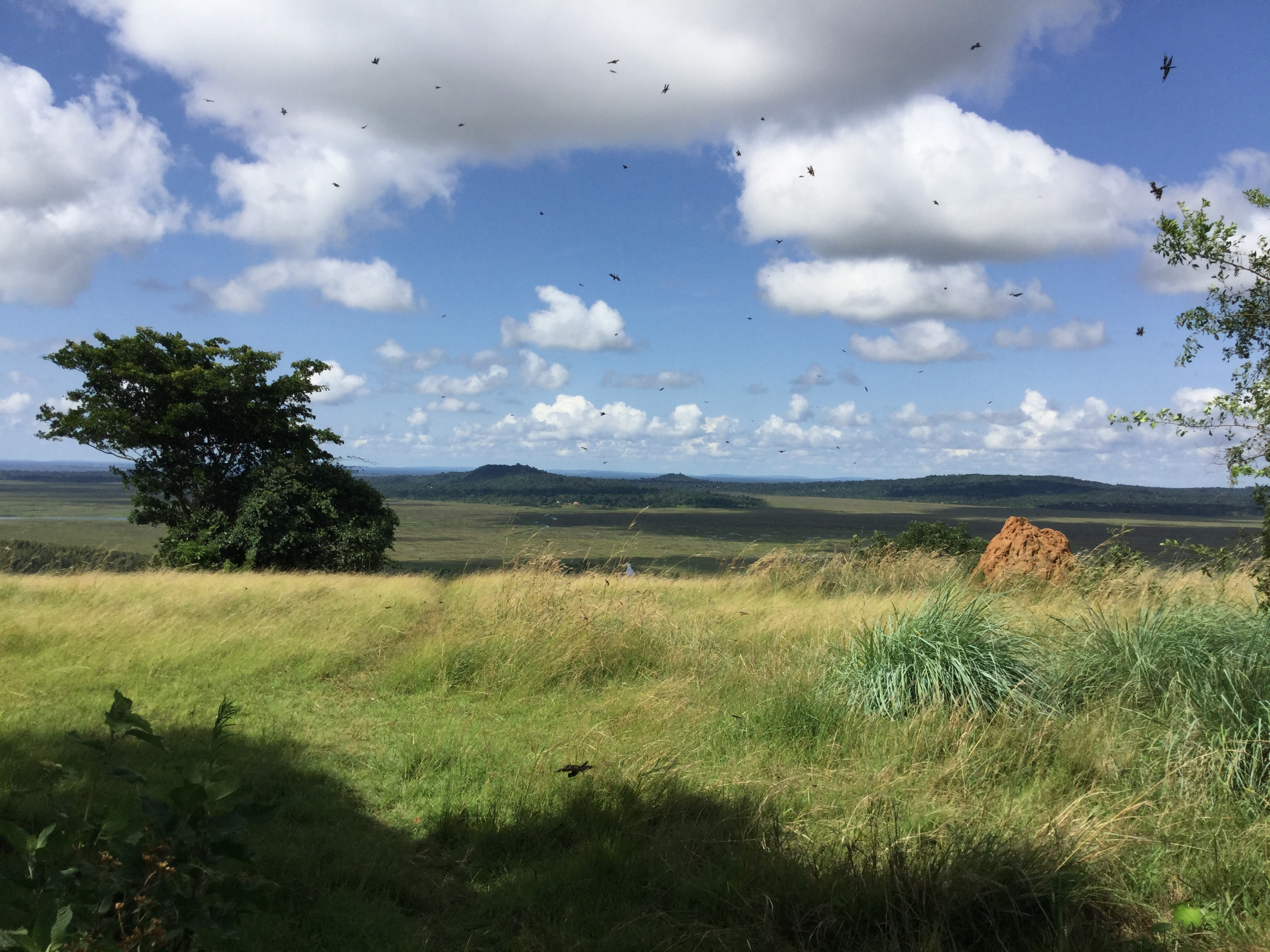
View of Mabamba bay from nearby hill
