= Buwaya =

- Map of Uganda showing the location of Buwaya
- Coordinates: 00°06′33″N 32°25′04″E
- Country: Uganda
- Region: Central Region
- District: Wakiso District
- Town Council: Kasanje
- Elevation: 1,300 m (4,300 ft)
- Time zone: UTC+3 (EAT)

Buwaya is a settlement in Kasanje Town Council, Wakiso District, in the Central Region of Uganda. It is situated on shores of Lake Victoria, west of Entebbe, and forms part of the Busiro County.

Buwaya neighbourhood is including villages of Ssazi, Lulongo, Gayaza-Nangombe Namugala-Kikaya and Ziba.

== Location ==
Buwaya is located approximately 4 kilometres across Lake Victoria from Nakiwogo landing site in Entebbe. The settlement is connected to Entebbe by water transport and to other parts of Wakiso District by road. It is accessible through the Kasanje–Buwaya road and the Nakiwogo–Buwaya ferry route. Govermant of Uganda is planning to replace ferry connection with construction of modern bridge.

== Overview ==
The local economy includes agriculture, retail trade and fishing-related activities. Some residents transport agricultural produce to markets in Entebbe using ferry services and private boats. The settlement's proximity to Lake Victoria also provides opportunities for tourism and other lake-related economic activities.

Buwaya serves as an important transport and access point for visitors travelling from Entebbe to Mabamba Bay Wetland, a renowned birdwatching destination famous for the endangered shoebill stork and other wetland bird species.

Neighbourhood hosts several resorts including: Sundiata Resort, Tilapia Lodge, Wild Geese Lodge, Nkima Forest Lodge, Mabamba Lodge among others.

== Points of interest ==
The following points of interest are within the town limits or close to the edges of neighbourhood:

- Buwaya landing site
- Free Zone Industrial Park
- St. Anthony Catholic Church Buwaya Parish, a religious centre administered by the Franciscan order of Greyfriars
- Hands of Mercy Buwaya, a community-driven initiative dedicated to improving healthcare in rural areas.
- Kasanje Bike Park
