= Kigumba–Masindi–Hoima–Kabwoya Road =

Road in Uganda

Coordinates: 01°40′20″N 31°42′19″E

Route information
- Length: 84 mi (135 km)
- History: Designation in 2014; Completion in 2021

Major junctions
- North end: Kigumba
- Masindi; Hoima
- South end: Kabwoya

Location
- Country: Uganda

Highway system
- Roads in Uganda

Kigumba–Masindi–Hoima–Kabwoya Road is a road in the Western Region of Uganda, connecting the towns of Kigumba in Kiryandongo District, Masindi in Masindi District, Hoima in Hoima District and Kabwoya, in Kikuube District.

== Location ==
The road starts at Kigumba, on the Kampala–Gulu Highway, about 42 kilometres (26 mi) northeast of Masindi (2014 population 94,622). the nearest large town. The road continues in a southwesterly direction through Hoima to end at Kabwoya, a distance of about 135 kilometres (84 mi).

== Upgrading to bitumen ==
Before 2013, the road was unsealed gravel surface. That year, the Uganda National Roads Authority (UNRA) initiated the procurement process for road works to upgrade the road to class II bitumen surface. The road was divided into two sections: the Kigumba–Bulima section 69 kilometres (43 mi) and the Bulima–Kabwoya section 69 kilometres (43 mi). The upgrade, budgeted at US$150 million, is funded by the African Development Bank and the government of Uganda.

The upgrade was initially planned to start in 2014, but there were disagreements during the tendering and procurement process. As of July 2014, the road works are yet to begin.

In September 2021, Allen Kagina, the executive director of Uganda National Road Authority, reported that the upgrade of this road to class II bitumen surface had been completed during the 2020/2021 financial year that ended on 30 June 2021.

In January 2022, Yoweri Museveni, the President of Uganda commissioned the completed road, in the presence of Robinah Nabbanja, the prime minister of Uganda and Allen Kagina, the Executive Director of Uganda National Roads Authority (UNRA).

== See also ==
- List of roads in Uganda
- Hoima
- Economy of Uganda
- Transport in Uganda
