= Kabwoya =

- Location in Uganda
- Coordinates: 01°14′43″N 31°04′59″E
- Country: Uganda
- Region: Western Region of Uganda
- District: Kikuube District
- Elevation: 3,900 ft (1,200 m)
- Climate: Aw

Kabwoya is a village in the Kikuube District of the Western Region of Uganda.

== Location ==
Kabwoya is approximately 45.5 kilometres (28.3 mi), by road, south-west of Hoima, the nearest large city. Kabwoya is also approximately 47 kilometres (29 mi), by road, north-east of Kagadi in neighboring Kagadi District, on the Kyenjojo–Kabwoya Road. The coordinates of Kabwoya are 1°14'43.0"N, 31°04'59.0"E (Latitude:1.245278; Longitude:31.083056).

== Overview ==
The 135 kilometres (84 mi) Kigumba–Masindi–Hoima–Kabwoya Road joins the 103 kilometres (64 mi) Kyenjojo–Kabwoya Road in the middle of Kabwoya.

== See also ==
- List of roads in Uganda
- List of cities and towns in Uganda
