= Kyenjojo–Kabwoya Road =

Road in Uganda

Coordinates: 00°56′19″N 30°48′32″E

Route information
- Length: 64 mi (103 km)
- History: Designation in 2016; Completion in 2021

Major junctions
- South end: Kyenjojo
- Kagadi
- North end: Kabwoya

Location
- Country: Uganda

Highway system
- Roads in Uganda

The Kyenjojo–Kabwoya Road, in the Western Region of Uganda, connects the town of Kyenjojo in the Kyenjojo District with Kabwoya in the Hoima District. The road is part of the 238 kilometres (148 mi) Kyenjojo–Hoima–Masindi–Kigumba road corridor.

== Location ==
The road starts at Kyenjojo, 51 kilometres (32 mi) east of Fort Portal on the Mubende–Kyegegwa–Kyenjojo–Fort Portal Road, and continues north through Kagadi in Kagadi District, to end in Kabwoya in Hoima District, a distance of approximately 103 kilometres (64 mi). The road connects traffic from Rwanda, Burundi, and south-western Uganda that is destined for the Albertine graben, directly with the Ugandan oil capital of Hoima and with a link to South Sudan via the Kigumba–Masindi–Hoima–Kabwoya Road.

== Upgrading to bitumen ==
The government of Uganda has earmarked this road for upgrading through the conversion of the existing gravel road to bitumen surface and the building of bridges, shoulders, and drainage channels. Application has been made for a loan from the World Bank to fund the upgrade. In August 2015, the World Bank committed to lend US$145 million (about UGX:526 billion) to the Uganda government to pave this road and improve the access of the local population to education and other social economic services. A Chinese company has been awarded the contract, at a budgeted cost of UGX:214 billion and with commissioning expected in 2019.

== Construction ==
The civil works contract was awarded to Sinopec Petroleum Engineering Corporation (formerly Shengli Engineering Construction (Group) Company Limited), at a contract price of USh:214.564 billion (approx. US$60 million). The supervising engineering contract was awarded to Comptran Engineering & Planning Associates of Ghana, at a price of US$3,079,482. Construction began on 5 April 2016 and was expected to last 36 months. The project was co-funded by the International Development Association and the Government of Uganda.

In September 2021, Allen Kagina, the executive director of Uganda National Road Authority, announced that the upgrade of this road to class II bitumen surface had been completed during the 2020/2021 financial year that ended on 30 June 2021.

== See also ==
- Uganda Oil Refinery
- Economy of Uganda
- Transport in Uganda
- Uganda–Kenya Crude Oil Pipeline
- List of roads in Uganda
- List of cities and towns in Uganda
