= Katende Joram =

Ugandan footballer (born 1987)

Kate Raymond
Personal information
- Full name: Katende Jerome Raymond
- Date of birth: 29 September 1987 (age 39)
- Place of birth: Kampala, Uganda
- Height: 1.75 m (5 ft 9 in)
- Positions: Winger; striker

Senior career*
Years	Team	Apps	(Gls)
2003–2005	SC Villa	45	(22)
2006–2007	Police FC	27	(18)
2007–2008	URA FC	25	(15)
2009–2010	Al Nasr	20	(14)
April 2012– Nov 2012	USM	10	(3)

International career^{‡}
2005	Uganda U20	10	(0)
2008–2009	Uganda U23	20	(15)
2010–	Uganda	10	(3)
- * Club domestic league appearances and goals as of 25 November 2013 ‡ National team caps and goals as of 25 November 2013

Katende (Kate) Jerome Raymond, also Katende Joram (born 29 September 1987) is a Ugandan professional footballer who formerly plays for Malaysian Premier League side Universiti Sains Malaysia in Malaysia. Although he primarily plays as a left winger, he can also operate as a striker, speed being his main attribute.

He started his playing career with Ugandan side SC Villa in 2003, having graduated from high school, and he made 45 appearances for the side, before switching to other Ugandan side Police in 2006. After making 27 appearances with Police scoring 18 goals, Ugandan side Uganda Revenue Authority SC enticed him and joined them in 2007. During his 2 years with U.R.A he made 25 appearances for the club, before moving to Oman's Premier League side Al Nasrin 2009. After a successful year in Oman, he joined Malaysian Premier League side Universiti Sains Malaysia Staff F.C. where he currently plays.
