= Bugoma Forest =

Forest in Uganda

- Bugoma Central Forest Reserve
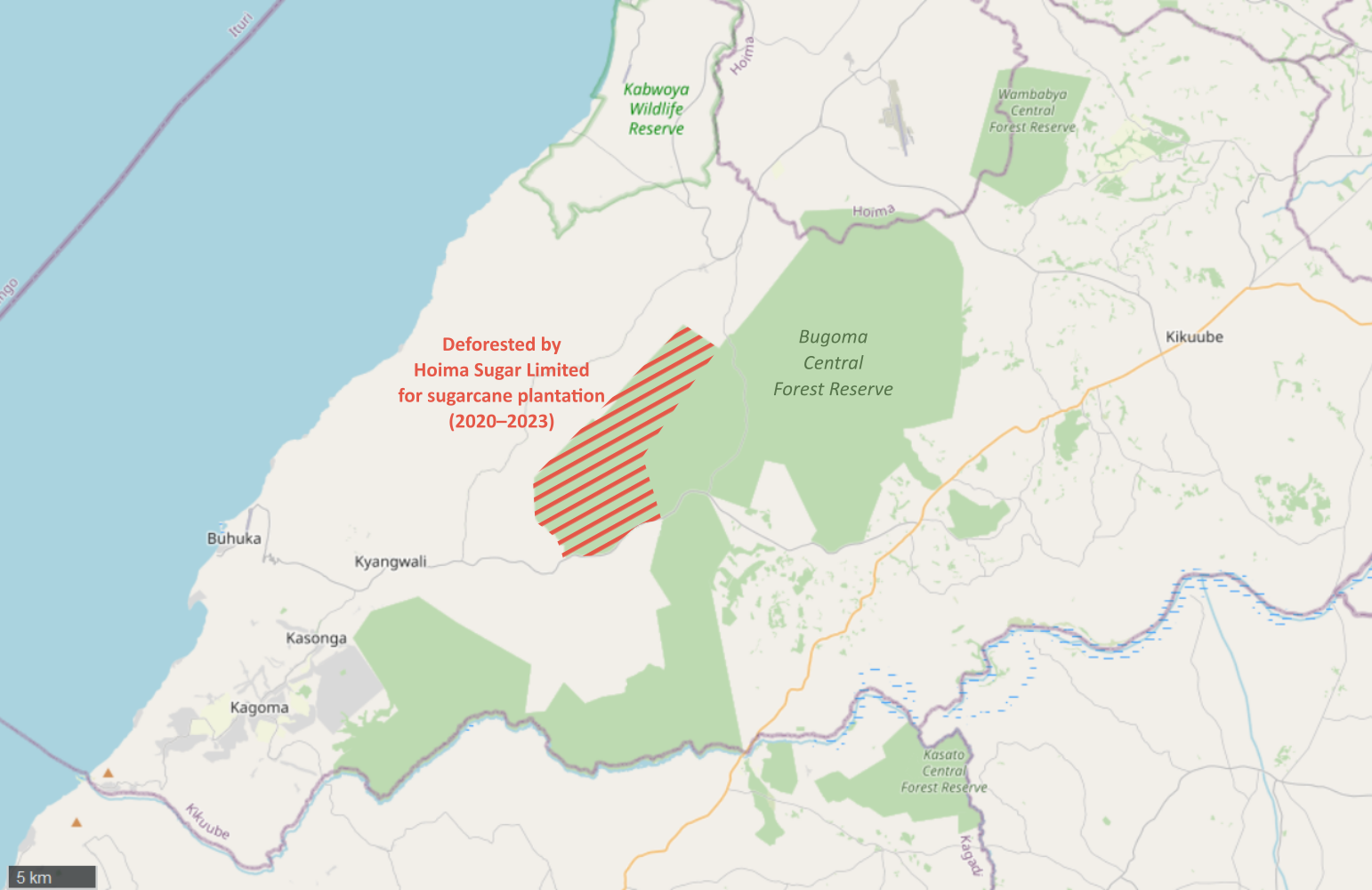
- Map of Bugoma Forest, showing the area deforested by Hoima Sugar Limited for sugarcane plantation (2020–2023).

- Location within Uganda
- Location: Hoima, Western Region, Uganda
- Coordinates: 01°15′20″N 30°58′00″E
- Area: 400 km^{2} (150 sq mi)

The Bugoma Forest is a protected tropical forest that is situated southwest of Hoima and northeast of Kyenjojo towns, and east of Lake Albert, in the Hoima district of western Uganda. It was gazetted in the 1932 and came under the mandate of the National Forestry Authority in 2003. But it was expanded in 1965, 1968 and 1998. Its surface area is given as between 41,144 hectares (411.44 km^{2}) and 65,000 hectares (650 km^{2}).

== Setting and structure ==
It is one of a belt of extensive, lowland forests along Uganda's western rift escarpment, that are believed to have been connected with one another and the Ituri forest in former times. The forest belt is situated between 500 and 1,650 metres a.s.l., and Bugoma is situated at between 990 and 1,300 m elevation. Regional rainfall ranges from 1 250 to 1,625 mm. Farmlands and regenerating vegetation fringe the forests, which includes Elephant grass and Hyparrhenia grassland.

The tree cover of the forest belt shows a tendency toward monospecific dominance. Early colonising forest consists of a mixed forest with Alstonia congensis, Trichilia prieuriana, Khaya anthotheca, Celtis mildbraedii, and Cynometra alexandri (Uganda ironwood), among others. The climax forest that develops afterward depends on the altitude. From 1 000 to 1 200 m Cynometra alexandri is highly dominant. Lasiodiscus mildbraedii and sometimes by Celtis spp. and Strychnos mitis sometimes dominate the understorey. Very large trees other than Cynometra alexandri occur, such as Khaya spp. and Entandrophragma spp. Patches of characteristic colonising species (e.g. Maesopsis spp.) mature alongside climax canopy species in a mosaic pattern in spaces left by the fall of large trees. Another type of climax community is the Parinari forest, consisting of almost pure stands of Parinari excelsa, associated in the understorey with Carapa grandiflora. Other understorey species are Craterispermum laurinum, Trichilia prieuriana and Pleiocarpa pycnantha.

The name Bugoma means "small drum". The Omukama Kabalega used to train Abarusura (the royal army of Bunyoro) in the trees in the Budongo's royal mile that he planted himself.

Some of the trees species such as mwitansowera, loosely translated as "killer of house insects (flies)", are believed to have supernatural powers and they are never logged or touched by anyone including the illegal loggers and makers of charcoal as they are believed to shock anyone who touches it including insects. The banyoro get there totems which are either animals or plants forests such as Bugoma.

== Wildlife ==
23 species of mammal, 225 species of birds (which include Nahan's partridge, grey parrot and African crowned eagle), butterfly species (such as Anthene ituria) and 260 plant species (such as Afrothismia winkleri, Brazzia longipedicellata and Dialium excelsum), 20 species of forest amphibians are known to occur in the reserve. The forest is home to a considerable number of chimpanzees which have started to undergo the habituation process in January 2016.

== Conservation status ==
The forest is threatened by illegal logging, charcoal burning, hunting, mining and it is feared that it may succumb to settlement and agriculture. The situation is worsened by an influx of Congolese refugees, and burgeoning large-scale tea, sugarcane, rice and tobacco farms on its outskirts that infringe on the reserve boundaries.

In March 2012 some 1,500 land invaders were evicted, but by December 2013 some of them were returning to start subsistence cultivation and pit sawing.

In August 2020, Nema issued a certificate to Hoima Sugar Company to turn 22 sq miles of the forest into sugarcane plantation, an urban trading and settlement centre among others. This land area is extremely big with a variety of trees and grass species and other forms of nature/creation.

National Forestry Authority has regularly supplied tree seedlings to environmentalists to plant them.

Kabalega Hydro Electric power dam was constructed on River Wambabya that produces 9 mega watts in Buseruka Subcounty. But the turbines of the power dam are being ruined by the silting of the river due to reduction of the Bugoma forest.

In 2021, the UNCHR partnered with NFA to replant trees and managed to restore 50 hectares of Bugoma forest cover.

== Controversies ==
The construction of the 897-mile (1,443 kilometer) East African Crude Oil Pipeline (EACOP) faced resistance by climate activists and environmentalists that is supposed to originate from the oil fields of Hoima passing through Wambabya, Bugoma and Taala Central Forest Reserves and in Uganda to Tanga in Tanzania. This caused international banks such as HSBC, BNP Paribas and insurers such as insurer Allianz Group to not back the pipeline financially. But The China National Offshore Oil Corporation (CNOOC), TotalEnergies, the Uganda National Oil Company and the Tanzania Petroleum Development Cooperation are still working on pipeline until it start transporting the crude oil in 2025. Over 14,000 households will be displaced in both Uganda and Tanzania.

== See also ==
- Central Forest Reserves of Uganda
- Mabira Forest
- Budongo Forest
- National Forestry Authority
