= Mull Katende =

Ugandan diplomat (born 1957)

His Excellency Mull Sebujja Katende
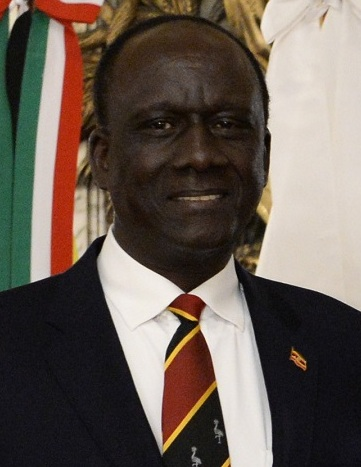
- Katende in 2019
- Born: Mull Katende; February 26, 1957 (age 69); Rugaaga, Isingiro District, Uganda
- Education: Makerere University (Bachelor of Arts in Economics); University of Oxford (Master of Arts in Developmental Economics)
- Occupation: Diplomat
- Years active: 1994 — present
- Known for: Diplomacy
- Title: Uganda's Ambassador to the United States of America
- Spouse: Maliamu Nalumanssi (m. 1990)

Mull Sebujja Katende is a Ugandan diplomat, who serves as Uganda's Ambassador to the United States of America, based in Washington, DC. He was appointed to that position on 27 January 2017, and he took up the position in September 2017.

In that capacity, he also represents his country, to the nations of United States, Argentina, Bolivia, Brazil, Chile, Colombia, Ecuador, Jamaica, Mexico, Paraguay, Peru, Trinidad and Tobago, Uruguay and Venezuela.

He previously served, for a period of nearly ten years (2008–2017), as the Ambassador of Uganda to Ethiopia and Djibouti, based in Addis Ababa, with concurrent accreditation as Permanent Representative to the African Union, the United Nations Economic Commission for Africa and the Inter-Governmental Authority on Development. Before that, from 2003 until 2008, he was Uganda's Ambassador to Sudan.

== Background and education ==
He was born in Rugaaga, in present-day Isingiro District, on 26 February 1957. He attended Kyarubambura Primary School, in Rugaaga. He studied at Kings College Budo, for his secondary education, obtaining his High School Diploma in 1975. He was admitted to Makerere University, Uganda's oldest and largest public university, graduating in 1979, with a degree of Bachelor of Arts in Economics. Later, he studied at the University of Oxford, where he obtained a Master of Arts degree in Developmental economics.

== Career ==
Mull Katende is a career diplomat. Before he was appointed ambassador in 2003, he served as a foreign service officer with the Ugandan Ministry of Foreign Affairs, based in Kampala. He is a member of the Ugandan diplomatic team that negotiated the reinstatement of the East African Community in November 1999.

He served as Uganda's ambassador to Sudan from 2003 until 2008. He then served for nine years, as Uganda's ambassador based in Addis Ababa, with accreditation to Ethiopia, Djibouti, the African Union, UNECA and IGAD, an eight-country trade bloc comprising Djibouti, Eritrea, Ethiopia, Kenya, Somalia, South Sudan, Sudan, and Uganda.

He was appointed Uganda's ambassador to the United States, on 27 January 2017 and he presented his credentials on 9 September 2017.

== Family ==
Ambassador Katende is married to Maliam Nalumansi Katende and they are parents to two daughters and two sons.
