= Nyakahita–Kazo–Kamwenge–Fort Portal Road =

Road in Uganda

Coordinates: 00°22′27″S 31°16′17″E

Route information
- Length: 129 mi (208 km)
- History: Designation in 2011; Completion in 2017

Major junctions
- South end: Nyakahita
- Kazo; Ibanda; Kamwenge
- North end: Fort Portal

Location
- Country: Uganda

Highway system
- Roads in Uganda

The Nyakahita–Kazo–Kamwenge–Fort Portal Road is a road in the Western Region of Uganda, connecting the towns of Nyakahita and Kazo in Kiruhura District, Ibanda in Ibanda District, Kamwenge in Kamwenge District, and Fort Portal in Kabarole District.

== Location ==
The road starts at Nyakahita, on the Masaka–Mbarara Road, about 67 kilometres (42 mi) east of Mbarara, the largest city in the Ankole sub-region. The road continues through four western Ugandan districts to end at Fort Portal, a total of about 208 kilometres (129 mi). The coordinates of the road near Kamwenge are 0°11'09.0"N, 30°27'14.0"E (Latitude:0.185833; Longitude:30.453889).

== Upgrading to bitumen ==
Before 2011, the entire road was poor grade gravel surface. In that year, the upgrading of the road to bitumen was divided into three sections: Nyakahita–Kazo 68 kilometres (42 mi), Kazo–Kamwenge 75 kilometres (47 mi), and Kamwenge–Fort Portal 66 kilometres (41 mi).

The Nyakahita–Kazo section was contracted to the China Communications Construction Company for USh:134 billion. The consulting engineers on the project were J. Burrow. This section was completed in June 2013. The Kazo–Kamwenge section was contracted to the China Railway Seventh Group for USh:167 billion. The Canadian engineering firm SNC Lavalin performed the consulting and supervision. Construction on these two sections began in May 2011. Funding was sourced from the African Development Bank and the Ugandan government. Work on the Kazo–Kamwenge Road ended in June 2014.

Work to upgrade the 66 kilometres (41 mi) Kamwenge–Fort Portal section was assigned to the China Railway Seventh Group. The USh:120 billion cost is funded jointly by the government of Uganda and the International Development Association. Work began in February 2015, and is expected to end in July 2016. In August 2017, the Daily Monitor, a Ugandan English language daily, reported that this section of the road had been completed.

== See also ==
- List of roads in Uganda
- Economy of Uganda
- Transport in Uganda
