= Hoima Sugar Limited =

Sugar manufacturer in Uganda

Coordinates: 00°55′13″N 30°24′41″E

- Company type: Private
- Industry: Manufacture & Marketing of Sugar
- Founded: 2016
- Headquarters: Kiswaza, Hoima District, Uganda
- Key people: Sarbhjit Singh Rajima; Executive Director
- Products: Sugar
- Number of employees: 5,000+ (2016)

Hoima Sugar Limited (HSL), also Hoima Sugar is a sugar manufacturer in Uganda, the third-largest economy in the East African Community and responsible for massive deforestation.

== Location ==
The company headquarters and factory are located on an 8,000 acres (32 km^{2}) estate in Kiswaza Village, Kiziranfumbi sub-county, Hoima District, approximately 39 kilometres (24 mi) southwest of Hoima, the nearest large city and location of the district headquarters. The sugar plantation was partially established on a large section of the Bugoma Forest, a critical habitat for the Uganda mangabey and home to an estimated 550 chimpanzees. The coordinates of the factory are 1°15'09.0"N, 31°11'36.0"E (Latitude:1.252490; Longitude:31.193326).

== Social and environmental concerns ==
=== Forced evictions ===
In 2013, Hoima Sugar Limited forcibly evicted approximately 6,000 individuals from 1,300 acres in Kijayo, Buhaguzi County, Kikuube District, to establish a sugar plantation. These evictions displaced indigenous communities, including the Bakiga, Banyoro, and some Alur people, leaving them without compensation and forcing them into internally displaced persons' camps.

Despite legal actions taken by the affected individuals seeking compensation for lost property and human rights violations, many continue to live in poor conditions without adequate support. As of 2019, reports indicated that some residents received as little as 30,000 Ugandan Shillings (approximately USD 8) per acre as compensation, which is insufficient for resettlement.

The evictions have led to significant humanitarian challenges, including lack of access to clean water, healthcare, and education. The displaced families reside in makeshift shelters with inadequate sanitation, contributing to health issues such as malnutrition and disease outbreaks.

In 2017, allegations emerged that local police forces were complicit in the forced evictions. Hoima District Police Commander Bernard Akankwasa was accused of deploying officers to assist Hoima Sugar Limited in expelling families from their land, despite a 2014 court order prohibiting such actions. Reports indicate that during these evictions, an infant died due to excessive use of force by the police.

These events have drawn criticism from human rights organizations, highlighting the ongoing struggles of displaced communities in Uganda due to large-scale agribusiness operations.

=== Deforestation ===
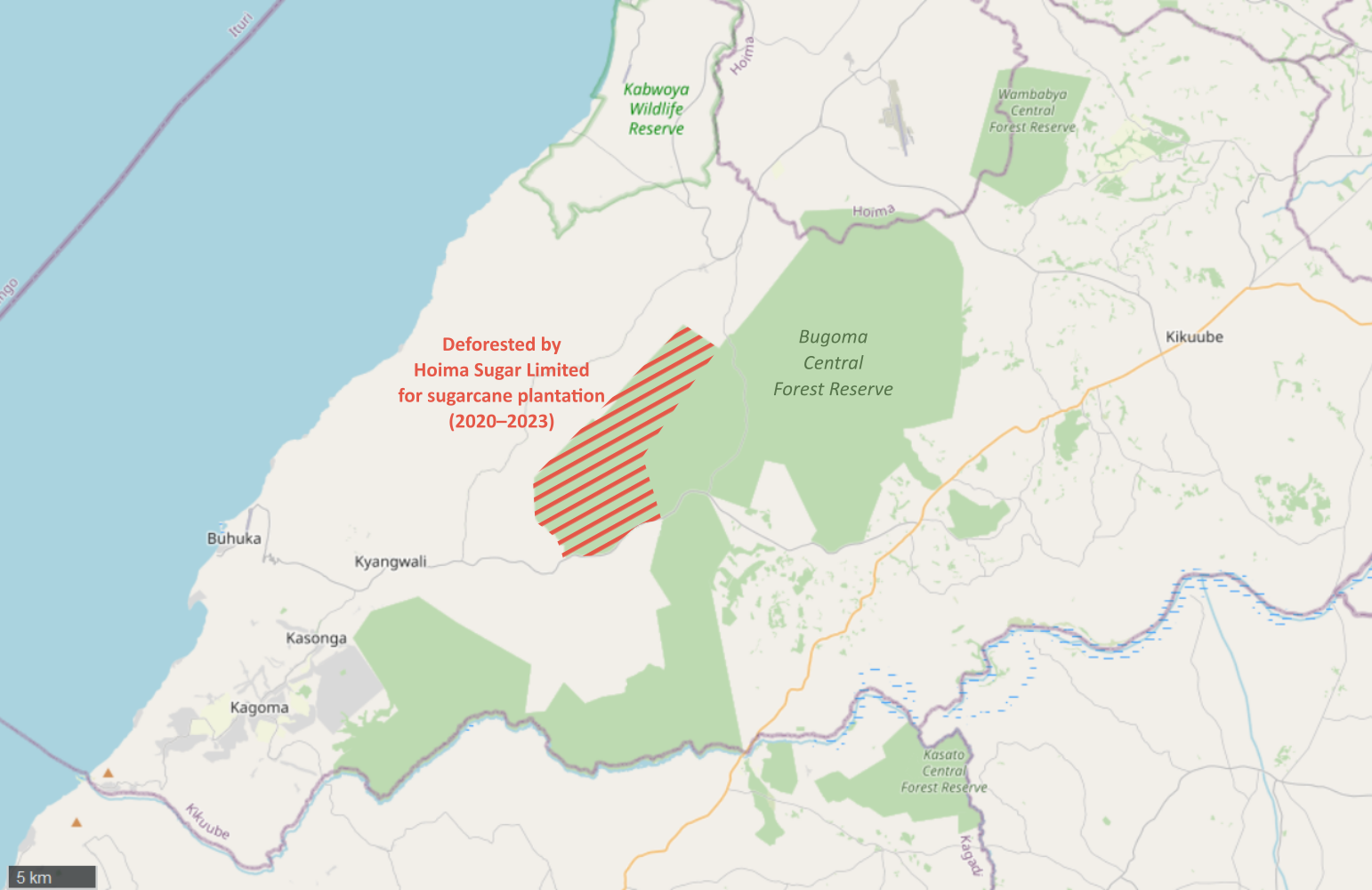
Map of Bugoma Forest, showing the area deforested by Hoima Sugar Limited for sugarcane plantation (2020–2023).

Between 2020 and 2023, approximately 57 km^{2} (14 percent of its original area) of the Bugoma Forest was degazetted by the National Environment Management Authority (NEMA) and cleared for sugarcane plantations by Hoima Sugar Limited.

In August 2020, NEMA granted an Environmental and Social Impact Assessment (ESIA) certificate to Hoima Sugar Limited for a project that included a sugarcane plantation, an eco-tourism site, and an urban center. However, subsequent inspections revealed that the company had violated the approval conditions by deforesting protected areas and sites designated for eco-tourism. In September 2022, NEMA ordered Hoima Sugar Limited to halt further deforestation in these areas and to restore the degraded sections of Bugoma Forest.

The deforestation of Bugoma Forest has had significant environmental impacts, including the loss of habitat for approximately 500 chimpanzees and other endangered species. Additionally, it has disrupted the livelihoods of local communities that rely on the forest for resources.

Environmental organizations and civil society groups have condemned NEMA's decision and Hoima Sugar Limited's activities, arguing that the destruction of Bugoma Forest for sugarcane cultivation poses serious threats to biodiversity and contributes to climate change.

== Overview ==
The company is a medium-sized sugar manufacturer, established in 2016, with production capacity of 1,500 metric tonnes daily. The factory had signed up 450 out-growers as at May 2016, with that number expected to grow to 2,000 by 2017. The total work force at the company is projected to grow to 5,000, once all systems are operational. A thermal power co-generation facility is planned. The total investment is calculated at US$42 million.

== Ownership ==
The business is owned by the Sarrai Group. The family-owned group has a 70 percent shareholding in Kinyara Sugar Works in neighboring Masindi District and also owns West Kenya Sugar Limited, and Sukari Industries both in Kenya.

== See also ==
- Hoima
- Mayuge District
- Western Uganda
- Uganda Economy
- Uganda Sugar Factories
