= Kikuube District =

Ugandan administrative district

- District
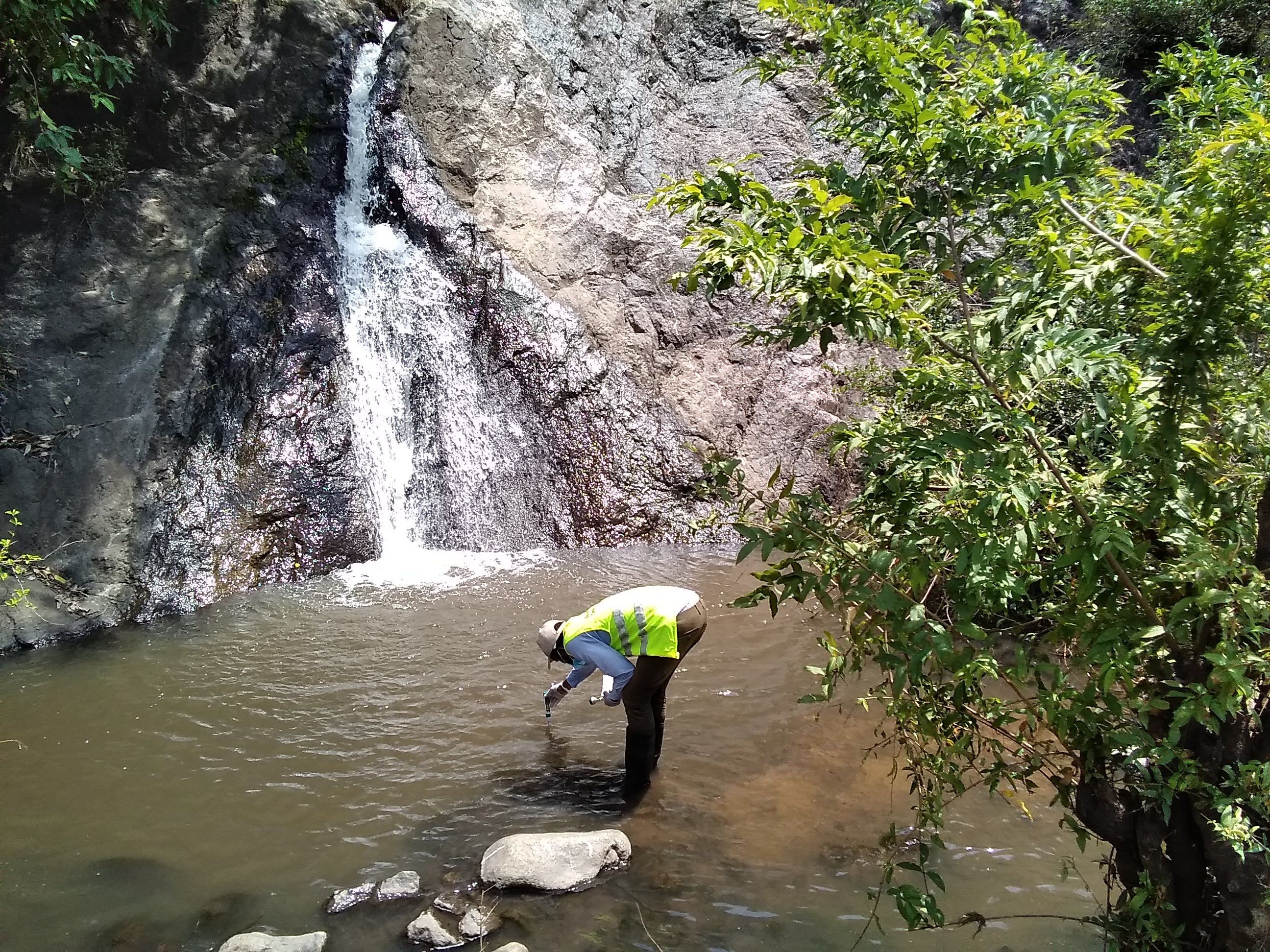
- Water sampling in Kikuube District
- Interactive map of Kikuube District
- Coordinates: 01°13′N 31°08′E
- Country: Uganda
- Region: Western Uganda
- Sub-region: Bunyoro sub-region
- Established: 1 July 2018

Area
  - Total: 2,097 km^{2} (810 sq mi)

Population (1 July 2020)
  - Total: 358,700 Estimate
  - Density: 171.1/km^{2} (443/sq mi)
- Time zone: UTC+3 (EAT)

Kikuube District is a district in the Western Region of Uganda. It is named after its main municipal centre, Kikuube.

== Location ==
Kikuube District is bordered by Hoima District to the north and east, Kakumiro District to the southeast, Kibaale District and Kagadi District to the south, Ntoroko District to the southwest and Lake Albert and the Democratic Republic of the Congo to the west. The district headquarters are located at Kikuube, about 25 kilometres (16 mi), southwest of the city of Hoima, the largest urban centre in the Bunyoro sub-region. Kikuube is located about 215 kilometres (134 mi), by road, northwest of Kampala, Uganda's capital and largest city.

Kikuube District has small Administrative units and these include the following as below.

=== Buhaguzi County ===
Kabwoya

1. Bubogo
2. Igwanjura
3. Kaseeta
4. Kimbugu
5. Nkondo

Kikuube Town Council

1. Bulimya Ward
2. Kamusunsi Ward
3. Kigorra Ward
4. Kisambo Ward

Kiziranfumbi

1. Bulimya
2. Kidoma
3. Munteme

Kyangwali

1. Buhuka
2. Butoole
3. Kasonga
4. Kyangwali

Kyangwali RSC

1. Nukanga
2. Bukinda
3. Buyanja
4. Kagoma
5. Karuhinda
6. Kasonga
7. Kavule
8. Kentomi
9. Kijubwe
10. Kilima
11. Kinakyeitaka
12. Kirokole
13. Kyebitaka
14. Malembo
15. Mombasa
16. Mukarange
17. Mukunyu B
18. Mukunyu A
19. Mulumba
20. Munsisa A
21. Munsisa B
22. Namakakale
23. Ngurwe
24. Nyabitete
25. Nyambogo
26. Nyamiganda
27. Nyampindu
28. Rwenyawawa
29. Waibuga

=== Buhaguzi Eest County ===
Bugambe

- Bugambe
- Katanga
- Nyarugabu
- Ruguse

Buhimba

- Kinogozi
- Kyabatalya
- Musaija Mukuru East
- Musaija Mukuru west
- Ruhunga

Buhimba Town Council

- Buhimba East Ward
- Buhimba West Ward
- Kigaaya East Ward
- Kigaaya West Ward

== Overview ==
Up until 30 June 2018, Kikuube District was part of Hoima District. On 1 July 2018, the southwestern portion of Hoima District was hived off to create Kikuube District. As of October 2020, Bunyoro sub-region comprises the districts of 1. Hoima 2. Buliisa 3. Masindi 4. Kiryandongo 5. Kakumiro 6. Kibaale, 7. Kagadi and 8. the district of Kikuube. The establishment of Kikuube District led to the creation of an estimated 700 new jobs.

== Population ==
The national population census and household survey held on 27 August 2014 enumerated 267,455 people in the district. In 2020, the Uganda Bureau of Statistics (UBOS), estimated the mid-year population of the district at approximately 358,700 people, with about 184,200 (51.4 percent) males and 174,500 (48.6 percent) females. The district population grew at an estimated 5.15 percent average annual rate, between 2014 and 2020. Approximately 89.5 percent of the district population is rural and 10.5 percent of the population is urban. And in the 2024 the population was estimated at 379,547.

== Economic activities ==
In 2006, the Kingfisher oil field was discovered in Kikuube District. Oil production, processing facilities will be located on the Buhuka Flats at the shores of Lake Albert with the start of the East African Crude Oil Pipeline. Kikuube district in common with Hoima District, from which it was created, has considerable undeveloped oil and natural gas deposits.

With the establishment of Hoima Sugar Limited, many smallholder farmers have taken up growling sugarcane. As of September 2020, in excess of 3,500 smallholder farmers, had signed out-grower contracts with the sugar factory and collectively had over 8,000 hectares (20,000 acres) under sugarcane cultivation.

== See also ==
- Kabwoya
- Nzizi Thermal Power Station
- Western Region, Uganda
- Parliament of Uganda
- Districts of Uganda
