= Isingiro =

Ugandan town

- Location in Uganda
- Coordinates: 00°47′42″S 30°48′55″E
- Country: Uganda
- Region: Western Region
- Sub-region: Ankole sub-region
- District: Isingiro District
- Elevation: 4,206 ft (1,282 m)

Population (2024 Census)
  - Total: 39,957

Isingiro is a town in the Western Region of Uganda. It is the main municipal, administrative, and commercial center of Isingiro District and the site of the district's headquarters.

== Location ==
Isingiro is approximately 42 kilometres (26 mi) southeast of Mbarara, the largest city in the Ankole sub-region. The town of Isingiro is surrounded by the villages of Nyakigera, Gayaza, Rwembwa, Mabona, Kibwera, and Rumira. Isingiro is located approximately 310 kilometres (193 mi), by road, southwest of Kampala, the capital and largest city of Uganda. The coordinates of Isingiro Town Council are 0°47'42.0"S, 30°48'55.0"E (Latitude:-0.795000, Longitude:30.815278).

== Population ==
The 2002 national census estimated the town's population at 17,000. In 2010, the Uganda Bureau of Statistics (UBOS) estimated the population at 21,400. In 2011, UBOS estimated the mid-year population at 22,000.

In August 2014, the national census put the population at 27,991. In 2015, UBOS estimated the population of the town at 28,800. In 2020, the population agency estimated the mid-year population at 34,300 inhabitants. Of those, 17,500 (51 percent) were females and 16,800 (49 percent) were males. UBOS calculated that the population of Isingiro Town Council expanded at an average annual rate of 3.6 percent between 2015 and 2020.

Historical population
Year	Pop.	±%
2002	19,773	—
2010	21,400	+8.2%
2011	22,000	+2.8%
2014	27,991	+27.2%
2015	28,200	+0.7%
2020	34,300	+21.6%

== Points of interest ==
The following additional points of interest lie within or close to the town: (a) the headquarters of Isingiro District administration (b) the offices of Isingiro Town Council (c) Isingiro central market, the source of daily fresh produce and (d) the 74 kilometres (46 mi) Mbarara–Kikagati Road passes through the western neighborhoods of the town in a general north to south direction.

== See also ==
- List of cities and towns in Uganda
