= Abim District =

- District
- District location in Uganda
- Coordinates: 02°44′N 33°40′E
- Country: Uganda
- Region: Northern Uganda
- Sub-region: Karamoja sub-region
- Capital: Abim

Area
  - Total: 2,353.3 km^{2} (908.6 sq mi)

Population (2012 Estimate)
  - Total: 56,500
  - Density: 24/km^{2} (62/sq mi)
- Time zone: UTC+3 (EAT)
- Website: www.abim.go.ug

Abim District is a district in Northern Uganda. It is named after its 'chief town', Abim, where the district headquarters are located.

== Location ==
Abim District is bordered by Kotido District to the north and east, Napak District to the southeast and south, Otuke District to the southwest and Agago District to the west. The district headquarters at Abim, are located approximately 140 kilometres (87 mi), by road, northwest of Moroto, the largest town in the sub-region. This location lies approximately 366 kilometres (227 mi), by road, northeast of Kampala, the capital of Uganda and the largest city in that country. The coordinates of the district are:02 44N, 33 40E.

== Overview ==
Abim District became functional on 1 July 2006. Prior to that, it was known as Labwor County in Kotido District. The district is composed of five sub-counties and one town council, Abim Town Council. Abim District covers an area of 2,353.3 square kilometres (908.6 mi^{2}). The district is part of the Karamoja sub-region, home to an estimated one million Karimojong. The sub-region consists of the following districts: 1. Abim District 2. Amudat District 3. Kaabong District 4. Kotido District 5. Moroto District 6. Nakapiripirit District and 7. Napak District. Abim District has got a wet and dry woodland savannah type of climate, characterized by an intensive hot season that lasts from December until February.

== Population ==
The 1991 census estimated the district population at about 47,600. The national census in 2002 estimated the population of the district at approximately 51,800. The average annual population growth rate has been determined at 0.9%, between 2002 and 2012. In 2012, the population of Abim District was estimated at 56,500. The table below illustrates how the district population has grown during the first decade of the 21st century. All figures are estimates.

Abim District Population Trends

Year	Est. Pop.
2002	51,800
2003	52,300
2004	52,800
2005	53,300

Year	Est. Pop.
2006	53,800
2007	54,300
2008	54,800
2009	55,300

Year	Est. Pop.
2010	55,800
2011	56,300

== Ethnic group ==
The main group in Abim District is the Labwor people, who are closely related to the Acholi people and the Karimojong communities. The predominant language spoken in the district is Leblango (Labwor language)

== Economic activities ==
Subsistence agriculture and animal husbandry are the main occupations of the population of the district. Many also practice animal hunting to supplement their diet. Crops grown include:

- Sorghum
- Maize
- Millet
- Peas
- Pumpkin
- Cucumber
- Beans
- Cassava
- Sunflower
- Simsim
- Groundnuts
- Upland rice
- Sweet potatoes

== Education ==
Abim District has several primary and secondary schools, although access to education remains limited due to:

- Poverty
- Distance to schools
- Climate challenges

Government and development partners continue to support education development in the district.

== Health services ==
Health services in Abim District are provided through:

- Abim General Hospital
- Health Centre IV facilities
- Health Centre III facilities

== See also ==
- Karamoja sub- region
- Kotido District
- Moroto District
- Napak District
- Abim
- Karimojong
- Karamoja
- Uganda Districts
- Northern Uganda
