= Uganda National Roads Authority =

Ugandan government agency

Coordinates: 00°19′40″N 32°36′46″E

- UNRA

Agency overview
- Formed: 2008
- Dissolved: 2024
- Superseding agency: Ministry of Works and Transport
- Jurisdiction: Uganda
- Headquarters: 3-5 New Port Bell Road; UAP Nakawa Business Park; Nakawa, Kampala
- Employees: 950 (2016) (Capacity:1,400)
- Annual budget: UGX:2.3 trillion 2015/16 financial year
- Minister responsible: Gen Edward Katumba Wamala
- Agency executive: Allen Kagina, Executive director
- Parent agency: Uganda Ministry of Transport And Works
- Website: www.unra.go.ug

The Uganda National Roads Authority (UNRA) was a government agency mandated to develop and maintain the national roads network, advise the government on general roads policy, contribute to the addressing of national transport concerns, and perform certain other functions. UNRA is charged with, among other things, the selection of contractors, the supervision of construction, the scheduling of maintenance, and the prioritization of national road works.

== Headquarters ==
The headquarters of UNRA were located in the UAP Nakawa Business Park, at 3-5 New Port Bell Road, in the Nakawa Division of Kampala, Uganda's capital and largest city. The geographical coordinates of UNRA's headquarters are:0°19'40.0"N, 32°36'46.0"E (Longitude:0.327778; Latitude:32.612778).

== Overview ==
UNRA was established in 2006 by parliamentary enactment of the Uganda National Roads Authority Act. UNRA became fully operational on 1 July 2008. UNRA closed on 23 December 2024 after president museveni signed the Repeal Bill on the 20 November

UNRA is governed by a nine-member board of directors, chaired by Angela Kanyima Kiryabwire. The first chairman of the board of directors was Mr. Chris Kassami who spearheaded the process of setting up the original UNRA management structures. The pioneer executive director was Eng. Peter Ssebanakitta who was appointed to the post on 1 November 2007 and set upon working with the Board to recruit staff into the UNRA structures. UNRA became operational on 1 July 2008 with about 80% of the established posts filled. Eng. Ssebanakitta served as executive director up to 3 March 2013 when he resigned for personal reasons. He was succeeded in acting capacity by Engineer Ssebbugga Kimeze who was subsequently replaced by Eng. James Okiror when he was suspended following the botched procurement of a contractor for the Mukono–Kyetume–Katosi–Nyenga Road. The current executive director is Allen Kagina who replaced Engineer Okiror in May 2014. She replaced acting executive director James Okiror.

== Completed projects ==
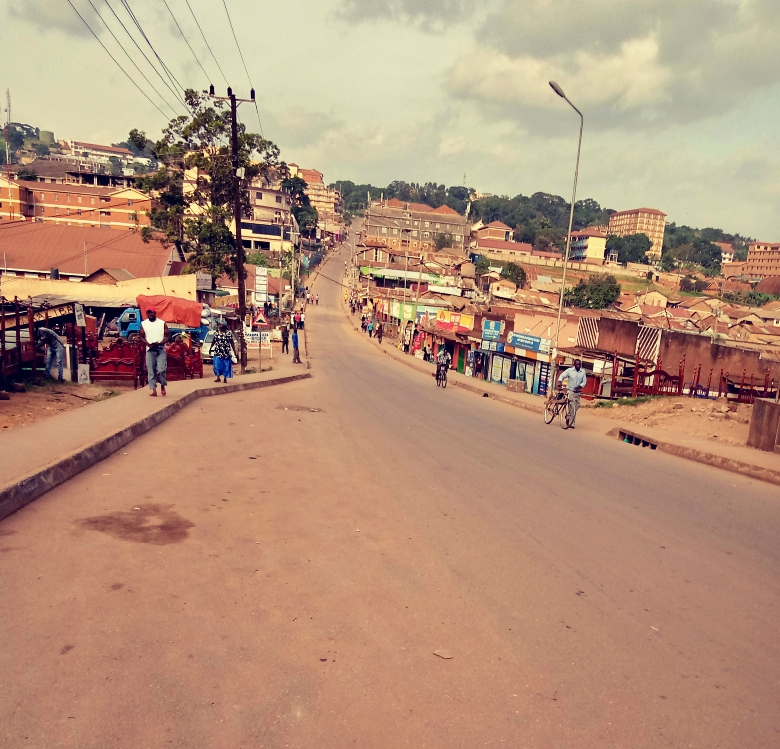
Kikoni road in Uganda

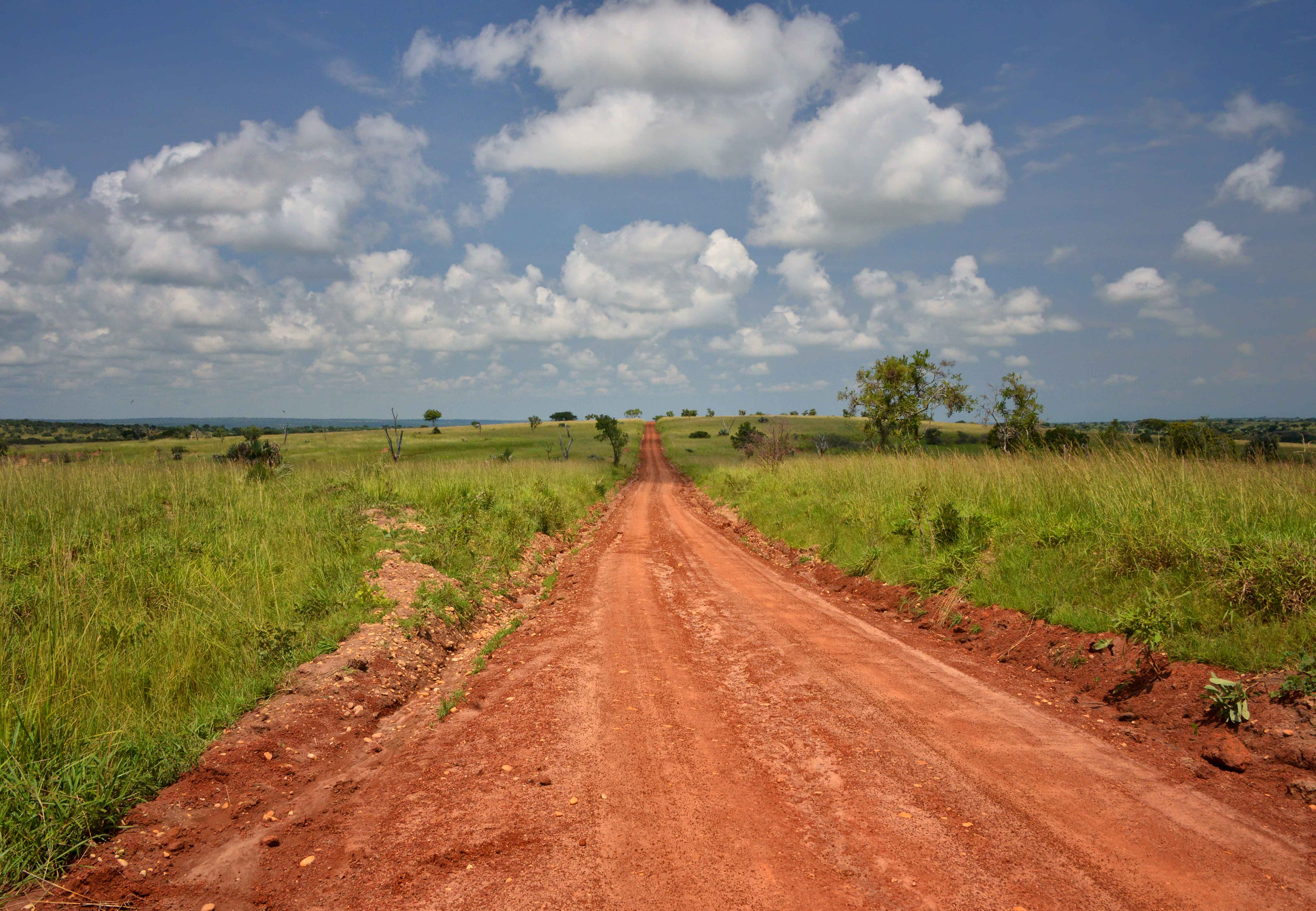
Park road under construction

During the first five years of the agency, the road network increased from 10,800 kilometres (6,700 mi) to 21,000 kilometres (13,000 mi).

According to a published report in July 2015, 4,000 kilometres (2,500 mi) (19 percent) of the 21,000 kilometres (13,000 mi) national road network was paved. A total of 1,500 kilometres (930 mi) of roads were improved from gravel to bituminous surface between 2005 and 2010. A total of 5,000 kilometres (3,107 mi) of roads are earmarked for tarmacking before December 2016.

Some of the roads that have been completed since 2008 include:

- Kabale–Kisoro–Bunagana Road (completed in 2012)
- Fort Portal–Bundibugyo–Lamia Road (completed in March 2014)
- Gayaza-Ziroobwe Road
- Matugga-Kapeeka Road
- Soroti–Dokolo–Lira Road (completed in 2010)
- Jinja–Bugiri Road (completed in 2010)
- Kampala–Mityana Road (completed in July 2012)
- Masaka–Mbarara Road
- Lira–Kamdini–Karuma Road (completed in August 2011)
- Kazo–Ibanda–Kamwenge Road (completed in March 2014)
- Nyakahita–Kazo Road (completed in February 2014)

== Ongoing construction projects ==
As of October 2017, the following major construction projects under UNRA's supervision were ongoing.

- Gulu–Atiak–Nimule Road
- Tororo–Mbale–Soroti Road
- Vurra–Arua–Koboko–Oraba Road
- Mbarara Northern Bypass Road
- Kampala Northern Bypass Highway
- Mbarara–Ntungamo–Kabale–Katuna Road
- Entebbe-Kampala Expressway
- New Jinja Bridge
- Mukono–Kyetume–Katosi–Nyenga Road
- Hoima–Kaiso–Tonya Road
- Hoima–Butiaba–Wanseko Road
- Kampala–Mpigi Expressway

== Upcoming projects ==
As of June 2015, UNRA listed the following major construction projects as upcoming:

- Kigumba–Masindi–Hoima–Kabwoya Road
- Rukungiri–Kihihi–Ishasha–Kanungu Road

== Re-organization ==
As part of a re-organization and re-structuring effort, Allen Kagina, the executive director, fired all the remaining 866 company staff and re-advertised all staff positions. The terminations were in addition to 80 managers fired in June 2015, and another 58 staff laid off in September 2015 when the procurement and weighbridge departments were outsourced. In January 2016, media reports indicated that the total staff allocation for the organization had been increased to 1,740.

== Governance ==
In March 2017, new board of directors was named to serve for three years. The members of the current board are:

1. Fred Omach: Chairman
2. Allen Kagina: Executive Director
3. Sam Bagonza: Member
4. Umar Bagampadde: Member
5. Joseph Muvawala: Member
6. Laban Mbulamuko: Member
7. Petra Sansa Tenywa: Member.

== See also ==
- Uganda Road Fund
- Transport in Uganda
- List of roads in Uganda
