= List of roads in Uganda =

The following is a list of the national roads in Uganda, which are under the jurisdiction of the Uganda National Roads Authority. The list is not exhaustive.

== National roads ==
List of national roads In Uganda
| Number | Name of road | Distance | Designated | Completed |
|---|---|---|---|---|
| 1 | Kampala Northern Bypass Highway | 24 kilometres (15 mi) | | 2009 |
| 2 | Kampala–Jinja Highway | 86 kilometres (53 mi) | | |
| 3 | Entebbe–Kampala Expressway | | 2012 | 2018 |
| 4 | Gayaza–Ziroobwe Road | | 2008 | 2011 |
| 5 | Matugga–Kapeeka Road | | | |
| 6 | Kabale–Kisoro–Bunagana Road | | | 2012 |
| 7 | Kabarole–Bundibugyo Road | | | |
| 8 | Gulu–Nimule Road | | 2012 | |
| 9 | Mbarara Northern Bypass Road | | 2015 | |
| 10 | Hoima–Kaiso–Tonya Road | | 2011 | 2014 |
| 11 | Mukono–Katosi Road | | 2014 | |
| 12 | Vurra–Oraba Road | | 2012 | 2015 (expected) |
| 13 | Hoima–Wanseko Road | | 2015 | |
| 14 | Moroto–Nakapiripirit Road | | | 2016 (expected) |
| 15 | Mbarara–Kikagati Road | 74 kilometres (46 mi) | 2011 | 2014 |
| 16 | Masaka–Bukakata Road | 41 kilometres (25 mi) | | |
| 17 | Rukungiri–Kanungu Road | | | |
| 18 | Ishaka–Kagamba Road | | 2012 | 2015 (expected) |
| 19 | Ntungamo–Mirama Hills Road | | 2014 | |
| 20 | Kayunga–Galiraya Road | | 2016 (expected) | |
| 21 | Mbale–Lwakhakha Road | | 2016 (expected) | |
| 22 | Acholibur–Olwiyo Road | | 2015 | 2018 (expected) |
| 23 | Rwekunye–Musingo Road | | 2015 | TBD |
| 24 | Nyakahita–Fort Portal Road | 208 kilometres (129 mi) | | 2016 |
| 25 | Mpigi–Sembabule Road | 135 kilometres (84 mi) | 2014 | 2017 |
| 26 | Kigumba–Kabwoya Road | 135 kilometres (84 mi) | 2014 | |
| 27 | Musita–Busia Road | 105 kilometres (65 mi) | 2015 | 2017 |
| 28 | Mubende–Kagadi Road | | 2015 | |
| 29 | Kyenjojo–Kabwoya Road | | | |
| 30 | Ziroobwe–Wobulenzi Road | 24 kilometres (15 mi) | | |
| 31 | Tororo–Mbale–Soroti Road. | 158 kilometres (98 mi) | 2010 | 2015 |
| 32 | Mbarara–Ntungamo–Kabale–Katuna Road | 125 kilometres (78 mi) | 2011 | |
| 33 | Soroti–Dokolo–Lira Road | 125 kilometres (78 mi) | 2007 | 2010 |
| 34 | Kapchorwa–Suam Road | 77 kilometres (48 mi) | 2016 (expected) | |
| 35 | Muyembe–Nakapiripirit Road | 117 kilometres (73 mi) | 2016 (expected) | |
| 36 | Jinja–Kamuli–Mbulamuti Road | | 2012 | |
| 37 | Mukono–Kayunga–Njeru Road | 94 kilometres (58 mi) | | |
| 38 | Soroti–Katakwi–Moroto–Lokitanyala Road | 208 kilometres (129 mi) | | |
| 39 | Ntungamo–Rukungiri Road | 52 kilometres (32 mi) | 2004 | 2005 |
| 40 | Soroti–Amuria–Abim–Kotido Road | 192 kilometres (119 mi) | | |
| 41 | Kampala–Mpigi Expressway | 36 kilometres (22 mi) | 2023 (expected) | |
| 42 | Lusalira–Nkonge–Lumegere–Sembabule Road | 97 kilometres (60 mi) | | 2022 |
| 43 | Nakawuka–Kasanje–Mpigi Road | 34 kilometres (21 mi) | 2023 | |
| 44 | Kitgum–Kidepo Road | 116 kilometres (72 mi) | 2024 | |
| 45 | Kabwoya–Buhuka Road | 43 kilometres (27 mi) | 2024 | 2027 |

== See also ==
- Economy of Uganda
- Transport in Uganda
- Kinshasa Highway
