= Uganda Bureau of Statistics =

Uganda government statistical agency

Coordinates: 00°18′58″N 32°35′05″E

- UBOS

Agency overview
- Formed: 1998; 28 years ago
- Jurisdiction: Government of Uganda
- Headquarters: Statistics House; Nakasero, Kampala, Uganda
- Agency executives: Albert Byamugisha (PhD), Chairman; Chris Mukiza, Executive Director
- Parent agency: Uganda Ministry of Finance and Economic Planning
- Website: Homepage

The Uganda Bureau of Statistics (UBOS) is an agency of the Ugandan government. Formed by the Uganda Bureau of Statistics Act, 1998, the agency is mandated to "coordinate, monitor and supervise Uganda's National Statistical System".

== Location ==
The headquarters of UBOS are located in Statistics House, at Plot 9 Colville Street on Nakasero Hill, in Kampala, Uganda's capital and largest city. This is at the corner of Colville Street and Nile Avenue. The coordinates of Statistics House are 0°18'58.0"N, 32°35'05.0"E (Latitude:0.316111; Longitude:32.584722).

== Overview ==
The agency is supervised by the Uganda Ministry of Finance, Planning and Economic Development. UBOS is governed by a seven-person board of directors. Its scope of work includes conducting a national population census at least once every 10 years or so. The last national census was conducted in May 2024. The exercise cost an estimated UGX:75 billion and created an estimated 150,000 temporary jobs. The agency also publishes regular economic surveys and forecasts, including the monthly inflation figures for the country.

== See also ==
- Bank of Uganda
- Uganda Revenue Authority
- Economy of Uganda
