= Isingiro District =

- District
- District location in Uganda
- Coordinates: 00°50′S 30°50′E
- Country: Uganda
- Region: Western Uganda
- Sub-region: Ankole sub-region
- Established: 1 July 2005
- Capital: Isingiro

Area
  - Total: 2,655.6 km^{2} (1,025.3 sq mi)

Population (2012 Estimate)
  - Total: 420,200
  - Density: 158.2/km^{2} (410/sq mi)
- Time zone: UTC+3 (EAT)
- Area code: 062
- Website: www.isingiro.go.ug

Isingiro District is a district in the Western Region of Uganda. The town of Isingiro is the district's main municipal, administrative, and commercial center.

== Location ==
Isingiro District is bordered by Kiruhura District to the north, Rakai District to the east, Tanzania to the south, Ntungamo District to the west, and Mbarara District to the north-west. The town of Isingiro is approximately 35 kilometres (22 mi) south-east of the city of Mbarara, the main metropolitan area in the Ankole sub-region.

== Population ==
The 2014 national housing and population census estimated the population of Isingiro District at 486,360. In 2002, the population was recorded at approximately 316,000, while the 1991 national census estimated the population at 226,400.

== Prominent people ==
Prominent people from the district include:

- Gordon Wavamunno is an entrepreneur, businessman, and philanthropist. He is reported to be one of the wealthiest people in Uganda and is the chancellor of Nkumba University
- Benon Biraaro was a retired military officer, entrepreneur, and aspiring politician. (deceased)
- Bright Rwamirama, is a retired military officer and politician. State Minister for Animal Industry in the Ugandan Cabinet. Also serves as the elected member of parliament representing Isingiro County North in Isingiro District

== Economic activity ==
- Bananas(matooke)
- Maize
- Sorghum
- Sweet potatoes

== See also ==
- Districts of Uganda
- Ankole sub-region
- Districts of Uganda

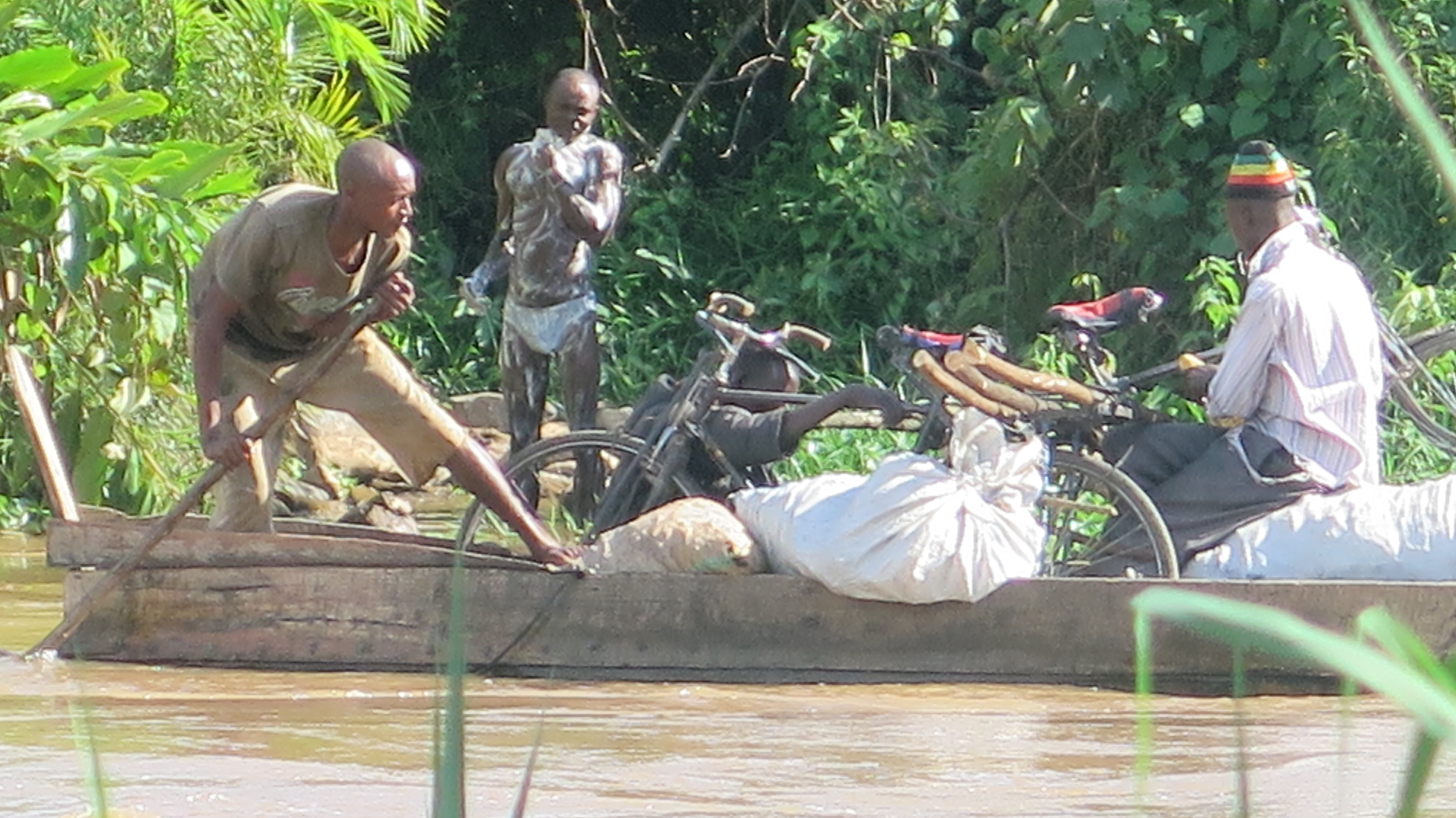
Small traders transport charcoal on a rickety boat across River Kagera in Kajaho, Isingiro District on the Uganda-Tanzania border.
