= Rubona, Bunyangabu =

Rubona
- Location in Uganda; Placement on map is approximate
- Coordinates: 00°33′35″N 30°10′44″E
- Country: Uganda
- Region: Western Uganda
- District: Bunyangabu District
- Municipality: Rubona Town Council
- County: Bunyangabu

Government
  - MP: Adolf Mwesige

Population (2014 census)
  - Total: 5,627
  - Summer (DST): UTC0°33'35.0"N 30°10'44.0"E

Rubona is a town in the Western Region of Uganda.

== Location ==
Rubona is located along the Fort Portal–Kasese–Mpondwe Road, approximately 21 kilometres (13 mi), by road, southwest of Fort Portal, the largest city in Toro sub-region. This is approximately 318 kilometres (198 mi), by road, west of Kampala, the capital and largest city of Uganda. The geographical coordinates of Rubona are: 0°33'35.0"N, 30°10'44.0"E (Latitude:0.559722; Longitude:30.178889).

== Population ==
The national population census and household survey conducted during August 2014, enumerated the population of Rubona Town Council at 5,627 people.

== Points of interest ==
The following pints of interest are found in the town or near its borders: (a) the offices of Rubona Town council, (b) the offices of Rubona sub-county, (c) Rubona central market, (d) the Fort Portal–Kasese–Mpondwe Road, passes through the town in a general northeast to southwest direction. and (e) Rubona Stock Farm, a livestock farm sitting on 746.9 acres (302 ha), of farmland. The farm is owned by the government of Uganda and is managed by the National Animal Genetic Resources Centre & Data Bank (NAGRC & DB), an institution of the Uganda Ministry of Agriculture, Animal Industry and Fisheries.

== See also ==
- Kibiito
- Rwimi
- Adolf Mwesige
