= African Rural University =

University in Kagadi, Uganda

- Type: Private
- Established: 2009
- Vice-Chancellor: Dr. Mwalimu Musheshe
- Location: Kagadi, Kagadi District, Uganda; 00°56′32″N 30°49′10″E
- Campus: Rural
- Website: Homepage
- Location within Uganda

African Rural University is a university in Uganda.

== Location ==
The main campus of African Rural University is located in the town of Kagadi, Kagadi District, Bunyoro sub-region in the Western Region of Uganda. This is approximately 265 kilometres (165 mi), by road, west of Kampala, the country's capital and largest city. The coordinates of the university are 0°56'32.0"N, 30°49'10.0"E (Latitude:0.942222; Longitude:30.819444).

== History ==
African Rural University was established in 2006 and accredited by the Uganda National Council for Higher Education in 2011.

It was the first university in Africa that has focused on teaching sustainable agriculture exclusively to women. The course work is 60 percent theoretical teaching and 40 percent practical implementation.

== Academics ==
As of July 2014, the university offered only one degree course, the Bachelor of Science in Technologies for Rural Transformation. It is a four-year course, consisting of three years of academic study and one year of practical field activity. Each year of classroom study is divided into two semesters lasting seventeen weeks each. Each admission class is limited to thirty female students. There are plans to introduce degrees in agribusiness and rural finance.

== See also ==
- Education in Uganda
- Agriculture in Uganda
- List of university leaders in Uganda
- List of universities in Uganda
