= Rubona =

Rubona may refer to one of the following:

- Rubona, Bunyangabu, a town in Bunyangabu District, Western Uganda.
- Rubona, Rwanda, a neighborhood in Rubavu District, Western Province, Rwanda.
