= Lawrence Akugizibwe =

Ugandan politician

Honorable

Personal details
- Born: Lawrence Akugizibwe; 2 November 1985 (age 40) Kyenjojo, Uganda
- Citizenship: Uganda
- Education: Mountains of the Moon University (BSc Horticulture & Entrepreneurship) (MSc Natural Resource Management); Atlantic International University (PhD in Agriculture and Rural Innovations)
- Occupation: Horticulturist, politician
- Known for: Horticulture, politics

Lawrence Akugizibwe (born 2 November 1985) is a Ugandan horticulturist, agropreneur, author, conservationist and politician. He is the elected Member of Parliament for Mwenge County North and a representative for NRM, the ruling political party in Uganda. He is a member of the Committee on HIV/AIDS & Related Diseases and the Vice Chairperson of the Committee on Agriculture in the 10th Parliament of Uganda.

A former NAADS coordinator, Akugizibwe is the secretary of the Rwenzori Parliamentary Group, the secretary for youth affairs in the NRM Youth League, the NRM chairperson of Mwenge County North, the board chairperson of St Klaus Comprehensive Trade School, the secretary of the Catholic Workers Movement for the Roman Catholic Diocese of Fort Portal, a mobilizer for the Tooro Peoples Conference and a member of the NRM Parliamentary Caucus.

== Early life and education ==
Akugizibwe was born in Kitaihuka Parish, Nyankwanzi Sub-county, Kyenjojo District into a Catholic family of the Batooro. His father, Vincent Nyakoojo was a parish chief and his mother, Apollonia Tugume, a farmer. He is the sixth of twelve children and a brother to Fr. Bernard Bitekerezo, the holder of a doctorate in Catholic theology.

He had his primary education in his home district of Kyenjojo at Igongwe Primary School and Muhorro Muslim Primary School where he attained his PLE certification in 2001. He then attended St. Leo's College, Kyegobe for both his O-Level and A-Level education, attaining a UCE certification in 2004 and a UACE certification in 2006. He graduated from Mountains of the Moon University in 2012 with a Bachelor of Science in Horticulture & Entrepreneurship and in 2015 earned a Master of Science in Natural Resource Management. He also holds a PhD in Agriculture and Rural Innovations from Atlantic International University, Hawaii.

== Career and politics ==
Before joining university in 2009, Akugizibwe worked as an English teacher for 2 1/2 years at St. Maria Salome School, Dar es Salaam. While at university, he worked as a researcher for PROTOS Uganda and Mountains of the Moon University.

On finishing his bachelor's, he was employed as a Greenhouse manager at Royal Van Zanten Uganda in 2012, then as an agricultural expert in 2013 for HEWASA: the water, sanitation and hygiene department of Caritas Fort Portal. In 2014, Akugizibwe secured employment as a NAADS coordinator for Bufunjo Subcounty in Kyenjojo District.

In 2015, Akugizibwe resigned from NAADS to join elective politics on the NRM ticket where he defeated eight candidates in the party's primaries among whom was the then incumbent David Muhumuza. He went on to win the general elections in 2016 and became a member of the 10th Parliament for the Pearl of Africa representing Mwenge County North in Kyenjojo District.

In the 10th Parliament, Akugizibwe serves on the Committee on HIV/AIDS & Related Diseases and the Committee on Agriculture. He is a member of: the Parliamentary Forum for Climate Change Uganda (PFCC-U) ; the Uganda Parliamentarians Forum on Food Security, Population and Development (UPFFSP&D); the Uganda Parliamentary Forum on Youth Affairs (UPFYA) and; the NRM Parliamentary Caucus. He is also the secretary of the Rwenzori Parliamentary Group.

== Personal details ==
Akugizibwe is an author, a singer, a conservationist and a promoter of agrotourism.

== Books and publications ==
1. The Role of Biorationals in the Control of a Bean Bruchid
2. Jealousy is Sand in My Eyes
3. Sustainable Forest Conservation in Uganda

== See also ==
- Kyenjojo District
