= Buhimba–Nalweyo–Kakindu–Bulamagi Road =

Road in Uganda

Coordinates: 01°07′24″N 31°15′06″E

Route information
- Length: 32 mi (51 km)
- History: Designated in 2018; Upgrading expected completion in 2020

Major junctions
- North end: Buhimba
- Nalweyo; Kakindu
- South end: Bulamagi

Location
- Country: Uganda

Highway system
- Roads in Uganda

The Buhimba–Nalweyo–Kakindu–Bulamagi Road is a road in the Western Region of Uganda, connecting the town of Buhimba in Hoima District with the towns of Nalweyo, Kakindu and Bulamagi, in Kakumiro District.

== Location ==
The road starts at Buhimba, approximately 11 kilometres (7 mi), south of the city of Hoima, the capital of the sub-region. The road runs in a general southern direction, crosses River Kafu to Nalweyo, in Kakumiro District. From Nalweyo, the road runs in a general southwesterly direction, through Kakindu to end at Bulamagi, a total distance of about 52 kilometres (32 mi). The geographical coordinates of this road, immediately west of Nalweyo are: 01°07'24.0"N, 31°15'06.0"E (Latitude:1.123333; Longitude:31.251667).

== Overview ==
This road is one of the roads planned for upgrade and renovation as Uganda prepares the region for oil production, with first oil anticipated in 2021.

== Upgrading to tarmac ==
Prior to 2018, this road was gravel-surface in poor condition, with gullies and pot-holes. In January 2018, the Uganda National Roads Authority awarded the renovation contract to China Wuyi Industrial Company (CWIC). The work is funded with a US$50 million loan from Exim Bank of China.

The upgrading of the road involved the conversion of the then existing gravel surface to tarmac and the building of bridges and drainage channels, bridges, intersections and related infrastructure. As of April 2018, the contractor was in the pre-construction mobilization stage.

== Controversy ==
In August 2018, the Uganda's Public Procurement and Disposal of Public Assets Authority (PPDA), halted the procurement of an engineering consultant for this road and for the connecting Bulamagi–Igayaza–Kakumiro Road, citing irregularities in the process. The procurement has to be re-advertised from the start.

== See also ==
- Hoima District
- Kakumiro District
- Economy of Uganda
- List of cities and towns in Uganda
- List of roads in Uganda
