= Bulamagi–Igayaza–Kakumiro Road =

Road in Uganda

Coordinates: 01°57′19″N 31°09′05″E

Route information
- Length: 26 mi (42 km)
- History: Designated in 2018; Expected completion in 2020

Major junctions
- North end: Bulamagi
- Igayaza
- South end: Kakumiro

Location
- Country: Uganda

Highway system
- Roads in Uganda

Bulamagi–Igayaza–Kakumiro Road is a road in the Western Region of Uganda, connecting the town of Bulamagi, in Kakumiro District to the town of Kakumiro, the capital and largest urban center in the district.

== Location ==
The road starts at Bulamagi, and continues in a general southeasterly direction, through Igayaza, to end at Kakumiro in the oil-rich Albertine Graben, a distance of approximately 42 kilometres (26 mi).

== Upgrading to bitumen ==
The government of Uganda has earmarked this road for upgrading through the conversion of the existing gravel road to bitumen surface and the building of bridges, drainage channels, culverts and intersections.

In January 2018, the Uganda National Roads Authority (UNRA), on behalf of the government of Uganda, awarded the renovation contract to China Wuyi Industrial Company (CWIC). The renovation is funded in part, by a $40 million loan provided by the Exim Bank of China. Other credible sources have quoted the combined renovation price for this road and the connecting Buhimba–Nalweyo–Kakindu–Bulamagi Road at US$138 million.

As of April 2018, the contractor was in the pre-construction mobilization phase.

== Controversy ==
In August 2018, the Uganda's Public Procurement and Disposal of Public Assets Authority (PPDA), halted the procurement of an engineering consultant for this road and for the connecting Buhimba–Nalweyo–Kakindu–Bulamagi Road, citing irregularities in the process. The procurement has to be re-advertised from the start.

== See also ==
- Hoima District
- Uganda Oil Refinery
- Economy of Uganda
- Uganda–Tanzania Crude Oil Pipeline
