= Pearl Bank =

Ugandan financial institution

Pearl Bank Uganda
- Company type: Parastatal
- Industry: Financial services
- Founded: 1926; 100 years ago
- Headquarters: Roscoe Road, Kololo; Kampala, Uganda
- Key people: Andrew Otengo Owiny; Chairperson; Julius Kakeeto; Managing Director / Chief Executive Officer
- Products: Loans, checking, savings, investments
- Revenue: ▲Aftertax:UGX:47.3 billion (US$12,718,918) (2025)
- Total assets: UGX:1.875 trillion (US$504,185,437) (2025)
- Number of employees: 1,153 (2023)
- Website: www.pearlbank.co.ug

Pearl Bank Uganda Limited is a commercial bank in Uganda, licensed and supervised by the Bank of Uganda, the country's central bank and national banking regulator. The bank was formerly known as PostBank Uganda.

The institution received her tier-1 banking license in December 2021. Before that, Pearl Bank Uganda was classified as a non-bank credit institution, still under the supervision of the Bank of Uganda.

== Overview ==
As of December 2025, Pearl Bank Uganda had total assets worth UGX:UGX:1.875 trillion (US$504.9), with shareholders' equity of UGX: 239.8 billion (US$64.5 million). At that time, the bank's customer deposits totaled UGX:790 billion (approx. US$381 million) and its loan book stood at UGX:749 billion (approx. US$201.4 million).

== History ==
Pearl Bank Uganda has been in existence since 1926. It started out as a department in the Post Office. In February 1998 PostBank Uganda Limited was incorporated in accordance with the Communications Act of 1997 to take over the operations of the former Post Office Savings department. Pearl Bank Uganda was incorporated under the Companies Act in February 1998 as a limited liability company. The bank's operations are supervised by the Bank of Uganda under the Financial Institutions Act. Before December 2021, it was classified as a Tier II Institution (Non-Bank Credit Institution), by the Bank of Uganda (BOU). That month, it received a Tier I banking license from BOU.

In June 2025, the bank officially announced its rebrand to Pearl Bank Uganda Limited, pending final regulatory approval from the Bank of Uganda. In November 2025, Pearl Bank came out officially to the public. The name "Pearl Bank" is inspired by Uganda's global identity as the "Pearl of Africa." It reflects the bank's deep national roots, modern outlook, and purpose-driven ambition to foster prosperity for all Ugandans.

== Ownership ==
Pearl Bank Uganda is wholly owned by the Government of Uganda.

== Branch network ==
As of February 2021, Pearl Bank Uganda maintained a branch network of 33 fixed branches and 17 mobile banking units, totaling 50 branches.

=== Fixed branches ===
1. Arua Branch - Arua
2. Bombo Branch - Bombo
3. Bugolobi Branch - Bugoloobi, Kampala
4. Bulenga Branch - Bulenga
5. City Branch - Nkrumah Road, Kampala (Head Office)
6. Entebbe Branch - Entebbe
7. Fort Portal Branch - Fort Portal
8. Gulu Branch - Gulu
9. Hoima Branch - Hoima
10. Iganga Branch - Iganga
11. Jinja Branch - Jinja
12. Kabale Branch - Kabale
13. Kakiri Branch - Kakiri
14. Kampala Road Branch - Kampala Road, Kampala
15. Kamwenge Branch - Kamwenge
16. Kanungu Branch - Kanungu
17. Kasese Branch - Kasese
18. Kayunga Branch - Kayunga
19. Kitgum Branch - Kitgum
20. Lacor Branch - Lacor Hospital, Gulu
21. Lira Branch - Lira
22. Masaka Branch - Masaka
23. Mbale Branch - Mbale
24. Mbarara Branch - Mbarara
25. Mubende Branch - Mubende
26. Mukono Branch - Mukono
27. Nakasongola Branch - Nakasongola
28. Ndeeba Branch - Ndeeba, Kampala
29. Ntungamo Branch - Ntungamo
30. Soroti Branch - Soroti
31. Wandegeya Branch - Wandegeya, Kampala
32. William Street - Kampala.
33. Anaka Branch - Nwoya

=== Mobile branches ===
The mobile branches are located in the following towns and districts:

1. Budaka - Budaka District
2. Bududa - Bududa District
3. Bukedea - Bukedea District
4. Butaleja - Butaleja District
5. Fort Portal - Kabarole District
6. Kamwenge - Kamwenge District
7. Kapchorwa - Kapchorwa District
8. Kibaale - Kibaale District
9. Kyegegwa - Kyegegwa District
10. Kyenjojo - Kyenjojo District
11. Manafwa - Manafwa District
12. Pallisa - Pallisa District
13. Sironko - Sironko District
14. Tororo - Tororo District

== Governance ==
The activities of Pearl Bank Uganda are directed by its board of directors. As of February 2021, the chairperson of the board was Andrew Otenga Owiny. The day-to-day activities of the bank are supervised by a team of ten bank managers, headed by the managing director. As of November 2019, the managing director and chief executive officer is Julius Kakeeto.

== Rebrand ==
In June 2025, the shareholders of the bank, approved the name change from PostBank Uganda to Pearl Bank Uganda. The rebrand required approval from the Bank of Uganda.

== See also ==
- Banking in Uganda
- List of banks in Uganda
