= Bwamiramira =

- Location in Uganda
- Coordinates: 00°46′57″N 31°02′15″E
- Country: Uganda
- Region: Western Uganda
- Sub-region: Bunyoro sub-region
- District: Kibaale District
- Elevation: 4,130 ft (1,260 m)

Bwamiramira is a town in Uganda.

== Location ==
Bwamiramira is in Buyanja County, Kibaale District, Bunyoro sub-region, in the Western Region of Uganda. It is approximately 5 kilometres (3.1 mi), by road, west of the town of Kibaale, where the district headquarters are located. This is approximately 216 kilometres (134 mi), by road, west of Kampala, Uganda's capital and largest city. The coordinates of the town are:0°46'57.0"N, 31°02'15.0" (Latitude:0.7825; Longitude:31.0375).

== Points of interest ==
The following points of interest lie within the town limits or close to its edges:

- Bwamiramira Town Council
- Bwamiramira central market
- Mubende-Kagadi highway passes through the eastern part of the town
- town of Kibaale, where the district headquarters are located, lies approximately 5 kilometres (3.1 mi), by road, east of Bwamiramira

== See also ==
- Bunyoro
