= Mubende–Kakumiro–Kibaale–Kagadi Road =

Ugandan road

Coordinates: 00°46′14″N 31°05′17″E

Route information
- Length: 66.5 mi (107.0 km)
- History: Designation in 2016; Completion in 2020

Major junctions
- South end: Mubende
- Kakumiro; Kibaale
- North end: Kagadi

Location
- Country: Uganda

Highway system
- Roads in Uganda

Mubende–Kakumiro–Kibaale–Kagadi Road is a road in Uganda's Central Region and Western Region, connecting the towns of Mubende in Mubende District to Kakumiro, Kibaale and Kagadi in Kibaale District.

== Location ==
The road starts at Mubende, at the Mubende–Kyegegwa–Kyenjojo–Fort Portal Road, about 150 kilometres (93 mi) west of the Kampala, Uganda's capital and largest city. The road continues in a northerly direction to Kakumiro, about 32 kilometres (20 mi), north of Mubende.

From Kakumiro, the road turns westwards to Kibaale, and then northwestwards to Kagadi where in joins the Kyenjojo–Kabwoya Road, a distance of about 75 kilometres (47 mi) from Kakumiro.

== Upgrading to bitumen ==
As far back as 2010, the Ugandan government began making plans to tar this road. However, by May 2015, work on the road was yet to begin. As at November 2014, bid evaluations were ongoing. The road works are fully funded by the government of Uganda.

== Construction ==
The construction contract was awarded to China Communications Construction Company (CCCC), at a contract price of UGX:484.887 billion (approx. US$132 million). The supervising engineer was a consortium comprising AIC Progetti SPA and Prome Consultants Limited. The construction contract began in February 2016 and was scheduled to be completed in February 2019. Completion was later revised to 23 January 2020.

As of July 2020, the upgrade to class II bitumen standard, with drainage channels, culverts and shoulders had been completed. In September 2021, Allen Kagina, the executive director of UNRA, listed this road among those completed during the financial year 2020/2021 (1 July 2020–30 June 2021).

== See also ==
- List of roads in Uganda
- Economy of Uganda
- Transport in Uganda
