= Mubende–Kyegegwa–Kyenjojo–Fort Portal Road =

Road in Uganda

Coordinates: 00°36′21″N 30°39′41″E

Route information
- Length: 109 mi (175 km)

Major junctions
- East end: Mubende
- Kyegegwa; Kyenjojo
- West end: Fort Portal

Location
- Country: Uganda

Highway system
- Roads in Uganda

The Mubende–Kyegegwa–Kyenjojo–Fort Portal Road, also Mubende–Fort Portal Road is a road in the Central and Western Regions of Uganda, connecting the towns of Mubende, in Mubende District, Kyegegwa in Kyegegwa District, Kyenjojo in Kyenjojo District and Fort Portal in Kabarole District.

== Location ==
The road starts at Mubende and travels westwards through Kyegegwa, and Kyenjojo, to end at Fort Portal, a distance of about 145 kilometres (90 mi).

== Overview ==
This road is part of the Kampala–Mityana–Mubende–Fort Portal transport corridor. It is part of the East African road network, connecting Kenya, Uganda and DR Congo. It is the primary gateway for tourists while visiting Kibaale National Park.

== Upgrading to bitumen ==
The road was upgraded to class II bituminous standard between 2001 and 2003. In October 2025, the government of Uganda began renovating the Mubende-Kyegegwa-Kyenjojo section of this road, which had fallen into disrepair. The cost to repair the 89.3 kilometres (55 mi) road section is budgetted to cost UGX190 billion (US$54,283,000) and last 18 months.

== See also ==
- Kyenjojo–Kabwoya Road
- Uganda National Roads Authority
