= Kakeeto =

Kakeeto is a surname. Notable people with the surname include:

- Julius Kakeeto, Ugandan accountant
- Robert Kakeeto (born 1995), Ugandan footballer
