= Andrew Kabeera =

Ugandan businessman and corporate executive

- Born: c. 1981 (age 44–45); Uganda
- Education: Makerere University; Uganda Martyrs University
- Occupations: Businessman and corporate executive
- Years active: 2010–present
- Title: Executive director at PostBank Uganda

Andrew Kabeera (born c. 1981) is a Ugandan businessman and incumbent executive director at PostBank Uganda. He took up his current assignment in July 2020. Immediately before that, he was the chief operating officer at DFCU Bank, another large commercial bank in Uganda.

== Background and education ==
Kabeera was born in Uganda c. 1981. After attending local primary and secondary schools, he was admitted to Makerere University, Uganda's largest and oldest public university. He graduated with a Bachelor of Arts degree in Economics. Later, he obtained a Master of Business Administration degree, in accounting and finance from Uganda Martyrs University.

== Career ==
Kabeera joined Standard Chartered Uganda, while still a postgraduate student at Uganda Martyrs University. He served there as head of Consumer Banking Operations for four years. His experience covers a wide range of service areas, including data management, systems management, risk management, ATM management, mobile banking, and online banking. He was then promoted to the position of head of Consumer Banking Operations, serving in that capacity for one and one half years. He spent the final 2.5 years working as the head of corporate and institutional banking and head of commercial banking operations at Standard Chartered Bank Uganda.

In June 2018, he was hired by DFCU Bank, working there as the chief operating officer and concurrently serving as chief digital and innovation officer at the bank for 2.25 years. Over the course of his work since 2010, Kabeera has been exposed to banking operations in a number of countries including Kenya, Malaysia, Nigeria, Singapore, United Arab Emirates, Uganda and Zambia.

In June 2020, Kabeera was hired by PostBank Uganda as the executive director and chief operating officer (CFO) of the bank. This was during the reorganization period, as PostBank was preparing to transition from a Tier III microfinance institution to a fully fledged Tier I commercial bank.
