= John Coote (disambiguation) =

John Coote may refer to:

- John H. Coote, physiologist and autonomic neuroscience specialist
- John Methuen Coote, British colonial administrator
- John Coote (bookseller), 18th-century bookseller; see The Lady's Magazine

== See also ==
- John Cootes (born 1941), rugby league footballer and Roman Catholic priest
