= Kyegegwa =

- Map of Uganda showing the location of Kyegegwa.
- Coordinates: 00°28′49″N 31°03′17″E
- Country: Uganda
- Region: Western Region of Uganda
- Sub-region: Toro sub-region
- District: Kyegegwa District
- Elevation: 1,400 m (4,600 ft)

Population (2020 Estimate)
  - Total: 29,400
- Time zone: UTC+3 (EAT)

Kyegegwa is a town in the Western Region of Uganda. It is the main municipal, administrative, and commercial center of Kyegegwa District.

== Location ==
Kyegegwa is located on the Mubende–Kyegegwa–Kyenjojo–Fort Portal Road, the main highway between Mubende and Fort Portal. Kyegegwa is approximately 103.5 kilometres (64.3 mi) by road east of Fort Portal, the largest city in the Toro sub-region. This is approximately 192.5 kilometres (119.6 mi), by road, west of Kampala, the capital of and largest city in Uganda.

The geographical coordinates of the town are 0°28'49.0"N, 31°03'17.0"E (Latitude:0.480278; Longitude:31.054722).

== Population ==
The national census of September 2002, enumerated 6,747 inhabitants in Kyegegwa Town. In 2014, the national population census put the population at 18,729.

In 2015, the Uganda Bureau of Statistics (UBOS) estimated the population of the town at 20,000 people. In 2020, the statistics agency estimated the mid-year population of Kyegegwa Town Council at 29,400 people. Of these, 14,700 (50 percent) were females and 14,700 (50 percent) were males. UBOS calculated that the population of the town increased at an average annual rate of 8 percent, between 2015 and 2020.

Historical population
Year	Pop.	±%
2002	6,747	—
2014	18,729	+177.6%
2015	20,000	+6.8%
2020	29,400	+47.0%

== Points of interest ==
The following points of interest lie within the town, or near its borders: (a) the headquarters of Kyegegwa District Administration (b) the offices of Kyegegwa Town Council and (c) Kyegegwa Central Market.

The Mubende–Kyegegwa–Kyenjojo–Fort Portal Road passes through the middle of town in a general east to west direction.

A mobile banking unit of PostBank Uganda serves the town once a week.

== See also ==
- Toro Kingdom
- List of cities and towns in Uganda
