= Burungu =

- Location within Democratic Republic of the Congo
- Coordinates: 1.336360°S 29.022483°E
- Country: Democratic Republic of the Congo
- Province: North Kivu
- Territory: Masisi
- Chiefdom: Bashali
- Elevation: 1,824 m (5,984 ft)
- Time zone: UTC+2 (CAT)

Burungu is a settlement in the North Kivu province of the Democratic Republic of the Congo.

== Location ==
Burungu is in the Masisi Territory of North Kivu, to the southwest of Kitchanga. It is on the RP1030 road from Kitchanga south to Lake Kivu. It is about 40 kilometres (25 mi) from the provincial capital of Goma.

== History ==
At the start of the Kivu frontier incident in 1909 the British commissioner John Methuen Coote entered the Belgian territory through a band of territory that a German map showed to belong to the British. He advanced quickly in night stages and reached the shore of Lake Kivu near Goma. Coote established fortified camps at Burungu and Rubona (Lubuna).

On the night of 5–6 February 2001 the nearby volcano Nyamuragira began erupting. The villages of Burungu, Kirolirwe and Kitshanga suffered damage from clouds of volcanic ash that included burnt out market gardens, banana plantations and pastures, destruction of many types of trees, pollution of water sources, respiratory problems, flu, headaches, diarrhoea, conjunctivitis and miscarriages. Cattle were also affected.

The region has long suffered from violence. In 2005 there were 500 to 700 troops of the 53rd Battalion based in Burungu, many of them Congolese Tutsis who had formerly belonged to the rebel Rally for Congolese Democracy (RCD). In September 2005 it was reported that the troops had deserted, then two days later that they had returned to base. It seems that the troops, who were about to be taken to another army center, had fled out of fear that they were to be killed. In June 2010 at least 19 people died in a night attack against the army base in Burungu. At first it was thought the attack had been launched by the Democratic Forces for the Liberation of Rwanda (FDLR), but later it was claimed by a new militia calling itself the Front for the Liberation of Congo (FPLC). (Note: The Front for the Liberation of Congo (FPLC) was led by General Gad Ngabo. He had entered North Kivu from Uganda recently, and was said to be recruiting from different ethnic groups and aiming to displace the National Congress for the Defence of the People (CNDP) in control of some parts of the province.)

In November 2010 officers under the command of Lt. Col. Zimurinda visited schools in the Kitchanga area listing male students aged 15 to 20. In the weeks that followed soldiers loyal to Zimurinda's superior General Bosco Ntaganda began taking the youth away as they walked to or from school. A 22-year-old man was shot in Burungu when he tried to escape and died soon after. In May 2012 fighting erupted between government troops and "mutineers", and thousands of refugees began fleeing to Rwanda. A student from Burungu took five days to reach Rwanda, compared to one day in normal times, and was stopped 12 times during the journey by government soldiers or rebels.

== Sources ==
- "AWOL soldiers return to base", The New Humanitarian, 2 September 2005
- DRC: Who's who among armed groups in the east, TNH, 15 June 2010
- Information on violence in Masisi (North Kivu - DRC) in June/July 2010 (PDF), Refugee Documentation Centre (Ireland)
- Lederer, André (1993), "Incident de frontière au Kivu", Civilisations (in French), 41, doi:10.4000/civilisations.1730
- "Node: Burungu (1158948333)", OpenStreetMap
- "North Kivu in turmoil again", Refworld, IRIN, 16 May 2012
- Rogue Leaders, Rebels Forcibly Recruit Youth, Human Rights Watch, 20 December 2010
- Volcanic Activity Nyamulagira OCHA Situation Report No. 1, OCHA, 26 February 2001
