= Rwimi =

- Map of Uganda showing the location of Rwimi
- Coordinates: 00°22′41″N 30°12′59″E
- District: Bunyangabu District
- Elevation: 1,100 m (3,600 ft)

Population (2020 Estimate)
  - Total: 18,600
- Time zone: UTC+3 (EAT)

Rwimi is a town in Bunyangabu District in the Western Region of Uganda. With an estimated population of 16,200 in 2020 it is the largest urban center in the district, but the district headquarters are located elsewhere; in Kibiito.

== Geography ==
The town sits on the border between Bunyangabu District and Kasese District to south, in the Rwenzori Mountains. It is approximately 32 kilometres (20 mi), by road, north of Kasese, on the Fort Portal–Kasese Highway. Rwimi is located about 45 kilometres (28 mi), south of Fort Portal, the largest city in the Toro sub-region. The coordinates of the town are 0°22'41.0"N, 30°12'59.0"E (Latitude:0.378056; Longitude:30.216389).

== Overview ==
During the 1990s, Rwimi, then still a trading centre, survived several attacks by the Allied Democratic Forces.

Since about 2018, Rwimi has undergone rapid expansion, including the construction of new commercial buildings. This followed the elevation of Bunyangabu County to district status in 2017.

== Population ==
In 2014, the national population census put the population of Rwimi at 16,256.

In 2015, Uganda Bureau of Statistics (UBOS) estimated the population of Rwimi at 16,500 people. In 2020, the population agency estimated the population of the town at 18,600 people, of whom 9,600 (51.6 percent) were males and 9,000 (48.4 percent) were females. UBOS calculated the annual population growth rate of the town's population, to average 2.42 percent between 2015 and 2020.

== Points of interest ==
The following points of interest lie within the town or near its edges:

1. The offices of Rwimi Town Council

2. Rwimi Central Market

3. Rwimi Power Station

4. The Fort Portal-Kasese-Mpondwe Road passes through the town in a general north to south configuration.

== See also ==
- Toro Kingdom
- List of cities and towns in Uganda
