= Parishes of Kyenjojo =

Nyamanga is the community found in Kyenjojo District. It is one of the nine parishes and a village in Bufunjo Sub-county. Kyenjojo District is found in Mid - Western Uganda and in Toro Kingdom which is one of the known kingdoms in Uganda. The other kingdoms are Buganda, Bunyoro and Busoga. In this community there are a number of tribes living together with majority being the Batooro but other tribes such as Bakiga, Banyankore and Bafumbira started coming to this community as early as the 1980s and since then have become bona fide members of this community. The major language spoken is Rutooro for the Batooro and most of the other tribes speak it. Others include Runyankore-Rukiga and Rufumbira for the rest of the tribes. Almost everyone in this community understands Rutooro since it is the main language used.

== People ==
Socially, the people who live in this community are organised in small units under their clans. This implies that you find a hill occupied by one clan and another hill by another clan but with development trading centres are emerging and now many people have buildings in those trading centres where they sell local produce and get access to other family needs such as soap, salt, paraffin, sugar among others. Today the major sources of income for this community is selling of maize and ground nuts. The community has for long been a food basket for the sub-county as it produces over 95% of foods consumed by the households. Its only a few foods like Rice which are brought to the community as this is not a local food crop nor is it grown locally.

The majority of the community members have high levels of poverty and if one uses the World Bank definition of a poor person as one who spends less than a dollar a day, over 98% of the population in this community live below the poverty line and they depend on subsistence agriculture growing mainly cassava, sweet potatoes, beans, millet, sorghum and maize which is both a food crop and cash crop at the same time since it has replaced coffee which used to be the major cash crop of the people in this community. The people lost their coffee to coffee wilt which is a disease that would dry up all coffee trees and thus there was nothing to harvest and people resorted to the growing of maize which is sold to the traders at a very low price because the farmers are poor and cannot wait for the prices to go up and end up being exploited. High levels of poverty are also evidenced by the fact that 60% of the sub-county still sleep in grass thatched houses because they cannot afford iron sheets and according to 2002 Population and Housing Census report, 99% use firewood and charcoal for cooking as their main source of energy for both cooking and lighting.

The community is found in Bufunjo sub-county which is the farthest and most rural sub-county of Kyenjojo District and thus service delivery is at its lowest1 . Literacy levels are still low rated at 65% compared to the national of 73%1, and this limits demand for better service delivery by the rights holders from the duty bearers, the community is having a problem of lack of access to information regionally, nationally and international. This is confirmed by the Census Report of 2002 that 68% of the population depends on the word of mouth as their major source of information.

In this community, there are a number of social services provided such as schools where there are two schools one Kagoma Primary School and Bufunjo Secondary School which are all government aided schools and are considered the best in the sub-county. The sub-county headquarters are found in this community, there is a market, a big trading centre called Kifuka, a number of places of worship that is for the Catholics, Protestants, Muslims, Shrines and others. In the same community there is also a Health Centre III which serves the entire sub-county.

In spite of the fact that there are schools in this community, the rate of school dropout is the highest in the district as report by the district in 2010. No access to clean water as people fetch water from spring wells some of them are not even protected, tribal conflicts, rumor mongering, witchcraft, lack of capacity to access basic needs of life, being not informed about current events all of which characterize this community.

Given its remoteness, there are not many non-governmental organisations working in this area and to be precise it is like either a forgotten or neglected community because it lacks substantive representation at the district and nobody cares about this area. This is partly as a result of the fact that the whole sub-county has 75% immigrants and only 25% the native Batooro and the community is in Toro Kingdom and consequently the other leaders at the district feel there is not much need to offer services in this sub-county. The immigrants came from Ankole and Kigezi Kingdoms of South Western Uganda because there the population over increased and thus some people migrated in search of agricultural land in Toro Kingdom and specifically Mwenge North where my community is found. However, with the establishment of the Organisation of Rural Poverty Eradication (ORUPERA - An organisation I work with) people are gradually being brought together, sensitized to love one another as Ugandans, encouraged to collectively work as a team in order to fight a common enemy- poverty resulting from unemployment, low levels of literacy and the dependence on subsistence farming.
