= Rwimi Hydroelectric Power Station =

- Map of Uganda showing the location of Rwimi
- Country: Uganda
- Location: Rwimi, Bunyangabu District
- Coordinates: 00°23′10″N 30°11′07″E
- Status: Operational

Dam and spillways
- Impounds: Rwimi River

Reservoir
- Normal elevation: 1,200 m (3,900 ft)

Power Station
- Commission date: October 2017
- Type: Run-of-the-river
- Turbines: 2
- Installed capacity: 5.54 MW (7,430 hp)

Rwimi Hydroelectric Power Station, also Rwimi Power Station, is an operational 5.54 megawatts (7,430 hp) hydroelectric power station in the Western Region of Uganda.

== Location ==
The power station is located on the Rwimi River, along the border between Kasese District and Bunyangabu District. This location lies near the town of Rwimi in Bunyangabu District, approximately 34 kilometres (21 mi), north of Kasese along the Fort Portal-Kasese-Mpondwe Road.

This location lies approximately 47 kilometres (29 mi), by road, south of Fort Portal, the largest town in the sub-region. The coordinates of Rwimi Hydroelectric Power Station are:0°23'10.0"N, 30°11'07.0"E (Latitude:0.386111; Longitude:30.185278).

== Overview ==
Rwimi Hydropower Station is a mini-hydropower plant, with capacity installation of 5.54 megawatts (7,430 hp). Eco Power (Private) Limited, the single largest power company in Sri Lanka, through its Ugandan subsidiary, Eco Power Uganda Limited was awarded the development rights to the project.

== Construction costs ==
The construction costs were budgeted at US$21.1 million (initially US$20.9 million). Of that, the Belgian Investment Company for Developing Countries (BIO), is lending US$13 million, Norfund is lending US$4.2 million (NOK:33.4 million), and GETFit Uganda is providing US$3.9 million through KfW.

== Construction timeline ==
In October 2014, the Electricity Regulatory Authority (ERA), licensed nine new renewable energy projects. One of those nine, is Rwimi Power Station. Construction was expected to begin in December 2014 and last approximately 24 months. Construction began in July 2015, with a new date of starting commercial operations in the second half of 2017.

== See also ==
- Africa Dams
- Uganda Power Stations
