= Kagadi District =

- District
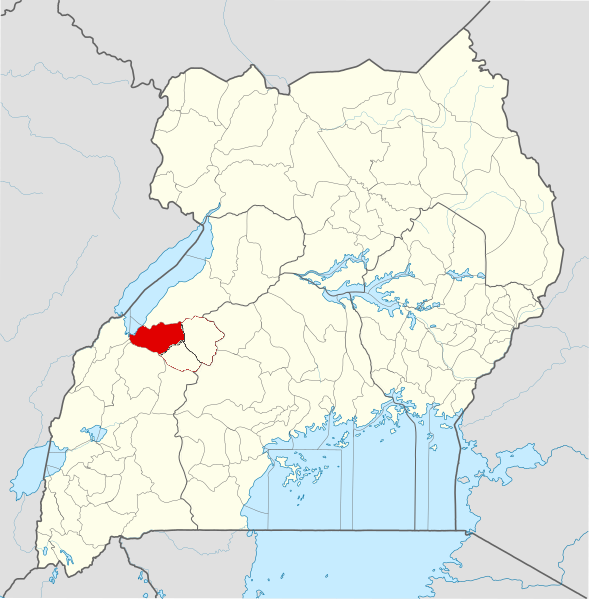
- Interactive map of Kagadi District
- Coordinates: 00°56′N 30°49′E
- Country: Uganda
- Region: Western Region
- Sub-region: Bunyoro sub-region
- Capital: Kagadi
- Elevation: 1,350 m (4,430 ft)
- Time zone: UTC+3 (EAT)
- Website: www.kagadi.go.ug

Kagadi District is a district in the Western Region of Uganda.

== Location ==
The district is bordered by Ntoroko District to the west, Hoima District to the north, Kibaale District to the east, and Kyenjojo District to the south. The town of Kagadi, where the district headquarters are located, is approximately 250 kilometres (155 mi) north-west of Kampala, the capital city of Uganda. This is about 92 kilometres (57 mi) south-west of Hoima, the nearest large city.

This district has over two county namely:

=== Buyaga East County ===
This county is further divided into 16 sub counties and they include:

1. Isunga
2. Kabamba
3. Kagadi
4. Kagadi Town Council
5. Kamuroza
6. Kicucura
7. Kinyarugonjo
8. Kiryanga
9. Kyanaisoke
10. Kyenzige
11. Kyenzige Town Council
12. Mabaale
13. Mabaale Town Council
14. Nyabutanzi
15. Pachwa
16. Pachwa town Council

=== Buyaga West county ===
The 19 sub counties under Buyaga west county include.

1. Buhumuliro
2. Burora
3. Bwikara
4. Galiboleka
5. Kanyabeebe
6. Kyakabadiima
7. Kyaterekera
8. Kyaterekera Town Council
9. Mairirwe
10. Mpeefu
11. Mpeefu Ya Sande Town Council
12. Muhorro
13. Muhorro Town Council
14. Ndaiga
15. Nyakarongo
16. Rugashari
17. Rugashari Town Council
18. Ruteete
19. Ruteete Town Council

== Population ==
The estimated population of Kagadi District was 351,033 from 2014, and in 2024 the estimated population was 471,111 .

== Overview ==
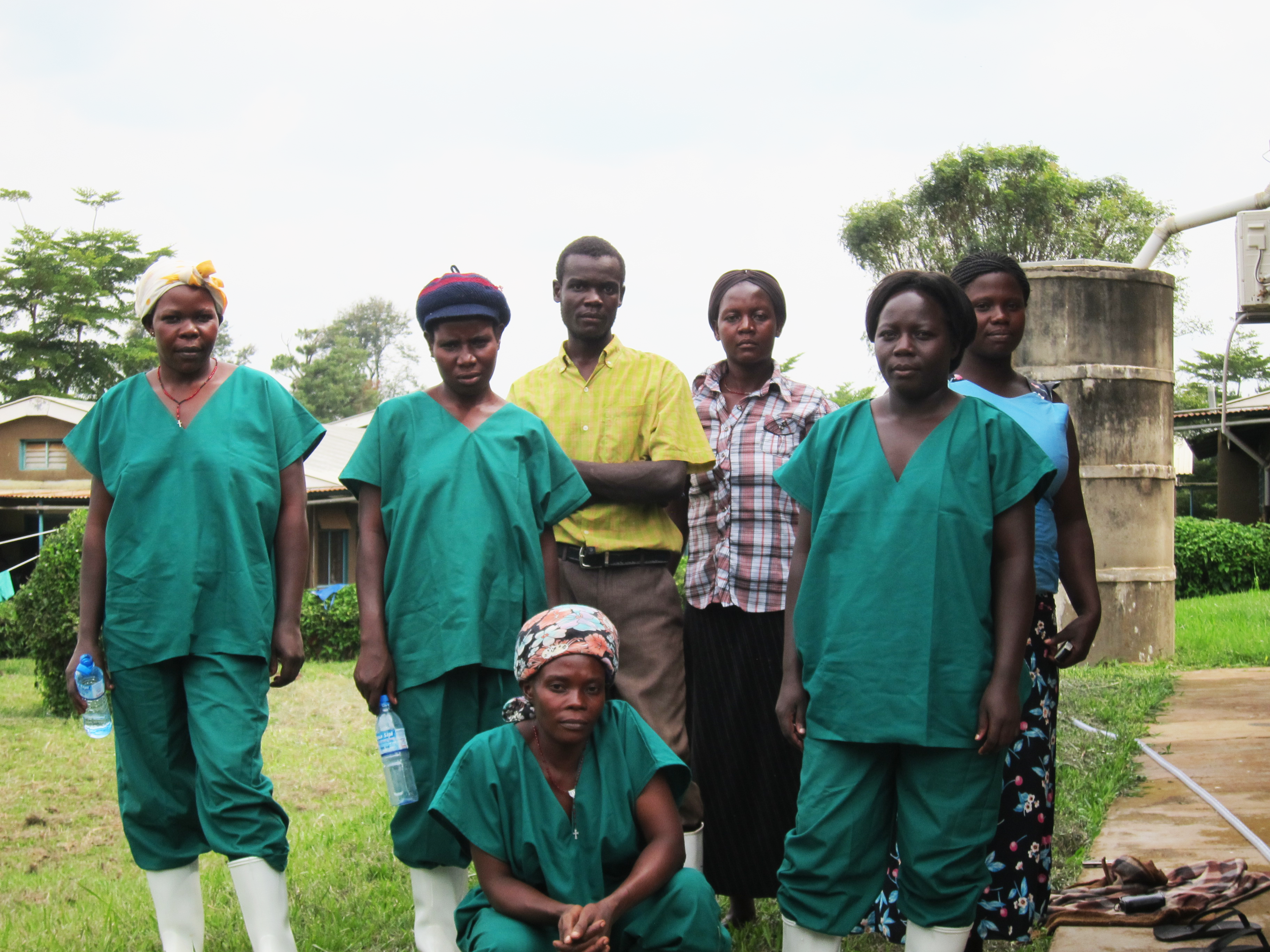
staff of Kagadi General hospital during Ebola Outbreak in summer

The district was created on 1 July 2012 when Kibaale District was subdivided to create the current Kagadi, Kakumiro, and Kibaale districts. The district administration began to function on 1 July 2016.

== See also ==
- Parliament of Uganda
- Districts of Uganda
- Western Region, Uganda
- Bunyoro sub-region
