= Kakumiro District =

- District
- Location within Uganda
- Coordinates: 00°47′N 31°20′E
- Country: Uganda
- Region: Western Region
- Sub-region: Bunyoro sub-region
- Capital: Kakumiro
- Elevation: 1,300 m (4,300 ft)

Population (2017 Estimate)
  - Total: 300,000
- Time zone: UTC+3 (EAT)
- Website: www.kakumiro.go.ug

Kakumiro District is a district in the Western Region of Uganda.

== Location ==
The districts surrounding Kakumiro District include Hoima District to the north, Kyegegwa District to the north-east, Kiboga District to the east, Mubende District to the south-east, Kyegegwa District to the south, and Kibaale District to the west. The town of Kakumiro, the location of the district headquarters, is approximately 182 kilometres (113 mi), by road, north-west of Kampala, Uganda's capital city. This location is approximately 80 kilometres (50 mi), by road, south of Hoima, the nearest large town.

Kakumiro District is divided into small administrative units and these include Counties and Sub counties.

=== Bugangaizi East County. ===
The sub counties and Town councils include.

1. Katikara
2. Kibijjo
3. Kisiita
4. Kisiita Town Council
5. Mpasaana
6. Mpasaana Town Council
7. Mwitanzige
8. Nkooko
9. Nkooko Town Council

=== Bugangaizi South County. ===
Bugangaizi South County has over five sub counties and two Town councils include.

1. Birembo
2. Bwanswa
3. Igayaza Town Council
4. Kakumiro Town Council
5. Kasambya
6. Kisengwe
7. Kyabasaija

=== Bugangaizi West County. ===
List of sub county and town council include:

1. Kakindo
2. Kakindo Town Council
3. Kijangi
4. Kikoora
5. Kikwaya
6. Kitaihuka
7. Nalweyo
8. Nalweyo Town Council

== Overview ==
The district was created by the government of Uganda, effective 1 July 2016, when Kibaale District was split into three creating the current districts of Kagadi, Kakumiro and Kibaale.

== Population ==
In July 2017, the population of Kakumiro District was estimated at approximately 300,000 people.however, by the 2014 national census, the district’s population had increased to 293,108. and by the 2024 national census, the district’s population had increased to 428,176, distributed across three counties. Bugangaizi East (156,609), Bugangaizi West (148,230), and Bugangaizi South (123,337).

== Economic Activities ==
Agriculture is the backbone of Kakumiro District’s economy, with the majority of the population engaged in farming and related activities. The main cash crop is coffee, but other crops are also cultivated for income and food security. Crops grown include:

- Bananas (Matooke/Plantain): A major staple crop, grown for both food security and income, often cultivated alongside coffee in the 4‑acre model farms.
- Maize: Cultivated extensively as a staple food and as a commercial crop.
- Beans: A primary pulse grown for household consumption and income generation.
- Vanilla: Increasingly grown by smallholder farmers as a high‑value cash crop.
- Onions: Promoted as part of the 4‑acre model for agricultural diversification.
- Cocoa: Cultivated within the district in small quantities.
- Cassava: Grown for both subsistence and local markets.

Important fruit crops include pineapples and passion fruit.

Livestock in the district include;

- Cattle
- Pigs
- Poultry
- Goats
- Sheep

== See also ==
1. Parliament of Uganda
2. Western Region, Uganda
3. Districts of Uganda
