= Kyenjojo =

Kyenjojo Kyenjojo Municipality
- Green-filled Kyenjojo-Fort Portal Road

- Location in Uganda
- Coordinates: 00°36′36″N 30°38′39″E
- Country: Uganda
- Region: Western Region of Uganda
- Sub-region: Toro sub-region
- District: Kyenjojo District
- Elevation: 4,600 ft (1,400 m)

Population (2024 Census)
  - Total: 35,014

Kyenjojo is a town in the Western Region of Uganda. It is the main municipal, administrative, and commercial center of Kyenjojo District and the site of the district headquarters.

== Location ==
Kyenjojo is at the intersection of two major highways. The Kyenjojo–Kabwoya Road makes a T-junction with the Mubende–Fort Portal Road in the middle of town. The town is approximately 51 kilometres (32 mi), by road, east of Fort Portal, the largest city in the Toro sub-region. This is approximately 245 kilometres (152 mi), by road, west of Kampala, Uganda's capital and largest city. The coordinates of the town are 0°36'36.0"N, 30°38'39.0"E (Latitude:0.6100; Longitude:30.6442).

== Population ==
In 2002, the national census estimated the population of the town at 15,040. In 2010, the Uganda Bureau of Statistics (UBOS) estimated the population at 20,100. In 2011, UBOS estimated the population at 20,900. On 27 August 2014, the national population census put the population at 23,467.

In 2015, the town's population was projected at 23,700. In 2020, the mid-year population of Kyenjojo Town Council was projected at 28,600. It was calculated that the population of the town increased at an average annual rate of 3.8 percent, between 2015 and 2020.

Historical population
Year	Pop.	±%
2002	15,040	—
2010	20,100	+33.6%
2011	20,900	+4.0%
2014	23,467	+12.3%
2015	23,700	+1.0%
2020	28,600	+20.7%

== Points of interest ==
The following additional points of interest are within the town limits or close to the edges of town: the offices of Kyenjojo Town Council, the offices of Kyenjojo District Local Government, Kyenjojo central market, Kyenjojo General Hospital, a public hospital administered by the Uganda Ministry of Health and a mobile Branch of PostBank Uganda. Opportunity Bank Uganda and Centenary Bank also maintain branches in the town.

== See also ==
- Toro Kingdom
- List of cities and towns in Uganda
