= Rubona, Rwanda =

Rubona
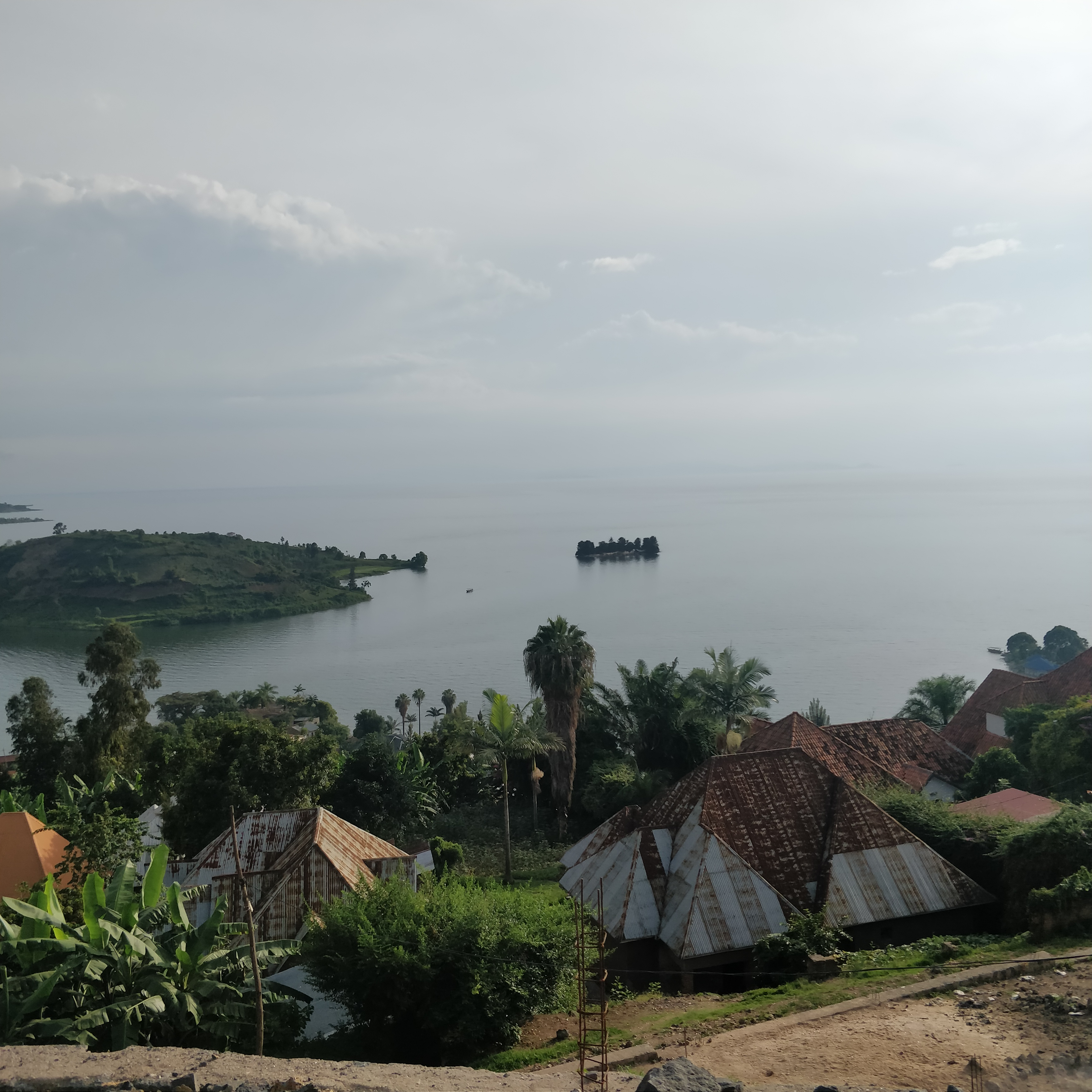
- A view of Lake Kivu from Rubona

- Location in Rwanda
- Coordinates: 01°43′42″S 29°15′22″E
- Country: Rwanda
- Admin. division: Western Province
- District: Rubavu

Rubona, also Rubona Peninsula, is a neighborhood to the south of the city of Gisenyi in Rwanda.

== Location ==
The neighborhood is on the Lake Kivu lake-shore, about 4 kilometres (2 mi), south of the central business district of Gisenyi, Rubavu District, in the Western Province of Rwanda. The coordinates of Rubona are:01°43'42.0"S, 29°15'22.0"E (Latitude:-1.728333; Longitude:29.256111).

== Overview ==
The steep hills in Rubona are populated by small homesteads with surrounding gardens. The lake shore is rocky, in most areas, with occasional sandy spots and places suitable for swimming. It attracts many visitors on weekends. Rubona is also the location of natural hot springs, which are used for boiling potatoes and are reported to cure a variety of ailments.

The frontiers of the Congo Free State were defined by the Neutrality Act during the 1885 Berlin Conference, in which the European powers staked out their territorial claims in Africa. This placed all of Lake Kivu in the Free State. In June 1909 John Methuen Coote started the Kivu frontier incident when he travelled southwest from the British colony of Uganda and established fortified camps at Burungu and Rubona (Lubuna). British troops under Coote withdrew from the Rubona post on 29 June 1909, and the Belgians occupied the post. After a series of incidents the boundaries of the Congo, Uganda and Rwanda were settled in May 1910, with Rubona assigned to the German colony of Rwanda.

== Sources ==
- Lederer, André (1993), "Incident de frontière au Kivu", Civilisations (in French), 41, doi:10.4000/civilisations.1730
- Rutanga, Murindwa (2011), Politics, Religion, and Power in the Great Lakes Region, African Books Collective, ISBN 978-2-86978-492-5
