= Kagadi =

- Location in Uganda
- Coordinates: 00°56′28″N 30°48′39″E
- Country: Uganda
- Region: Western Region
- Sub-region: Bunyoro sub-region
- District: Kagadi District
- Elevation: 3,870 ft (1,180 m)

Population (2024 Census)
  - Total: 31,602

Kagadi is a town in the Western Region of Uganda. It is the commercial and administrative headquarters of Kagadi District.

== Location ==
Kagadi is in Buyaga East County, approximately 95 kilometres (59 mi) south-west of Hoima, the largest town in the Bunyoro sub-region. This is approximately 245 kilometres (152 mi), by road, west of Kampala, Uganda's capital and largest city. The coordinates of the town are 0°56'28.0"N, 30°48'39.0"E (Latitude:0.941111; Longitude: 30.810833).

== Population ==
The 2002 national population census put the population of Kagadi at 13,568. In 2010, the Uganda Bureau of Statistics (UBOS) estimated the population at 20,600. In 2011, UBOS estimated the mid-year population at 21,600. In 2014, the national census put the population at 22,813.

== Points of interest ==
The following points of interest lie within or close to the town limits:

- Offices of Kagadi District local government
- Offices of Kagadi Town Council
- Kagadi Hospital, a 120-bed public hospital administered by the Uganda Ministry of Health
- Mubende–Kakumiro–Kibaale–Kagadi Road joins the Kyenjojo–Kabwoya Road in the middle of town.
- Kagadi central market
- Hoima-Fort Portal highway, passing through the eastern suburbs of the town
- African Rural University
- kiraba Rock Hill
- St. Ambrose Charity health centre iv
- St Ambrose institute of health sciences
- Paradigm Institute of Business and Media Studies
- Kagadi Rocks
- Emeline Hotel
- URDT
- Kagadi Catholic church

== See also ==
- Bwamiramira
- Kakumiro
- Kibaale
- List of cities and towns in Uganda
