= Kakumiro =

- Location in Uganda
- Coordinates: 00°46′52″N 31°19′23″E
- Country: Uganda
- Region: Western Region
- Sub-region: Bunyoro sub-region
- District: Kakumiro District
- Elevation: 4,300 ft (1,300 m)

Kakumiro is a town in the Western Region of Uganda. It is the main municipal, administrative, and commercial center of Kakumiro District, and the district headquarters are located there.

== Location ==
Kakumiro, in Bwanswa sub-county, is approximately 182 kilometres (113 mi) north-west of Kampala, the country's capital city. Kakumiro also is approximately 80 kilometres (50 mi) south of Hoima, the nearest large town. The geographical coordinates of the town are 0°46'52.0"N, 31°19'23.0"E (Latitude:0.781111; Longitude:31.323056).

== Points of interest ==
Kakumiro has the following points of interest. Firstly, the Kakumiro Health Centre IV. This facility is administered by the Kakumirio District local government, whose leaders advocate for its elevation to hospital status. Secondly, the Mubende–Kakumiro–Kibaale–Kagadi Road, which passes through the middle of town in a general east-to-west direction.

== See also ==
- Kibaale
- Kagadi
- Bunyoro sub-region
