= Kivu frontier incident =

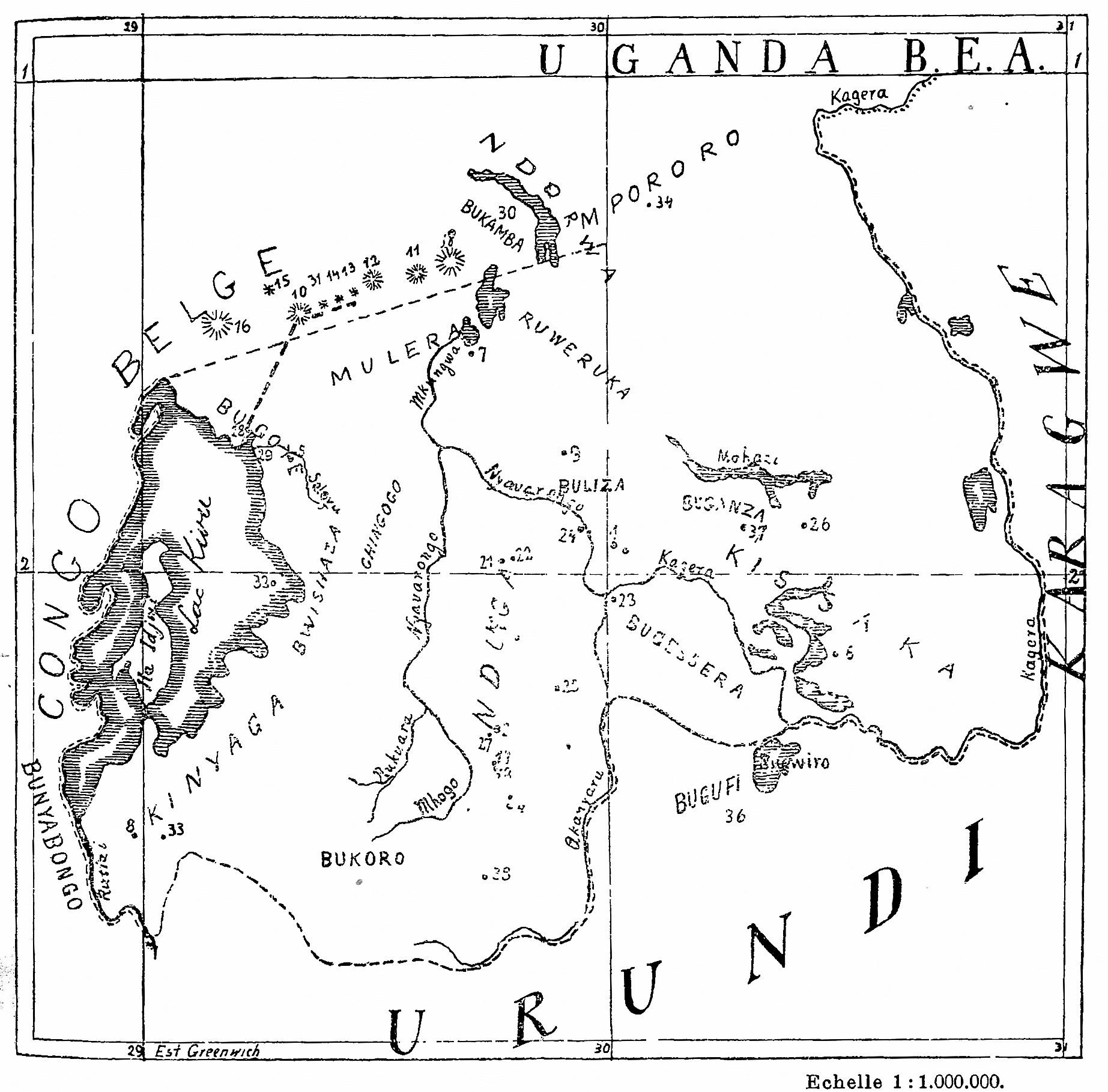
1912 map of Ruanda. Alternate borders shown north of Lake Kivu in the west

The Kivu frontier incident was a 1909–1910 stand-off between Belgian, British and German forces in the region around Lake Kivu, now divided between the Democratic Republic of the Congo, Uganda and Rwanda. War was averted through diplomatic negotiations, and it was agreed that the western and northwestern part of the region came within the jurisdiction of the Belgian Congo, while the eastern part was divided between the British Uganda Protectorate to the northeast and the Rwanda district of German East Africa to the southeast.

== Background ==
1885 Boundary points. Straight lines connected points A, B and C

The frontiers of the Congo Free State were defined by the Neutrality Act during the 1885 Berlin Conference, in which the European powers staked out their territorial claims in Africa. However, the northeastern part of the Free State had not been explored or mapped by Europeans at this time, and Lake Kivu was not to be discovered until nine years later, by Count Gustav Adolf von Götzen in 1894. The northeastern boundary in 1885 was defined as "a straight line coming from the northern end of Lake Tanganyika and ending at a point located on the 30th east meridian and at 1° 20' south latitude; further north, the border is formed by the 30th meridian east." On this basis, Lake Kivu and both sides of the Ruzizi River were in the Free State. (Note: Lake Kivu is in the Albertine Rift between Lake Edward to the north and Lake Tanganyika to the south. The Ruzizi River flows southeast from Lake Kivu and then south to Lake Tanganyika. The Ufumbiro plain lies between Lake Kivu and Lake Edward. Lake Edward drains to the north via the Semliki River into Lake Albert, which in turn drains into the Nile.)

Leopold II of Belgium recognized the area of British influence described in the 27 July 1890 Anglo-German agreement. On 12 May 1894 the Uganda Protectorate and Congo Free State agreed on their border. Britain leased the Lado Enclave to the Congo Free State, giving access to the Nile, and in exchange the Free State leased Britain a strip 25 kilometres (16 mi) wide from Lake Tanganyika to Lake Edward, which would allow them to build a railway from Cape Town to Cairo (using a boat to carry passengers north from Rhodesia via Lake Tanganyika). The Congo–Uganda boundary was confirmed by the Anglo-Congolese Commission of 1907–08.

In 1896 the mutiny in the northeast of the Congo during the Congo-Nile expedition of Francis Dhanis forced the Belgians to evacuate the territory between the official border and the Ruzizi valley and Lake Kivu. The Germans established a presence in this region during the power vacuum that resulted. When the Belgians tried to reoccupy this territory in October 1899 the Germans were reluctant to leave. There were constant incidents in the region with the Germans.

On 10 April 1900 Auguste Beernaert for Belgium and Frédéric Jean d'Alvensleben for Germany signed a protocol defining the frontier between their territories. Commander Paul Costermans sent Frederik-Valdemar Olsen to found a post in July 1900 on Lake Kivu, which later became Bukavu. Lieutenant Paul Léon Delwart, head of the elite company of the Force Publique in Orientale Province, died on 19 August 1900. Frederik-Valdemar Olsen replaced Delwart as leader of the elite Belgian company in the Ruzizi-Kivu region.

== Renewed British claims ==
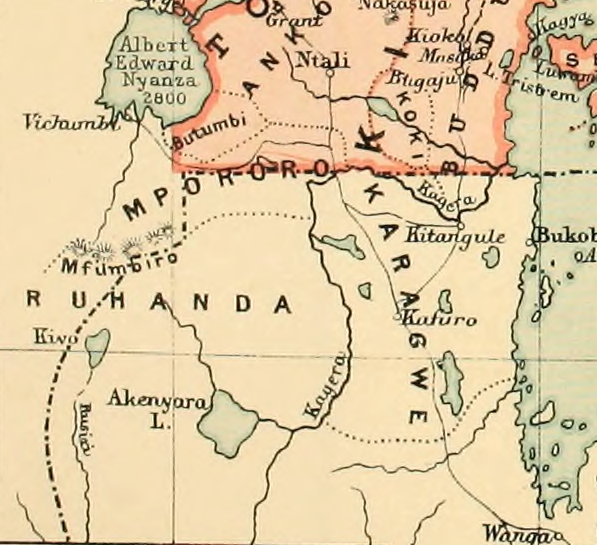
Uganda and Rwanda (1898) showing Mufumbiro mts between Lakes Albert and Kivu. Lake Kivu is in fact much larger. (Note: The 1898 map is highly inaccurate. A.H. Keane in his Africa (1895) wrote, "The Lake Akenyara Alexandra Nyanza spoken of both by Speke and Stanley as traversed by the Kagera, appears to have no existence.")

In February 1907 Britain claimed the Mount Mufumbiro (Virunga Mountains) territory. Belgium pointed out that this was not consistent with former agreements over the boundaries between Uganda Protectorate and the Congo Free State, but on 10 October 1908 England renewed its claim in a letter to Chevalier de Cuvelier, secretary general of the state department of Congo, stating it intended to annex the territory.

The Anglo-German Agreement of 19 May 1909 defined the boundary between the northwest of German East Africa and Uganda. It claimed to be based on agreements in 1884 and 1890 in which Germany ceded part of Mfumbiro region to the British in return for Britain promising to make no further claims. The Germans agreed with the British that the whole Kilimanjaro massif would be in German East Africa, while in exchange the British would receive the Ufumbiro. According to the Germans this did not refer to the Mfumbiro Mountains but to the plain of Ufumbiro to the north of Lake Kivu. Von Schoen of Belgium wrote to Baron Greindl on 30 July 1909 protesting against this agreement, which dividing Belgian territory between Britain and Germany.

== Ufumbiro incident ==
Rwanda today. The western part of Rwanda was in Belgian territory under the 1885 agreement. The 1885 boundary point at 30°E, 1° 20'S is just SE of Lake Bunyonyi.

In December 1908 John Methuen Coote returned to Uganda from leave in Europe and was again posted to the Bukedi District. Almost as soon as he arrived the District Commissioner, Sydney Ormsby, died. Coote took over as District Commissioner at Mbale. At the end of May 1909 a runner brought Coote orders to report to Entebbe. There he was told to go to Mbarara and there take charge of a mixed force of Sikhs, King's African Rifles and Police as Political Officer. With this force he was to establish a post on Lake Kivu and to administer the surrounding district. Coote did not waste time. He left Entebbe on 7 June and the expedition left Mbarara on 11 June 1908.

Coote entered the Belgian territory through a band of territory that a German map showed to belong to the British. It would give them direct access to Lake Kivu without crossing Belgian territory. He advanced quickly in night stages and reached the shore of Lake Kivu near Goma. The local chiefs did not recognize Belgian authority south of Rutshuru and did not report the British movement to the Belgians. Coote established fortified camps at Burungu and Rubona (Lubuna). On 26 June 1909 Coote, as district commissioner of Mbarara, wrote from Mount Lubuna to F. Goffoel, head of the Rutshuru sector, stating that he had been instructed to occupy the Ufumbiro. From now on, north of 1° 20' south latitude the border was longer formed by the 30° east meridian, but instead by the 29° 47' east meridian. Rutshuru was therefore part of the Mbarara district. Coote invited Olsen to meet him in Rubona to conclude an agreement pending a decision by the governments.

When Goffoel received Coote's letter he replied that he was not authorized to deal with the question and referred it to Olsen, who was on an inspection tour in the Kasindi region to the north of Lake Edward. He sent 100 men under Captain Wangermée and Lieutenant Brochard to confirm reports that two Europeans and 50 men were at a point three hours walk southeast of Rutshuru. Wangermée met Coote near Bayanza, and delivered Goffoel's message. He urged Coote not to advance further. The two men then had a friendly conversation, and Coote gained the impression that his present position was recognized by the Belgians as being in the British zone. British troops under Coote withdrew from the Rubona post on 29 June 1909, and the Belgians occupied the post. Coote complained of the Belgian action in a letter of 2 July 1909, and Olsen replied on 12 July 1909.

== Belgian response ==
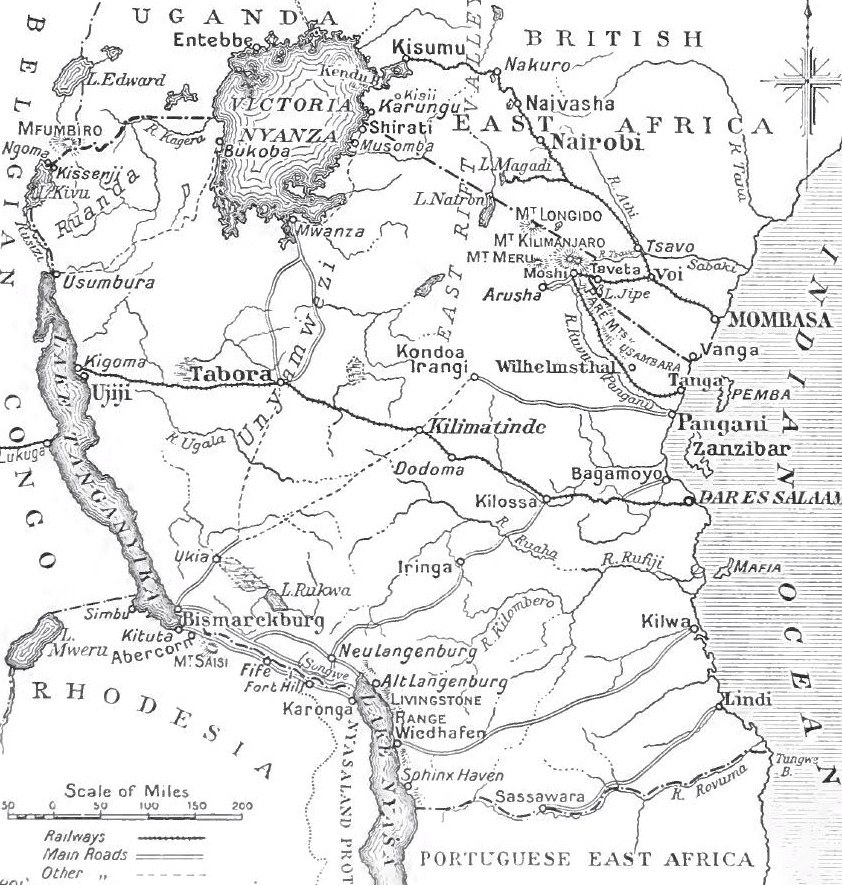
German East Africa (1914)

Olsen received Coote's first letter claiming the Ufumbiro plain on 1 July 1909. He immediately dispatched a telegram to the Belgian government from Fort Portal, Uganda, stating that the British had violated Belgian territory and that he was heading to the English camp in Ufumbiro and would use all means including armed force to ensure that the English would respect the Belgian border. On 2 July 1909 Olsen sent Coote a letter protesting Coote's letter, which he said contradicted the April 1904 agreement of the joint Anglo-Congolese commission. If the English really intended to occupy the Ufumbiro they should have notified the Belgian government. Olsen refused to meet Coote in Belgian territory, and insisted the matter be decided by the Belgian and British governments. Olsen was in the stronger position, since his troops were supplied by villages in Belgian territory, while Coote was halted in the marshy region between the Mutanda, Bunyonyi and Burera lakes. Coote had eight officers, 350 men and two guns. He could not attack, but would stubbornly defend his position.

In July and August 1909 there were a series of clashes between the Belgians and the English, and then between the Belgians and the Germans. Olsen arrested two British soldiers camped at Kurezi, and created three redoubts that blocked all access by the British. Coote decided to repossess Kurezi but was stopped in the marshy region and ran low of food. Olsen refused to meet Coote until he withdrew, which Coote would not do, and a stalemate ensued for ten months while the Belgian, German and British governments agreed on their respective borders in the region. At the same time Olsen had to deal with various provocations by the Germans in the volcano region to the north of Lake Kivu. The local people were aware of the disagreement between the colonial powers over how to divided up their territory. Mail was intercepted and destroyed, or in at least one case official mail to Coote was diverted to Olsen, who forwarded it to Coote unopened.

The Germans, concerned by the Belgian and British concentrations, occupied Mount Nyamuragira in the north of the disputed territory with a force of 300 men. Olsen deployed a force of 400 men with two cannons and a machine gun in Muhavuru facing the British, with another force of 400 men and two guns distributed between Bobandana and Rutshuru prepared to move against the Germans south of the volcanoes if needed. Olsen accused the British of various abuses of the local people in Belgian territory, and of stealing ivory. On 8 November 1909 Earl Granville wrote to the Belgian Minister of Foreign Affairs, Davignon, protesting the arrest of two British soldiers, a Muganda headman and five porters. Davignon replied by officially accusing the British of violence against the local people. He also said they had looted 30 head of cattle.

On 19 November 1909 Coote wrote to Acting Governor Boyle saying the Belgians were building a road from their ferry on Lake Kivu to Rutshuru. It was avoiding German territory by passing between Mount Nyamuragira and Mount Nyiragongo. On 26 November 1909 he reported that the Belgians had stopped working on the road and retired to the south of Lake Kivu due to pressure from the Germans. The road was to be routed to avoid Churuzi and pass round the northwest of Lake Kivu. In December 1909 Belgium had 2,000 troops in the region compared to 800 British soldiers, and the consul at Boma reported that more Belgians were being mobilized. On 29 January 1910 Olsen sent a telegraph reading,

Last warning to Commander of British troops. By numerous letters I have informed you that I consider any forward movement of your troops tantamount to an attack on our position. My force, being then in the position of lawful defense, will open fire from now, and you will take on yourself alone and entirely the heavy responsibility of the armed conflict which your are provoking.

== Resolution ==
A conference on the Anglo-German claims on the eastern frontier of the Congo began on 8 February 1910. Belgium was represented by Jules Van den Heuvel, Germany by Karl Ebermaier and Britain by Arthur Henry Hardinge. Belgium maintained the old claims communicated to Bismarck on 8 August 1884, and strongly objected to the Anglo-German agreement of May 1909. Germany stated that the British claim on Mfumbiro arose from the 12 May 1894 Anglo-Congolese agreement and the 1 July 1894 Anglo-German agreement. This claim had been adjusted in the 19 May 1909 Anglo-German agreement. The British pointed out that in the 1894 Anglo-Congolese convention the Congo recognized the British sphere of influence on Mount Ufumbiro, which Germany had ceded to Britain in 1890. The Belgian delegates pointed out that Ufumbiro was first a mountain, then a mountain range, and had then become a plain. Its location had never been stated precisely.

In the end, Britain as the stronger colonial power gained most. Germany also gained, and war was averted for three years. The Uganda-Congo Boundary Convention between Belgium and Britain was signed on 14 May 1910. An agreement between Britain and Germany was signed in Berlin on 26 August 1910. These agreements led to the 1911 Anglo-German-Belgian Boundary Commission. The boundaries that were eventually agreed were based on natural features and took no account of the local peoples, apart from allowing them to harvest their crops and then migrate with their flocks and possessions to the territory of the state that had previously administered their land.

== Sources ==
- Ayre, Peter (2018), "COOTE, John Methuen OBE", Europeans In East Africa
- Keane, Augustus Henry (1895), Africa, E. Stanford
- Lacroix, A. (1951), Biographie Coloniale Belge, vol. II, Inst. roy. colon. belge, pp. col. 271–272
- Lecocq, Hans-Joachim (2018), Le conflit frontalier germano-congolais de la Ruzizi-Kivu (1895-1910): disputée par l'Etat indépendant du Congo, héritée par la Belgique, gagnée par l'Allemagne (thesis) (in French), Prom.: Dujardin, Vincent; Gijs, Anne-Sophie., Faculté de philosophie, arts et lettres, Université catholique de Louvain, hdl:2078.1/thesis:14229
- Lederer, A. (1968), "OLSEN (Frederik Valdemar)", Biographie Belge d'Outre-Mer (in French), vol. VI, Académie Royale des Sciences d'Outre-Mer, pp. col. 783–790
- Lederer, André (1993), "Incident de frontière au Kivu", Civilisations (in French), 41 (41): 415–426, doi:10.4000/civilisations.1730
- Louis, William Roger (1963), Ruanda-Urundi, 1884-1919, Calrendon Press
- Rutanga, Murindwa (2011), Politics, Religion, and Power in the Great Lakes Region, African Books Collective, ISBN 978-2-86978-492-5
