= Kibaale =

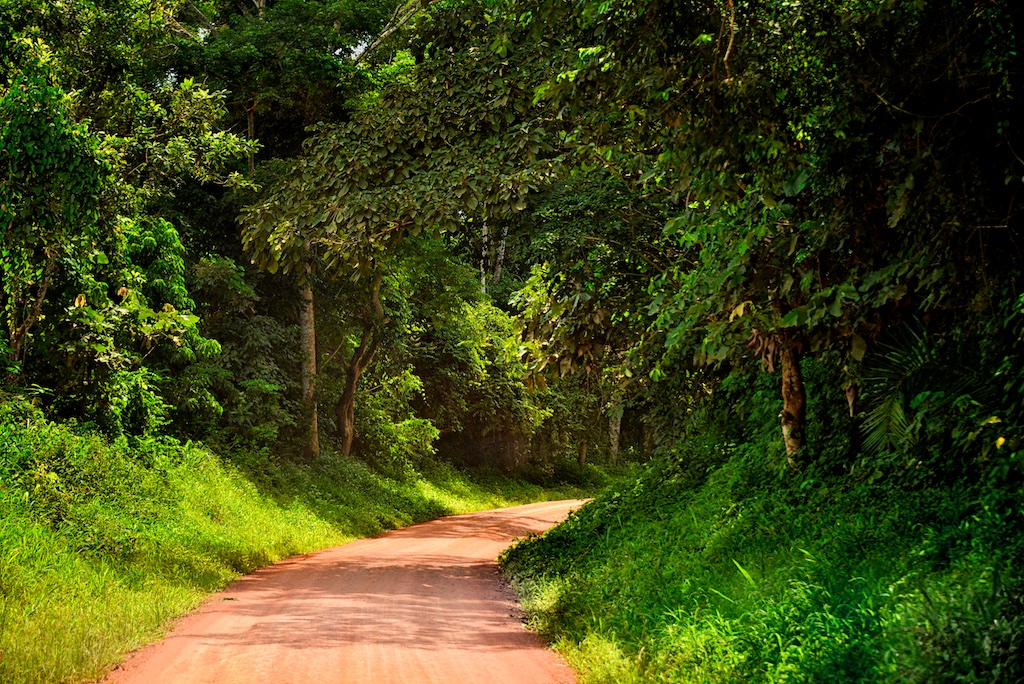

- Location in Uganda
- Coordinates: 00°47′28″N 31°04′30″E
- Country: Uganda
- Region: Western Uganda
- Sub-region: Bunyoro sub-region
- District: Kibaale District
- Elevation: 4,460 ft (1,360 m)

Population (2011 Estimate)
  - Total: 7,600

Kibaale is a town in the Western Region of Uganda. It is the main municipal, administrative, and commercial center of Kibaale District, and the district headquarters are located there.

== Location ==
Kibaale is in Buyaga County, approximately 220 kilometres (140 mi), by road, west of Kampala, Uganda's capital and largest city. This is approximately 98 kilometres (61 mi), southwest of Hoima, the nearest large town. The coordinates of the town are:0°47'28.0"N, 31°04'30.0"E (Latitude: 0.791100; Longitude: 31.075003).

== Population ==
The 2002 national census estimated the population of Kibaale at 4,800. In 2010, the population had grown to 7,200, as estimated by the Uganda Bureau of Statistics (UBOS). In 2011, UBOS estimated the population at 7,600.

== Points of interest ==
The following points of interest lie within the town limits or close to its edges:

- Headquarters of Kibaale District Administration
- Offices of Kibaale Town Council
- Kibaale central market
- Town of Bwamiramira, approximately 5 kilometres (3.1 mi), by road, west of Kibaale
- Mobile branch of PostBank Uganda

== See also ==
- Kagadi
- Bunyoro sub-region
- ICCF Holland
