= Adolf Mwesige =

Ugandan lawyer and politician

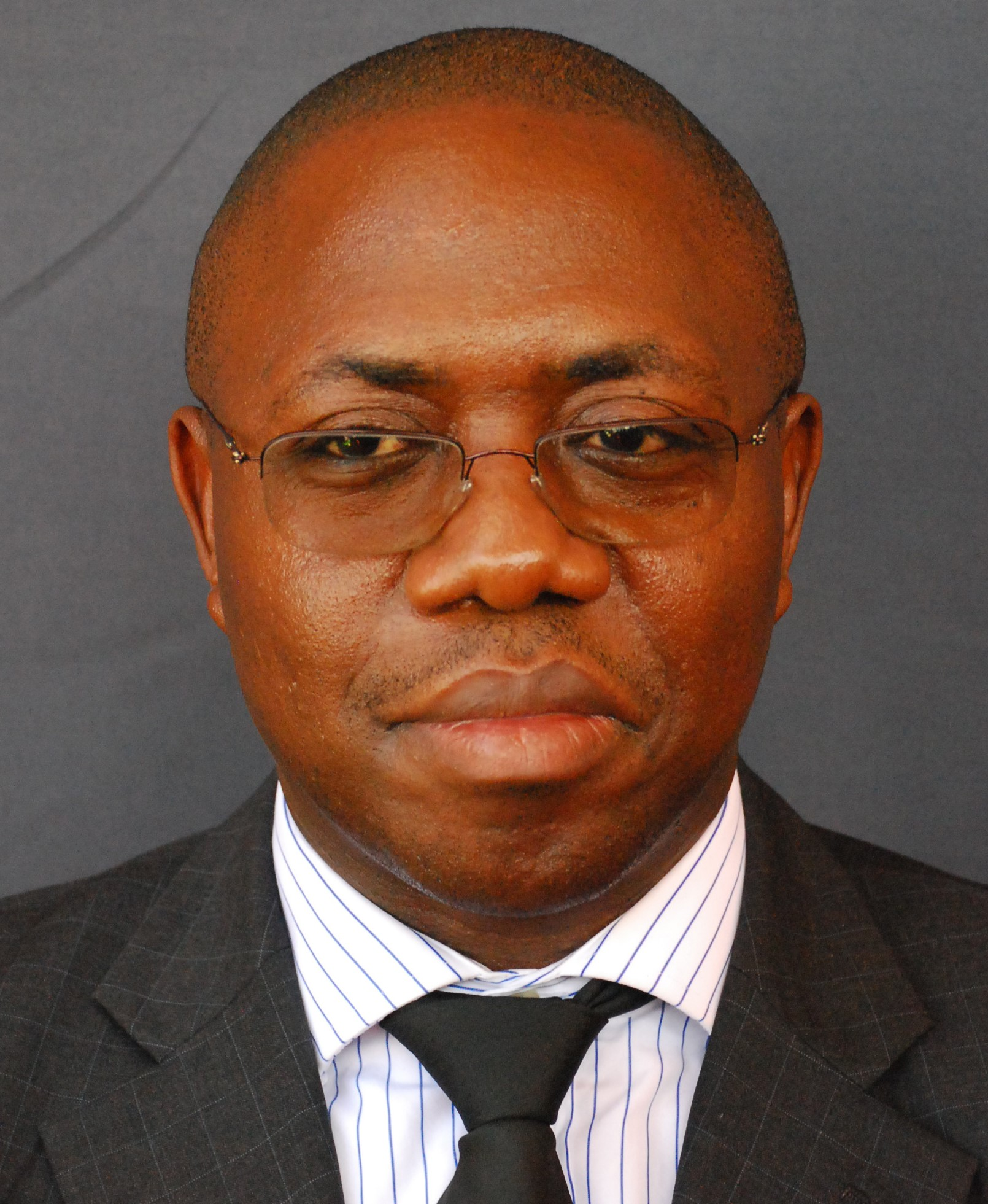
- Born: 4 April 1966 (age 60); Uganda
- Citizenship: Uganda
- Education: Makerere University, (Bachelor of Laws); Law Development Centre, (Diploma in Legal Practice); Public Administration Promotion Centre, Berlin in International Law); United Nations Centre for Human Rights, Geneva, (Diploma in Human Rights Law)
- Occupations: Lawyer, politician
- Years active: 1992-present
- Known for: Politics

Adolf Kasaija Mwesige (born 4 April 1966) is a Ugandan lawyer and politician who served as Minister of Defence and Veterans Affairs in the Cabinet of Uganda from 6 June 2016 to 8 June 2021. He previously served as Minister of Local Government from 18 February 2009 to 6 June 2016. He has also been the elected Member of Parliament for Bunyangabu County, Kabarole District, since 1996. In July 2017, Bunyangabu County was peeled off Kabarole District to form Bunyangabu District.

== Background and education ==
He attended Nyakasura School in Fort Portal for his A-Level education. Mwesige holds a Bachelor of Laws from Makerere University, Uganda's oldest university. He also holds a diploma in legal practice from the Law Development Centre in Kampala. He holds a diploma in international law from the Public Administration Promotion Center in Berlin, Germany and a diploma in human rights law from the United Nations Center for Human Rights in Geneva, Switzerland.

== Work experience ==
Mwesige has been enrolled as an Advocate of the High Court of Uganda since 1994. Between 1992 and 1996, he worked in the Ministry of Foreign Affairs, as a foreign service officer responsible for legal and consular matters. Between 1996 and 2001, he worked as the managing partner at Mwesige, Egunyu & Company Advocates, a Ugandan law firm.

He was first elected to Parliament in 1996, to represent Bunyangabu County in Kabarole District. Before 2009, Mwesige served as Minister for General Duties in the Office of the Prime Minister. He was appointed as Minister of Local Government on 18 February 2009. In the cabinet reshuffle of 27 May 2011, Mwesige retained his local government portfolio. He acted as vice-chair of the Commonwealth Local Government Forum from 2011 until he was moved to the post of Minister of Defense on 6 June 2016, replacing Crispus Kiyonga, who was dropped from the cabinet. He was replaced in this position by Vincent Ssempijja on 8 June 2021. Mwesige is the Clerk to Parliament since his appointment by the President got finalized in August 2021. In this role he replaced Jane Kibirige.

== 2026 parliamentary Corruption investigations ==
In May 2026, Mwesige came under public scrutiny during investigations into alleged corruption and financial irregularities at the Parliament of Uganda. Media reports stated that questions had been raised about his role as Clerk to Parliament, particularly because the Clerk serves as Parliament’s accounting officer and is responsible for authorising and accounting for expenditure.

Aringa South County Member of Parliament Yorke Odria Alioni called for investigations into Mwesige and other senior parliamentary officials, alleging irregularities in recruitment, financial transactions, and the management of parliamentary resources. The allegations had not resulted in any formal charge against Mwesige at the time of the reports.

On 19 May 2026, security officers and investigators reportedly sealed Mwesige’s office at Parliament as part of a wider search for documents and electronic records connected to the ongoing inquiry. Subsequent reports said a joint team of police investigators, the Inspectorate of Government and auditors spent several hours searching offices at Parliament, including the Clerk’s office, before leaving with materials for forensic review. Authorities had not publicly detailed Mwesigye’s specific role in the investigation, and no conviction or formal finding against him had been reported.

On 8 November 2026, president Yoweri Museveni dropped Mwesige from the position of Clerk to Parliament and nominated Edward Sengonzi Damulira to replace him in reshuffle of permanent secretaries.

== Family ==
Adolf Mwesige is a married father.

== See also ==
- Cabinet of Uganda
- Parliament of Uganda
