= Kibiito =

- Map of Uganda showing the location of Kibiito.
- Coordinates: 00°28′39″N 30°11′33″E
- Country: Uganda
- Region: Western Region of Uganda
- Sub-region: Toro sub-region
- District: Bunyangabu District

Population (2014 census)
  - Total: 12,984
- Time zone: UTC+3 (EAT)

Kibiito is a town in the Western Region of Uganda. It is the chief administrative center of Bunyangabu District, and the district headquarters are located there.

== Location ==
Kibiito is located along the Fort Portal–Kasese–Mpondwe Road, approximately 33 kilometres (21 mi), southwest of Fort Portal, the largest city in Toro sub-region. This is approximately 330 kilometres (205 mi), by road, west of Kampala, the national capital and largest city of Uganda. The geographical coordinates of Kibiito town are: 0°28'39.0"N, 30°11'33.0"E (Latitude:0.477500; Longitude:30.192500).

== Population ==
The national census and household survey conducted in August 2014, enumerated the population of Kibiito Town Council at 12,984

== Points of interest ==
The following points of interest are found in Kibiito or near its borders: (a) the headquarters of Bunyangabu District local government (b) the offices of Kibiito Town Council (c) Kiyimba central market (d) the Fort Portal–Kasese–Mpondwe Road passes through the middle of town in a general north to south direction (e) Kibiito Health Center.
