= Julius Kakeeto =

Ugandan accountant and corporate executive

- Born: Julius C. Kakeeto; 1976 (age 49–50); Nsambya Hospital, Kampala, Uganda
- Education: Strathmore University (BA); Manchester Business School (MBA); Association of Chartered Certified Accountants (FCCA); Institute of Certified Public Accountants of Uganda (CPA)
- Occupations: Accountant, businessman, & bank executive
- Years active: 1998–present
- Title: Managing director & Chief executive officer PostBank Uganda

Julius Kakeeto is a Ugandan accountant, businessman, and bank executive. He has been the managing director and chief executive officer of PostBank Uganda since November 2019. Before that, from 2015 until 2019, he was the managing director and CEO of Orient Bank, a Ugandan commercial bank.

== Background and education ==
Julius Kakeeto was born at St. Francis Hospital Nsambya in Kampala, Uganda to Engineer Hillary Kakeeto a civil servant and Maria Goretti Kakeeto. He attended St. Mary's College Kisubi before entering Strathmore University, in Nairobi, Kenya, where he obtained his ACCA. He holds a Master of Business Administration, from Manchester Business School, in the United Kingdom. He is a Fellow of the Association of Chartered Certified Accountants (FCCA) of the United Kingdom. He is also a member of the Institute of Certified Public Accountants of Uganda (ICPAU). He is a graduate of Harvard Business School, AMP Class 206.

== Career ==
Kakeeto worked with Ernst & Young from 1998 to 2000. He joined Citibank Uganda in 2000 rising to the role of Chief Financial Officer in the new subsidiary. Following that, he worked at the headquarters of Citibank's Africa Division in Johannesburg, South Africa. He then transferred to Citibank's offices in London initially in the Strategy and Planning team before transferring to the Investment Banking Division where he worked as a Vice President focusing on Emerging Markets. Before joining Orient Bank, he was the Finance Director at Equity Bank (Uganda). In 2015, he was appointed the Chief Executive Officer at Orient Bank, having headed the institution in an acting capacity since 2014. Since then, he has improved Orient Bank from being the highest loss making bank in Uganda to the top half of the industry.

In 2019, Kakeeto was hired by PostBank Uganda, as the new managing director and chief executive officer, replacing Steven Mukweli who was battling corruption charges.

Since his appointment, he has led a restructuring process to reorganise the operations of the bank, resulting in the Central Bank granting PostBank with a Class 1 licence that allows it to operate as a fully fledged Tier 1 commercial bank.

== See also ==
- List of banks in Uganda
- Banking in Uganda
- Economy of Uganda
