= Kibaale District =

- District
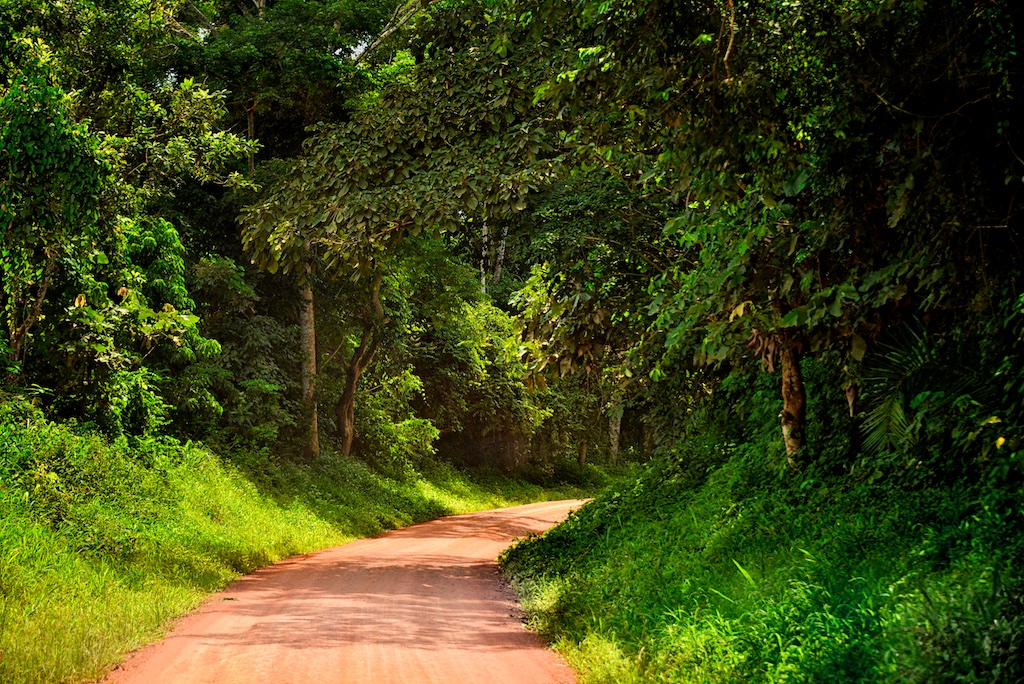

- District location in Uganda
- Coordinates: 00°47′00″N 31°05′00″E
- Country: Uganda
- Region: Western Region
- Sub-region: Bunyoro sub-region
- Capital: Kibaale

Area
  - Total: 5,100.8 km^{2} (1,969.4 sq mi)
  - Land: 4,245.8 km^{2} (1,639.3 sq mi)
  - Water: 855 km^{2} (330 sq mi)
- Elevation: 1,130 m (3,710 ft)

Population (2014 Census)
  - Total: 681,300
  - Density: 160.5/km^{2} (416/sq mi)
- Time zone: UTC+3 (EAT)
- Website: www.kibaale.go.ug

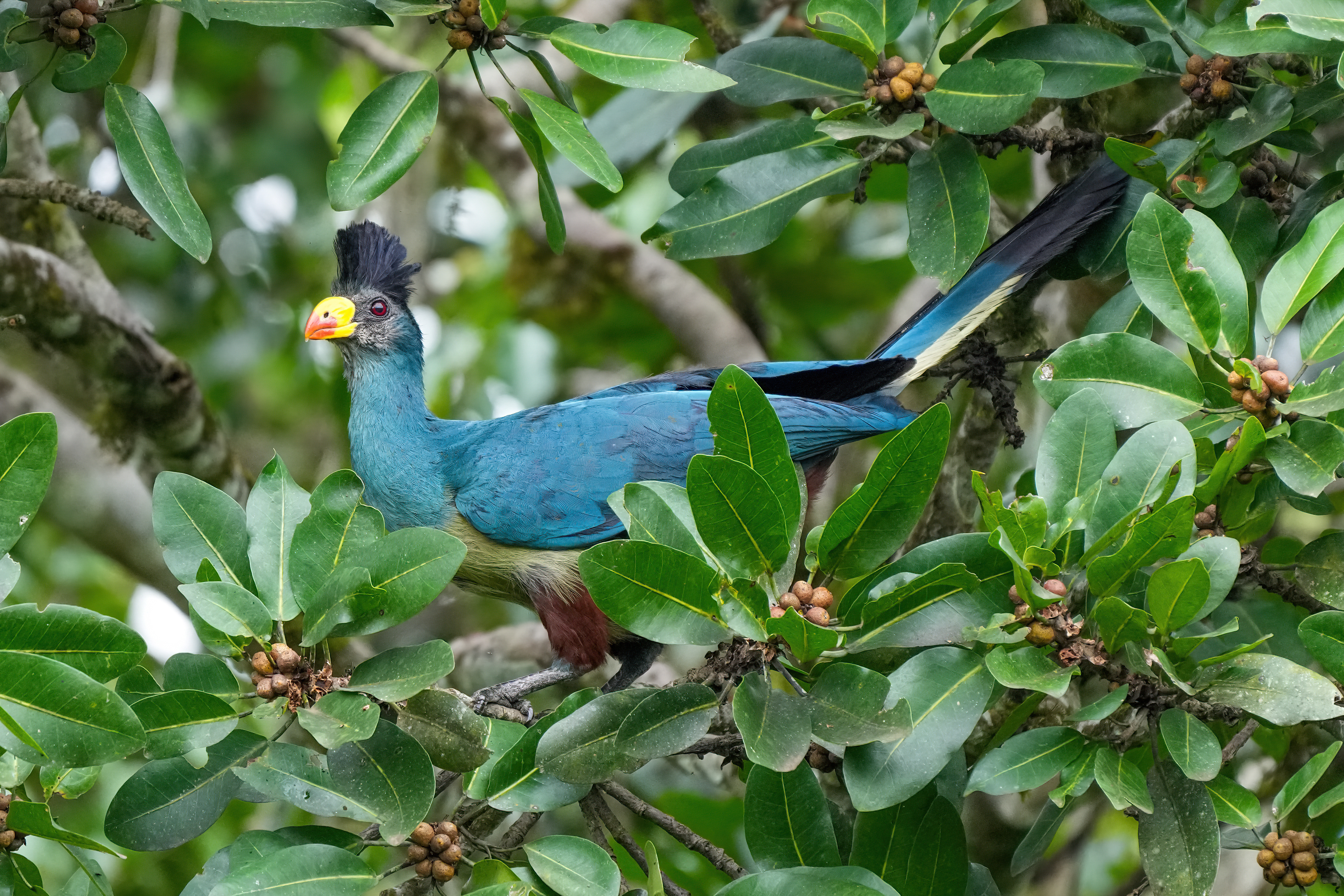
Great blue turaco at Kibale forest National Park in Kibaale district

Kibaale District is a district in the Western Region of Uganda. The district headquarters are in the town of Kibaale.

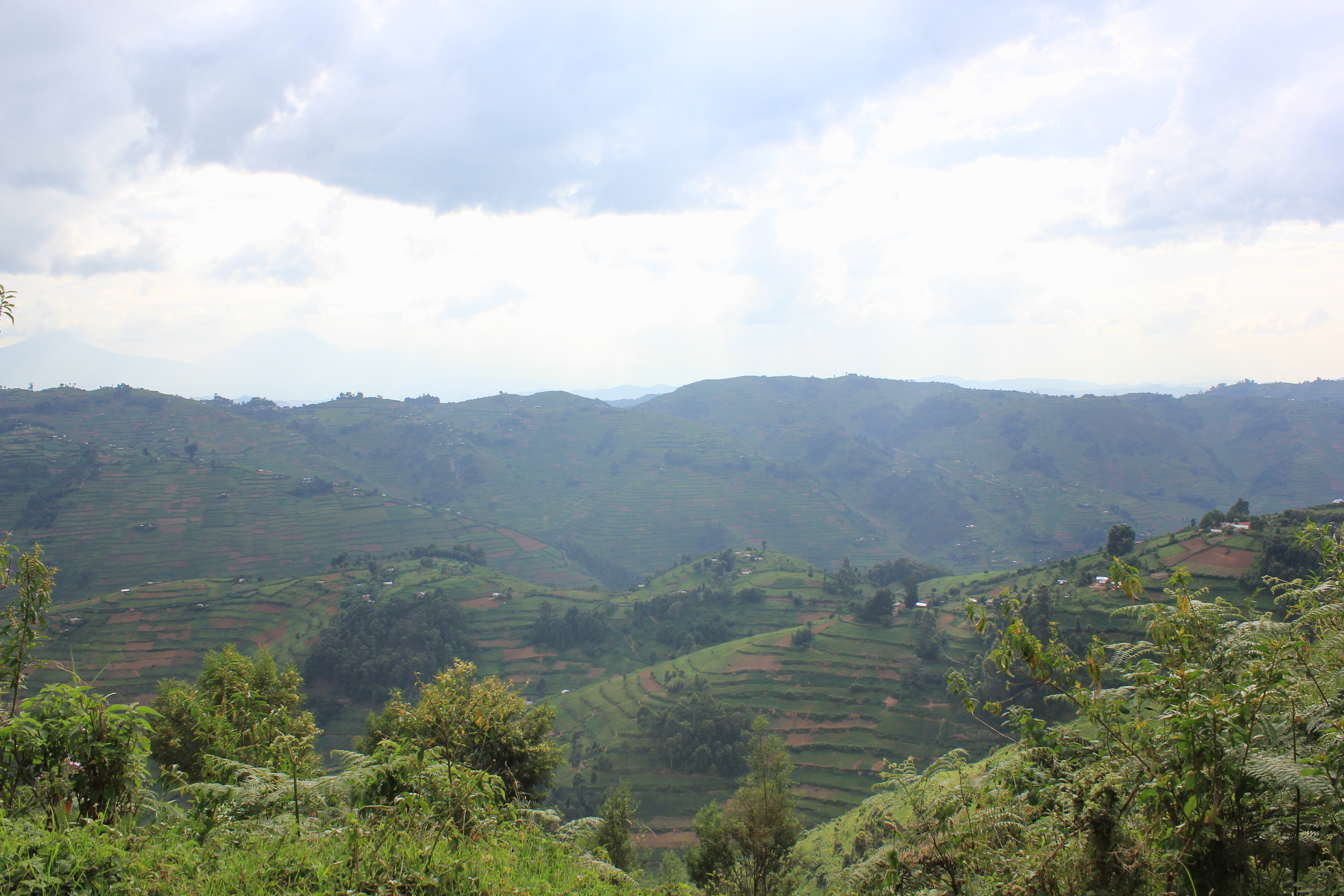
Kibaale District, hilly area

== Location ==
Kibaale District is bordered by Hoima District to the north, Kyankwanzi District to the north-east, Mubende District to the east, Kyegegwa District to the south-east, Kyenjojo District and Kabarole District to the south-west, and Ntoroko District to the west. The district headquarters at Kibaale are approximately 219 kilometres (136 mi), by road, west of Kampala, Uganda's capital and largest city. The coordinates of the district are 00°47'00.0"N, 31°05'00.0"E (Latitude:0.783333; Longitude:31.083333).

Kibaale District is divided into small Administrative offices from county, sub county, town council, parish and village.

=== Buyanja County ===
==== Bubango ====
- Bubango
- Kigujju
- Rwega

==== Bwamiramira ====
- Kahyoro
- Kibingo
- Kibaali
- Kikaada
- Kiribanga

==== Kabasekende ====
- Bukonda
- Kabasekende
- Nyamugura
- Rwamagando

==== Kibaale Town Council ====
- Kabalega Ward
- Kamurasi Ward
- Maasaza Ward
- Ruguuza Ward

==== Kyakazihire ====
- Kacu
- Kyakazihire
- Maisuka
- Rwamagando

==== Mugarama ====
- Imara
- Kezimbira
- Kituuma
- Mugarama

==== Nyamarunda ====
- Bujogoro
- Kibogo
- Kyanyi
- Nyamarunda

==== Nyamarunda Town Council ====
- Kateete Ward
- Kitonezi Ward
- Kibeedi Ward
- Nyamarunda ward

=== Buyanja East County ===
==== Karama ====
- Bucuhya
- Kisindizi
- Kitutu
- Nkenda

==== Kasimbi ====
- Kasozi
- Kicunda
- Kihebeba
- Manyinya

==== Kayanja ====
- Kasenyi
- Kayanja
- Kisojo
- Wantema

==== Kyebando ====
- Kirasa
- Kisalizi
- Kiyanja
- Mutagata
- Rusenke

==== Matale ====
- Kaisekenkere
- Karangara
- Kitaba
- Kitengeto

==== Nyamarwa ====
- Igoza
- Kamondo
- Kyakatwanga
- Nyamarwa

== Overview ==
The largest town in the district is Kagadi, in Buyaga County, followed by Karuguuza in Buyanja County. A main trunk road was built in 1997, the result of co-operation between the governments of Uganda and Ireland. The road connects the towns of Mubende, Kakumiro, Kibaale, and Kagadi.

The Ugandan government had plans in 2012 to split the district into three smaller districts. Those plans, however, are on hold because of funding constraints.

== History ==
Kibaale District is part of the Kingdom of Bunyoro, one of the traditional monarchies in Uganda. The kingdom is coterminous with the Bunyoro sub-region. Kibaale District is part of an area known as the "Lost Counties". The 1900 Buganda Agreement defined the boundaries of the Buganda Kingdom, including the important areas of Bunyoro south and east of the Kafu River. The "Lost Counties" were included as a sub-national territorial element of Buganda. The administration of the Lost Counties as well as Bunyoro itself was modelled on the Buganda political system and under the leadership of Baganda chiefs. In a referendum held in November 1964, the residents in the two lost counties voted to return to the Kingdom of Bunyoro.

== Ebola outbreak ==
In July 2012, an outbreak of Ebola virus disease was reported in Kagadi, and as of 14 August 2012 had infected 24 and killed 16, a 66 percent case fatality rate. Officials urged people not to panic, and a national emergency task force was established. The government, the World Health Organization, and the U.S. Centers for Disease Control and Prevention sent experts to tackle the outbreak.

== Population ==
The 1991 national population census estimated the district population at 220,300. In 2002, the national census put the population at 405,900. The annual population growth rate of the district was estimated at 5.4 percent. It has been estimated that the population in 2012 was 681,300. The national population census estimated the district population at 140,947 in 2014, and The national population census also estimated the population at 237,649 in 2024.

== Demographics ==
According to the 2002 national census, about 60 percent of the population were Catholics, 30 percent belonged to the Church of Uganda, and 3 percent were Muslim. The district, like most of the Western Region, is a predominantly rural area, with an average population density of around 145 square kilometres (56 mi^{2}). Only about 1 percent of the inhabitants live in urban settlements. Kibaale District has the highest fertility rate in Uganda (8.2).

== Economic activity ==
- Coffee
- Matooke(Banana)Cassava
- Sweet potatoes
- Brans
- Maize
- Rice
- Tourism

== Livestock ==
- Poultry
- Cattle
- Goat

== See also ==
- Districts of Uganda
- Western Region, Uganda
- Parliament of Uganda
