= Bunyangabu District =

- District
- Interactive map of Bunyangabu District
- Coordinates: 00°29′N 30°12′E
- Country: Uganda
- Region: Western Uganda
- Sub-region: Toro sub-region
- Established: 1st July, 2017
- Capital: Kibiito

Government
  - District Chairman (LCV): Hon. James Ategeka Mugarama

Population (2014 census)
  - Total: 171,292
- Time zone: UTC+3 (EAT)
- Website: www.bunyangabu.go.ug

Bunyangabu District is a district in the Western Region of Uganda. The town of Kibiito is the political and administrative center of the district. However, the town of Rwimi, (pop. 16,256) is the largest and main commercial center of Bunyangabu.

== Location ==
Bunyangabu is bordered by Kabarole District to the north, Kamwenge District to the east, Kasese District to the south and Bundibugyo District to the west. The town of Kibiito, where the district headquarters are located, is approximately 33 kilometres (21 mi), by road, southwest of Fort Portal, the largest city in Toro sub-region. This is approximately 330 kilometres (205 mi), by road, west of Kampala, the capital and largest city of Uganda.

== Overview ==
Before 1 July 2017, Bunyangabu was a county in neighboring Kabarole District. On that day, the new district became operational. Bunyangabu comprises Rwimi, Kibiito, Buheesi, Kiyombya, Kisomoro, Kabonero, Kateebwa and Bukara sub-counties and town councils of Rwimi, Kibiito, Nyakigumba, Kakinga, Buheesi, Kyamukube and Rubona. During the first 12 months of operation, the new district was allocated USh12,758,591,000.

== Population ==
The national census and household survey conducted in 2024, enumerated the district population at 218,723 people.

== Prominent people ==
Notable people who hail from Bunyangabu include: (1) Adolf Mwesige, the former area member of parliament, (2) Peace Mutuuzo, the current Minister of State for Gender and Culture in the Cabinet of Uganda, and (3) Hon James Ategeka Mugarama, the current LCV chairman, the late Hajj Rashid Kwebiiha family Longtime producers of milk and agricultural products like matooke on a large scale.

== Administration ==
On 1 July 2017, the elected 14 sub-county representatives, who represented Bunyangabu county at the Kabarole district council were transferred to Kibiito to form the district council for the new district. On 3 July 2017 the 14 Bunyangabu district councillors elected, from among themselves, Peter Musinguzi, to serve as interim district chairman (Local Council 5 chairperson), until the Uganda Electoral Commission can hold district-wide elections. Prior to his current position, Peter Musinguzi served as the secretary for finance in the Kabarole district council.

== See also ==
- Fort Portal–Kasese–Mpondwe Road
