= Kyegegwa District =

- District
- District location in Uganda
- Coordinates: 00°29′N 31°03′E
- Country: Uganda
- Region: Western Region
- Sub-region: Toro sub-region
- Established: 1 July 2009
- Capital: Kyegegwa

Area
  - Total: 1,747 km^{2} (675 sq mi)
- Elevation: 1,400 m (4,600 ft)

Population (2012 Estimate)
  - Total: 159,800
  - Density: 91.5/km^{2} (237/sq mi)
- Time zone: UTC+3 (EAT)
- Website: www.kyegegwa.go.ug

Kyegegwa District is a district in Western Region of Uganda. The town of Kyegegwa hosts the district headquarters.

== Location ==
Kyegegwa District is bordered by Kibaale District to the north, Mubende District to the east, Kiruhura District to the south, Kamwenge District to the south-west, and Kyenjojo District to the north-west. Kyegegwa is approximately 110 kilometres (68 mi), east of Fort Portal, the largest town in the Toro sub-region.

== Overview ==
Kyegegwa District was created by an act of the Ugandan Parliament, on 1 July 2009. Before then, the district was part of Kyenjojo District. Kyegegwa District is part of the Tooro sub-region, which is coterminous with Tooro Kingdom.

== Population ==
In 1991, the national population census estimated the district population at 63,500. The national census in 2002 estimated the population at 110,900. In 2012, the mid-year population was estimated at 159,800.

== Administration ==
The current District Chairperson is Byamukama Kisoke John elected for 2016–2021 and 2021–2026 on NRM ticket.

== The economic activities ==
- Livestock farming
- cultivation mainly; maize, bananas, fruits, beans, groundnuts, cassava, millet, iris potatoes, sweet potatoes.
- Aquaculture/Fish farming
- Business in agricultural produce and livestock
- Apiculture (beekeeping): The District has a total number of 200 active beekeepers with estimated honey production of 30 tonnes per year. Kakabara sub county ranks in honey production contributing 40% of the estimated production in the District. Beekeeping has helped communities in the District to improve on their livelihoods since it does not require much land and has minimum management activities compared to other activities such as livestock and crop. The Entomology sector as mandated has continued to engage more farmers to start beekeeping as well technically guiding active beekeepers on core challenges related to management of apiaries, value addition and marketing.

One of the major sources of income of Kyegegwa is markets, mainly the Rwensasi market, located in Ruyonza sub-county, Kyaka South, Kyegegwa district. It is in the southwestern part of the district, 12 km along Kyegegwa-Katonga road.

Rwensasi market is a farmers' group business Mpara Farmers Association initiated by Katuramu George William in 1998. It was formed after the closure of Nyarubabo market in 1992, due to east-coast fever.

Rwensasi market contributes 60% of Ruyonza sub county and 40% of Kyegegwa district.
