= John Methuen Coote =

- Born: 13 March 1878; Cambridge, England
- Died: 4 October 1967 (aged 89); New Forest, Hampshire, England
- Occupation: Colonial administrator
- Known for: Kivu frontier incident

John Methuen Coote (13 March 1878 – 4 October 1967) was a British colonial administrator who served in the East Africa Protectorate. He is known for a stand-off with the Belgians over the location of the border between the Belgian Congo and the British territories.

== Family ==
John Methuen Coote was born on 13 March 1878 in Cambridge, England. His parents were Sir Algernon Charles Plumptre Coote, 12th Baronet, and Jean Trotter. On 24 September 1912 he married Leonore Wray Trench, daughter of John Townsend Trench and Leonora Wray. Their children were Joanna Frances Coote (1913–2003) and Diana Jean Coote (1914–2004).

== Career ==
Coote joined the Uganda administration as an assistant collector on 24 November 1905. In December 1908 he returned to Uganda from leave in Europe and was again posted to the Bukedi District. Almost as soon as he arrived the District Commissioner, Sydney Ormsby, died. Coote took over as District Commissioner at Mbale.

At the end of May 1909 a runner brought him orders to report to Entebbe. There he was told to go to Mbarara and there take charge of a mixed force of Sikhs, King's African Rifles and Police as Political Officer. With this force he was to establish a post on Lake Kivu and to administer the surrounding district. Coote did not waste time. He left Entebbe on 7 June and the expedition left Mbarara on 11 June.

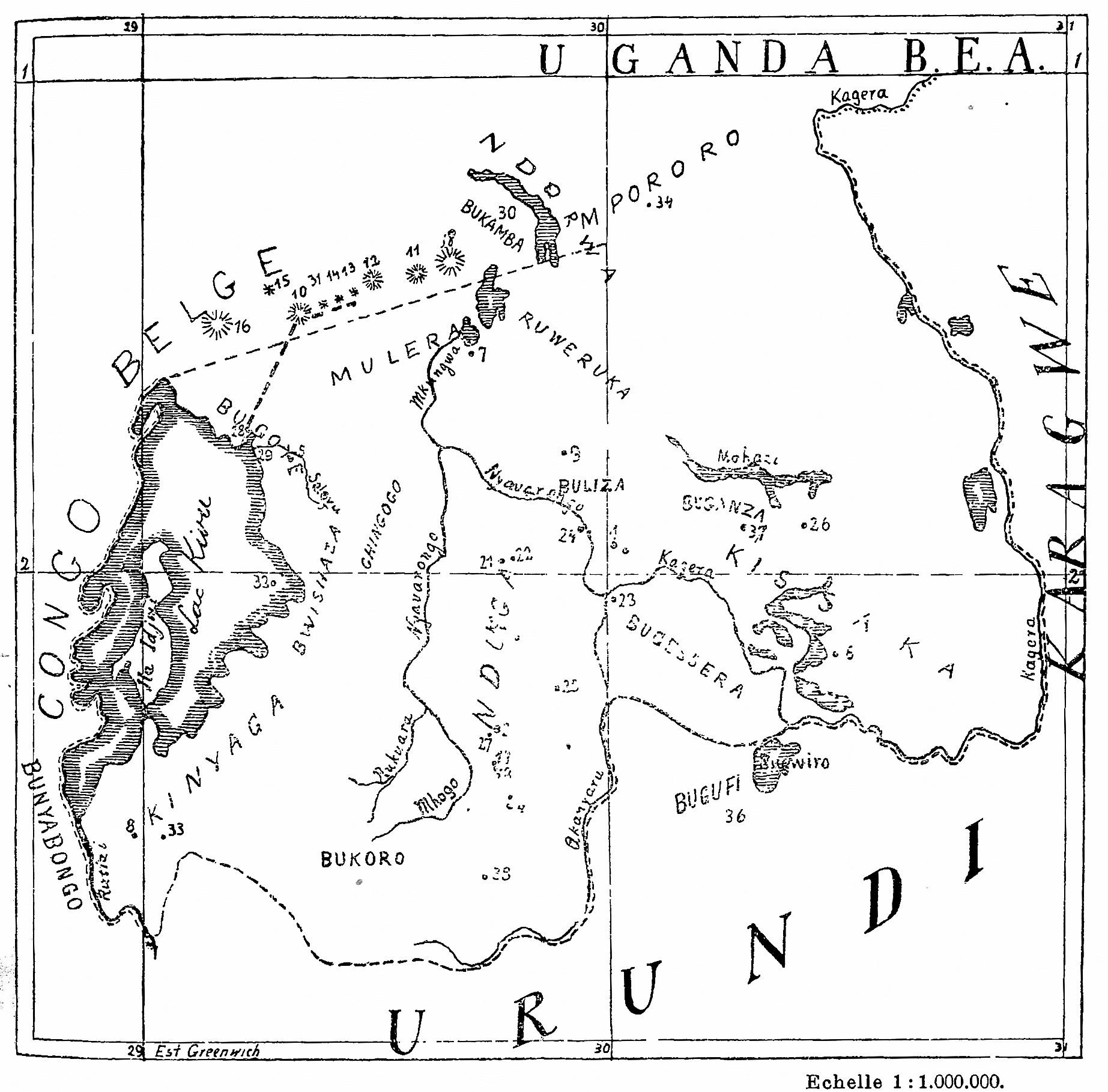
1912 map of Ruanda. Alternate borders shown north of Lake Kivu in the west

German East Africa, British East Africa and the Belgian Congo all adjoined the area around Lake Kivu, but the borders were not well defined. The Germans had ceded the plain of Ufumbiro near Rutshuru (Note: Rutshuru is in the Albertine Rift between Lake Kivu and Lake Edward. Today it is in the North Kivu province of the eastern Democratic Republic of the Congo. The Ugandan border is 15 kilometres (9.3 mi) east and the Rwandan border is 30 kilometres (19 mi) south-east.) to the British despite its clearly being in Belgian territory. Coote notified the Belgians on 26 June 1909 that he was taking possession of the area. The Belgian soldier Frederik-Valdemar Olsen travelled there from the Lake Albert region, arrested two British soldiers camped at Kurezi, and created three redoubts that blocked all access by the British. Coote decided to repossess Kurezi but was stopped in a marshy region and ran low of food. Olsen refused to meet Coote until he withdrew, which Coote would not do, and a stalemate ensued for ten months while the Belgian, German and British governments agreed on their respective borders in the region. The Kivu border question was eventually settled in May 1910.

Coote resigned on 2 January 1912. On 6 October 1915 he was appointed Political Officer, South Kavirondo. In 1917 he was Liaison Officer with the Belgians after they had occupied Tabora. On 18 November 1918 he was made an officer of the Order of the British Empire for distinguished service in connection with military operations in East Africa. Coote died on 4 October 1967 in New Forest, Hampshire, England.

== Publications ==
- Coote, John Methuen (1917), Army correspondence book
- Coote, John Methuen (1955), John Methuen Coote Correspondence
- J.M. Coote (1956), "The Kivu Mission, 1909-10", Uganda Journal, 20

== Sources ==
- Ayre, Peter (2018), "COOTE, John Methuen OBE", Europeans In East Africa
- Lederer, A. (1968), Biographie Belge d'Outre-Mer (in French), vol. VI, Académie Royale des Sciences d'Outre-Mer, pp. col. 783–790
- Louis, William Roger (1963), Ruanda-Urundi, 1884-1919, Calrendon Press
