= Kyenjojo District =

- District
- District location in Uganda
- Coordinates: 00°37′N 30°37′E
- Country: Uganda
- Region: Western Region of Uganda
- Sub-region: Toro sub-region
- Established: 1 July 2000
- Capital: Kyenjojo

Area
  - Land: 2,350.1 km^{2} (907.4 sq mi)

Population (2012 Estimate)
  - Total: 383,600
  - Density: 163.2/km^{2} (423/sq mi)
- Time zone: UTC+3 (EAT)
- Website: www.kyenjojo.go.ug

Kyenjojo District is a district in the Western Region of Uganda. Kyenjojo town is the site of the district headquarters.

== Location ==
Kyenjojo District is bordered by Kagadi District to the north, Kibale District to the north-east, Kyegegwa District to the east, Kamwenge District to the south, and Kabarole District to the west. The district headquarters at Kyenjojo are approximately 274 kilometres (170 mi), by road, west of Kampala, Uganda's capital and largest city. The coordinates of the district are 00 37N, 30 37E.

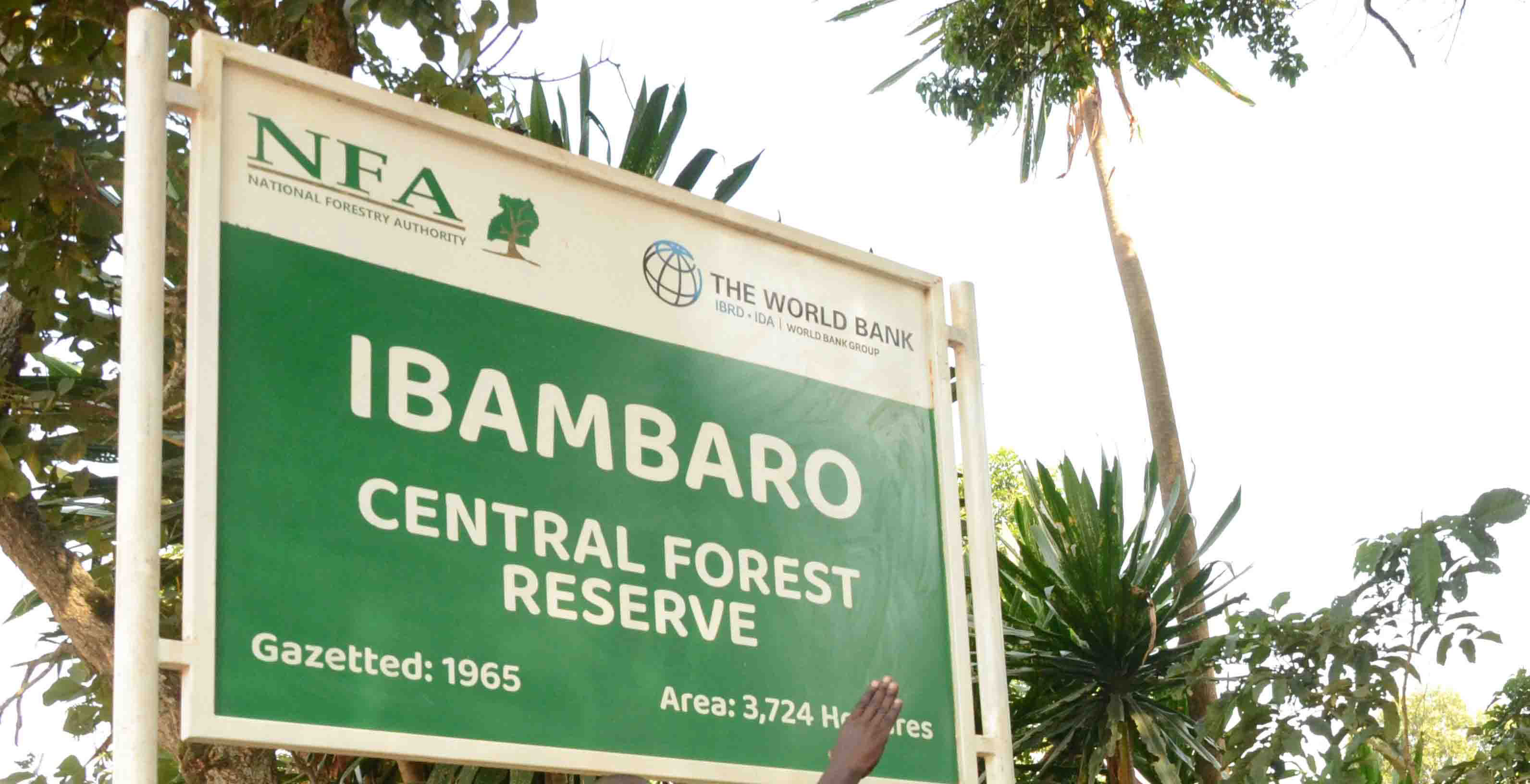
Ibambaro, Kyenjojo.jpg

== Overview ==
Kyenjojo District was created in 2000. It is divided into three counties: Mwenge North, Mwenge Central and Mwenge South. Kyenjojo means: "the place where elephants live"; it is derived from the Runyoro-Rutooro word "enjojo", (elephant)(s). It shares meaning with Kaberamaido district which means the land of elephants from Iteso words, "kaberama" for elephant(s) and "ido" meaning"place of/for". Both districts were formed in 2000. Like in most Ugandan Bantu languages, "Mwenge" means "banana beer", which is produced there.

The district is part of Toro sub-region, which is coterminal with the Kingdom of Toro, one of the ancient traditional monarchies in Uganda, formerly a part of Bunyoro-Kitara Kingdom.

== Population ==
The 1991 national census estimated the district population at about 182,000. The next national census, in 2002, estimated the population at 266,250. In 2012, the population was estimated at 383,600.

== Economic activities ==
Agriculture is the main economic activity in the district. The major crops grown include:

- Tea
- Coffee
- Cassava
- Sweet potatoes
- Potatoes
- Yams
- Millet
- Maize
- Sorghum
- Beans
- Peas
- Groundnuts
- Soybeans
- Bananas
- Matooke
- Passion fruit
- Mangoes
- Avocado
- Cabbage
- Tomatoes
- Pineapple
- Onion
- Timber
