= Bunyoro sub-region =

Region in Western Uganda

Coordinates: 00°33′N 30°45′E

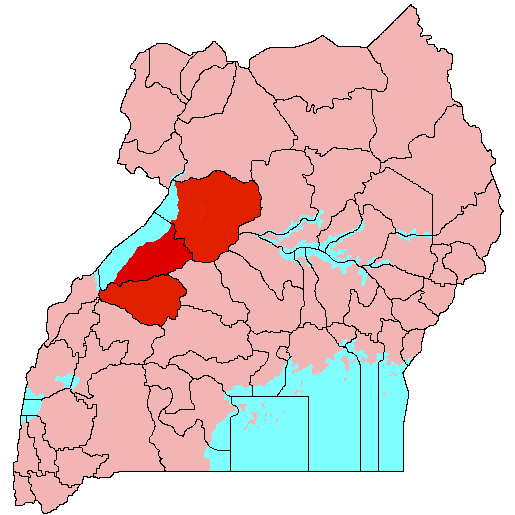
Bunyoro Sub-region

Bunyoro sub-region is a region in Western Uganda that consists of the following districts:

- Buliisa District
- Hoima City
- Hoima District
- Kagadi District
- Kakumiro District
- Kibaale District
- Kikuube District
- Kiryandongo District
- Masindi District

The area covered by the above districts is coterminous with the traditional Bunyoro Kingdom. Milton Obote abolished the traditional kingdoms in Uganda in 1967. When Yoweri Museveni re-established them in 1993, Bunyoro re-constituted itself.

The sub-region is home mainly to the Banyoro ethnic group. The people of Bunyoro are called Banyoro (singular: Munyoro). The Banyoro speak Runyoro, a Bantu language. Runyoro closely related to Rutooro, spoken by the people of the neighboring Toro sub-region. The language is often referred to as Runyoro/Rutooro - a dialect of the larger Runyakitara language.

According to the 2002 national census, the Bunyoro sub-region was home to an estimated 0.75 million people at that time.

== Ethnicity and language ==
The Banyoro people, also known as Nyoro / Bakitara, are a Bantu ethnic group native to the kingdom of Bunyoro in Uganda. They live in settlements on a well-watered and fertile plateau, in western Uganda, east of Lake Mobutu. The region comprises the districts of Buliisa, Hoima, Kibaale, Kiryandongo and Masindi. They speak the Nyoro language, also known as Runyoro. In the Paluo area of northern Bunyoro, a language related to the Luo language is also spoken.

The Bunyoro Kingdom was one of the most powerful kingdoms in Central and East Africa from the 13th century to the 19th century. Today, the kingdom is one of the administrative regions that make up the modern Republic of Uganda, and it is ruled by the King (Omukama) of Bunyoro-Kitara.

== Culture and society ==
The Banyoro people reside in settlements across their region, with clan systems remaining integral to their social structure. In each family, the father holds a position of authority as the "mukama" or master/ head of the household, overseeing family members and possessions.

Traditionally, the Banyoro are agriculturalists, cultivating crops (the Bairu class) such as millet, sorghum, bananas, and yams, and raising livestock (the Bahuma class), especially cattle, goats, sheep, chickens, and turkeys. They also preserve their culture through traditional dances, music, and storytelling.

== Major cities and towns ==
The largest city in Bunyoro is Hoima city. Others include Masindi, Kagadi, Buliisa, Kibaale, Kiryandongo, and Kigumba

== Tourism ==
Bunyoro has a great deal of tourist attractions including :

- Bugoma Central Forest Reserve
- Mparo tombs
- Omukama's palace at Karuzika
- Chimpanzee Sanctuary and wildlife conservation Hoima.
- The Empaako (Praise name)
- Munsa Fort
- Igayaza Chwezi historical sites with foot prints of Ndahura (the first Chwezi king) and that of his dog
- Murchision Falls National Park
- Tonya-Kabwoya wildlife reserve with Lake Albert Safari Lodge
- St. Andrea Kaahwa (The martyr also known as Andrew Kaggwa)
- St. Anatole Kirigwaijo (another Ugandan martyr)
- Nyante river at Kikwaya a point where Omukama Kabalega's cattle perished
- The tomb of King Duhaga at Kakumiro
- Hoima City Stadium
- Kibiro
- Katasiiha Fort

== Demographics ==
The 2024 Uganda national population and housing census projected Bunyoro to be with a population of 2,792,732 people.

== Ethnic groups ==
he majority of people in Bunyoro are Banyoro. Other ethnic groups include the Batooro, Basongora, Bahema, Baruuli, Banyankole, Bakiga and Baganda

== See also ==
- Regions of Uganda
- Districts of Uganda
