= Tooro sub-region =

Sub-region of Uganda in the Western Region

- Sub-region
- Interactive map of Tooro sub-region
- Coordinates: 0°40′N 30°16′E
- Country: Uganda
- Region: Western Region
- Administrative centre: Fort Portal

Population (2024 Ugandan census)
  - Total: 2,154,161
- Time zone: UTC+3 (EAT)

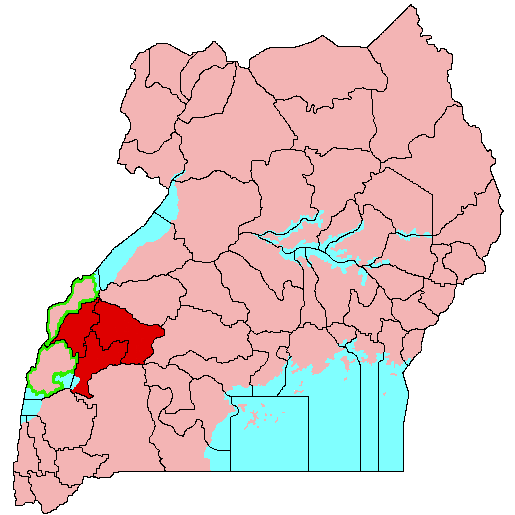
Tooro sub-region since 1993

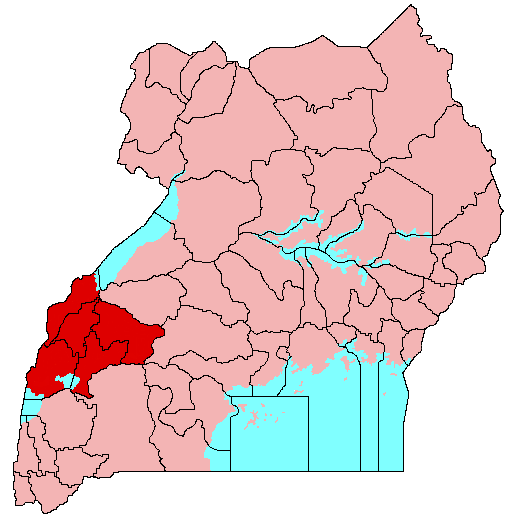
Original Tooro sub-region and its districts

Tooro sub-region is a region in Uganda that is coterminous with Tooro Kingdom in Western Uganda.

== Administrative divisions ==
As of 2019, the districts that constitute the Tooro sub-region include the following:

- Bunyangabu District (formerly part of Kabarole District until 2017)
- Kabarole District
- Kamwenge District (formerly part of Kabarole District until 2000)
- Kyegegwa District (formerly part of Kyenjojo District until 2009)
- Kyenjojo District (formerly part of Kabarole District until 2000)
- Kitagwenda District (formerly part of Kamwenge District until 2019)

Prior to 1993, the Tooro sub-region also included the following, which are now part of Rwenzururu sub-region:

- Bundibugyo District (formerly part of Kabarole District [then known as Tooro District] until 1974)
- Kasese District (formerly part of Kabarole District [then known as Tooro District] until 1974)
- Ntoroko District (formerly part of Bundibugyo District until 2010)

== History ==
In 1967, Milton Obote abolished the Uganda traditional monarchies. When Yoweri Museveni restored them in 1993, the sub-region had shrunk to its present size after Obudhingiya bwa Bwamba in Bundibugyo district and Obusinga bwa Rwenzururu in Kasese district became independent. The sub-region was home to an estimated 2 million people in 2002.

== Administrative divisions ==
The sub-region comprises six districts and one city, as reported in the 2024 census results published by the Uganda Bureau of Statistics (UBOS) through CityPopulation.de.

Administrative divisions of Tooro sub-region (UBOS censuses 2014 and 2024)
Division	Status	Population (2014)	Population (2024)
Bunyangabu District	District	170,247	219,012
Fort Portal	City	102,240	137,549
Kabarole District	District	196,749	230,368
Kamwenge District	District	270,668	337,167
Kitagwenda District	District	143,786	184,947
Kyegegwa District	District	281,637	501,120
Kyenjojo District	District	422,204	543,998

== Geography and environment ==
Tooro sub-region lies in western Uganda and includes the Fort Portal plateau and surrounding landscapes, with crater lakes and tea-growing areas described for the wider Fort Portal–Kibale landscape. Parts of the sub-region are associated with major conservation and tourism areas, including Kibale National Park, which UWA describes as 795 km² in area and centred on the Fort Portal plateau with key tourism sites at Kanyanchu and Sebitoli (near Fort Portal).

== Demographics ==
=== Population ===
The population of Tooro sub-region increased from 1,587,531 (2014) to 2,154,161 (2024).

=== Sex and age structure (2024) ===
UBOS 2024 census figures (via CityPopulation.de) report 1,040,079 males and 1,114,082 females in the sub-region. Age-group totals reported for 2024 are 953,848 (0–14 years), 1,127,021 (15–64 years), and 73,292 (65+ years).

== Economy ==
Agriculture supports much of the sub-region’s livelihoods. Tea cultivation and processing form part of the local economy around the Fort Portal–Kibale landscape, which UWA describes as “carpeted with tea plantations” in areas east of the Rwenzori Mountains and around the Fort Portal plateau. Studies on Uganda’s tea value chain and production highlight western districts including Kabarole and Kyenjojo as important tea-growing areas.

Coffee is also grown in parts of the sub-region. The Uganda Coffee Development Authority’s coffee profiling report lists Kabarole among districts associated with “Highland Ranges” Arabica production, and lists Kitagwenda among districts associated with south-western farm-land coffee production zones in its profiling work based on 2014–2020 samples.

== Society and culture ==
Rutooro (also called Nyoro-Tooro/Runyoro-Rutooro in some classifications) is a major language of the Toro area, and is widely used alongside English in public life and education.

The Empaako naming system, a cultural practice shared among several communities in western Uganda including the Batooro, is listed by UNESCO on the List of Intangible Cultural Heritage in Need of Urgent Safeguarding.

The sub-region is closely linked to the Tooro Kingdom (Obukama bwa Tooro), whose royal seat is in Fort Portal. The kingdom’s official site profiles the institution and its monarch, Oyo Nyimba Kabamba Iguru Rukidi IV.

== Education and health ==
Mountains of the Moon University is located in the Fort Portal area and is one of the notable higher-education institutions serving the sub-region.

Specialised health services for the wider Rwenzori area are provided through referral facilities based in Fort Portal, including Fort Portal Regional Referral Hospital.

== Tourism and conservation ==
Tourism in and around the sub-region is anchored by protected areas and crater-lake landscapes near Fort Portal. UWA highlights Kibale National Park as a major primate destination with an estimated 1,450 chimpanzees and tourism hubs at Kanyanchu and Sebitoli, linked to Fort Portal by surfaced roads and a newly tarmacked route to Kamwenge/Ibanda.

Fort Portal also sits on a common tourism route linking visitors to other western Uganda protected areas. UWA’s brochure for Queen Elizabeth National Park describes a Kampala–Fort Portal route used for access to Queen Elizabeth and notes that the Fort Portal route supports detours to Kibale and other parks in the Albertine Rift landscape.

== History ==
In 1967, the 1967 republican constitution abolished traditional monarchies in Uganda, including kingdoms in western Uganda. In the early 1990s, Uganda enacted legislation restoring assets and properties to traditional rulers, including the Traditional Rulers (Restitution of Assets and Properties) Act, 1993. Over time, administrative reorganisation created new districts from earlier Tooro District structures, producing the present-day districts listed under Administrative divisions.

== See also ==
- Tooro Kingdom
- Fort Portal
- Kibale National Park
- Western Region, Uganda
