= List of rampage killers in Africa =

This is a list of mass or spree killers in Africa. A mass murderer is typically defined as someone who kills three or more people in one incident, with no "cooling off" period, not including themselves. A mass murder typically occurs in a single location where one or more persons kill several others.

This list does not include serial killers or major figures in politics and government who orchestrated such actions.

== Rampage killers ==
Perpetrator	Date	Year	Location	Country	Killed	Injured	W	Additional Notes	Ref.
Belayneh, Alemayehu Bekeli, Belay, Mathias Solomon; Hussein, Sultan Ali	23 Nov	1996	Grande Comore	Comoros	122	46	M V	All died in the crash	
William Unek (Note: Assailant was a member of the military, police, or a comparable force at the time of the rampage.) (Note: At least one of the victims was a relative of the assailant.)	- 11-16 Feb	1954; 1957	Mahagi; Malampaka	Belgian Congo (Tanganyika Territory) Tanganyika	22 36	? 32+	M FMA	Killed by police	
Khayati, Younes, 32	21 Aug	1994	Douar Izounine	Morocco	43	0	V	Died in the crash. No survivors	
dos Santos Fernandes, Herminio, 49	29 Nov	2013	Bwabwata National Park	Namibia	32	0	V	Died in the crash. No survivors	
Komakech, Richard	26 June	1994	Kampala	Uganda	26	13	F	Killed by one of his victim's father	
Unknown police officer	15 April	1983	Asureti	Uganda	21	?	F	Committed suicide	
Rifai, Omar Abdul Razeq Abdullah, 28	21 Aug	2013	Meet Al Attar	Egypt	15	?	F	Killed by villagers Killed 23 people over the past five years	
Unknown soldier	6 Nov	1995	Nshili	Rwanda	14–17	19	FM	Committed suicide	
Dhendonga, Longo	30 July	2020	Sange	Democratic Republic of the Congo	14	10	F	Sentenced to death	
Ogwang, Alfred, 28	26 Dec	1994	Kamwenge	Uganda	13	14	F	Convicted	
Unknown	5 Nov	2016	Juba	South Sudan	13	10	F	Unsolved	
Opetu, Babby Ndombe, 32	22 July	2023	Nyakova	Democratic Republic of the Congo	13	2	F	Sentenced to death	
Nasha, Fekadu	12 May	2013	Bahir Dar	Ethiopia	12–18	2	F	Committed suicide	
Mogo	12 May	1929	Kitale	Kenya	12	1	M	Sentenced to death and executed	
Ben Jebir, 28	25 March	1985	Fahs	Tunisia	12	?	F	Committed suicide Terminated a pregnancy	
Vukwana, Bulelani, 29	9 Feb	2002	East London	South Africa	11	6	F	Committed suicide	
Amanyire, Chris	11 April	2014	Karugutu	Uganda	10	25	F	Committed suicide	
Odoch, Patrick Okot	9 March	2013	Pakele & Gogonya	Uganda	10	3	F	Sentenced to 90 years in prison	
Karanja, Peter, 37	6 Nov	2010	Siakago	Kenya	10	0	F	Sentenced to 20 years in prison	
Delport, Carel Johannes, 36	20 Jan	1992	Ladysmith	South Africa	9	19	F A	Sentenced to 39 years in prison Had killed two people previously	
Unknown	14 Jan	2001	Brazzaville	Republic of the Congo	9	2	F	Committed suicide	
Muhamali		1924		(Tanganyika Territory) Tanganyika	9	0		Committed suicide	
Kalanga			Bukoba District	(Tanganyika Territory) Tanganyika	9	?		Committed suicide	
Ogunbiyi, Sunkanmi	27 March	2014	Eleweran	Nigeria	8–9	1	F	Committed suicide	
Swart, Stephanus Andries Johannes, 37	6 May	1927	Charlestown	South Africa	8–9	3	F	Committed suicide	
Kh., Atef, 48	18 May	2026	Abnub	Egypt	8	6	F V	Killed by security forces	
Unknown	27 April	1912	Steamboat Africa	Atlantic Ocean, off (Portugal) Portuguese São Tomé and Príncipe	8	23	M	Killed	
Katwesigye, Moses Katoko	21 April	2016	Kiruruma	Uganda	8	3	F	Sentenced to 90 years in prison	
Unknown soldier	3/4 Feb	1933	Lomé	Togo	8	2	F	Killed by soldiers	
Mateane, Chippa, 42	3 April	2006	Gauteng	South Africa	8	2	F	Killed by police Terminated a pregnancy Bystander run over and killed by police	
Nabénéza, Germain, 35	13 Nov	1994	La Grande Montée	Réunion	8	1	FM	Committed suicide	
Kiti		1940	Rumuruti district	Kenya	8	?	MA	Sentenced to prison	
Barend Strydom	15 November	1988	Pretoria	South Africa	7	16	F	Sentenced to death but was later pardoned	
Brotto, Soera	25/26 Sep	1786	Cape Town	Cape Colony	7	10	M	Sentenced to death and executed	
Mucunguzi, Nicholas	2 May	2009	Kampala	Uganda	7	6	F	Committed suicide or killed	
Kheshow, Thubelihle, 26	9 Oct	2021	Redcliff	Zimbabwe	7	5	M	Found not guilty by reason of insanity	
Unknown Soldier	18 June	2007	Waat	Sudan	7	3	F	Killed by soldiers	
Lino, Africano Abono	15 Oct	2006	Laguti	Uganda	7	2+	F	Sentenced to death	
Obua, Isaac	16 June	2016	Kampala	Uganda	7	1–2	F	Killed	
Meyer, Paul Johannes, 35 (Note: At least one of the victims was a relative of the assailant.)	2/3 June	2004	Johannesburg	South Africa	7	0	F	Committed suicide Terminated a pregnancy	
Michael, Bawa	11 Nov	2001	Kaduna	Nigeria	7	?	F	Sentenced to death	
Lemba Abdallah, Alain	4/5 May	2013	Mongo	Democratic Republic of the Congo	6–7	6–7	F	Sentenced to death	
Ngobi, Fred	23 March	1998	Kampala	Uganda	6–7	0–1	F	Committed suicide	
Opwonya, Kenneth Albino	2 July	2008	Omiya-Nyima IDP camp	Uganda	6	8	F	Sentenced to death	
Ndayisaba, Jean-Claude, 21	8 Oct	1999	Ruyaga	Burundi	6	7	F	Sentenced to death	
Lombard, Petrus Lafras, 48		1954	Morgenzon	South Africa	6	4	F	Committed suicide	
Unknown police officer	6 Nov	2000	Aïn Bouchekif	Algeria	6	4	F V	Committed suicide	
Nkurunziza, Viateur	10 May	1998	Gikongoro	Rwanda	6	3	F	Killed	
Imbasi, Benson (Note: One of the victims was a relative of the assailant.)	7 Dec	2021	Kabete	Kenya	6	2	F	Committed suicide	
Nivome, Aro	21 May	1971	Abakaliki	Nigeria	6	1	M	Sentenced to death	
Wanyama, Andrew	27 Sep	2007	Arua	Uganda	6	1	F	Killed by soldiers	
Unknown	Dec.	1958	Nzega District	(Tanganyika Territory) Tanganyika	6	?	F	Committed suicide	
Unknown	Aug.	1935	Buta	Belgian Congo	5–6	?	F	Committed suicide	
Khazri, Wissam, 30	9 May	2023	Djerba	Tunisia	5	8	F	Killed by police	
van Heerden, Cornelius Johannes Petrus, 21–22	26 Nov	1931	Bethlehem	South Africa	5	6	F	Committed suicide	
Fortune, Christo Brian, 31	1 July	2002	Postmasburg	South Africa	4	9	FM	Sentenced to four consecutive life terms	
Smith, Leopold, 34	17 June	1963	Umtali	Rhodesia	4	7	F	Sentenced to death and executed	
Angulu, George	21 May	2015	Karenga	Uganda	4	7	F	Committed suicide	
Kabuora, Jeremiah, 38	31 Aug	2024	Kileera	Kenya	4	1	M	Killed by angry crowd	
Onyum, Christopher Okello, 39	2 April	2026	Kampala	Uganda	4	0	M	Sentenced to death	

== Familicides ==
The victims must have been largely the relatives of the perpetrator to be considered a familicide.

Perpetrator	Date	Year	Location	Country	Killed	Injured	W	Additional Notes	Ref.
Berri Khan	Feb.	1914	Tripoli	Libya	10	0	MP	Committed suicide	
Sobhy Ibrahim Abdel-Alim, 42* (صبحى إبراهيم عبد العليم)	19 July	2007	Minya Governorate	Egypt	8	3	F	Sentenced to death	
Kasoma, Christopher, 43*	27 April	2004	Nsangi	Uganda	8	0	M	Committed suicide Terminated two pregnancies	
Siboza, Elias, 60	24 Feb	2000	Clau Clau	South Africa	7	2	F	Committed suicide	
Nkoana, Clifford, 30*	9 nov	1996	Graaff-Reinet	South Africa	7	1	F A	Committed suicide	
Lubbe, Pieter Albertus, 35	10 Jan	1953	Fauresmith	South Africa	7	0	F	Committed suicide	
Jooste, Johnny, 36*	20 Feb	2000	Ceres	South Africa	7	0	F	Sentenced to 38 years	
Byekwaso, Abdallah, 28*	17 Aug	2007	Kiraba	Uganda	7	0	M	Committed suicide	
Feher, Lios, 33*	28 Dec	1969	Benoni	South Africa	6	1	F	Committed suicide	
Kapambe, Lemison, 22	3 June	2012	Pondani	Malawi	6	1	M	Killed by angry mob	
M'Maroo, William, 17	26 May	1988	Linjoka	Kenya	6	0	M	Died while trying to escape	
van Heerden, Jacobus Johannes, 55*	20 Feb	2007	Vanderbijlpark	South Africa	6	0	F	Committed suicide	
Thokamolemo, Orelesitse Modise 26*	Jan.	2008	Letlhakane	Botswana	6	0	M	Sentenced to death and executed	
Mokhali, Tsepang Solomon, 21*	28 Dec	2012	Inanda	South Africa	6	0	FM	Sentenced to six life terms Terminated a pregnancy	

== Abbreviations and footnotes ==
W – A basic description of the weapons used in the murders

F – Firearms and other ranged weapons, especially rifles and handguns, but also bows and crossbows, grenade launchers, flamethrowers, or slingshots
M – Melee weapons, like knives, swords, spears, machetes, axes, clubs, rods, stones, or bare hands
O – Any other weapons, such as bombs, hand grenades, Molotov cocktails, poison and poisonous gas, as well as vehicle and arson attacks

A – indicates that an arson attack was the only other weapon used
V – indicates that a vehicle was the only other weapon used
E – indicates that explosives of any sort were the only other weapon used
P – indicates that an anaesthetising or deadly substance of any kind was the only other weapon used (includes poisonous gas)
