= Kyabandara =

Parish in Kamwenge District, Uganda

Kyabandara is a parish in Kamwenge Subcounty, Kamwenge District in western Uganda. It is predominantly a rural parish with Nfashumwana and Kyabandara as the main trading centres. It neighbors Nkongoro to the southwest and Ganyenda to the south.

== Location ==
It is situated in the western region of Uganda and neighbors of parishes of Nkongoro and Ganyenda. The area is near Kibale National park and Toro-Semiliki Wildlife Reserve., specifically south of Fort Portal (about 18km away).

== Controversy ==
On 19 December 2023, Kyabandara parish was a site of a tragic attack by the suspected Allied Democratic Forces (ADF) rebels. The incident occurred in the Kitehurizi trading center, where ten people were killed and several others injured. The local community faced fear and displacement following the attacks, prompting increased security measures by the Uganda People's Defense Forces (UPDF) in the region.

== See also ==
- Nkongoro
- Kamwenge District
- Ganyenda
- Kamwenge
- Kamwenge Subcounty
