= Kibale County =

- County
- Location of Kibale County in Uganda
- Coordinates: 00°10′49.188″N 30°27′6.516″E
- Country: Uganda
- Region: Western Region of Uganda
- District: Kamwenge District
- Member of Parliament: Abigaba Cuthbert Mirembe
- Time zone: UTC+3 (EAT)

Kibale County is a county in Kamwenge District in the Western Region of Uganda.

== Location ==
Kibale county is north-east of Kitagwenda County (now in Kitagwenda District), west of Kibale East County, the two counties that form Kamwenge District. It is one of the counties that form the geographical area of Tooro Kingdom, one of the ancient traditional monarchies in Uganda. The county consists of eight sub-counties: (a) Kamwenge sub-county (b) Kamwenge Town Council (c) Kahunge Town Council (d) Kahunge sub-county (e) Busiriba sub-county, (f) Kabambiro sub-county, (g) Rukunyu Town Council and (h) Kabuga Town Council. Urban centres include Kamwenge, Kahunge, Bigodi, Rugonjo town and Kabuga Town Council.

== Overview ==
Kibale County is predominantly a rural county within the heart of Kamwenge District. It is home to Kibale Forest, one of the biggest natural forests in Uganda. The major economic activities carried out in Kibale County are farming, tourism, industrialisation and trade.

== Notable people ==
This is the list of notable people from Kibale County.

- Abigaba Cuthbert Mirembe- Member of Parliament for Kibale County in the parliament of Uganda.
- Frank Tumwebaze- Former Member of Parliament for Kibale County and current representative of Kibale East Constituency in the parliament of Uganda
- Edward Bamucwanira-The first and former bishop of East Ruwenzori Diocese, a Diocese of Anglican dominion.
- George Turyasingura-The current bishop of East Ruwenzori Diocese.

== Areas of interest ==
1. Kibale Forest, one of biggest natural forests in Uganda.
2. River Mpanga, a natural river that passes through Kamwenge District.
3. Kabuga hill, the location with the highest elevation in Kibale County.
4. Kahunge town, a town council within the county.
5. Kamwenge Town, the chief town of Kamwenge.
