= Kamwenge Subcounty =

Settlement in Kamwenge district, western Uganda

- Subcounty
- Kamwenge Subcounty
- Country: Uganda
- Region: Western Region
- Sub-region: Tooro sub-region
- District: Kamwenge District
- County: Kibale County
- Seat: Nyabitusi (subcounty headquarters)

Population (2024 census)
  - Total: 19,598
  - Males (2024): 9,170
  - Females (2024): 10,428
- Time zone: UTC+3 (EAT)
- UBOS subcounty code: 413107

Kamwenge Subcounty is a settlement in Kamwenge District, Western Uganda. It is predominantly a rural sub county with Ganyenda and Nyabitusi as the main trading centres. It has five− parishes; Ganyenda, Nkongoro, Kyabandara, Kiziba and Busingye.

== Administration ==
In UBOS 2014 census parish tables for Western Region, Kamwenge Subcounty is listed with five parishes: Businge, Ganyenda, Kakinga, Kiziba, and Kyabandara.

A Kamwenge District works report references the subcounty headquarters at Nyabitusi Parish.

== Demographics ==
Uganda’s 2024 census results (compiled by CityPopulation from UBOS) report a population of 19,598 for Kamwenge Subcounty (9,170 males and 10,428 females). The same source reports 8,605 people aged 0–14, 10,259 aged 15–64, and 734 aged 65+.

In the 2014 census parish tables, the subcounty total population is reported as 22,010.

== Parishes ==
The following table summarises parish-level population and households reported in UBOS 2014 census parish tables for Western Region.

Parish	Population (2014)	Households (2014)
Businge	3,053	650
Ganyenda	2,822	590
Kakinga	5,823	1,301
Kiziba	3,794	809
Kyabandara	2,831	606
Total (subcounty)	22,010	4,784

== Economy ==
Households in Kamwenge District largely rely on agriculture and related rural livelihoods, as reflected in district planning documents, with subcounties serving as key planning and service-delivery units.

A national coffee and cocoa directory lists a private-sector actor located in Ganyenda village, Ganyenda Parish, Kamwenge Subcounty, indicating formal agribusiness activity linked to the coffee and cocoa value chains.

== Infrastructure and services ==
A Kamwenge District works report references works on the Kamwenge Subcounty headquarters in Nyabitusi Parish.

A trade-licensing statutory instrument lists Nyabitusi and Ganyenda in Kamwenge Subcounty among graded business areas, reflecting recognised trading centres within the subcounty.

== See also ==
- Kamwenge District
- Kibale County
- Tooro sub-region
