= Ntara =

Ugandan town

- Location in Uganda; Placement on map is approximate
- Coordinates: 00°00′17″N 30°21′58″E
- Country: Uganda
- Region: Western Uganda
- District: Kitagwenda District
- Municipality: Ntara
- County: Kitagwenda
- Elevation: 4,230 ft (1,290 m)

Ntara is a settlement in Kitagwenda District, in Western Uganda. It is the political, administrative and commercial headquarters of the district. Ntara is one of the two municipalities in the newly created Kitagwenda District, the other being Kabujogera Town Council.

== Location ==
Ntara is located approximately 37 kilometres (23 mi), southwest of Kamwenge, the nearest large town. This is approximately 100 kilometres (62 mi), south of Fort Portal, the nearest large city. Ntara is located approximately 340 kilometres (211 mi), by road, west of Kampala, Uganda's capital and largest city. The geographical coordinates of Ntara are:0°00'17.0"N, 30°21'58.0"E (Latitude:0.004722; Longitude:30.366111).

== Overview ==
The town of Ntara, is the largest urban centre in Kitagwenda District, and it serves as the district headquarters.

== Points of interest ==
These are some of the points of interest in or near Ntara:

- Ntara Town Council
- Ntara central market
- Kitagwenda District Administration headquarters

== See also ==
- Toro sub-region
- Kamwenge District
- Western Region, Uganda
