= Mpanga Hydroelectric Power Station =

Mpanga Power Station
- Map of Uganda showing the location of Mpanga Power Station
- Country: Uganda
- Location: Mpanga
- Coordinates: 00°04′00″N 30°19′16″E
- Status: Operational

Dam and spillways
- Impounds: Mpanga River

Reservoir
- Normal elevation: 1,000 m (3,300 ft)

Power Station
- Commission date: 10 February 2011
- Type: Run-of-the-river
- Turbines: 1
- Installed capacity: 18 MW (24,000 hp)

Mpanga Power Station is an 18 megawatts (24,000 hp) mini hydroelectric power project located across River Mpanga, in Kitagwenda County, Kitagwenda District in Western Uganda.

== Location ==
The power station is located across River Mpanga, in Kitagwenda County, Kitagwenda District where the district headquarters are located, approximately 25 kilometres (16 mi), by road, southwest of Kamwenge. This location is approximately 305 kilometres (190 mi), by road, west of Kampala, Uganda's capital and largest city.

== Overview ==
Mpanga Power Station is situated at the location of Mpanga Falls, on Mpanga River. The 18.0 MW power station was developed by Africa Energy Management Systems. Construction began in 2007. The completed power station came online in 2011. A new 33kV transmission line connects the power station to the national electrical grid. As of February 2011, construction of the power station was complete. Technical commissioning was scheduled for Thursday 10 February 2011, while the public commissioning was planned for March 2011. Construction of the power station was undertaken by a Sri Lankan hydropower construction company called VS Hydro (Private) Limited, at an estimated cost of US$26 million.

Mpanga Hydro Power is owned by Serengeti Energy and all the engineering tasks including Operations and Maintenance is done by Serengeti Energy Group. Th Annual expected generation of the plant is 104 gigawatt-hours (370 TJ).

== See also ==
- List of power stations in Uganda
- List of hydropower stations in Africa
- List of hydroelectric power stations
