= William Unek =

Ugandan serial mass murderer (died 1957)

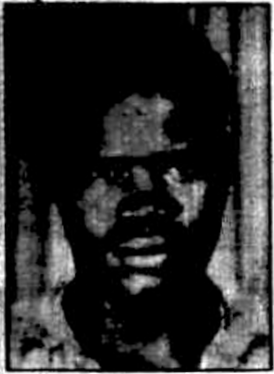
- Post-1954 photo used during the Tanganyika manhunt
- Born: Adrogo; Okoro County, West Nile District, Protectorate of Uganda
- Died: 20 February 1957; Mwanza, Tanganyika Territory
- Cause of death: Gunshot wound
- Other names: William s/o Unek; William Onek; William Uneko
- Occupation: Police constable
- Criminal charge: Murder
- Wanted by: Belgian Congo

Details
- Date: February 1954 or mid-1955 11–16 February 1957
- Country: Belgian Congo; Tanganyika Territory
- States: Orientale Province (Congo); Lake Province (Tanganyika)
- Killed: 58
- Injured: 32+
- Weapons: Machete (Congo); Axe, .303 British rifle, arson (Tanganyika)
- Date apprehended: 19 February 1957

William Unek (died 20 February 1957) was a Ugandan serial mass murderer who killed a total of 58 people in two separate spree killings in the Belgian Congo (modern-day Democratic Republic of Congo) and Tanganyika Territory (modern-day Tanzania) during the mid-1950s.

While living in the Congo, William murdered 22 of his relatives in a mass stabbing in Mahagi territory during a family reunion, apparently believing they were responsible for sabotaging his marriage using witchcraft. Though wanted as a fugitive by Belgian authorities, he had managed to flee the country for Tanganyika, where he took a new identity and became a police constable under the British administration.

After around two years, William, suspecting his new spouse was having an affair with his boss, targeted numerous places in and around his new home in Malampaka village in a mass shooting and axe attack, killing 36 people. Following a nine-day manhunt, William was fatally wounded during his capture. His true identity and connection to the earlier murders in the Congo were discovered a month later.

== Background ==
According to the East African Standard, William Unek's name is composed of a given name (William) and his father's name (Unek) as a patronymic. As such, he was typically referred to only by his first name, including in formal settings, i.e. "Constable William" rather than "Constable Unek". Reports on the 1957 manhunt described William as a "Uganda man", with the East African Standard identifying him as an ethnic Acholi, which was repeated in later publishings by The Times.

A joint investigation between Congolese and Ugandan authorities determined that William Unek was an alias and while he was of Ugandan origin, "William" was born Adrogo s/o Urwinyo, an Alur of the Jahoulur chiefdom in Okoro County, West Nile District. The Alur kingdom, which is located in an area spanning the northeastern Congo and northwestern Uganda, had an arrangement with colonial authorities that allowed the Alur a degree of autonomy, including self-regulated border crossings through individual chiefdoms.

== Mahagi killings ==
On a Saturday night in either February 1954 or mid-1955, Adrogo had invited 22 family members to a banquet on the occasion of an indigenous festival, taking place at his home in Angala village, part of Angal chiefdom in Mahagi territory, located near the northern Congo–Uganda border. After the celebration, 20 of the relatives went to sleep while two children went outside to play. Adrogo then used a machete (commonly misreported as an axe) to kill each of the sleeping guests. He then set the home on fire and fled, encountering the two children on their way back in the neighbourhood and murdering them as well. Enabled through the late hours on a weekend day, he obtained a boat at Lake Albert to cross back into his native Uganda.

Despite an extensive search and numerous inquiries by Congo authorities to the Ugandan administration, the fugitive was never found. The killings notably caused shock with both the native and the colonial population.

=== Victims and motive ===
The 22 victims were all related to the perpetrator, although English sources only reported 21.

According to Belgian Congo authorities, Adrogo had blamed close relatives for infertility during his second marriage, accusing them of "hexes". He was described as showing signs of neurasthenia, a broad and obsolete medical term characterised by physical and mental fatigue.

=== Escape to Tanganyika ===
Adrogo eventually ended up in the Tanganyika Territory, where he gave the false identity of William Unek and claimed to be Acholi, another Luo people native to northern Uganda. The Acholi were regarded as a "martial race" by the British for their reputation as fighters and thus commonly assigned to military duty under colonial authorities. At the time, the vast majority of African law enforcement members in Tanganyika were Luo, whose languages, including those of the Alur and Acholi, are largely mutually intelligible. By 1956, William had joined the Tanganyika Police Force, who were unaware of his criminal past. He was serving as an askari and held the lowest rank as constable. While it was known that William was from Uganda, no further background check had been performed on his entry into the territory.

In August 1956, William was stationed to Lake Province, residing and working in Malampaka, a village in the province's Maswa District (in a part of the modern-day Simiyu Region). Malampaka is part of Sukumaland and located roughly halfway between the cities of Shinyanga and Mwanza, about 40 miles (64 km) southeast of the latter. William, along with his concubine Angelina (commonly misrepresented as his wife in international media), lived behind the police post, where the homes of other askari were located. William was described as "always quiet and reserved".

William spent most of the day before the attack at a pombe club and an Indian-run bar, which was considered outside of his usual behaviour.

== Malampaka killings ==
=== Police outpost ===
On the night of 10–11 February 1957, William committed a second spree killing. Just after midnight, William came into work at the Malampaka police post, located outside of the main residential area. He asked two superior officers, Sergeant Clement and Corporal Opiyo, to accompany him into town, asking them to help in the arrest of "a man who had several diamonds". The officers walked outside in single file fashion with Clement at the front and William in the back. During the trek into town, William struck Opiyo in the back of the head, causing the latter to lose consciousness for about 15 minutes. Upon awakening, Opiyo found Clement and William gone. Opiyo headed back towards the post to get other askaris to aid in search of both of the missing men. Opiyo and his colleagues then heard gunshots near Malampaka's Central Line railway station, where they found two dead men, whom Opiyo identified as the native assistant station master and a labourer. Senior Inspector M. C. Desai later found Clement's body in a hedge around 0.25 miles (400 m) from the police post. Both Clement and Opiyo had been attacked with an axe.

After attacking Opiyo, William had broken into the police armoury, using the axe to break the door open. A Sikh contractor, Ragbir Singh Lamba, later found the armoury door forced open, with the bloodied axe lying nearby, as well as six rifles and 50 rounds of .303 ammunition missing. In a house behind the armoury, Sgt. Clement's son was found wounded by a gunshot; the boy died despite first aid. A fire had been set in the adjoining hut where William and his concubine lived and inside, the burned bodies of two women and a child were recovered. At Opiyo's residence, the corporal's wife and three children were found shot dead. Shortly after 8:00 a.m., police heard three gunshots at the Malya road and found three dead men at the scene.

=== Town proper ===
According to a witness, after William entered town, he "seemed to just shoot anybody who crossed his path". Investigators assumed that William had snuck up on most of the victims as the majority had been shot at a close distance. He shot various people outside and some employees at a local business, reportedly burning down a second hut before fleeing. The killings took place over the course of less than twelve hours.

Immediate reports counted nine dead and nine wounded at the scene. The same afternoon, the motorized sections of Mwanza Police, led by the Assistant Commissioner of Police Lake Province, started the search for William in the area near Malya. The death toll rose to 16 the following day, with unconfirmed reports of 32 injured.

=== Surrounding area ===
On the night of 12 February, William also strangled a 15-year-old girl, marking the 32nd fatality per official announcement on 13 February. Between 14 and 16 February, William attacked several isolated homes surrounding Malampaka. Police determined that William ambushed the occupants and would steal their clothes and food before setting the huts and outbuildings on fire and fleeing again. In these attacks, four people were killed by gunshots or slashes, bringing the final fatality count to 36. The search was now considered significantly more difficult as this also meant that William had discarded his identifiable constable uniform.

=== Victims ===
31 people were killed in Malampaka, with eleven of the victims killed in close vicinity of the police post. Around 30 others were injured. Five more people were killed in the countryside surrounding Malampaka during the manhunt. In total, William had shot dead ten men, eight women, and eight children, murdered five men with an axe, stabbed another one, strangled a teenage girl, and burned two women and a child. The coroner's statement initially reported the number of people killed by William to 37, but this was returned to the original count less than two weeks later. They were members of the Sukuma people.

William's concubine Angelina was reportedly one of those killed, having reportedly been murdered before their house was set on fire. However, as of the coroner's opinion in March, police were still in the process of tracking her movements and whereabouts. It was initially claimed that Sgt. Clement's wife Paulino was amongst the victims, apparently killed with the same axe as her husband, and that William stole the key to the armoury from her, though she was later named as a witness to the coroner's opinion. Similarly, Cpl. Opiyo was also described as a fatality before his account of the killings was published in the media.

=== Motive ===
On 15 February, during the manhunt, speculation suggested that William "may have gone berserk from taking drugs". According to William's later testimony, he had developed a one-sided rivalry with his superior officer Clement, whom he accused of having an affair with William's concubine Angelina. While this could not be proven, reconstruction by investigators showed that Angelina had travelled to Shinyanga on 9 February via train. William reasoned that he killed the remaining victims because they were "spying" on him. Oral tradition passed down in the Kwimba District reflected this as stating that William had been motivated by "social misunderstandings with his boss".

== Manhunt ==
For nine days, the bush and swamp area in the districts of Maswa, Kishapu, and Kwimba, covering several hundred square miles, was searched by 3,000 Wasukuma tribesmen and 200 officers of Tanganyika police. A single spotter plane cooperated with Mwanza Police on the second day of the search. By 14 February, police reinforcements had come in from Tabora. The following day, military aid was invoked and a King's African Rifles company, numbering over 100 soldiers were sent over from Tabora via train, making the search for William Unek Tanganyika's greatest manhunt up to that time. By 18 February, the search force was 4,000 in total. British authorities posted a reward of £125 (US$350; equivalent to £2,618 in 2025) for William's capture and deployed additional jeeps and aircraft to aid in the search.

On 12 February, traces of William were reported at an outcrop near Malya, about 12 miles (19 km) north of Malampaka. On the morning of 13 February, a man of William's description was allegedly seen at the railway line near Malampaka, with another sighting in the late afternoon near the railway station of Seke, about 14 mi (23 km) south of Malampaka, still carrying a rifle. By 16 February, searches focused on the Basuli area, but none of the sightings past 12 February could be confirmed. It's presumed that William hid out and slept on kopjes while on the run. The latest lead before the capture were shoe imprints of rubber sole boots found in the bushland. His name was not mentioned in reports until 19 February.

While William was easily recognisable from his 6 ft stature, the high grass provided cover from his pursuers. Trackers dogs were used, but their effectiveness was lessened due to heavy rainfall. Tribal members suggested looking for signs of vultures to locate William as they believed it likely that he had died by this point, either of exhaustion or by suicide. Pastoralists and farmers in the area refrained from working outside during this time due to fears of attack from the fugitive. Natives barred their houses and cattle pens for protection and only travelled around armed with spears and bows, with security conditions described as at their worst since the Maasai cattle raids 50 years earlier. Residents of Malampaka chose to live together in a communal encampment to ensure each other's safety until William was either confirmed dead or captured due to concerns over another potential attack.

=== Capture and death ===
On 18 February 1957, William went to the house of 45-year-old Iyumbu Ikumbu (also named as Iyumbu bin Ikumbi), a peasant of Masanga in Mataba, only 2 miles (3.2 km) outside of Malampaka, in search of food. Iyumbu reported the incident to the police; he was asked to notify them and keep William with him should the fugitive come again to his home. William, still armed, reappeared at about 1:00 a.m. the next day. Iyumbu sent out his wife, telling William she was getting a chicken to eat, but in reality, she was alerting the local tribal headman. Iyumbu distracted William until police arrival by engaging him in conversation for nearly two hours.

Shortly after 2:00 a.m. a colonial police company arrived from Mwanza after driving 1.5 miles (2.4 km) off the Malampaka-Malya roadway. The troop was led by Superintendent A. J. Press, commanding a unit of motorized officers that included Assistant Superintendents D. J. G. Fraser and Alec W. C. Culbert. After being informed by Iyumbu's wife, native authorities had already dispatched tribal soldiers to surround the house. Iyumbu ran out while the Mwanza police repeatedly ordered William to surrender, threatening to bomb the building otherwise. William refused to respond, at which point Supt. Press threw a single tear gas bomb at the doorway, which bounced off the building and detonated. Press then walked up to the house, took out a second smoke bomb, and slid it through an opening between the roof and wall. After some time, this caused the house to catch fire, with William fleeing the building towards police. Asst. Supt. Culbert and a native policeman ordered William to stop before opening fire on him. William collapsed after being shot once in the abdomen by Culbert, receiving treatment by a doctor in Malampaka.

During questioning, William told Supt. Asst. Fraser how he was motivated by his concubine's apparent infidelity, also asking to be shot while gesturing at his ear. The day of his capture, after being charged with murder and ordered to two weeks of remand, William underwent further treatment at Shinyanga and later emergency surgery at Mwanza Hospital. Although his state was described as "not badly wounded", William's health deteriorated as he recovered from the procedure and he ultimately died of his injuries in the afternoon hours of 20 February. An inquest was ordered, with the coroner, J. A. L. Wiseham, deciding in mid-March 1957 that William's death was a justifiable homicide; Wiseham declined to examine the other deaths because "no benefit would accrue".

== Aftermath ==
=== Domestic ===
Iyumbu's house was destroyed in the fire, but he received the government reward of £125 in March 1957, with plans to buy new cattle. In October 1957, he was given the British Empire Medal by governor Edward Twining for his bravery leading to the capture of the constable. Superintendent Press was also praised for acting "in utter disregard for his own life" by planting the explosive that flushed out William Unek.

William was connected to the Mahagi killings in late March 1957, when the Jahoulur chief of Okoro County was informed that a friend of the fugitive Adrogo had received photographs by mail on 20 March, depicting Adrogo wearing a Tanganyikan police uniform. In the letter, Adrogo wrote about his new employment, claiming to work in Kenya, and that he was in good health, adding that he was "waiting for the first opportunity to settle the accounts" with his surviving family members who had not attended the banquet years earlier. Furthermore, the letter was posted on 10 February in Malampaka. The chief contacted Ugandan Police who relayed the photos to the Belgian Congo, where Mahagi police also positively identified him. This information was announced by police in Kampala on 27 March, whereupon it was published the following day, while Ugandan authorities were still in the process of matching their findings with Tanganyika.

While there were previous incidents in which native police officers committed murders or other violent crimes, the killings by William stood out due to the high death toll. In September 1957, native police constable Olaa threatened several villagers at Nyanzenda, pointing a rifle at them and saying he was "the new Constable William". Three Mwanza policemen apprehended Olaa inside his post, after which he was judged mentally unstable and faced discharge from police duty.

In April 1957, a local leader of Maswa District, Chief Majebere, opened a fund to aid relatives of the victims, with the Tanganyika government contributing £500 (equivalent to £10,472 in 2025). In 1958, a maternity clinic was built in the district, paid for with public donations, as a memorial for William's victims.

=== International ===
The spree killing in Malampaka ranks amongst the deadliest of the twentieth century. After William Unek was connected to the Mahagi killings, several English-language newspapers presented William Unek as the world's most prolific murderer for having killed 57 people, the number of victims reported by Reuters. It was considered the deadliest mass shooting in recorded history until the 1982 Woo Bum-kon incident.

Since the 2010s, William Unek has occasionally been mentioned in the context of mass shootings in the United States as an example that such acts of violence are neither a modern trend or unique to the US.

Following the 2012 Sandy Hook Elementary School shooting in the United States, the Hartford Courant noted that gunman Adam Lanza, who had a preoccupation with mass killings and their perpetrators, listed William Unek and Woo Bum-kon as the most prolific murderers out of a 400-person ranking he kept in his personal documents.

== See also ==
- List of rampage killers in Africa
