= Arua nightclub shooting =

Mass shooting in Uganda

- Arua (Uganda)
- Location: Paradise Nightclub, Arua, Uganda
- Date: 28 September 2006; 4:15 a.m. (EAT)
- Target: Soldiers and nightclub patrons
- Attack type: Mass shooting
- Weapon: Firearm
- Deaths: 4 (including the perpetrator)
- Injuries: 4
- Perpetrator: Andrew Wanyama
- Motive: Quarrel over a call girl

The Arua nightclub shooting was a mass shooting that occurred on 28 September 2006, when Uganda People's Defence Force (UPDF) soldier Andrew Wanyama shot seven people at the Paradise Nightclub in Arua, Uganda, killing three and wounding four others. He fled and was killed the following afternoon by soldiers and police officers after he opened fire on them.

== Shooting ==
At 4:13 a.m. on 28 September 2006, Andrew Wanyama, a private from the 409th UPDF Brigade in Arua, opened fire on patrons at the Paradise Nightclub. Two people died at the entrance of the dance hall, another died from bleeding at Kuluva Hospital, and four others were seriously injured. Two of those killed were fellow UPDF soldiers: Corporal Eric Byaruhanga and Private Musubuka. The shooting stemmed from a quarrel between Wanyama and his colleagues over a call girl, although it's unknown why he also shot people unrelated to the dispute.

Wanyama fled after the shooting and hid in a mango tree. A joint military-police squad found him that afternoon and ordered him to surrender. In response, he opened fire on the squad, leading them to shoot and kill him.

After the shooting, numerous local leaders, including Charles Asiki, the mayor of Arua District, called for an immediate shut down of Paradise Nightclub due to its negative reputation. Police had repeatedly raided the nightclub because it was a notorious hangout spot for local criminals.

== Victims ==
Killed:

- Corporal Eric Byaruhanga
- Private Musubuka
- Unnamed man

Injured:

- Private Juma Seiko Masaba
- Private Edward Akandwanaho
- Bosco Atiku
- "Grace"

== See also ==
- List of rampage killers in Africa
- List of massacres in Uganda
- Bombo shooting
