= Ganyenda =

Parish in Kamwenge, Uganda

Ganyenda is a parish found in Kamwenge Sub County, Kamwenge District . It is predominantly a rural parish with Ganyenda Trading Centre as the main urban area. The main villages of Ganyenda are Kinoni 1, Kinoni 2, Ganyenda1, Ganyenda 2 and Rwengobe.

== See also ==
1 Nkongoro; a parish in Kamwenge.

2 Kyabandara, another parish in Kamwenge Subcounty.
