= Stephen Chance =

Stephen Chance may refer to:

- Stephen Chance (actor), British actor who plays Nimrod (Doctor Who)
- Philip Turner (writer) used the pseudonym when writing children's mystery novels about the Reverend Septimus Treloar
- Stephen Chance, victim of Kamwenge Trading Centre shooting
- Steve Chance, fictional character in Cuckoo (TV series)
