= Kahunge =

- Town Council
- Map of Uganda showing the location of Kahunge Town Council
- Coordinates: 00°19′29.136″N 30°26′49.812″E
- Country: Uganda
- Region: Western Region of Uganda
- District: Kamwenge District
- County: Kibale County
- Time zone: UTC+3 (EAT)

Kahunge is a town council in Kamwenge District of the Western Region of Uganda.

== Location ==
Kahunge Town Council is found in Kibale County, Kamwenge District in the Western Region of Uganda. The town is located along Kamwenge-Fort Portal Highway, around 50 kilometres (31 mi) from Kamwenge and around 60 kilometres (37 mi) from Fort Portal by road.

== Overview ==
The town was promoted to town council status by the District Council of Kamwenge District in 2017, and it became functional in 2018.

Kahunge is a busy trading centre and there is a motor stage for the vehicles plying Kamwenge-Fort Portal highway.

People in rural Kahunge grow pineapples, maize, beans and coffee as major cash crops. There is also dairy farming at a small scale.

== Points of interest ==
The following points of interest lie within the town or near its boundaries.

- Nyakahita-Kazo-Kamwenge-Fort Portal Road, a 208 kilometres (129 mi) road, passes through the town.
- Kyabenda Senior Secondary School, one of the oldest secondary schools in Kamwenge District, is found within the town.
- St. Michael's Secondary School, a Catholic-founded school
- Kahunge Community Health Unit, an Anglican Church-founded health facility
