= Kabujogera =

Ugandan town

- Location in Uganda; Placement on map is approximate
- Coordinates: 00°05′43″S 30°23′49″E
- Country: Uganda
- Region: Western Uganda
- District: Kitagwenda District
- Municipality: Kabujogera
- County: Kitagwenda
- Elevation: 4,200 ft (1,280 m)

Kabujogera is a settlement in Kitagwenda District, in Western Uganda. It is one of the two municipalities in the newly created Kitagwenda District, the other being Ntara Town Council, where the district headquarters are located.

== Location ==
Kabujogera is located approximately 20 kilometres (12 mi) southeast of Ntara, the location of the district headquarters. This is approximately 109 kilometres (68 mi), south of Fort Portal, the nearest large city. Kabujogera is located approximately 320 kilometres (199 mi) west of Kampala, Uganda's capital and largest city. The geographical coordinates of Kabujogera are: 0°05'43.0"S, 30°23'49.0"E (Latitude:-0.095278; Longitude:30.396944).

== Overview ==
The town of Kabujogera is one of the two municipalities in Kitagwenda District. The other is the larger Ntara Municipality, which serves as the district headquarters.

== Economic activities ==
The economy's mainstay are agriculture and fishing. The crops raised include:

- Sorghum
- Maize
- Millet
- Peas
- Groundnuts
- Sunflower
- Sweet potatoes
- Beans
- Tea
- Coffee
- Cotton
- Tomatoes
- Cabbage
- Onions
- Pineapples

== See also ==
- Toro sub-region
- Kitagwenda District
- Western Region, Uganda
