= Abnub shooting =

2026 mass murder in Egypt

- Location: Abnub, Asyut Governorate, Egypt
- Date: 18 May 2026
- Attack type: Mass shooting, drive-by shooting, vehicle-ramming attack
- Weapon: AK-74 assault rifle
- Deaths: 9 (including the perpetrator)
- Injuries: 6 (5 by gunfire, 1 by ramming)
- Perpetrator: Atef Kh.
- Motive: Perpetrator's psychiatric disorders

On 18 May 2026, a mass shooting occurred in Abnub (Arabic: أبنوب), a city located in the Asyut Governorate in southern Egypt. The attack resulted in the deaths of eight people and left six others injured.

== Shooting ==
According to Egypt's Interior Ministry, the suspect, identified as Atef Kh., 48, was reportedly driving a Jeep when he collided with a motorcycle, injuring the rider. Following the collision, he allegedly opened fire at a crowded transportation hub, resulting in the deaths of eight people, including children, and the injuries of five others.

Following the shooting, security forces tracked the suspect to agricultural land right outside Abnub. The suspect engaged in a shootout with officers and was ultimately killed by security forces.

While the precise motivation remains under investigation, the Interior Ministry confirmed that the suspect had a documented history of mental health issues and had previously undergone treatment at a psychiatric hospital in Cairo.

== See also ==
- Meet al-Attar shooting
