= List of massacres in Uganda =

This is a list of massacres that have taken place in Uganda in chronological order.

== List of massacres ==
Name	Date	Location	Deaths	Description
Series of barrack massacres	May to July 1971	Uganda	Estimated 5,000–6,000 military force killed	Related massacres in: Mbarara (~150–250 killed), Moroto (~120 killed), Jinja (~800 killed or disappeared), and Magamaga Ordnance Depot (~50 killed)
Southern Uganda massacres	1972	Uganda	150 Ugandan civilians killed in combat; hundreds executed afterwards; 9–20 Tanzanian civilians killed	Ugandan insurgents armed attempt to overthrow the regime of Idi Amin
Massacred soldiers	1978	Uganda	120 dead bodies discovered	Ugandan bodies discovered at Uganda-Tanzania border. The Government of Tanzania stated that bodies of the soldiers "dumped" in Tanzania after executed in Uganda
	June 1980	Rubaga	13	Army killed 13 people on eve of Yusuf Lule's expected popular return.
	June/July 1980	Kattambwa, Entebbe Road	43	43 dead bodies were dumped by UNLA lorries at Busabala & Kattambwa.
	July/August 1980	Rubaga Road, near Lohana Club	4	4 civilians ordered to stand out from the crowd & shot at orders of Bazilio Olara Okello.
	September/October 1980	Natete	4 or more	Four were known to have been killed by army men.
	January 1981	Wakiso	4	Forced to drink poison.
	5 January 1981	Wakiso	16	
	January 1981	Matugga	32	
	January 1981	Migadde	33	
	February 1981	Kibibi (Mpigi Dist.)	16	
	February 1981	Bakuli-Mengo	14	Soldiers raided Mengo Bukuli, rounded up many people and killed them.
	February 1981	Bakuli-Mengo	7	Seven bullet riddled bodies dumped in Namanve forest, Jinja road.
	February 1981	Kiboga Area	20	UNLA troops raided Kiboga area and killed off 20 civilians as scapegoats for guerrilla attacks.
	March 1981	Namanve Forest	79	79 bullet riddled bodies found; 2 belonging to school girls in uniform. Evidence of rape present.
	March 1981	Katabi Barracks	70	Prisoners killed in the barracks by soldiers.
	April 1981	Ndeeba	15	An army Land Rover overturned in Ndeeba town. Soldiers from Malire barracks descended on the town and killed 15 people.
	April 1981	Mukono area	16	Soldiers descended on Mukono area after a guerrilla attack and killed civilians as scapegoats.
	May 1981	Namayumba (Luwero Dist.)	4	
	May 1981	Namayumba (Luwero Dist.)	3	
	May 1981	Kireka	3	Three people were shot dead at Kireka roadblock because they had no money to give to soldiers.
	May 1981	Kawanda	6	A family of 6 wiped out by UNLA soldiers.
	May 1981	Jinja	5	Soldiers shot 5 school boys in Jinja town.
	May 1981	Mukono	25	Soldiers again raided Mukono area and shot 25 people.
	May 1981	Kiboga	250	Claiming that Kiboga protected guerrillas, soldiers shot over 250 people.
	June 1981	Kikandwa	11	Soldiers massacred 11 people in their homes.
	June 1981	Nakaseke Bulemezi	8	
Ombaci Massacre	24 June 1981	Ombaci, Arua, Northern Region	80 to 97	UNLA soldiers arrived at the Ombaci Catholic Mission and adjoining secondary school. They began to indiscriminately kill civilians, women, children and the elderly; by shooting, bludgeoning, stabbing, lancing, stomping, kicking and exploding ordinance
	June 1981	Ombaci and Ladonga	10	Soldiers opened fire at innocent civilians and refugees at the Catholic mission, because of allegations that they had hospitalized and treated a guerrilla. This incident was mentioned by the UN Secretary General at the Nairobi OAU Conference.
	July 1981	Lungujja	8	Soldiers killed 8 people at Lungujja village, near Kampala.
	July 1981	Kampala	3	Soldiers entered the Sardinia Pub in Kampala, opening fire on innocent civilians.
	July 1981	Namayumba (Luwero Dist.)	6	
	1 August 1981	Naziri on Mityana Road	7	House of John Mugwanya, heir to Stanslaus Mugwanya, destroyed by RGP and seven people killed. His soap factory was also destroyed.
	August 1981	Mukono	35	They were killed by soldiers.
	August 1981	Mityana	33	They were killed by UNI A soldiers.
	August 1981	Mityana	9	Nine people were murdered by men in military Rayon uniform at Kawempe Rayon Textiles.
	September 1981	Wakiso (Mpigi)	60	60 people including women and children were killed in a UNLA raid on their district villages.
	September 1981	Matugga	30	UNLA raided, looted and shot 30 people.
	September 1981	Kapeeka (Bulemezi)	7	Seven civilians were killed in their homes by government troops.
	October 1981	Karenge	9	
	October 1981	Kissuuna (Luwero Dist.)	4	
	October 1981	Ndeeba	30	
	October 1981	Kasese	162	Uganda Digest of Dec. 1981, p. 63, reported 162 people killed by government troops in Kasese District.
	November 1981	Luwero	51	51 innocent civilians were killed in their homes when UNLA raided the area.
	December 1981	Gombe-Kalasa (Mpigi Dist.)	3	Three worshippers killed when soldiers opened fire in a church.
	23 February 1982	Mpigi roadblock	50+	More than fifty people were shot at Mpigi roadblock.
	23-24 February 1982	Rubaga, Ndeeba, Mutundwe, Nalukolongo, area of Kampala	200+	Over 200 civilians were killed by Kabowa, UNLA soldiers on a rampage after a UFM attack on Malire barracks.
	27 February 1982	Mpigi roadblock	19	Another 19 people were killed on Mpigi roadblock by soldiers.
	24-29 February 1982	Bujuuko, Muduuma and Nswanjere (Mpigi Dist.)	50+	In the hunt for guerrillas, soldiers carried out a scorched-earth raid on these villages killing people, dogs, chickens and anything they found alive.
	March 1982	Kakikiri-Sentema area	20	UNIA soldiers raided and killed villagers.
	March 1982	Kawanda Research Station	16	Civilians shot by soldiers.
	March 1982	Green Bar on Entebbe Road	11	Shot by soldiers.
	April 1982	Mende	60	Civilians killed by soldiers.
	April 1982	Mutugga Bombo Rd	30	Soldiers killed people; some of the dead were from Kawanda Research Station.
	April 1982	Kakengere	12	
	April 1982	Kakiri	55	Soldiers accused the people of Kakiri of possessing pieces of wood and grass for superstition purposes.
	May 1982	Lake Victoria	30	Thirty bodies washed upon the shores of Lake Victoria.
	May 1982	Kikyusa	100	These people were hacked to death by soldiers.
	28 May 1982	Nakaseta, near Nityana	35	
Kampala wedding massacre	26 June 1994	Naguru, Kampala	27 killed, 13 injured	Richard Komakech, shot and killed people at wedding party. He was apprehended and killed.
Kamwenge Trading Centre shooting	26 December 1994	Kamwenge	13 killed, 14 injured	Police constable Alfred Ogwang shot and killed people in a disco at Kamwenge Trading Centre
Kichwamba massacre	8 June 1998	Kichwamba, Kabarole District	At least 80	Armed group affiliates with Allied Democratic Front (ADF) attacked the Kichwamba Technical Institute set three dormitories on fire killing students.
Uganda cult massacres	17 March 2000	Kanungu District	778	
Lukodi Massacre	19 May 2004	Gulu district of the Acholi sub-region, Lukodi Village	60-70	Lord’s Resistance Army (LRA) rebels attacked the village of Lukodi. The case was later used in Dominic Onwgen's trial by the ICC.
Arua nightclub shooting	28 September 2006	Paradise Nightclub, Arua	4 (including the perpetrator)	The Uganda People's Defence Force (UPDF) soldier Andrew Wanyama shot seven people at the Paradise Nightclub in Arua, killing three and wounding four others. He fled and was killed the following afternoon by soldiers and police officers after he opened fire on them
2010 Kampala bombings	11 July 2010	Kampala	74	suicide bombings were carried out against crowds watching a screening of 2010 FIFA World Cup Final match during the World Cup at two locations in Kampala. The attacks left 74 dead and 70 injured. Islamist al-Shabbab claimed responsibility for the attacks as retaliation for Ugandan support for AMISOM.
Bombo shooting	9 March 2013	Bombo,	10 killed, 3 injured	Patrick Okot Odoch, who was a member of Uganda People's Defence Force shot and killed 9 people in a bar and, the tenth victim while fleeing.
	12 April 2014	Ntoroko	10 killed, 25 injured	After having a fight in a bar over a woman, Private Chris Amanyire returned with a firearm and opened fire before committing suicide.
Kasese clashes	26–27 November 2016	Kasese	87 killed, 180+ arrested, 167 surrendered	Ugandan police killed the Rwenzururian royal guards and policemen.
2021 Uganda bombings	23 October – 16 November 2021	Kampala (first and fourth attacks), Mpigi District (second attack), Nakaseke District (third attack)	11 (including four perpetrators)	
Mpondwe school massacre	16 June 2023	Mpondwe Lhubiriha Secondary School, Mpondwe, Kasese District	42 killed, 8 injured	Rebels of the Allied Democratic Forces (ADF), a jihadist group speculatively linked by analysts to the Islamic State, attacked a secondary school in Mpondwe, a town in western Uganda's Kasese District on the border with the Democratic Republic of the Congo. 42 people were killed, including 38 students; 8 were injured.
Kagadi massacre	29 October 2024	Mizizi A Village, Kyaterekera sub-county in Kagadi District	10 (including 2 perpetrators)	Adults and children were killed after they refused to join a new religious group.

== Gallery ==
Location of Uganda

Cities in Uganda

== See also ==
- Attacks on humanitarian workers
