= Mpanga =

- Map of Uganda showing the location of Mpanga.
- Coordinates: 00°04′52″N 30°22′52″E
- Country: Uganda
- Region: Western Uganda
- Sub-region: Toro sub-region
- District: Kitagwenda District
- Elevation: 1,000 m (3,300 ft)
- Time zone: UTC+3 (EAT)

Mpanga is a location on River Mpanga in Kitagwenda county, Kitagwenda District in Western Uganda.

== Location ==
Mpanga is located in Kitagwenda District, in the Western Region of Uganda, adjacent to where River Mpanga empties into Lake George. This location is approximately 18 kilometres (11 mi), by road, southwest of Kamwenge, the nearest town and location of the district headquarters. and approximately 300 kilometres (190 mi), by road, west of Kampala, the capital and largest city of Uganda. Mpanga is also the location of Mpanga Power Station, an 18 megawatt hydropower project in Uganda, constructed between 2008 and 2011. Mpanga Power Station was commissioned on 10 February 2011.

== Landmarks ==
The landmarks at or near Mpanga include:

- Mpanga Power Station - An 18 MW hydroelectric power plant across River Mpanga
- Lake George - An inland crater lake that lies entirely in Uganda within Queen Elizabeth National Park
- Mpanga Forest - A National Forest Reserve
- Queen Elizabeth National Park (QENP) - Lying within neighboring Kasese District and Rubirizi District, QENP is the most visited national park in Uganda.

== See also ==
- Toro sub-region
- Kitagwenda District
- Western Region, Uganda
