= Abigaba Cuthbert Mirembe =

Ugandan politician

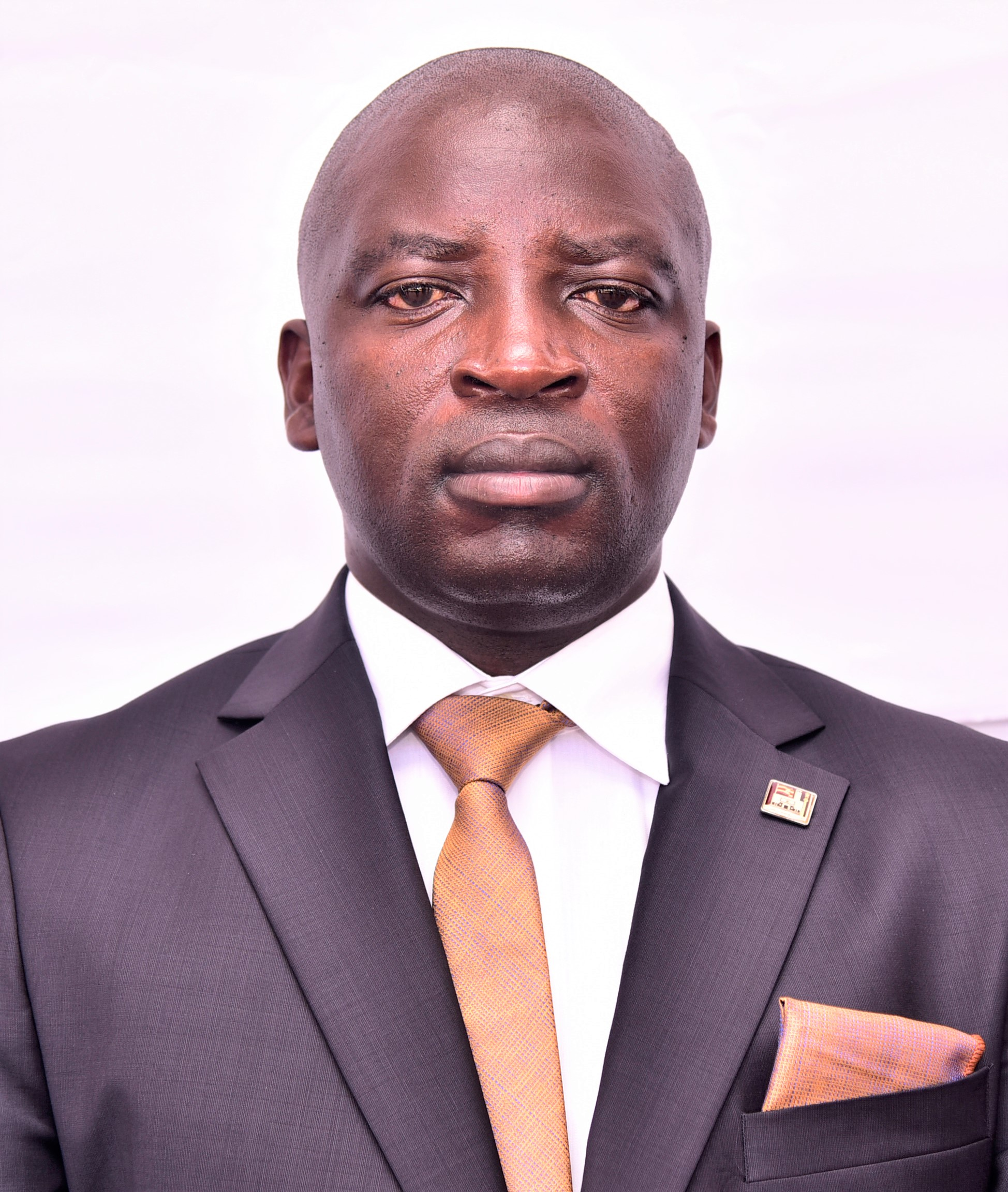
- Abigaba Cuthbert Mirembe in 2026.

Member of the Uganda Parliament for Kibale County
- Incumbent
- Assumed office 2014

Personal details
- Born: May 24, 1977 (age 49) Kabale
- Citizenship: Uganda
- Party: National Resistance Movement
- Spouse: Doreen Abigaba
- Education: Makerere University; University of Kiel
- Known for: Politics and Engineering

Abigaba Cuthbert Mirembe (born 24 May 1977) is a Ugandan politician and engineer. He represents Kibale County, Kamwenge District in the parliament of Uganda. He was elected on the ticket of the National Resistance Movement in 2012.

In the eleventh parliament, he served on the Committee on Education and Sports.

Abigaba Cuthbert Mirembe was reelected to represent the people of Kibale County in Kamwenge district in the 12th parliament of Uganda following the January 2026 general elections in which he was elected on the National Resistance Movement (NRM), beating Brig Gen. Charles Kisembo, who stood as independent, having lost the NRM primary elections with a margin of 13,898.

In the 12th parliament, he chairs the parliamentary sectoral Committee on Education and Sports following his appointment on 7–8 July 2026.

He is married to Ms. Doreen Abigaba, co-director of TEXOL Energies Uganda and founder of CADO Petroleum. They have 4 children. His family is known in Kamwenge for contributing to church functions and better education facilities in the area. They are also widely known for their agricultural input in the local coffee industry.

== Early life and education ==
Abigaba Cuthbert Mirembe was born on 24 May 1975 to Charles Mirembe and his wife in Kabale District. His father was a teacher while his mother was a housewife. Hon. Cuthbert Abigaba worked in MTN UGANDA and MTN GUINEA as a senior capital projects manager and an expatriate principal manager in the latter. He holds a BSc in Electrical Engineering, an MSc in Electrical Engineering, both from Makerere University, and an MEng in Electrical and Telecommunications Engineering from the University of Kiel.

== Political career ==
He has served as Kibale County legislator since 2016. He served as the Vice Chairperson of the 11th Parliamentary Committee of Education and Sports. He serves as the Kamwenge District Roads Committee Chairman, overseeing district budgets for road infrastructure. On 7 July 2026, he was appointed Chairperson of the Committee on Education and Sports. He is also the Chairperson of the Toroo Parliamentary Group and NRM Vice Chairman for Kamwenge District. kyambogouniversity</ref> ugandaradionetwork.com
