= Kichwamba massacre =

1998 killing of students in Kabarole, Uganda

- Part of the Allied Democratic Forces insurgency
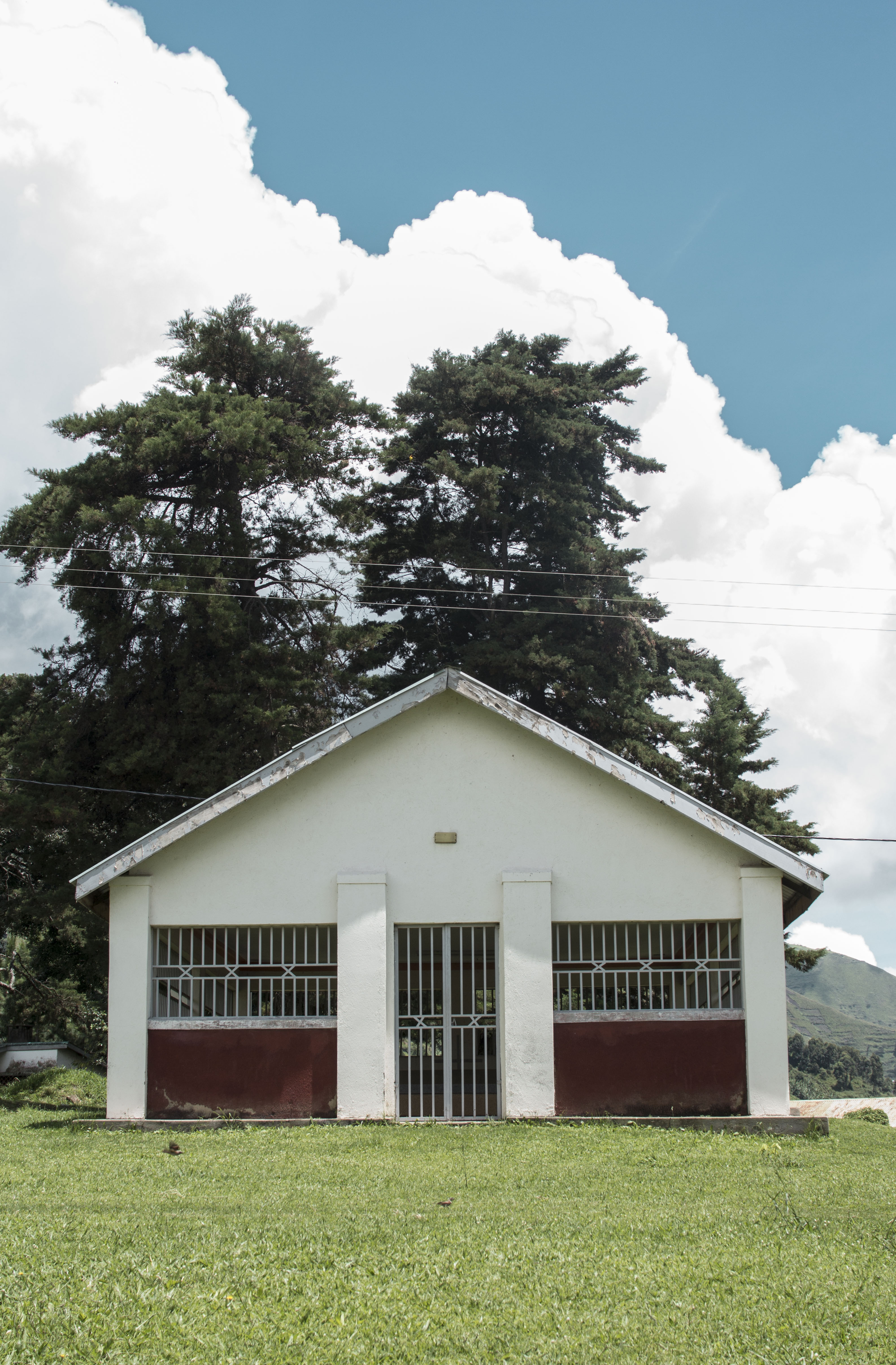

- Kichwamba (Uganda)
- Location: Kichwamba, Kabarole District
- Date: 8 June 1998
- Attack type: Mass execution, arson
- Deaths: At least 80
- Injuries: Unknown
- Victim: Students at the Kichwamba Technical Institute
- Perpetrator: Allied Democratic Forces

On 8 June 1998, rebels affiliated with the Allied Democratic Front (ADF) armed group attacked the Kichwamba Technical Institute in Kabarole, Uganda, and set three dormitories on fire, killing 80 students. The ADF abducted another 100 students and destroyed other property including laboratories and school vehicles.

The rebels locked students in their dormitories and set them on fire. Twenty seven students who were burnt beyond recognition were buried in a mass grave inside the college and the grave bears all their names. some Students escaped and survived the attack.

With the help of the Government of Uganda, the Netherlands Organisation for International Cooperation in Higher Education (Nuffic), Hanze University, Kyambogo University, Mountains of the Moon University and the Government of the Netherlands, the college recovered and, by 2010, had increased its student population to over 650.

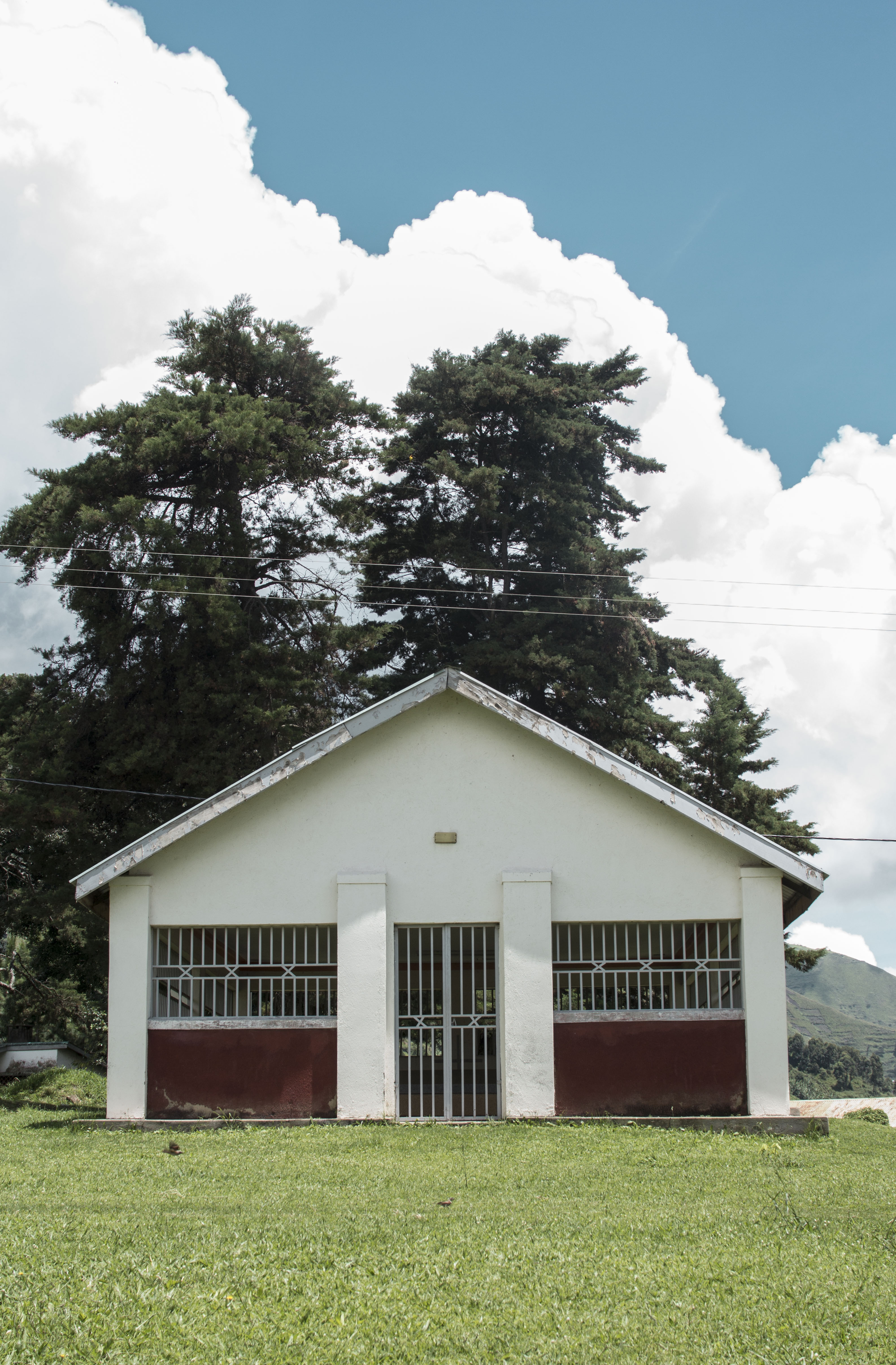

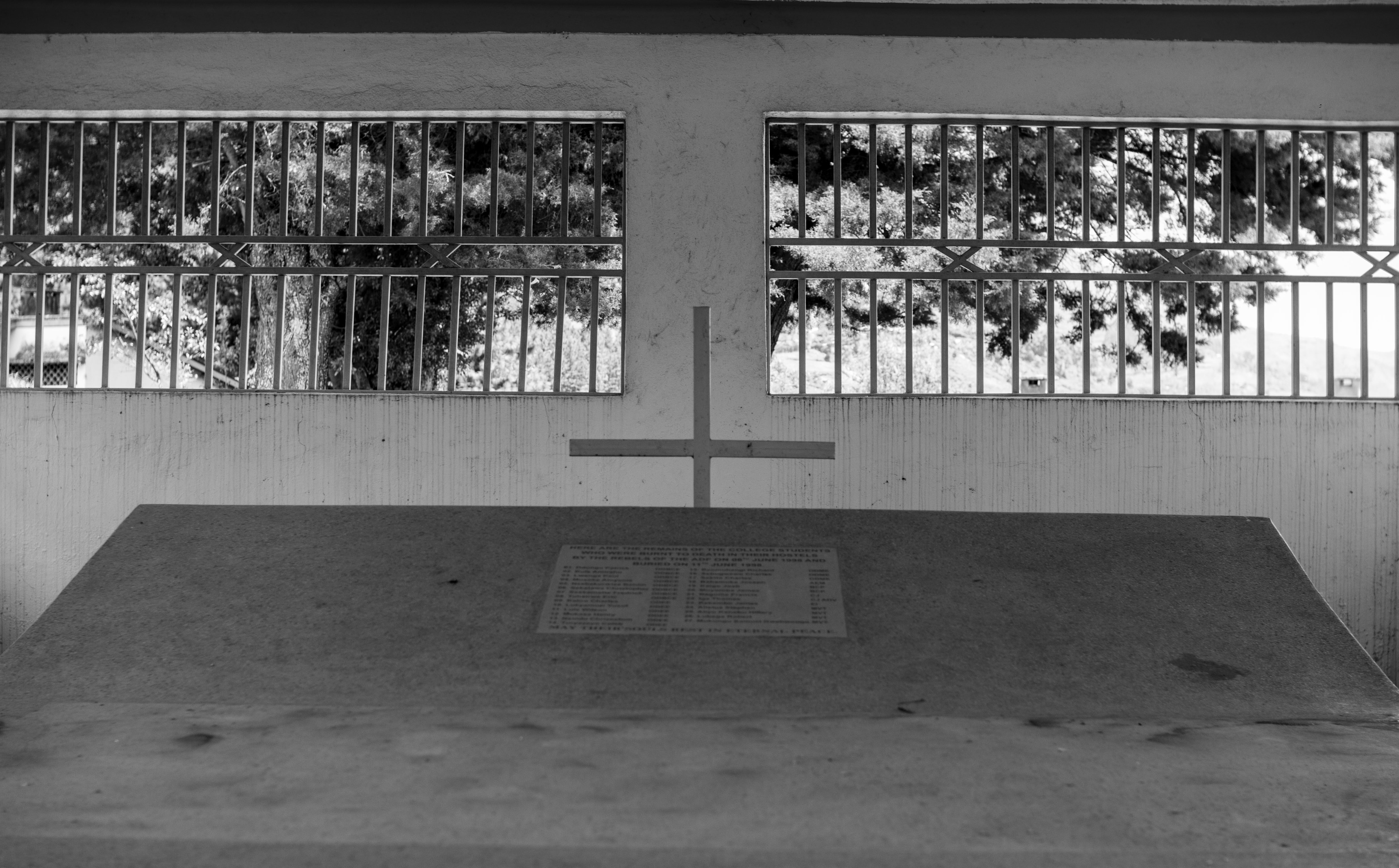

== See also ==
- List of massacres in Uganda
- Human rights in Uganda
