= Nkongoro =

Parish in Kamwenge, Uganda

Nkongoro is a parish in Kamwenge Subcounty, Kamwenge District in western Uganda. It is predominantly a rural area and the main trading centre is Mbonjera trading centre. Its neighbouring parishes are Ganyenda and Kyabandara. It is made up of three villages, namely; Nkongoro, Rwentuha and Kasoga.
