= Kampala wedding massacre =

1994 mass shooting in Kampala, Uganda

- Naguru (Uganda)
- Location: Naguru, Uganda
- Date: 26 June 1994
- Target: Wedding guests
- Attack type: Mass shooting, mass murder
- Weapon: Semi-automatic rifle
- Deaths: 27 (including the perpetrator)
- Injuries: 13
- Perpetrator: Richard Komakech
- Motive: Rejection, alcohol intoxication

On 26 June 1994, a mass shooting took place in the Naguru neighbourhood of Kampala, Uganda. During a wedding party, Uganda People's Defence Force soldier Richard Komakech shot and killed 26 people at the party before being killed by a victim's father during his arrest.

== Massacre ==
Richard Komakech, a private in the Anti-Smuggling Unit of the Ugandan military police, was attending the wedding party in Naguru, apparently drunk, when he requested a dance from Irene Ati, a schoolgirl. Ati declined the offer, but Komakech insisted and attempted to force Ati to dance with him. Komakech behaved increasingly aggressive, for which he was reprimanded, kicked out of the venue, and excluded from further attendance.

Komakech left, but returned around ten minutes later, wielding a loaded semi-automatic rifle. After fatally shooting Irene Ati, Komakech fired into the crowd of dancing couples at random. Ten people, including Ati, were killed instantly while another four died of their injuries at the scene. Twelve more people died at hospitals, bringing the death toll to 26, while thirteen others survived with severe injuries. The majority of victims were teenagers.

Komakech eventually shot himself in the head, but survived with injuries to the forehead, pretending to be dead until police arrival. Officers discovered Komakech alive and initially prevented survivors of the shooting from lynching him. The father of a killed female victim ultimately broke through the police cordon and attacked Komakech, killing him by crushing his skull.

== See also ==
- Bombo shooting
- Kamwenge Trading Centre shooting
- List of massacres in Uganda
