= Kamwenge Trading Centre shooting =

1994 shooting in Kamwenge, Uganda

- Kamwenge (Uganda)
- Location: 0.1836°N 30.4534°E; Kamwenge, Uganda
- Date: 26 December 1994
- Target: Revelers at Kamwenge Trading Centre
- Attack type: Mass murder
- Weapon: Submachine gun
- Deaths: 13
- Injuries: 14
- Perpetrator: Alfred Ogwang

The Kamwenge Trading Centre shooting was a mass murder that occurred in Kamwenge, Uganda on 26 December 1994, when police constable Alfred Ogwang shot at revelers in a disco at Kamwenge Trading Centre, killing 13 people and wounding 14 others. He escaped to Dura afterwards, where he was arrested.

== Shooting ==
On the evening of 25 December 1994, at about 9 p.m., 28-year-old police officer Alfred Ogwang, who was stationed at the Kamwenge Police Post, went to attend a disco dance at the Kamwenge Trading Centre. When he tried to enter the canteen to get some beer at about 11 p.m., he found the door blocked from the inside by several guests. After he was finally let in, he got into an argument with Geofrey Ruhara for this provocation, whereupon all the guests were taken out of the canteen. Outside, Ruhara apologized to Ogwang, who, still angered about the incident, then went home. Upon returning to the barracks he fetched his gun, which was described as an SMG rifle, and made his way back to the Trading Centre.

Just after midnight Ogwang began shooting in the canteen, where he first shot dead Geofrey Ruhara, before killing John Rutaro, Patrick Kugonza, and Stephen Chance. Yelling "I will finish you all!" he then turned his rifle against the crowd in the dancing hall. When the generator was switched off, and the lights went out in the building, Ogwang stopped firing and fled. By then he had killed 13 people and wounded 14 others.

In the morning, at about 7 a.m., he was met at the barracks by Inspector Kisembo, who said he was awakened by some shots. Ogwang aimed his rifle at Kisembo, who managed to wrest it from the gunman's hands after a short struggle. While Kisembo went back to sleep, Ogwang escaped to Dura where he had a brother at an army post. There, he was arrested the next day and brought back to Kamwenge. An examination of his mental state, conducted on 29 December, found him to be sane.

During his trial Ogwang denied having committed the murders, saying that he had handed his rifle to a member of the Local Defence Unit at the entrance of the disco, not knowing what had happened to it afterwards. He also stated that he was too drunk to remember anything that night, and that he only learned about the shooting the next morning, when an angry crowd appeared at the barracks, accusing him of killing people at the disco, though the judge dismissed all of these claims and found him guilty of 13 counts of murder. Ogwang was sentenced to death by hanging, but his sentence was commuted to life imprisonment in 2010.

== See also ==
- Bombo shooting
- Kampala wedding massacre
- List of massacres in Uganda
- Human rights in Uganda
