= Bombo shooting =

2013 Ugandan mass murder

- Bombo (Uganda)
- Location: Bombo, Uganda
- Date: 9 March 2013; 12:12 a.m.
- Attack type: Mass murder
- Weapon: AK-47
- Deaths: 10
- Injuries: 3
- Perpetrator: Patrick Okot Odoch

The Bombo shooting was a mass murder that occurred in Bombo, Uganda on 9 March 2013. The perpetrator, 30-year-old Patrick Okot Odoch, a private in the Uganda People's Defence Force, shot and killed nine people in a bar and, while fleeing, a tenth victim. Odoch fled and was arrested ten days later, and was charged with murder and attempted murder. On 4 June, Odoch was found guilty of murder and sentenced to 90 years imprisonment.

== Background ==
On 5 March 2013, a combined group of army deserters and assorted armed criminals attacked the Mbuya barracks belonging to the Uganda People's Defence Force (UPDF) to steal the weapons located there.

Patrick Okot Odoch, a private in the UPDF who had a history of poor behavior and previously had been arrested for consuming bhang, was attached to the nearby Bombo barracks. Inspired by the chaos at the Mbuya barracks, on the following night of 6 March, Odoch had wanted to rape Grace Chandiru, the 14-year-old daughter of his commander, Sergeant Onesmus Odule. Odoch saw Grace at the Yumbe Boys' Bar in Pakele, a bar frequented by local military personnel and their families, and attempted to rape her. Odoch fled when Grace raised alarm, prompting her father Sergeant Odule to report the incident to police on the next day, 7 March, for which Odoch promised revenge.

Odoch entered the bar, locked the doors, before opening them again and leaving, probably planning his shooting. Odoch entered the bar again the next day at 9 p.m. while the Odules were present, this time with a colleague, however the owner told him to drink somewhere else, referring him to the incident that occurred on 7 March.

== Shooting ==
During the night of 8 March, while Odoch was on duty as part of the 23rd Air Defence Regiment, he deserted his post armed with an AK-47 assault rifle and 30 rounds of ammunition. Upon entering the bar on 9 March at 12:12 am, Odoch opened fire on the people present, killing Sergeant Odule, his wife Florence, the owner of the bar Amina Aseru, as well as four other soldiers and two civilians, while two people were wounded. Odoch then left and went towards Gogonya, about a mile (1.5 km) from the bar, where he killed another person. Before finally fleeing he also robbed Halima Lukiya, stealing her hand bag, a mobile phone, and USh 2,000/= in cash.

Nine of his victims died on the spot, while David Komakech died one hour later from excessive loss of blood. There were 23 spent rounds recovered by police from the crime scene.

=== Victims ===
Sgt. Onesmus Odule; Florence Akullu, wife of Onesmus Odule; Sarah Akole; Amina Aseru, the bar owner; Pte. Teddy Namatovu	Sgt. Joel Obote; Wilber Odiba; Cpl. Isaac Osere; David Komakech; Warrant Officer Francis Musana

Wounded were Joyce Asiyo, 44, and Ismail Akbar, 14, son of Amina Aseru. Reportedly Sgt. Francis Ogugu was also injured.

After the shooting the army offered every family of the victims 2,150,000/= in condolence and for burial arrangements, as well as coffins and transportation of the dead to their ancestral homes.

== Arrest and conviction ==
Following the shooting, security measures were tightened, and all army deserters in the area were ordered to leave, or they would risk arrest. Also a night curfew was imposed, forcing all businesses to close at 10 pm, and limiting movement from 11 pm onward.

Joint forces of the police and the army searched for Odoch, and laid traps to capture him. The search operations resulted in the finding of Odoch's uniform on 10 March, and on 14 March the rifle used in the shooting, which was recovered near a factory in Nakatonya Village in Nyimbwa Sub-county and was still loaded with three rounds. When Odoch called his colleagues to ask for financial help, investigators managed to track his mobile phone. He was arrested between 18 and 19 March at Abere Trading Centre in Ngai Sub-county in Oyam District, brought to the army barracks in Lira and charged with murder, attempted murder, misuse of a firearm, aggravated robbery, and failing to protect war materials, before being transferred back to Bombo, where he was held to be court-martialed in a public trial.

After denying all charges raised against him, Odoch was put in remand at Makindye Military Prison until 17 April. Preliminary hearings for the case began on 22 April at Bombo Town Health Centre. The maximum punishment Odoch is facing for the crime is a death sentence.

On june 4th, 2013, he was sentenced to a total of 90 years in prison; 65 years for the murders, 15 concurrent years for the attempted murders, 25 years for failure to protect the gun and 20 concurrent years for robbing two thousand shillings.

== See also ==
- Kampala wedding massacre
- Kamwenge Trading Centre shooting
- Arua nightclub shooting
- List of massacres in Uganda
- Human rights in Uganda
