= Mahagi =

City of the Democratic Republic of the Congo

- Location within Democratic Republic of the Congo
- Coordinates: 2.3°N 30.98°E

Population (2012)
  - Total: 19,399

Mahagi is a city of Ituri province in the Democratic Republic of the Congo. As of 2012, it had an estimated population of 19,399.
