= Meet al-Attar shooting =

2013 mass murder in Egypt

- Location: Meet al-Attar, near Banha, Qalyubia Governorate, Egypt
- Date: 21 August 2013; 6:30
- Attack type: Mass murder, shooting
- Weapon: AKMS assault rifle
- Deaths: 16 (including the perpetrator)
- Injuries: Unknown
- Perpetrator: Omar Abdul Razeq Abdullah Rifai

The Meet al-Attar shooting was a mass shooting that occurred in Meet al-Attar (Arabic: ميت العطار) a village near Banha, Egypt on 21 August 2013, when Omar Abdul Razeq Abdullah Rifai (Arabic: عمر عبد الرازق عبد الله الرفاعي), a 28-year-old unemployed poultry dealer and ex-convict who was recently released from his sentence after his involvement in the death of 23 people in 2008 over a family feud, fatally shot 15 people and possibly wounded several others, using an AKMS assault rifle, before being shot dead by villagers himself.

== Perpetrator ==
Omar Abdul Razeq Abdullah Rifai (1985 – 21 August 2013) was a resident of Meet al-Attar and an ex-convict. In 2008, was found guilty of involvement in a local vendetta in which 23 people were killed. He was recently released from prison after serving his term. His motive for the attack seems to be because they failed to support his family in a vendetta.

== Victims ==
- Ahmed Samir Ibrahim Abdel Raouf, 25, shot in the chest and left side, (Arabic: احمد سمير ابراهيم عبد الرؤوف)
- Abdel Aziz Abdel Fattah Abdel Aziz, 42, shot in the chest and arms, (Arabic: عبد العزيز عبد الفتاح عبد العزيز)
- Emad Hamdy Fathy Ali Allam, 23, shot in the abdomen, (Arabic: عماد حمدى فتحى على علام)
- Emad Husseiny Abdel-Hafiz Hanafi, 29, shot in the abdomen, (Arabic: عماد الحسينى عبد الحفيظ حنفى)
- Mohammed Shehta Sayed Hassan, 29, shot in the abdomen and right side, (Arabic: محمد شحته السيد حسن)
- Abdullah Zenhom Afifi Metwali, 25, shot in the neck and chest, (Arabic: عبد الله زينهم عفيفى متولى سن)
- Amin Ali Amin Al-Daedae, 33, shot in the chest, (Arabic: امين على امين الدعدع)
- Taha Ahmed Taha Ahmed Sayed, 25, shot in the chest and groin, (Arabic: طه احمد طه احمد السيد)
- Ibrahim Sayed Ibrahim Nada, 32, shot in the head, abdomen, and left thigh, (Arabic: ابراهيم السيد ابراهيم ندا)
- Hassan Abdel Alim Mohamed Hassan, 41, shot in the abdomen and pelvis, (Arabic: حسن عبد العليم محمد حسن)
- Hassan Mohammed Hadi Abdul Hafeez, 27, shot in the head and left arm, (Arabic: حسن محمد الهادى عبد الحفيظ)
- Abdel Fattah Mohamed Faraj Ibrahim, 25, shot in the neck and right side, (Arabic: عبد الفتاح محمد فرج ابراهيم)
- Mohammed Hashim Ibrahim Hashim, 31, shot in the chest, right side, and right arm, (Arabic: محمد هاشم ابراهيم هاشم)
- Mohamed Mahmoud Abdel Rahim Sayed, 25, shot in the back and right arm, (Arabic: محمد محمود عبد الرحيم السيد)
- Ahmed Abdul Azim Sayed Abdul Sadiq, 27, shot in the back, (Arabic: احمد عبد العظيم السيد عبد الصادق)
