= Kitagwenda District =

Ugandan district

- District
- District location in Uganda
- Coordinates: 00°01′43″S 30°20′10″E
- Country: Uganda
- Region: Western Uganda
- Sub-region: Toro sub-region
- Capital: Ntara

Government
  - LCV Chairman: Robert Mugabe

Population (2014 Census)
  - Total: 165,354
- Time zone: UTC+3 (EAT)
- Website: www.kitagwenda.go.ug

Kitagwenda District is a district in Western Uganda. The district is named after Kitagwenda County, which is coterminous with the district.

Kitagwenda District is part of the Kingdom of Toro, one of the ancient traditional monarchies in Uganda. The kingdom is coterminous with the Toro sub-region, home to an estimated 1 million inhabitants in 2002, according to the national population and housing census conducted that year. The districts that constitute the sub-region are: (a) Bunyangabu District (b) Kabarole District (c) Kamwenge District (d) Kyegegwa District (e) Kyenjojo District and (f) Kitagwenda District.

== Location ==
Kitagwenda District is bordered by Kabarole District to the northwest and north, Kamwenge District to the northeast, Ibanda District to the east and southeast, Rubirizi District to the southwest and Kasese District to the west.

Ntara, the district headquarters lies approximately 100 kilometres (62 mi), by road, south of Fort Portal, the largest city in Toro sub-region. This is 340 kilometres (211 mi), by road, west of Uganda's capital city, Kampala. The coordinates of Kitagwenda District are: 0°01'43.0"S, 30°20'10.0"E (Latitude:-0.028611; Longitude:30.336111).

== Overview ==
The district was created in 2019 by an Act of Parliament. Prior to then, it was part of Kamwenge District. The district is coterminous with Kitagwenda County, after which it is named. It is predominantly a rural area district.

Kitagwenda is made up of one county, two town councils and five sub-counties. The town councils are Ntara and Kabujogera. The sub-counties are Nyabbani, Ntara, Kanara, Kicheche and Mashyoro.

There are numerous aquatic systems in the district including:

- Lake George
- River Mpanga
- Dura River
- Kyambura Game Reserve
- Katonga Wildlife Nature Reserve
- Queen Elizabeth National Park
- Kashyoha-Kitomi forest reserve
- The Western Rift Valley
- Kinyamugara East African Plateau
- Bachwezi habitats around Kikondo ward hills
- Cycad Encephalartos whitelockii
- Mokele mbembe
- Mashyoro Tree of life

== Population ==
The 2011, the population of Kitagwenda County was estimated at 129,600 inhabitants. The national population census and household survey held on 27 August 2014, enumerated the population of Kitagwenda at 165,354 people. The predominant ethnic group in the district are Batagwenda and the language spoken is Rutagwenda.

== Economy ==
1. Bananas
2. Beans
3. Cassava
4. Coffee
5. Maize

== Livestocks ==
1. Cattle
2. Goats
3. Pigs

== See also ==
- Ntara
- Empire of Kitara
- Toro sub-region
- Western Region, Uganda
- Districts of Uganda
