= Kamwenge District =

- District
- District location in Uganda
- Coordinates: 00°14′11″N 30°29′30″E
- Country: Uganda
- Region: Western Uganda
- Sub-region: Toro sub-region
- Capital: Kamwenge

Area
  - Total: 2,439.4 km^{2} (941.9 sq mi)
  - Land: 2,375.3 km^{2} (917.1 sq mi)
  - Water: 64.1 km^{2} (24.7 sq mi)

Population (2014 Census)
  - Total: 249,100
  - Density: 139.8/km^{2} (362/sq mi)
- Time zone: UTC+3 (EAT)
- Website: www.kamwenge.go.ug

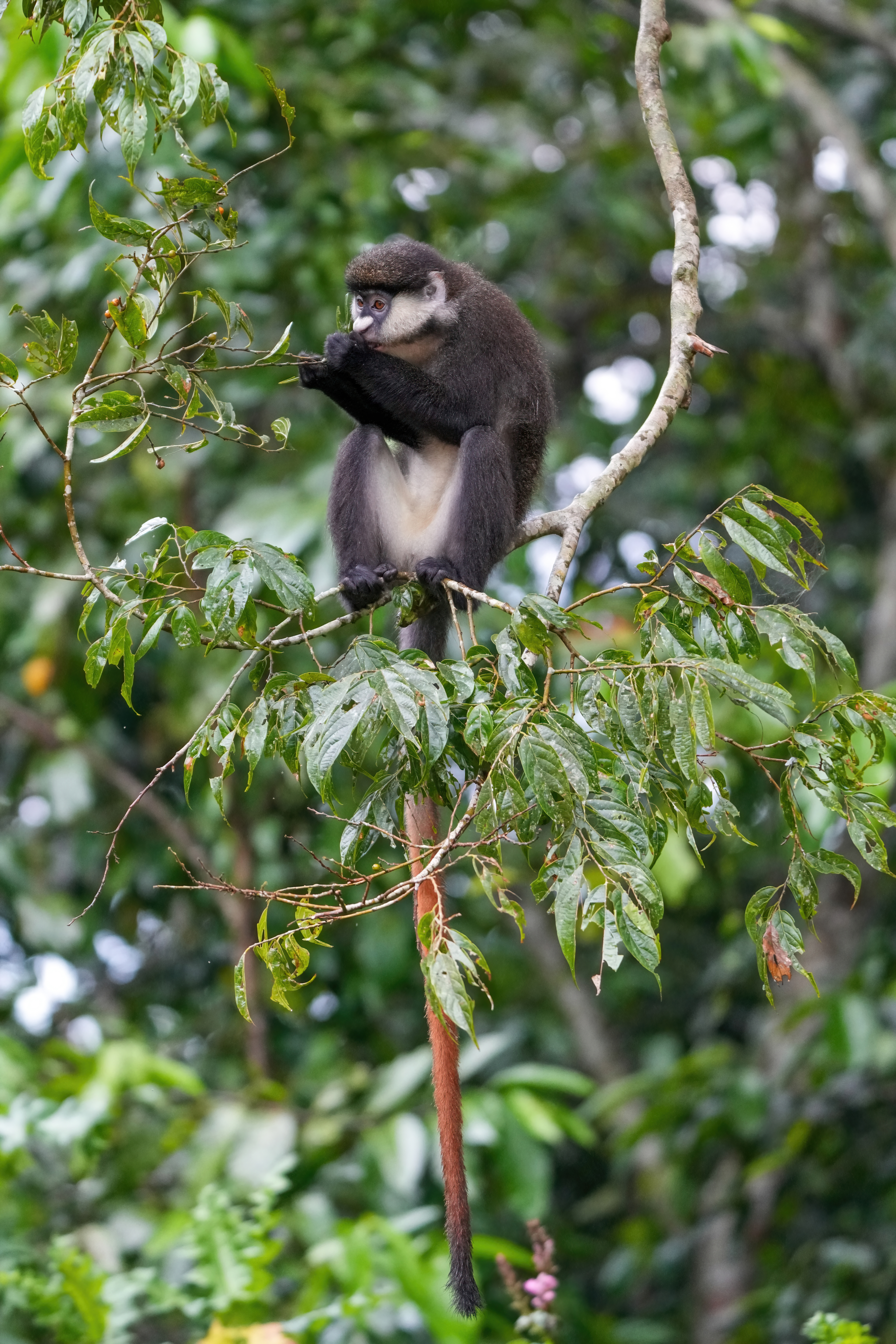
Red-tailed monkey at Kibale forest National Park Photo in Kamwenge district.

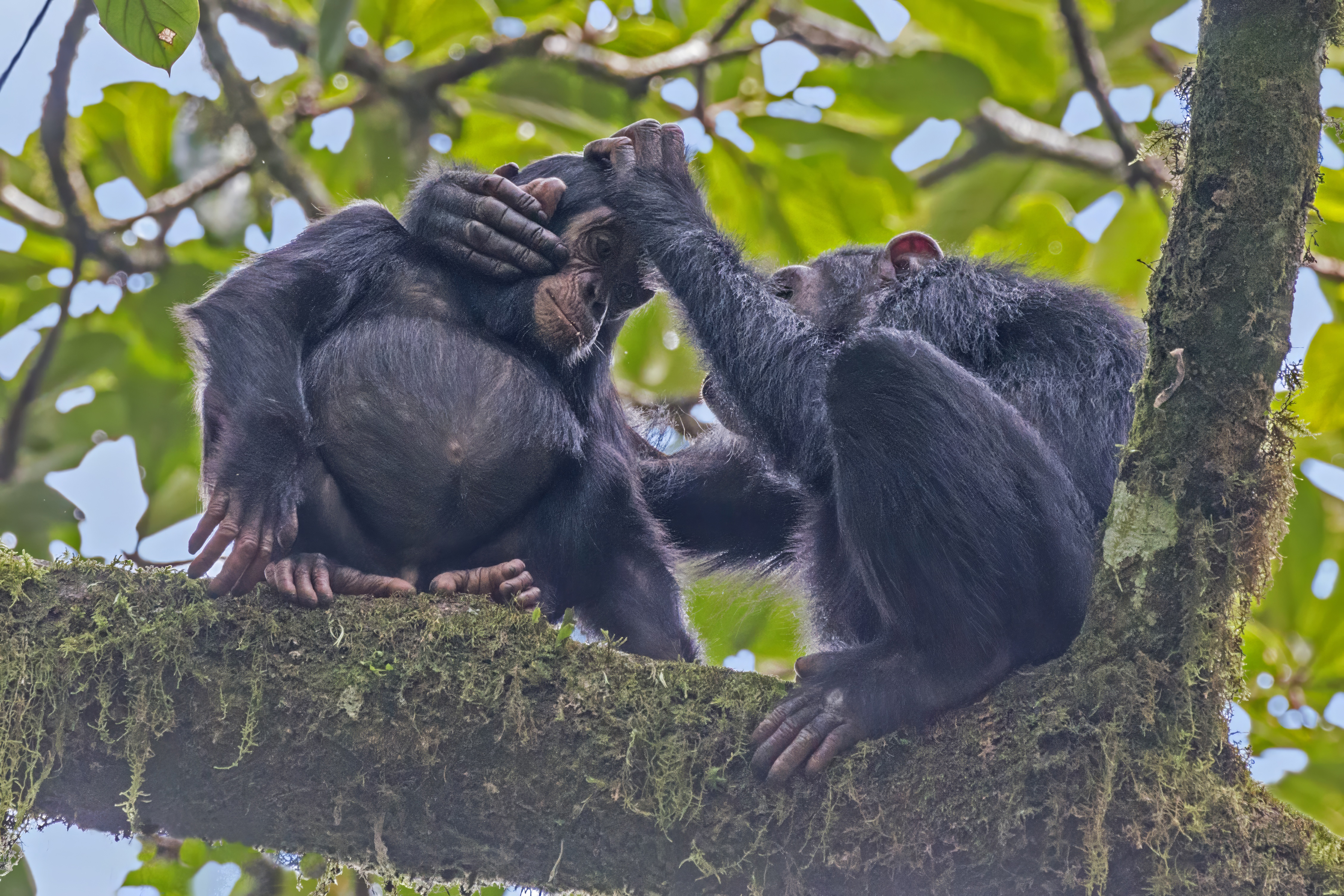
Common chimpanzees that are found in Kibale national park in Kamwenge district.

Kamwenge District is a district in Western Uganda. It is named after its 'chief town', Kamwenge, where the district headquarters are located. Kamwenge District is part of the Kingdom of Toro, one of the ancient traditional monarchies in Uganda. The kingdom is coterminous with Toro sub-region. The districts that constitute the sub-region are: (a) Bunyangabu District (b) Kabarole District (c) Kamwenge District (d) Kyegegwa District (e) Kitagwenda District and (f) Kyenjojo District.

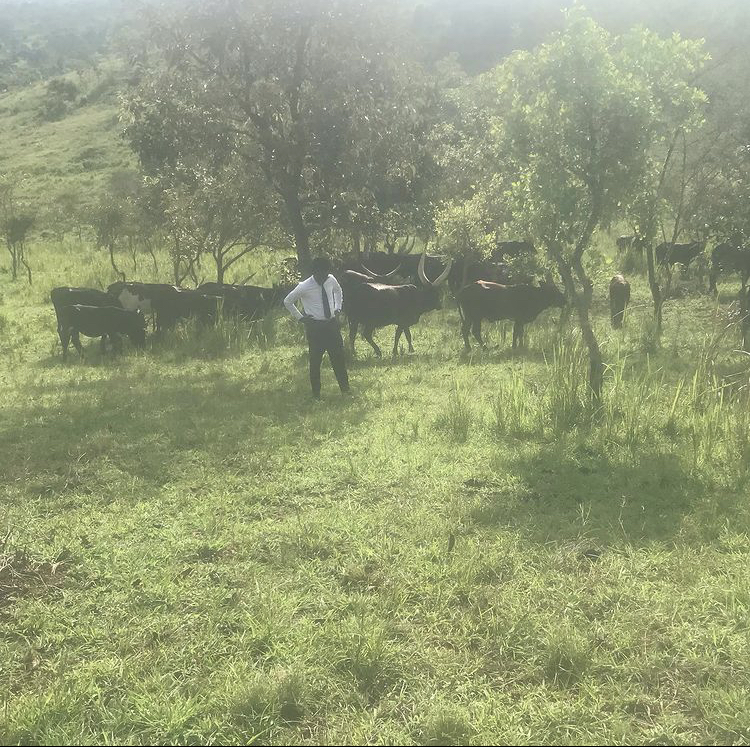
Cattle grazing in Kamwenge district, Western Uganda.

== Location ==
Kamwenge District is bordered by Kyenjojo District to the north, Kyegegwa District and Kiruhura District to the northeast, Ibanda District to the east and southeast, Kitagwenda District to the south, Kasese District to the west Bunyangabu District and Kabarole District to the northwest.

The town of Kamwenge, where the district headquarters are located, is approximately 64 kilometres (40 mi), by road, south-east of Fort Portal, the largest city in the Toro sub-region. This is approximately 307 kilometres (191 mi), by road, west of Uganda's capital, Kampala. The geographical coordinates of Kamwenge District are:0°14'11.0"N, 30°29'30.0"E (Latitude:0.236389; Longitude:30.491667).

== Overview ==
The district was created in 2000 by an Act of Parliament. Previously, it was part of Kabarole District. It covers an area of approximately 1788.5 Km2. 2.6% is covered by open water. It is predominantly a rural district with some of the worst poverty levels in the country. The district has one hospital-Rukunyu in Kahunge sub county on Kamwenge Fortportal road.

Kamwenge shares boundaries with eight Districts namely; Kasese in the West, Kabarole and Bunyangabu in the North West and extreme North, Kyenjojo in the North and Kyegegwa in North East, Kazo in the East, Kitagwenda in the south, and Ibanda in the South East. The population projection for 2018 is 270,668 of which males are 132,537 and female 138,131. The population is forecasted to grow at 3.3% per annum.

== Economic activity ==
Agro processing and commercial farming are the major economic activities and source of livelihood in the district. Bananas dominate the grown tradable crops followed by maize, cassava and sweet potatoes. Other crops include sorghum, millet, groundnuts, beans, tea, coffee, cotton, nuts, beans, tea, coffee, cotton, tomatoes, cabbage, onions and pineapples, which are all grown on small scale mainly for subsistence. There is also animal husbandry. The District population is also engaged in agro-forestry, aquaculture, apiaries. The coming of Congolese refugees affected cattle keepers in the area as they were displaced and had to relocate to other places within and outside the district. Land in the refuge settlement is now used for agricultural production especially maize, beans and Irish potatoes; the area has become a business centre attracting traders from the whole country.

The growth of rural trading centres, which is, attributed to increased road network especially those opened under Development Response to Displacement Impact Project (DRDIP), Uganda National Roads Authority (UNRA), Uganda Road Fund and UNHCR. This has also created great impact on business opportunities. Similarly, the ongoing rural electrification programme targeting the entire District has increased linear settlements thus changing land use patterns to small-scale informal sector activities like welding, value addition in agriculture and other related occupations.

The natural beauty of flora and fauna of Kibale forest has made Kamwenge a tourist destination, which hosts an estimated 12,455 tourists annually. Katonga game reserve also has its unique tourist attractions that influence land use with the neighbouring pastoralist communities and some land encroachers who have been battling with government over rights to occupation.

The district is endowed with numerous wetlands, tropical forests, grasslands and woodlands in the Kibale National Park shared with Kabarole District and Katonga game reserve, which it shares with Kazo District and Kyegegwa District. Other natural resources include Limestone, Gold, Tin, Marble, Sand, Clay and stone quarries. Other natural endowments include:

- River Rushango
- Katonga Nature Reserve

== Population ==
The national population census and household survey of 27 August 2014 enumerated the population of Kamwenge District at 414,454 inhabitants. The same census enumerated the population of Kitagwenda District at 165,354. In July 2019, Kitagwenda District was carved out of Kamwenge, leaving a population of 249,100, in 2014 numbers.

== Ethnicities and languages ==
The predominant ethnic group in the district are Bakiga, followed by Bafumbira. Other tribes include the indigenous Batoro; Batagwenda, Banyarwanda and several other tribes . Bakiga from Kabale District settled in the district in the late 1960s and early 1950s. The languages spoken include:

- Rutooro
- Rukiga
- Rutagwenda
- Rufumbira
- Kinyarwanda

== Economic activities ==
Agriculture is the mainstay of the district economy. Crops raised include:

- Sorghum
- Maize
- Millet
- Peas
- Groundnuts
- Sunflower
- Sweet potatoes
- Beans
- Tea
- Coffee
- Cotton
- Tomatoes
- Cabbage
- Onions
- Pineapples

== Livestock ==
- Cattle
- Goat
- Sheep
- Chicken

== Prominent people ==
- Frank Tumwebaze a Ugandan educator and politician. He is the current Cabinet Minister of Information Technology and Communications in the Cabinet of Uganda. He was appointed to that position on 6 June 2016
- Abigaba Cuthbert Mirembe a Ugandan engineer and current Member Parliament for Kibale County
- Sylvia Bahireira Tumwekwase, the current woman member of parliament representing the district.

== Urban centres ==
There are many developing urban centres in the district. This is partly due to population increase and development of trading centres and rural electrification. The major urban centres include:

- Kamwenge: the chief town of the district.
- Kahunge : another town council within the district.
- Biguri: a settlement in the district
- Bigodi: Another settlement in the district.
- Kabuga: A town council in the district.
- Rwamwanja: A settlement that harbours refugees.
- Kabambiro: A settlement in the district

== Geographical features ==
Kabuga Hill is about 5 kilometres (3.1 mi) from Kamwenge town, rising about 1,581 metres (5,187 ft). above sea level. Its foothills contain farming homesteads and small communities of both temporary and permanent structures.

== See also ==
- Kamwenge
- List of massacres in Uganda
- Toro sub-region
- Western Region, Uganda
- Districts of Uganda
