= Kamwenge =

- Location in Uganda
- Coordinates: 00°11′10″N 30°27′14″E
- Country: Uganda
- Region: Western Uganda
- Sub-region: Toro sub-region
- District: Kamwenge District
- Elevation: 4,200 ft (1,280 m)

Population (2014 Census)
  - Total: 19,240

Kamwenge is a town in the Western Region of Uganda. It is the site of the Kamwenge District headquarters.

== Location ==
Kamwenge is approximately 300 kilometres (190 mi) west of Kampala, Uganda's capital and largest city. This is approximately 70 kilometres (43 mi), by road, southeast of Fort Portal, the largest town in the Toro sub-region. The coordinates of the town are 0°11'10.0"N, 30°27'14.0"E (Latitude:0.186111; Longitude:30.453889).

== Population ==
The 2002 population of Kamwenge was recorded at about 13,320 by the national population census. In 2010, the Uganda Bureau of Statistics (UBOS) estimated the population at 16,100. In 2011, UBOS estimated the population at 16,300. During the 2014 national population census, the population was put at 19,240.

== Points of interest ==
The following additional points of interest lie within or close to the town:

- headquarters of Kamwenge District Administration
- offices of Kamwenge Town Council
- Kamwenge central market
- Kamwenge Campus of Uganda Pentecostal University
- Mpanga Power Station, located at Mpanga, approximately 18 kilometres (11 mi), by road, southwest of town
- Nyakahita–Kazo–Kamwenge–Fort Portal Road - the 208 kilometres (129 mi) road passes through the town.

== See also ==
- List of cities and towns in Uganda
