= Aruu Falls =

Waterfall in Uganda

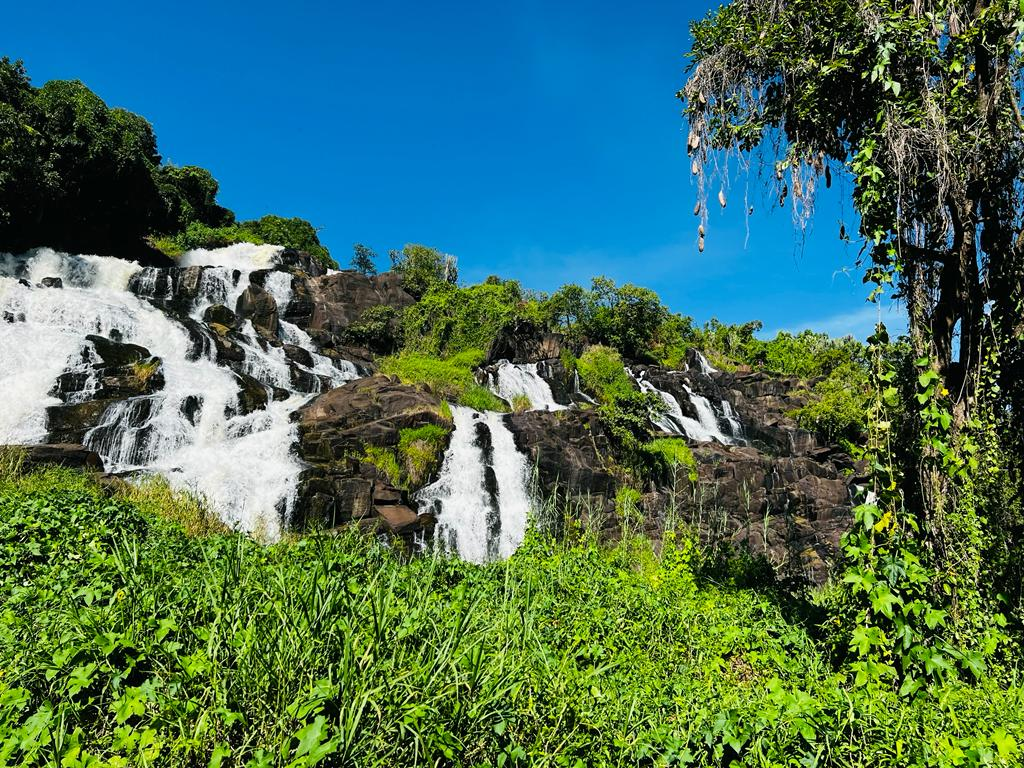
- Aruu Falls

- Location within Uganda
- Location: Uganda
- Nearest city: Pader
- Coordinates: 02°53′48″N 32°38′49″E
- Governing body: Ugandan Wildlife Authority

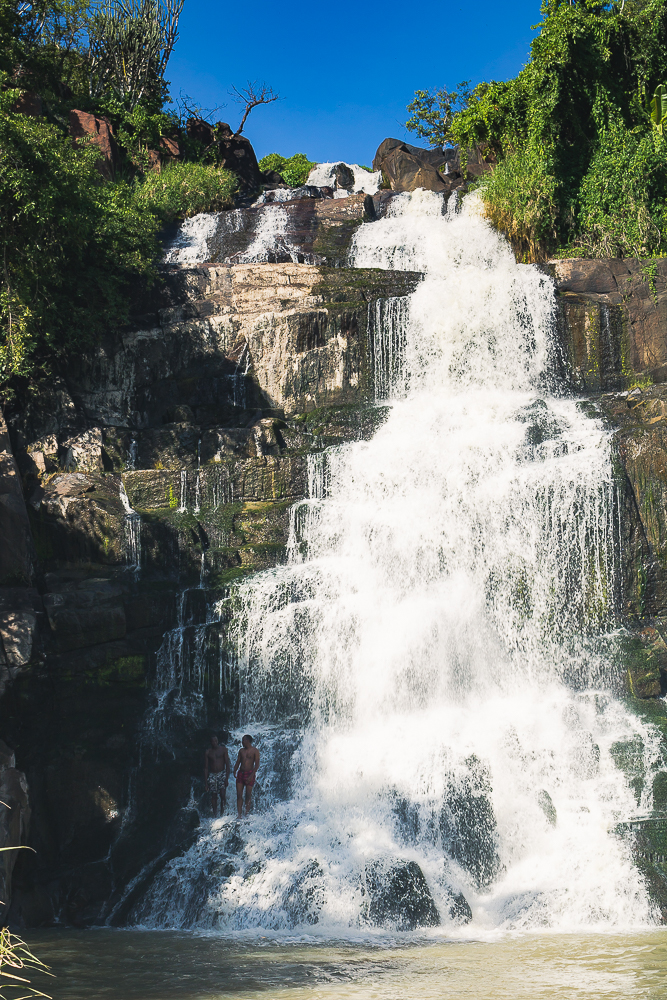
Aruu Falls; Nature's Majestic Cascade in Northern Uganda

ruu Falls, also known as Aruu Falls Camspite, are natural waterfalls located in Northern Uganda along the Gulu Kitgum highway in Pader District. The falls are 47 kilometers away from Gulu, 57 kilometers away from Kitgum, and 386 kilometers away from Kampala, the capital city of Uganda.

== Name ==
The name of the falls was derived from the Luo word “Aruu,” meaning “woken up”. The waterfalls are believed to have attained its name from the clan of Pyailim; clan leaders say the noise of the falls kept them from sleeping during the night.

== Setting and structure ==
The waterfalls is located in Lupaya village, Angagura sub county, Pader district. It is surrounded by lush vegetation. The site holds cultural significance in Acholi tradition and boasts a rich political history, with former President Idi Amin Dada who visited the falls quite often for political planning.

The source of the falls is believed to have originated from the Timu forest in Kabong. The water flows through to Agago and then to Pader.

== Controversy ==
The waterfalls are historically and culturally significant, so proposed plans to develop the falls have caused controversy.

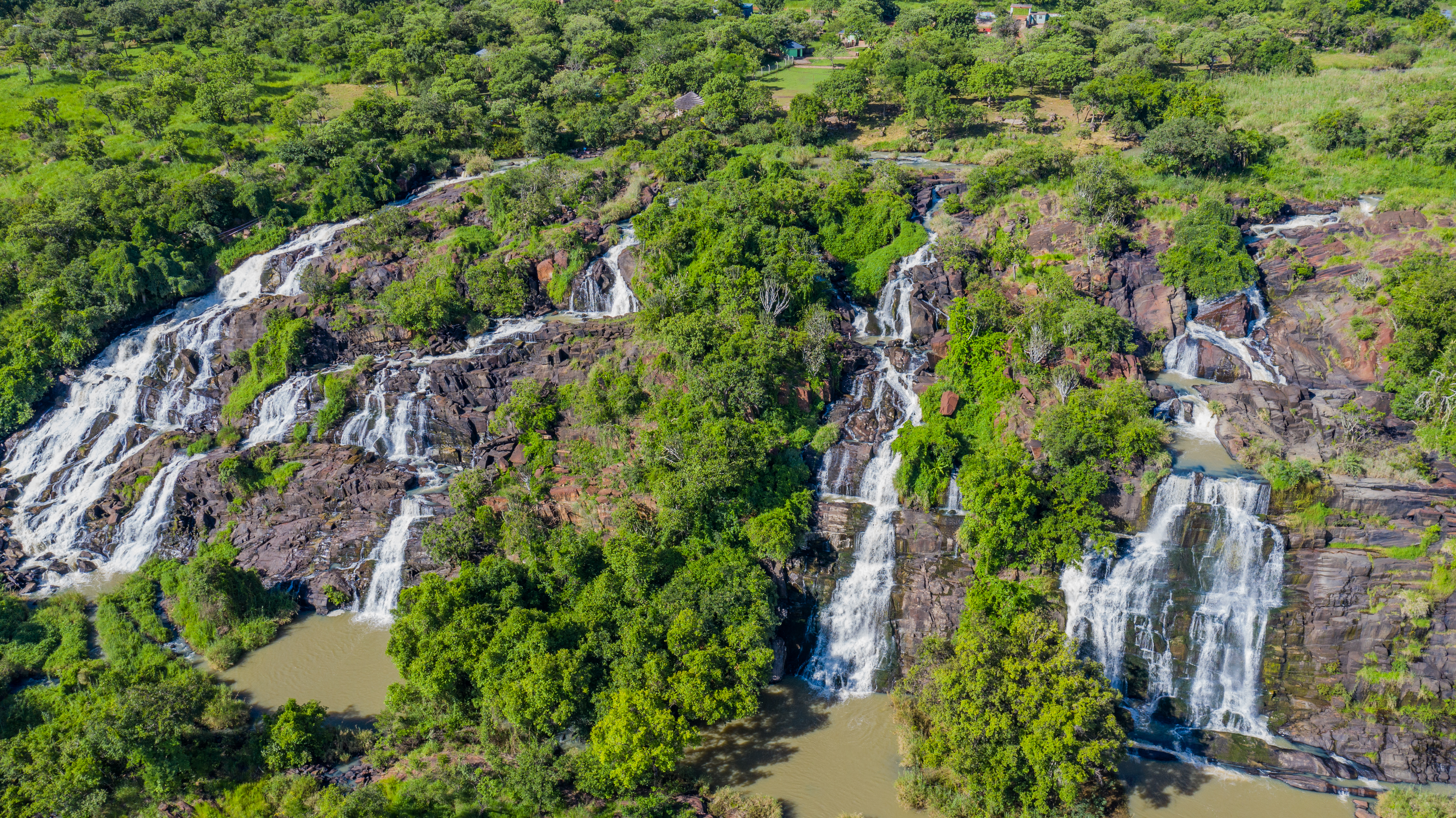
The beautiful cascading Aruu waterfalls are located in northern Uganda within Pader District about 4 and a half kilometers from the Pader-Kitgum highway. The waterfalls are located in the middle of a forested area and the encompassing area is inhabited by the Acholi and Langi people who are mainly peasant farmers.

Aruu falls video

== See also ==
- List of National Cultural Sites in Northern Region, Uganda
- Kidepo Valley National Park
- Fort Patiko
- Pader District
- Kitgum District
- Lamwo District
