= St. Joseph's Hospital Kitgum =

Private non-profit, faith-based, community hospital in Uganda

- Uganda Catholic Medical Bureau

Geography
- Location: Kitgum, Kitgum District, Northern Region, Uganda
- Coordinates: 03°18′10″N 32°53′32″E

Organisation
- Care system: Private
- Type: Community

Services
- Emergency department: I
- Beds: 280

History
- Founded: 1943; 83 years ago

Links
- Website: Homepage
- Other links: Hospitals in Uganda

St. Joseph's Hospital Kitgum (SJHK), is a hospital in the Northern Region of Uganda. It is a private, non-profit, community hospital, serving the town of Kitgum and surrounding areas of Kitgum District, Lamwo District and parts of the Republic of South Sudan. In addition, the hospital receives many patients from Kotido District, Abim District, Moroto District, Agago District and Pader District.

== Location ==
SJHK is located in the town of Kitgum, approximately 105 kilometres (65 mi), by road, northeast of Gulu Regional Referral Hospital, in the city of Gulu. This is about 269 kilometres (167 mi), by road, northwest of Moroto Regional Referral Hospital, in the city of Moroto.

SJHK lies approximately 126 kilometres (78 mi), by road, north of Lira Regional Referral Hospital, in the city of Lira. The geographical coordinates of St. Joseph's Hospital Kitgum are: 03°18'10.0"N, 32°53'32.0"E (Latitude:03.302778; Longitude: 32.892222).

== Overview ==
St. Joseph's Hospital Kitgum is a private, non-profit, community hospital owned by the Roman Catholic Archdiocese of Gulu, and is accredited by the Uganda Catholic Medical Bureau. It is administered by the Sisters of Mary Immaculate. On 16 November 1925, Sister Amalia Lonardi, started a dispensary on the veranda of the Comboni Sisters' Convent. At that time, the area had a high prevalence of leprosy patients and the dispensary was able to offer pain medication and palliative care. On 23 December 1938, Sister Secondina Chito relocated the dispensary to under a mango tree on the lawn of the Sisters' Convent. That tree still stands as of November 2020.

The dispensary was elevated to a Health Center in May 1954, with the establishment of maternity services by Sister Maria Rosa, in consultation with the Bishop of Gulu Diocese at the time, Monsignor John Baptist Cesana. Sister Maria Rosa was assisted by Midwife Eufrasia Nanyonga, who arrived from Kampala on 18 August 1954.

Beginning in May 1955, visiting doctors from Gulu Hospital began making periodic visits along with visiting missionary doctors. The Uganda Ministry of Health elevated the Health Center to a hospital on 1 January 1960. This coincided with the arrival of the first full-time doctor from Italy, Dr. Lai Giovanninowho. He came with his wife and their baby. The hospital continued to expand and offer valuable quality care. In 1973, the Italian missionaries turned over ownership of the hospital to the Roman Catholic Archdiocese of Gulu, which in turn entrusted the hospital's management to the Sisters of Mary Immaculate.

== Hospital operations ==
As of December 2019, St. Joseph's Hospital Kitgum St. Joseph's Hospital Kitgum attended to 33,138 outpatients annually, on average. This was approximately 10 percent of outpatients attended to in Kitgum District, on an annual basis. At that time, the hospital admitted 10,246 inpatients, accounting for approximately 36.7 percent of the annual inpatient admissions in the entire district on average. Its bed occupancy ratio averaged 69.3 percent in 2019.

As of that time, St. Joseph's Hospital Kitgum delivered 1,925 babies annually, on average, with a caesarian section rate of 20.9 percent. This accounted for 24.5 percent of maternal deliveries in Kitgum District.

Patient user fees accounted for approximately 15.6 percent of total hospital annual income, as of December 2019.

== Governance ==
The chairman of the hospital's Board of Governors, is John Baptist Odama, the Archbishop of the Roman Catholic Diocese of Gulu. The Medical Superintendent and Chief Executive Officer is Dr. Lawrence Ojom.

== See also ==
- Kitgum Hospital
- Uganda Hospitals
- Uganda Catholicism
- Kitgum District
