= Kitgum Hospital =

- Uganda Ministry of Health

Geography
- Location: Kitgum, Kitgum District, Northern Uganda, Uganda
- Coordinates: 03°17′39″N 32°52′52″E

Organisation
- Care system: Public
- Type: General

Services
- Emergency department: I
- Beds: 200

History
- Founded: 1948

Links
- Other links: Hospitals in Uganda

Kitgum Hospital, is a government-owned hospital in Northern Uganda. It serves as the district hospital for Kitgum District.

== Location ==
The hospital is located in the central business district of the town of Kitgum, approximately 435 kilometres (270 mi), by road, north of Kampala, the capital and largest city in that East African country. This is approximately 102 kilometres (63 mi), by road, northeast of Gulu, the largest city in Uganda's Northern Region. The coordinates of Kitgum Hospital are:3°17'39.0"N, 32°52'52.0"E (Latitude:3.294167; Longitude:32.881111).

== Overview ==
Kitgum Hospital is a public hospital, established in 1934. It is intended to serve as the district hospital for Kitgum District and surrounding communities. A large number of patients are attended to from the districts of Abim, Agago, Kabong, Kotido, Lamwo, Nwoya and Pader. A significant number of the hospital patients come from neighboring South Sudan. This has put great strain on the hospital resources, including the understaffed, underpaid personnel; the dilapidated and antiquated infrastructure & equipment and the inadequate financial resources.

== See also ==
- Hospitals in Uganda
- Health in Uganda
- St. Joseph's Hospital Kitgum
