= Adilang =

- Map of Uganda showing the location of Adilang.
- Coordinates: 02°44′24″N 33°28′48″E
- Country: Uganda
- Region: Northern Region of Uganda
- Sub-region: Acholi sub-region
- District: Agago District
- Elevation: 1,100 m (3,600 ft)
- Time zone: UTC+3 (EAT)

Adilang is a town in the Northern Region of Uganda.

== Location ==
The town is in Adilang sub-county, Agago District, Acholi sub-region. It is approximately 40 kilometres (25 mi) southeast of Agago, where the district headquarters are located. This is approximately 170 kilometres (110 mi), directly east of Gulu, the largest urban center in the Northern Region. The coordinates of Adilang are:2° 44' 24.00"N, 33° 28' 48.00"E (Latitude:2.7400; Longitude:33.4800).

== Overview ==
Adilang is an urban center and administered by the Adilang Town Council, an urban local government.

== Points of interest ==
The following points of interest are located inside the town or near its edges:

- offices of Adilang Town council
- offices of Adilang sub-county
- Adilang central market
- Gulu-Abim road, passing through town in a west–east direction
- Adilang-Naamokoro road, making a T-junction with the Gulu-Abim road, in the middle of town.

== See also ==
- Patongo
