= Kalongo Hospital =

Ugandan private faith-based community hospital

- Uganda Catholic Medical Bureau

Geography
- Location: Kalongo, Agago District, Northern Region, Uganda
- Coordinates: 03°02′41″N 33°22′21″E

Organisation
- Care system: Private
- Type: Community

Services
- Emergency department: I
- Beds: 350

History
- Founded: 1934

Links
- Other links: Hospitals in Uganda

Kalongo Hospital, also known as Dr. Ambrosoli Memorial Hospital, is a hospital in Northern Uganda. It is a private, community hospital, serving the town of Kalongo and surrounding areas of Agago District, Pader District and parts of Kitgum District.

== Location ==
The hospital is located in the town of Kalongo, Agago District, Acholi sub-region, in the Northern Region of Uganda. This location lies approximately 160 kilometres (99 mi), by road, northeast of Gulu, the largest city in the sub-region. Kalongo is located approximately 462 kilometres (287 mi), by road, northeast of Kampala, the capital of Uganda and the largest city in that country. The geographical coordinates of Kalongo Hospital are: 03°02'41.0"N, 33°22'21.0"E (Latitude:3.044722; Longitude:33.372500).

== Overview ==
Kalongo Hospital is a private, non-profit, community hospital owned by the Roman Catholic Archdiocese of Gulu, and is accredited by the Uganda Catholic Medical Bureau. It is administered by the Sisters of Mary Immaculate.

The hospital was started in a grass-hut by Sister Eletta Mantiero, a Comboni Missionary Sister, as a dispensary in 1934. It soon started delivering babies and attending to medical and pediatric patients.

In 1957, Dr. Fr. Giuseppe Ambrosoli, an Italian physician, surgeon and catholic priest, began the transformation of the dispensary into a full-fledged hospital. At that time the dispensary was treating many leprosy patients. Dr. Ambrosoli revolutionalised the care for leprosy patients, by admitting them to the same hospital as other patients, instead of confining them to a leprosarium. At that time, leprosaria were generally badly managed and led to patient neglect, especially in Tropical Africa.

Today, the hospital is a 350-bed facility, that admits patients in the disciplines of Internal Medicine, General Surgery, Pediatrics and Obstetrics/Gynecology. As of January 2010, Kalongo Hospital employed over 300 staff members.

The hospital has been renamed Dr. Ambrosoli Memorial Hospital, after its founder. As of October 2020, it averages 26,012 annual outpatients visits, with 11,796 annual inpatient admissions. Annual maternal deliveries average 2,665, with a caesarian rate of 15.3 percent. The hospital operates on income derived from patient fees, donations and annual government subsidies. However, no patient is turned away because of inability to pay. On average, patient fees account for approximately 9.8 percent of total hospital annual income and the Government subsidy accounts for about 18.4 percent of annual hospital income.

In 1959 Dr. Fr. Giuseppe Ambrosolio established St. Mary's School of Midwifery, with a view of someday in the future handing over the care of the patients to local Ugandan staff. As of July 2011, the school had a student body of about 120. The school is closely affiliated with the hospital.

== See also ==
- Uganda Hospitals
