= Pader Airfield =

Airfield in Uganda

- IATA: n/a; ICAO: n/a

Summary
- Airport type: Public & civilian
- Owner/Operator: Pader District Administration
- Location: Pader, Uganda
- Elevation AMSL: 3,369 ft / 1,027 m
- Coordinates: 02°51′08″N 33°04′48″E

Map
- Location of Pader Airfield in Uganda

Runways
Direction	Length		Surface
Direction	m	ft	Surface
00/18	1,200	3,937	Murram

Pader Airfield (also Patongo Airfield) (IATA: n/a, ICAO: n/a) is an airfield serving Pader and Patongo, two towns, 33 kilometres (21 mi) apart, in the south-eastern part of Pader District, in the Northern Region of Uganda.

== Location ==
The airfield is located in Lunar Parish, within Pader District, approximately 324 kilometres (201 mi), by air, and 475 kilometres (295 mi), by road, north-east of Entebbe International Airport, Uganda's largest airport. Gulu Airport lies approximately 106 kilometres (66 mi), as the crow flies, south west of Pader.

The airfield's runway measures 1,200 metres (3,937 ft), in length and is 20 metres (66 ft) wide with a 25 centimetres (10 in) murram surface. The town of Pader lies at an average elevation of 1,027 metres (3,369 ft) above mean sea level The geographical coordinates of the arfield are: 02°51'08.0"N, 33°04'48.0"E (Latitude:2.852222; Longitude:33.080000).

== Overview ==
The airfield was developed in 2006, by Medair, a non-profit based in Geneva, Switzerland, to serve the people of Patongo and surrounding communities. Medair received financial and other support from the European Union to complete this infrastructure development. The airfield cost USh250 million to build in 2006 (approx. US$100,000 in 2006 money). At the time of commissioning, Medair deeded the maintenance and management of the airstrip to local authorities.

Pader airfield was built to facilitate safe travel for aid workers who were working with the estimated 40,000 people who were confined to the Patongo IDP Camp, at the height of the LRA insurgency in the early and mid 2000s.

== See also ==
- List of airports in Uganda
- Transport in Uganda
