= Giuseppe Ambrosoli =

Catholic priest

Blessed Giuseppe Ambrosoli M.C.C.I.
- Fr Ambrosoli Statue Kalongo
- Church: Roman Catholic Church

Orders
- Ordination: 17 December 1955 by Giovanni Battista Montini

Personal details
- Born: Giuseppe Ambrosoli; 25 July 1923 Ronago, Como, Kingdom of Italy
- Died: 27 March 1987 (aged 63) Lira, Uganda
- Education: University of Milan (Doctor of Medicine); London School of Hygiene and Tropical Medicine (Diploma in Tropical Medicine and Hygiene); Unknown (Religious Studies)

Sainthood
- Feast day: 28 July
- Venerated in: Roman Catholic Church
- Beatified: 20 November 2022; Sacred Heart of Jesus Parish Church, Kalongo, Uganda by Archbishop Luigi Bianco

Giuseppe Ambrosoli (25 July 1923 – 27 March 1987) was an Italian Catholic priest and professed member from the Comboni Missionaries of the Heart of Jesus. He served as a doctor and surgeon as well as being a philanthropist and educator in the missions in Uganda. Ambrosoli studied before World War II when he once risked his life to smuggle Jewish people into Switzerland before returning home to finish his studies in medicine prior to commencing his ecclesial studies. He joined the Comboni missionaries and was sent to Uganda where he became known as the "saint doctor" for his loving and compassionate treatment of all ill people whom he dedicated himself to.

His cause for canonization opened in Uganda – though held also in Como – in 1999 and he became titled as a Servant of God. The confirmation of his life of heroic virtue led Pope Francis to name him as Venerable on 17 December 2015. Francis later confirmed a miracle attributed to him on 28 November 2019 which would enable for Ambrosoli to be beatified; it was celebrated in Kalongo on 20 November 2022.

== Life ==
=== Medical studies and priesthood ===
Giuseppe Ambrosoli was born in Ronago in 1923 as the seventh son to Giovanni Battista Ambrosoli and Palmira Valli (d. 1977). His paternal great-grandfather worked as a librarian.

Ambrosoli studied first in Como and later under the Piarists in Genoa before returning to Como for his high school studies which he completed after his examinations in 1942. He joined the "Cenacle" which was a branch of the Azione Cattolica that the Franciscan Silvio Riva ran and Ambrosoli got the chance to get to know Riva who served as a spiritual guide for him and his religious formation.

He studied medicine at the Milanese college but had to stop his studies due to World War II. In September 1943 he risked his own life pledging to save a large number of Jewish people in order to get them safe passage across the border to Switzerland to prevent them from ending up in concentration camps. He took care of them and he himself took refuge with them fearing he would be captured on the return home. He returned home to learn from his parents that he was required to join the armed forces and he started on 27 March 1944. Ambrosoli was stationed at the Heuberg-Stetten training camp near Stuttgart and returned home in December 1944 for additional service. Ambrosoli served at Collecchio near Parma and later in Berceto where he became known for his closeness to the town's poor.

He resumed his studies in November 1946 after the war's end and graduated from the college in Milan as a Doctor of Medicine on 28 July 1949. He then proceeded to obtain a tropical medicine diploma from a college in London before returning to his homeland where he commenced his studies for the priesthood in Venegono. He received his ordination as a priest in Milan at the cathedral on 17 December 1955 from the Archbishop of Milan Giovanni Battista Montini – the future Pope Paul VI.

=== Doctor ===
He served as both a priest and doctor before he arrived in Uganda as a professed member of the Comboni Missionaries of the Heart of Jesus. He had begun his novitiate in Gozzano on 18 October 1951 and made his first profession in 1953. On 1 February 1956 he was posted to Kalongo (in Northern Uganda) to serve as the parish priest and also to run a clinic that at that time was seeing a lot of leper cases. He learnt the Acholi language in order to better communicate with the locals.

In 1957 he began the transformation of the clinic into the Kalongo Hospital leading to expansion with 345 beds. He is credited with the transformation of care for lepers in admitting them to the same hospital as other patients instead of confining them to a leprosaria. Those leprosaria were at the time managed to a poor degree that led to patient neglect. In 1959 he established the "Saint Mary's School of Midwivery with a view of handing over the care of the patients to local Ugandan staff at some stage in the future.

Ambrosoli loved the writings of Saint Charles de Foucauld. He was convinced that a doctor was called to lend his work to the suffering of Jesus Christ in the face of the poor and vulnerable and often said that "I am His servant for people suffering". He also often said that "God is love". When blood transfusions were scarce he himself donated his own blood to those in need of it.

=== Insurrection relocation ===
On 13 February 1987, as an insurrection raged in the Acholi sub-region and in the neighbouring subregions of Lango and Teso, the Uganda People's Defense Force evacuated the staff and patients of Kalongo Hospital through force and set fire to the medicine and hospital supplies left behind to prevent them from falling into the hands of the LRA. Ambrosoli had been given 24 hours to evacuate the hospital. The nursing school was relocated for a brief time to Angal Hospital. The Doctor Ambrosoli Memorial Hospital was re-established in 1989 and the nursing school was relocated back to Kalongo in 1990.

=== Death ===
Ambrosoli died on 27 March 1987 at the Comboni Mission in Lira after he had been diagnosed with kidney disease. He persuaded his superiors to send him back to Kalongo to work despite the worries of his doctors. His successor at Kalongo became the priest Egidio Tocalli who was en route to evacuate him via helicopter for further treatment. The cause of his death is stated as renal failure.

He celebrated his final Mass on 22 March at the Comboni College chapel and that afternoon felt feverish. He went to bed with the nuns being notified of his condition since he and others believed he had contracted malaria. His fever was high and the treatments for his condition began on 23 March though he had been pessimistic about his chances since he knew his condition would become serious. The sisters grew worried on 24 March since he had been vomiting though the night of 26–27 March grew even worse. Sister Romilde watched over Ambrosoli during that night though the morning on 27 March saw his condition collapse at an alarming rate. Sister Romilde gave him medicine in drip doses while the priest asked for Father Marchetti to hear his confession before he died.

He felt somewhat better around 5:00am and confided to Sister Romilde that he had a few hours left to live though was content and said of it: "Be it God's will". Over the next several hours the distance between breaths lengthened and soon his breathing ceased as his heartbeat slowed. He died at 1:50pm. His niece Giovanna graduated a week after her uncle's death.

Cardinal Gianfranco Ravasi praised Ambrosoli for his "faith in Christ and of Christian love to which he had consecrated his entire existence".

== Beatification ==
The beatification process passed its first hurdle after the forum for the local process was moved on 16 April 1999 from Lira (where the late priest died) to Gulu. The cause commenced under Pope John Paul II on 17 July 1999 after the Congregation for the Causes of Saints issued the edict declaring "nihil obstat" (no objections to the cause) and titled Ambrosoli as a Servant of God. John Baptist Odama inaugurated the diocesan process of investigation in Gulu on 22 August 1999 and later closed the investigation on 4 February 2001 before all documents were to be sent to the C.C.S. in Rome for further investigation. But this could not happen until another process was held in Como which Renato Corti oversaw from 7 November 1999 until 30 June 2001. The C.C.S. validated these processes on 4 June 2004 and received the Positio dossier from the postulation in 2009 for investigation.

The nine theologians issued unanimous approval for the cause at their meeting at 5:00pm on 4 December 2014. The congregation's Promoter of the Faith Carlo Pellegrino chaired the meeting of the theologians and referred the cause to the cardinal and bishop members of the congregation for their decision. The congregation's prefect Cardinal Angelo Amato chaired the meeting of the C.C.S. on 15 December 2015 in which approval was granted for the cause after looking over the Positio. He was proclaimed to be Venerable after Pope Francis confirmed his heroic virtue and named him as Venerable on 17 December 2015.

Medical experts confirmed a miracle attributed to him on 28 March 2019. Pope Francis later confirmed a miracle attributed to him on 28 November 2019 which enables for the late priest to be beatified. The celebration had been first scheduled to be held in Kalongo on 22 November 2020 and then it was announced that due to the worldwide COVID-19 pandemic the beatification would be postponed to 21 November 2021. But that was postponed once more with ruminations about an Easter date in 2022 until it was confirmed on 7 February 2022 that the beatification would be celebrated on 20 November 2022.

The current postulator for this cause is the Comboni priest Arnaldo Baritussio.

== See also ==
- Agago District
- Acholiland
- Roman Catholic Archdiocese of Gulu
