= Agoro Community Development Association =

The Agoro Community Development Association (ACDA) is a Non-governmental organization (NGO) that assists the rural Agoro community in northern Uganda’s Lamwo and Kitgum districts. These districts have a religiously and culturally diverse population of over 600,000, most of whom are Acholi. Post Ugandan Independence in 1962, the area has suffered almost continual conflict, persecution & neglect, much of it based on ethnic tensions. Socioculturally, there has traditionally been deep gender inequality and power imbalance between men and women. Sexual violence, child marriage, and lack of respect for property rights against girls and women remain prevalent but silent crimes.

The Agoro region has endured years of civil and tribal violence from the time of Ugandan independence, which has devastated the community and upset its way of life. Thousands have been killed or forced into fighting for rebel factions, the most active in recent years being the Lord's Resistance Army, which is estimated to have abducted over 25,000 boys and girls. Many of the remainder have been affected as a result of harsh government treatment of the Acholi in reaction to the LRA. At one time, it was estimated that over 1.8 million people across Northern Uganda were displaced by the conflict, many of them in the area where ACDA operates. Even though relative peace has been restored in recent years, many of those who left have never returned. The prolonged conflict, compounded by the impact of changing climatic conditions, has significantly affected area farming, the primary means of subsistence for over 90% of the population.

In recent years, ongoing disturbances in South Sudan have resulted in a large number of refugees and asylum seekers arriving in the area. As of December 2015, the UN estimated that there are over 173,000 refugees and asylum seekers in Northern Uganda, many of whom are in the Agoro region. HIV/AIDS remains a major problem, with an estimated 8.2% of the area population being infected with the virus at year-end 2014. The combination of all these factors has resulted in most area residents suffering from extreme poverty and vulnerability.

ACDA was founded in 2001 as a consequence of the ongoing disruption that was threatening the social fabric of the area. Since its formation, the organization's mission has remained unchanged:" To provide a voice for the oppressed & disadvantaged members of the community in the Agoro Region & to lobby for support & undertake projects to alleviate and improve their situation."

Since its formation, ACDA has been active on a number of fronts, working on its own and with international aid agencies on projects in support of the local population, as well as displaced persons from conflict in South Sudan. Achievements to date include:

- Establishment of an Early Child Development Centre (EDC) in Agoro subcounty with support from UNICEF in 2005
- Training of block leaders in 10 IDP camps from Lamwo district with support from the Norwegian Refugee Council (NRC)
- Completion of human rights awareness education with support from the NRC's ICLA project
- A project to enhance Girls' Secondary Education with support from WTE Canada
- Training of community leaders on fundamental human rights in partnership with the Kitgum NGO forum (KINGFO)
- HIV/AIDS community mobilization and sensitization in partnership with Oxfam GB
- Child and enforced marriage prevention and cultural awareness, gender equality & vocational training with support from the Canada Fund for Local Initiatives program
- ACDA supported UNICEF in the implementation of projects on Early Child Development (ECD) in Agoro IDP camp, Agoro Subcounty

ACDA operates on a 5-year plan, which is updated annually. The 5-year goal is for ACDA to continue being recognized as a major force in bringing about change for Agoro residents and to be seen by all as a trusted institution that continues to support and enhance the quality of life for all. Current efforts are taking advantage of the uptake of wireless communications by Agoro residents to enhance ACDA's ability to serve its membership.

Within the current plan, ACDA's main objectives are:

1. To break down gender & cultural barriers by promoting respect, learning, encouraging participation & engagement in community & political processes, & empowering the community to successfully represent issues & demand accountability from public leaders.
2. Provide training that gives community members, especially women and youth, knowledge about human & property rights, gender equality, democratic and economic processes & freedoms & how they can seek justice/equality by holding their leaders accountable.
3. Build capacity through training in the practical utilization of mobile technologies in creating, publishing, and accessing information. The intent is to use this training to educate community members on where they can find information that helps resolve issues.
4. Through vocational training, provide vulnerable groups with skills and knowledge that they can use to improve their quality of life. This will include new agricultural techniques & skills-based training that will help women & youth develop economic independence.
