= Makmot Otto =

Ugandan politician

Honorable

Personal details
- Born: Makmot Edward Otto; 2 August 1978 (age 48) Agago, Uganda
- Citizenship: Uganda
- Spouse: Dr. Josephine Okwera Otto
- Education: University of Toronto (Doctor of Jurisprudence); Makerere University (Bachelor of Laws)
- Occupation: Lawyer, politician
- Known for: lawyer, politician

Hon Makmot Edward Otto (born 2 August 1978) is a Ugandan-Canadian barrister, solicitor, notary public, member of the Law Society of Ontario, Canadian Bar Association, and an advocate of the Uganda Law Society and East African Law Society, and politician. He was elected to the 10th elected Parliament of Uganda for Agago County an independent candidate. He succeeded John Okot Amos, who was preceded by the former Leader of the Opposition Professor Ogenga Latigo and Chief Justice Owiny Dollo. He served as the vice chairperson of the Committee on Rules, Privileges And Discipline and a member of the Legal and Parliamentary Affairs Committee in the 10th Parliament.

Otto is the founder of Otto, Barrister, Solicitor and Notary and a partner M/s Otto, Barrister, Solicitor & Notary and co-founder of Otto & Sherman Professional Corporation, a Canadian law firm. and also Ms Otto Edward Makmot & Company Advocates based in Kampala, Uganda. Otto is the proprietor of Radio Wang ooh FM 93.3 FM in Agago District and founding members of the Board of David Fagerlee Medical Centre based in Agago Commissioned by President Museveni in 2017. He serves as a panel member for Legal Aid Ontario. He is a member of the Law Society of Upper Canada, Canadian Association of Black Lawyers, Canadian/Ontario Bar Association, York Regional Law Association and the Advocates' Circle. Otto served as a secretary on the board of trustees of the Ugandan North American Association (UNAA) from 2015 to 2017. He was a cabinet minister in charge of production for the 2001/2002 Makerere University Guild Government,.

== Early life and education ==
Otto was born in Agago District, Acholi sub-region, on 2 August 1978. The son of Mzee Aldo Davidson Otto and Veronica Adong Otto, he was raised in a Catholic family of the Acholi. His primary education was interrupted by the Lord's Resistance Army insurgency in the region at the time, and he fled to Kampala, Uganda's capital, where he sat his primary leaving examinations at Bat Valley Primary school.

After his O-Levels he attended St. Mary's College Kisubi for A-Level education., then attended Makerere University (MUK), where he attained a Bachelor of Laws degree in 2002. Otto also attended the University of Toronto and attained a Doctor of Jurisprudence degree in 2008. He was an associate editor of the Journal of International Law and International Relations (JILIR) there.

== Career ==
After attaining his bachelors degree at Makerere University in 2002, Otto was employed as a case worker at Downtown Legal Services, a community legal clinic and a clinical education program, operated by the Faculty of Law at the University of Toronto. In 2005 he enrolled for further studies at the Canadian university, and was admitted to the Bar program in the Province of Ontario, Canada after attaining a JD from University of Toronto.

He was enrolled as a solicitor for the Court of Appeal for Ontario, called to the bar, and admitted to practice at the Court system of Canada in Ontario on 15 June 2010. Otto articled with HOUSEN, Barrister, Solicitor and Notary then worked as a client service representative for Legal Aid Ontario in 2010, before founding Otto, Barrister, Solicitor and Notary where he worked as a barrister and solicitor until 2015. He is also a partner and co-founder of Otto & Sherman Professional Corporation.

In 2015, Otto joined elective politics and went on to win the parliamentary seat for Agago County as an independent member of parliament in the 2016 general elections that ushered in the 10th Parliament of Uganda.

In the 10th Parliament, Otto serves on the Committee on Rules, Privileges and Discipline and the Legal and Parliamentary Affairs Committee. He is the general secretary of independents or non-partisan members of parliament, a member of: the Forum for Quality Health; the Legal and Leadership Forum; the Forum for Environment; the Acholi Parliamentary Group and; the Uganda Parliamentary Prayer Breakfast Fellowship.

== Personal details ==
Makmot Edward Otto is married to Dr. Josephine Okwera Otto, a Director, Health and Social Services with Uganda Redcross. They have three children; Elizabeth Veronica Otto, Esther Teresa Otto and Megan Hannah Otto.

== See also ==
- Agago District
