= Lagen David Atuka =

Ugandan politician

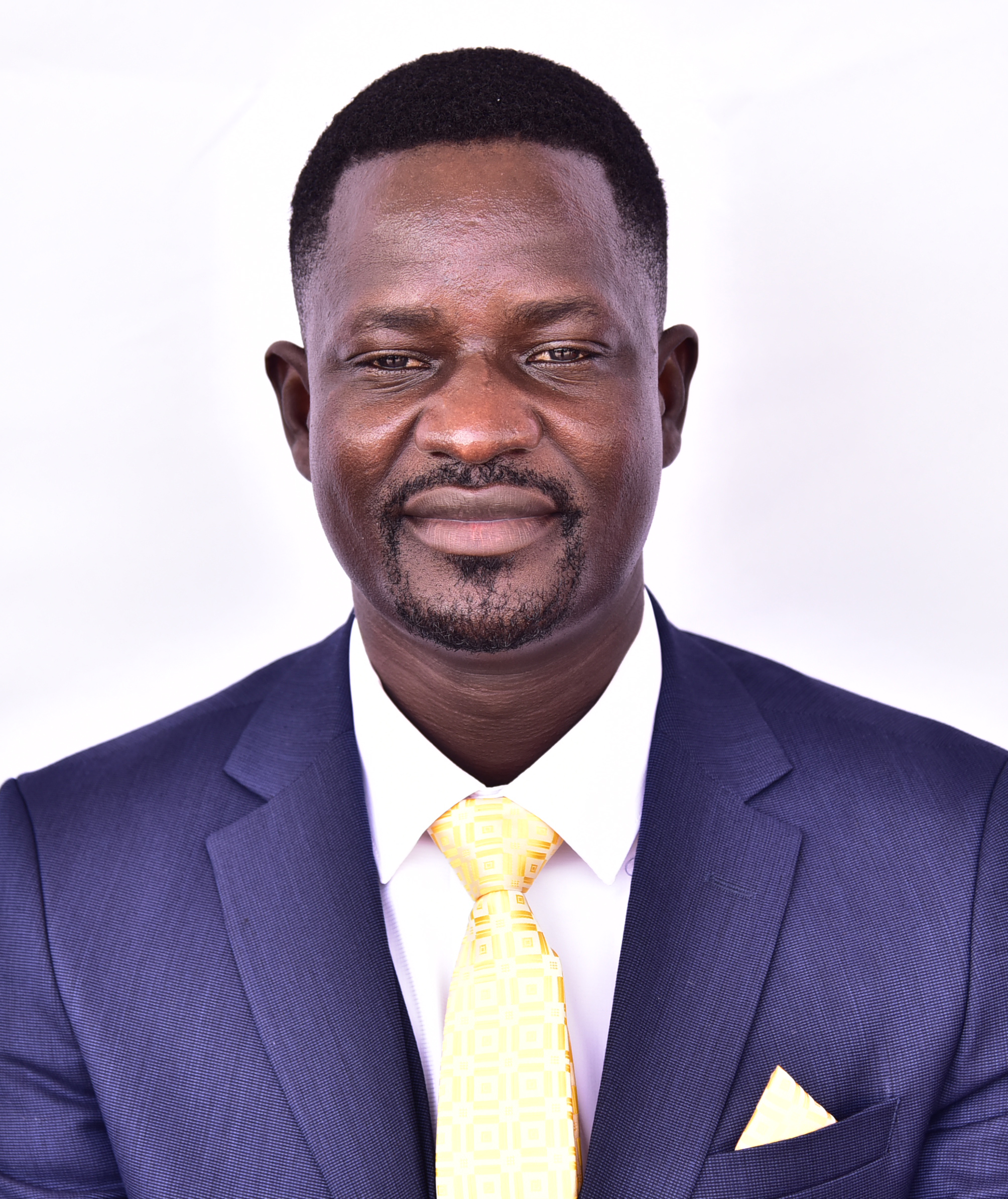
- Lagen David Atuka

Member of Parliament for Agago Constituency
- Incumbent
- Assumed office 2021
- Preceded by: Makmot Otto

Personal details
- Occupation: Politician

Lagen David Atuka is a politician from Uganda who is the member of 11th Parliament of Uganda from Agago Constituency. In the current election he got 9,300 votes and succeeded Makmot Otto who got 8,700 votes. Lagen supervises government development programs like Parish Development Model to reduce poverty in Uganda.

== See Also ==
- Thomas Tayebwa
- Anita Among
- Jane Ruth Aceng
