= Patongo, Uganda =

Patongo
- Map of Uganda showing the location of Patongo
- Coordinates: 02°45′36″N 33°18′36″E
- Country: Uganda
- Region: Northern Region of Uganda
- Sub-region: Acholi sub-region
- District: Agago District
- Elevation: 1,035 m (3,396 ft)
- Time zone: UTC+3 (EAT)

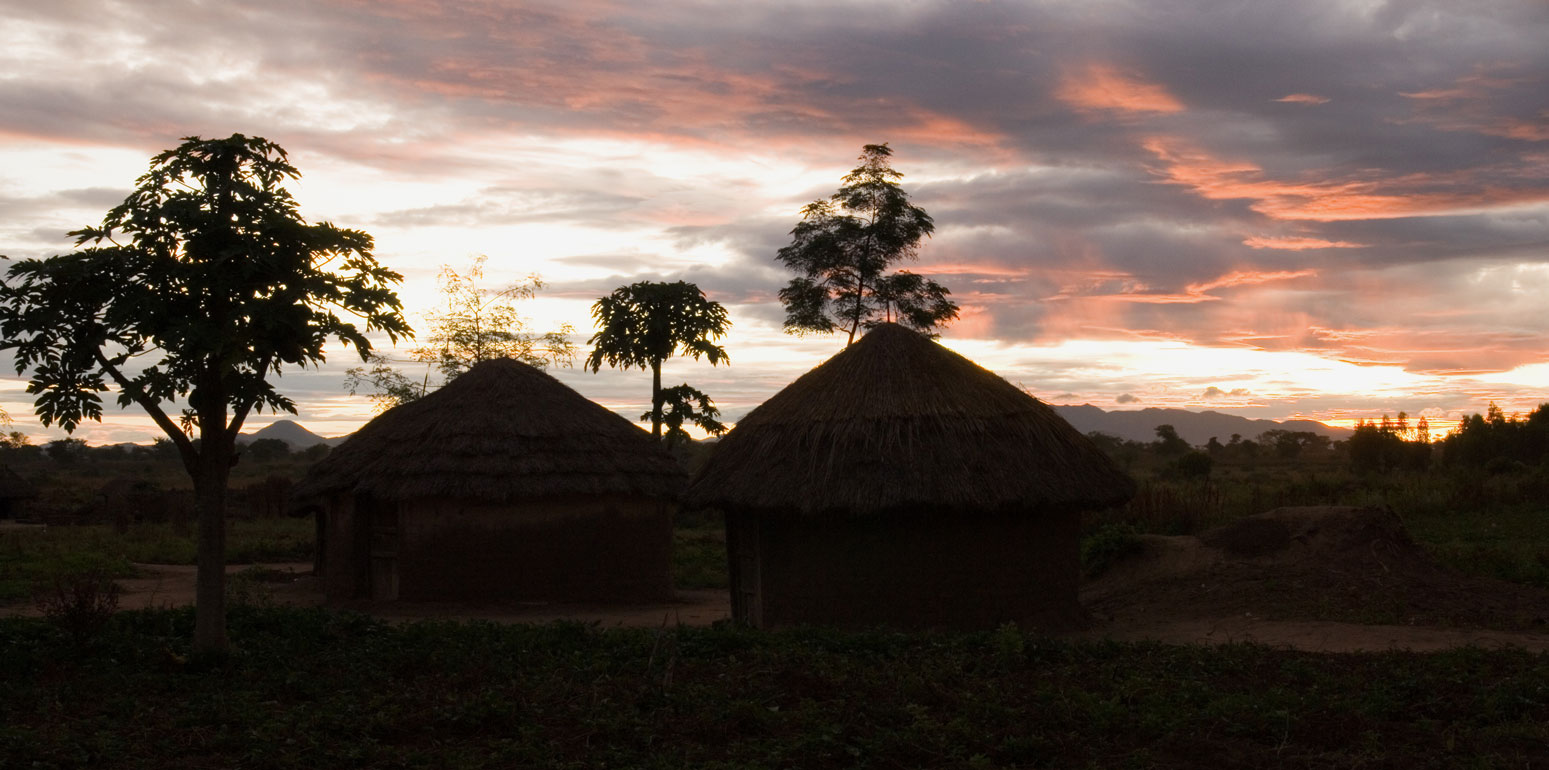
Sunrise in Patongo internally displaced persons camp, Agago District

Patongo is a town in Agago District, Acholi sub-region in the Northern Region of Uganda. The town is administered by Patongo Town Council.

== Location ==
Patongo is approximately 21.5 kilometres (13.4 mi), by road, south of Agago, the site of the district headquarters. The coordinates of the town are 2°45'36.0"N, 33°18'36.0"E (Latitude:2.7600; Longitude:33.3100). Patongo lies at an average elevation of 1,035 metres (3,396 ft), above sea level.

== Overview ==
The town of Patongo was formed during the 2000s along with Pader and Pader District. Initially the location of a large camp for internally displaced people as a result of the Lord's Resistance Army insurgency, Patongo was granted town council status by the Ugandan parliament effective July 2010. In 2010, when Pader District was divided to create Agago District, Patongo went with Agago District.

== Points of interest ==
The following additional points of interest are located within or near the town of Patongo:

- Patongo central market
- Kilak-Moroto road, going through the middle of town
- offices of Paorinher Orphanage, a non-governmental organization
- Gwoke Keni, an HIV/AIDS support group that hosts its own RootIO radio station on 103.8FM.

== See also ==
- List of cities and towns in Uganda
