= Lamwo =

- Map of Uganda showing the location of Lamwo
- Coordinates: 03°31′48″N 32°48′00″E
- Country: Uganda
- Region: Northern Region of Uganda
- Sub-region: Acholi sub-region
- District: Lamwo District
- Elevation: 1,100 m (3,600 ft)
- Time zone: UTC+3 (EAT)

Lamwo is a town in the Northern Region of Uganda and the political and administrative center of Lamwo District.

== Location ==
Lamwo lies 66 kilometres (41 mi) northwest of Kitgum, the nearest large town and 468 kilometres (291 mi) north of Kampala, Uganda's capital and largest city. The approximate coordinates of the town are 03 31 48N, 32 48 00E (Latitude:3.5300; Longitude:32.800).

== Points of interest ==
The following points of interest lie within or near the town limits:

- offices of Lamwo Town Council
- Lamwo central market
- Lamwo-Kitgum road

== See also ==
- Acholi sub-region
- Agoro Community Development Association
