= Kalongo =

- Map of Uganda showing the location of Kalongo
- Coordinates: 03°02′24″N 33°22′16″E
- Country: Uganda
- Region: Northern Region of Uganda
- Sub-region: Acholi sub-region
- District: Agago District
- Elevation: 1,100 m (3,600 ft)

Population (2011 Estimate)
  - Total: 15,000
- Time zone: UTC+3 (EAT)

Kalongo is a town in the Northern Region of Uganda. It is one of the urban centers in Agago District.

== Location ==
Kalongo is located in the Acholi sub-region. It is approximately 71 kilometres (44 mi) southeast of Kitgum, the nearest large town. This is approximately 159 kilometres (99 mi), by road, northeast of Gulu, the largest city in the sub-region. The coordinates of Kalongo, Uganda are 3° 2' 24.00"N, 33° 22' 16.00"E (Latitude:3.04000; Longitude:33.37111).

== Population ==
The 2002 national population census estimated the town's population at 9,700. In 2010, the Uganda Bureau of Statistics (UBOS) estimated the population at 14,300. In 2011, UBOS estimated the mid-year population at 15,000.

In 2015, the population of the town was projected at 11,800. In 2020, the mid-year population of the town was projected at 12,800, with 6,900 (53.9 percent) females and 5,900 (46.1 percent) males. It was calculated that the population of the town increased at an average annual rate of 1.9 percent, between 2015 and 2020.

Historical population
Year	Pop.	±%
2002	9,700	—
2010	14,300	+47.4%
2011	15,000	+4.9%
2015	11,800	−21.3%
2020	12,800	+8.5%

== Points of interest ==
The following points of interest are found in the town of Kalongo, or near the edges of the town:

1. Theoffices of Kalongo Town Council

2. Kalongo central market

3. Kalongo School of Nursing & Midwifery, a nursing and midwifery school affiliated with and administered by the Dr. Ambrosoli Memorial Hospital

4. Mount Kalongo, a solid rock formation that rises to a peak of 1,600 metres (5,200 ft) above sea-level, towering approximately 400 metres (1,300 ft) to the northwest of town

5. St. Charles Lwanga College, a mixed, boarding, secondary school (S1 - S6) affiliated with the Catholic Church

6. Kalongo Airstrip, a private airstrip owned and administered by the Dr. Ambrosoli Memorial Hospital

7. St. Mary's School of Midwivery, affiliated with the Dr. Ambrosoli Memorial Hospital, with 120 students in 2011

8. Dr. Ambrosoli Memorial Hospital, a 350-bed community hospital administered by the Roman Catholic Archdiocese of Gulu

== See also ==
- Agago
- List of cities and towns in Uganda
