= Agago =

- Town
- Map of Uganda showing the location of Agago.
- Coordinates: 02°59′05″N 33°19′50″E
- Country: Uganda
- Region: Northern Region
- Sub-region: Acholi sub-region
- District: Agago District
- Elevation: 1,080 m (3,540 ft)

Population (2024 Census)
  - Total: 7,946
- Time zone: UTC+3 (EAT)

Agago is a town in the Northern Region of Uganda. It is the chief political, administrative, and commercial center of the Agago District.

== Location ==
Agago lies 90 kilometres (56 mi) south-east of Kitgum, the nearest large town and 137 kilometres (85 mi) east of Gulu, the largest city in the Acholi sub-region. The geographic coordinates of the town are 2°59'05.0"N, 33°19'50.0"E (Latitude:2.9847; Longitude:33.3306).

== History and administration ==
Agago District was created from Pader District in July 2010, with its headquarters at Agago Town Council. The district’s local government structure includes 13 sub-counties and 3 town councils.

== Population ==
In 2015, the projected population of the town was 6,100. In 2020, the mid-year population was projected at 6,700. It was calculated that the population of Agago Municipality grew at an average annual rate of 1.9 percent, between 2015 and 2020 and over 30 percent between 2015 and 2024.

Historical population
Year	Pop.	±%
2015	6,100	—
2020	6,700	+9.8%
2024	7,946	+18.6%

== Infrastructure ==
=== Electricity ===
Uganda Electricity Transmission Company Limited (UETCL) lists the “Gulu-Agago 132kV Transmission Line and Associated Substations Project” as under implementation, noting the line was energized on 18 November 2023 and commissioning at the new Agago 132/33kV substation took place on 21 February 2024.

=== Roads and air transport ===
A Government of Uganda hazard and vulnerability profile for the district reports a road network of 1,131 km (classified/trunk, district, and community access roads) and notes three airstrips in the district (Kalongo Town Council, Patongo Town Council, and Arum Sub-county).

== Climate ==
The same profile describes a wet season from April to October and a dry season from November to March, reporting annual rainfall around 1,330 mm and average monthly temperatures of about 29°C (maximum) and 17°C (minimum).

== Points of interest ==
The following points of interest lie within the town limits or close to the edges of town: (a) the offices of Agago Town Council (b) Agago central market and (c) the Kalongo-Patongo road, passing to the immediate east of town in a north–south direction.

== See also ==
- Patongo
- Adilang
- Acholi people
- Agago District
