= A Brilliant Genocide =

- Directed by: Ebony Butler
- Produced by: Ebony Butler; Jason Byrne
- Starring: Milton Alimadi; Josephine Apira; Joseph Okumu; Paska Aryemo
- Cinematography: Marcus Dineen
- Edited by: Ebony Butler; Ken Sallows
- Music by: James Brown
- Production company: Atlantic Star Productions
- Release date: 11 March 2016
- Running time: 82 minutes
- Countries: Australia, Uganda
- Languages: English, Acholi

A Brilliant Genocide is a 2016 documentary film produced by Atlantic Star Productions. The purpose of the film is to reveal atrocities committed against the Acholi people by the Government of Uganda, and its President Yoweri Museveni, under the guise of crushing a rebellion by Joseph Kony's Lord's Resistance Army (LRA). The film is a counterpoint to the 2012 documentary short film Kony 2012. It was directed by Ebony Butler.

The film covers a forgotten war described by Jan Egland as one of the most neglected human crises of modern times, and brings out a perspective not always seen in films relying on official discourses.

== Film festival selection ==
- Palm Beach International Film Festival (7 April 2016, Nominated—Best Feature Documentary)
- LA Women's International Film Festival (27 March 2016, Won—Best Feature Documentary)
- Hollywood International Independent Documentary Awards (12 March 2016, Won—Best Feature Documentary)
- DC Independent Film Festival (11 March 2016, world premiere)

== See also ==
- Kony 2012
