= Jeremiah Lucas Opira =

Ugandan politician

Jeremiah Lucas Opira (August 28, 1933 – November 22, 2000) was a Ugandan politician and the National Executive Secretary of the Uganda National Liberation Front (UNLF) 1979–1980. The UNLF and its military wing UNLA removed Idi Amin from power with the support of the Tanzania People's Defence Force on April 11, 1979. He contributed to the movement that helped Uganda gain independence from Great Britain in 1962. He worked for consolidation of national unity in Uganda and the return of kingdoms which he believed would be a unifying factor in Uganda. He instigated investigations into the Ugandan and East African pre-European history, and wrote articles on this subject and on African politics.

== Biography ==
Jeremiah Opira was born in Namokora, Kitgum District in Chua County, Acholi, Northern Uganda. He received his primary education at the Church Mission Society (CMS Kitgum Primary School) and later in Kenya at Ribe Methodist Junior Secondary School, Mombasa, and Shimo La Tewa Senior Secondary School. Prior to his political career, he worked as a teacher and headmaster after qualifying in 1953 from Uganda Teachers College Buwalasi. He became popularly known in his native Luo as "Lapwony" which means teacher. He later pursued the Cambridge School Certificate Examination, which he completed in 1959.

After joining the Ugandan government, Opira studied at the Institute of Public Administration, Office of the Prime Minister of Israel (1963–1964). He was later appointed Assistant Secretary in the Office of the Prime Minister of Uganda and received promotions, including one for saving the life of the King Sir Edward Mutesa II from an assassination attempt by Idi Amin in 1966. Opira also served as Organisation of African Unity expert during the Congo crisis. By January 1971, he was the Deputy Chief General Service Officer/Deputy Permanent Cabinet Secretary and Functional Chief Political Advisor in the Office of the President. He fled Uganda and went into exile immediately after the military coup in 1971. He spent the first years of exile in Tanzania, yet was detained for political reasons and imprisoned for 18 months between 1972–1974.

In 1974, he left East Africa for exile in Sweden. While in Sweden he studied economics and political science at the post-graduate level. He obtained a Swedish Fil.kand. degree from Lund University. In 1977, his maternal uncle Archbishop Janani Luwum was murdered along with two cabinet ministers, Erenayo Wilson Oryema and Charles Oboth Ofumbi. Opira played a key role in founding the UNLF and facilitating the Moshi Conference that led to the fall of Idi Amin. He was subsequently appointed National Executive Secretary (1979–1980). During the 1980 general elections, he campaigned briefly as vice-chairman of the Uganda Patriotic Movement. Due to conditions in Uganda and the death of his youngest son, he left once again for Sweden in September of the same year, before elections were held. He later returned to Uganda in 1985 and was appointed Chief Executive Director of the Uganda Board of Trade. He died of heart failure in November 2000 and was survived by his widow, "Mama Sammy," whom he married on New Year's Eve 1955, and their children.
