= Beatrice Akello Akori =

Ugandan politician

Hon Beatrice Akello
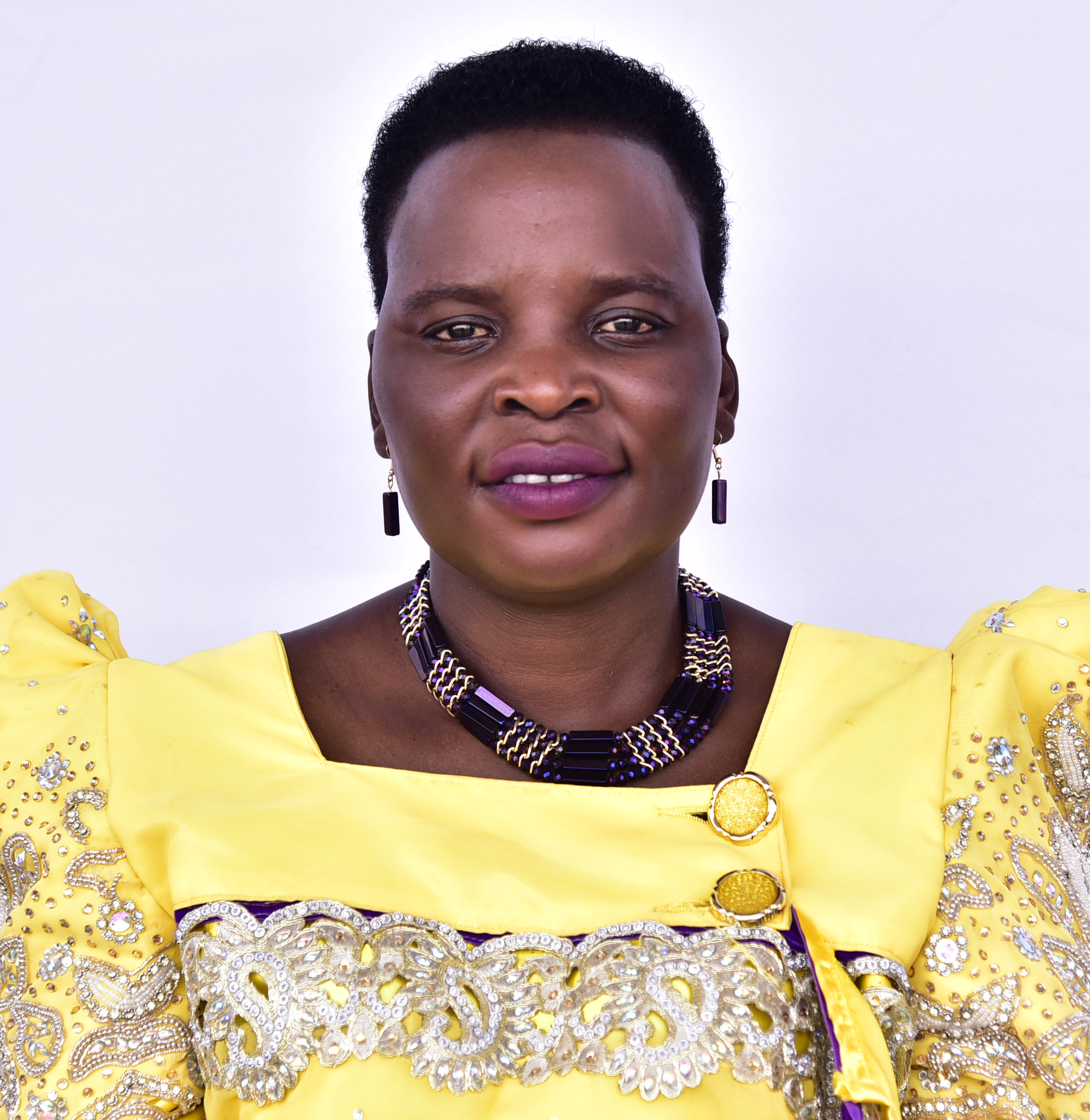
- Citizenship: Ugandan
- Occupation: Politician
- Employers: Apac District; Agago district
- Known for: Politics
- Title: Honourable
- Political party: National Resistance Movement

Beatrice Akello Akori is a Ugandan politician. She is a woman member of parliament in the eleventh Parliament of Uganda (2021–26), serving as a member of the ruling National Resistance Movement party.

== Career ==
Beatrice Akello Akori was the Resident District Commissioner for Apac District. In 2020 she also chaired the Apac District taskforce for COVID-19.

In the 2021 general election, she was elected as a woman representative in parliament for Agago district. She received 31,450 votes to beat the previous woman MP for Agago, Judith Franca Akello (FDC), who received 26,564 votes.

In 2022 she was appointed Minister of State for Economic Monitoring in the Cabinet of Uganda.

== See also ==
- List of members of the eleventh Parliament of Uganda.
- Agago District.
- Apac District
- National Resistance Movement
- Parliament of Uganda.
- Member of Parliament.
