= Pader, Uganda =

Pader
- Map of Uganda showing the location of Pader
- Coordinates: 02°52′40″N 33°05′06″E
- Country: Uganda
- Region: Northern Uganda
- Sub-region: Acholi sub-region
- District: Pader District
- Elevation: 1,020 m (3,350 ft)

Population (2014 Census)
  - Total: 14,080
- Time zone: UTC+3 (EAT)

Pader is a town in Pader District in the Northern Region of Uganda. The town is administered by the Pader Town Council, an urban local government. It is the largest metropolitan area in the district and the site of the district headquarters.

== Geography ==
Pader is bordered by Pajule to the north, Parabong to the northeast, Lira Palwo to the east, Puranga to the south, and Awere to the west. The town is approximately 60 kilometres (37 mi), by road, southeast of Kitgum, the nearest large town. Pader is approximately 133 kilometres (83 mi), by road, east of Gulu, the largest city in the Northern Region of Uganda. The coordinates of the town are 2°52'43.0"N, 33°05'06.0"E (Latitude:2.8786; Longitude:33.0850).

== Overview ==
Pader sprang up in 2000, the same year that Pader District was formed. The town soon became a center of foreign relief agencies assisting the civilian population affected by the Lord's Resistance Army insurgency. While over US$2 million has been poured into this effort, there is little to show for it because of corruption, poor planning, poor implementation, poor follow up, poor management, lack of accountability, and a hands-off approach by many of the donor agencies.

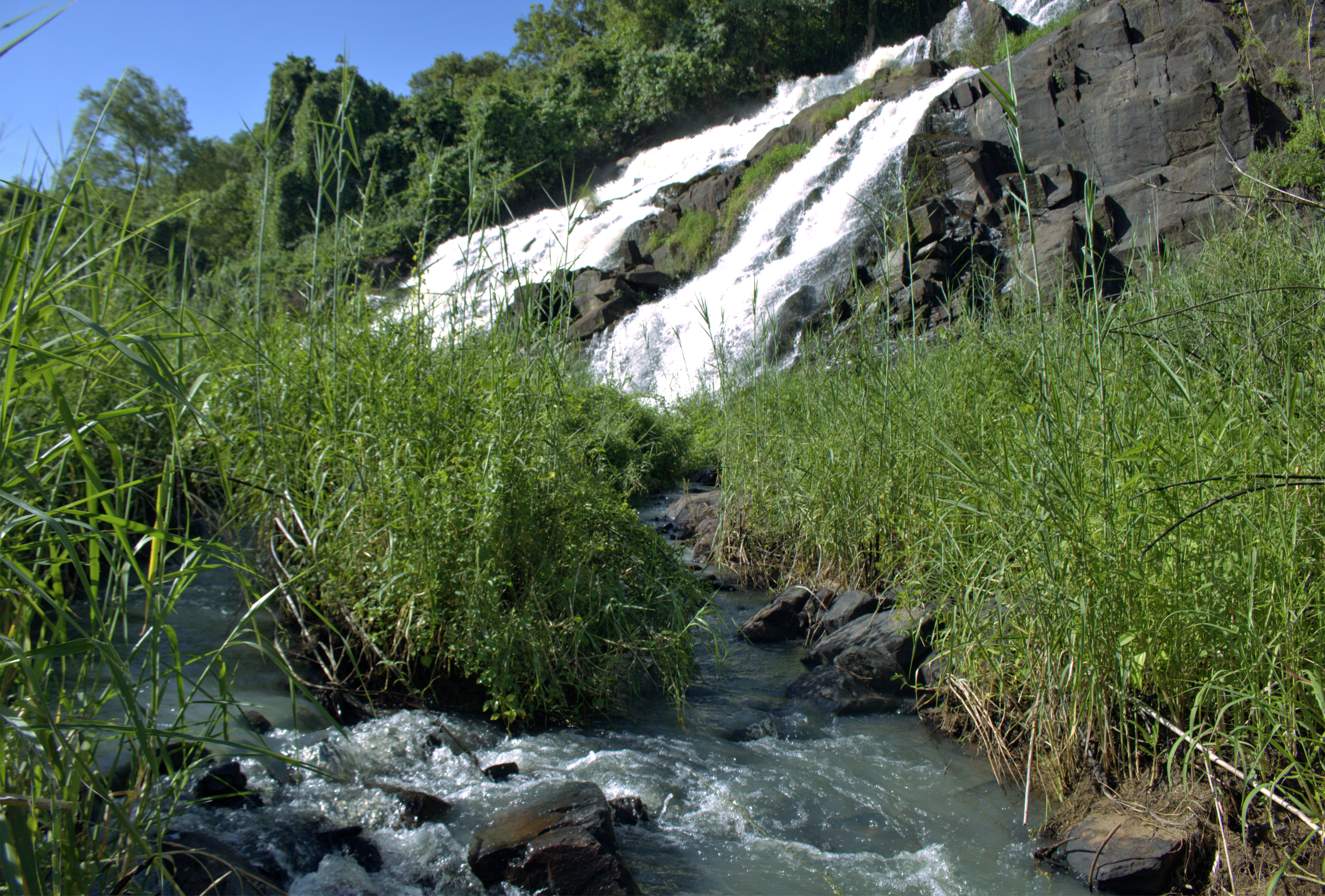
Aruu Falls waterfalls situated in the Northern part of Uganda along the Gulu Kitgum highway in Pader district.

== Population ==
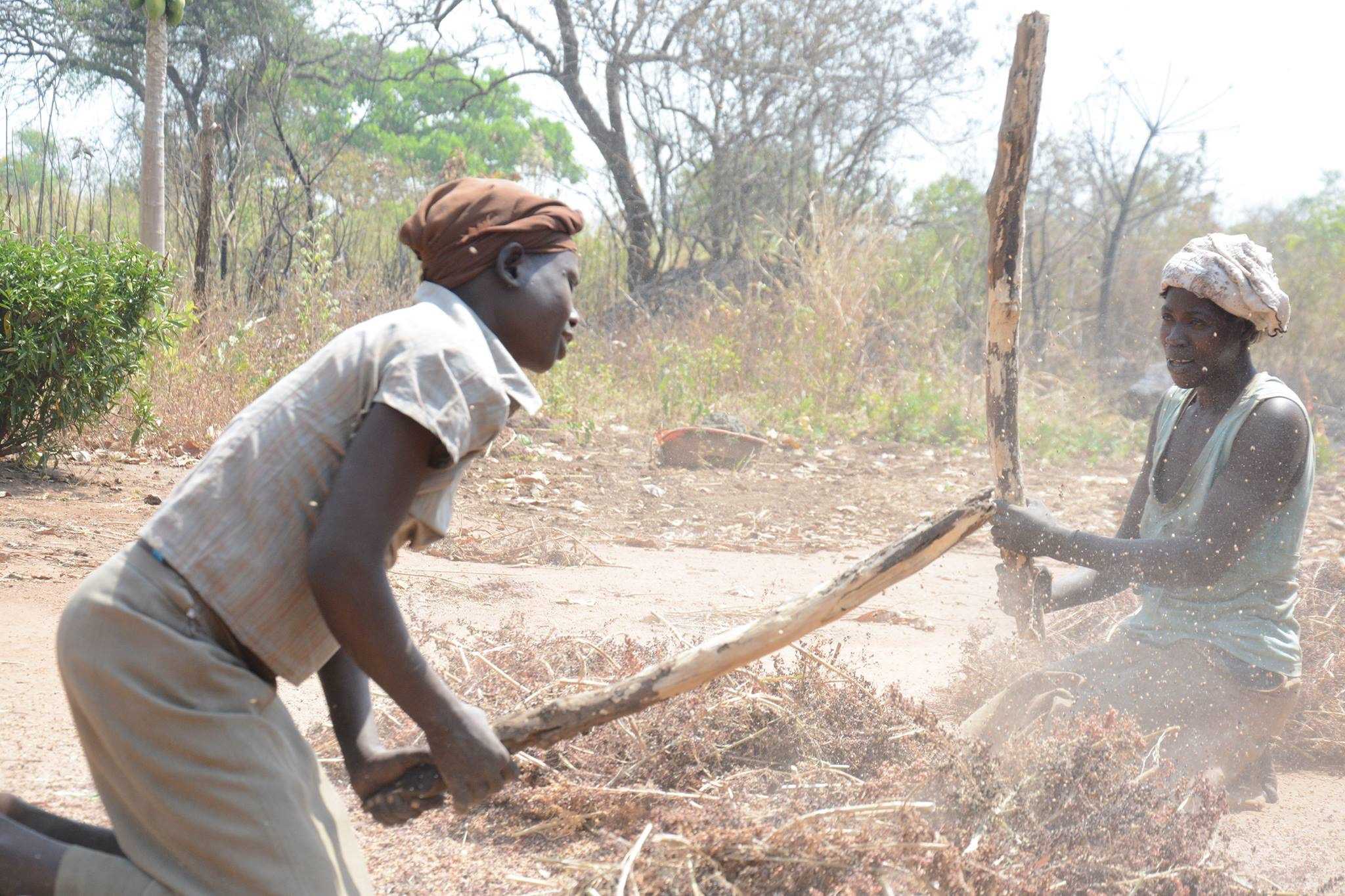
Women of Pader pounding sorghum

The 2002 national census estimated the population of the town at about 8,700. The Uganda Bureau of Statistics (UBOS) estimated the population at 12,800 in 2010. In 2011, UBOS estimated the mid-year population at 13,500. The 2014 census enumerated the population of the town at 14,080.

In 2015, the population of the town was projected at 13,500. In 2020, the mid-year population of Pader Town was projected at 14,800. It was calculated that the population of the town increased at an average annual rate of 1.9 percent, between 2015 and 2020.

Historical population
Year	Pop.	±%
2002	8,700	—
2010	12,800	+47.1%
2011	14,500	+13.3%
2014	14,080	−2.9%
2015	13,500	−4.1%
2020	14,800	+9.6%

== Points of interest ==
The following additional points of interest lie within or near the town of Pader:

- headquarters of the 5th Division of the Uganda People's Defence Force
- Olwor Nguur Primary School
- Pader Girls Academy
- Archbishop Flynn Secondary School
- Paipir Primary School
- Pader Kilak Primary School
- Pader central market
- Ayoro restaurant
- Kalongo Hospital, a 200-bed community hospital administered by the Roman Catholic Archdiocese of Gulu and located 46 kilometres (29 mi), by road, northeast of town

== See also ==
- Acholi sub-region
- List of cities and towns in Uganda
- List of roads in Uganda
