= Kilek =

Kilek كيلك
- Village
- Location within Iran
- Coordinates: 35°10′10″N 47°00′35″E
- Country: Iran
- Province: Kurdistan
- County: Sanandaj
- Bakhsh: Central
- Rural District: Naran

Population (2006)
  - Total: 91
- Time zone: UTC+3:30 (IRST)
  - Summer (DST): UTC+4:30 (IRDT)

Kilek (Persian: كيلك, also Romanized as Kīlek, Keylak, and Kīlak; also known as Kīlīg) is a village in Naran Rural District, in the Central District of Sanandaj County, Kurdistan Province, Iran. At the 2006 census, its population was 91, in 22 families. The village is populated by Kurds.
