= Emmanuel Amey Ojara =

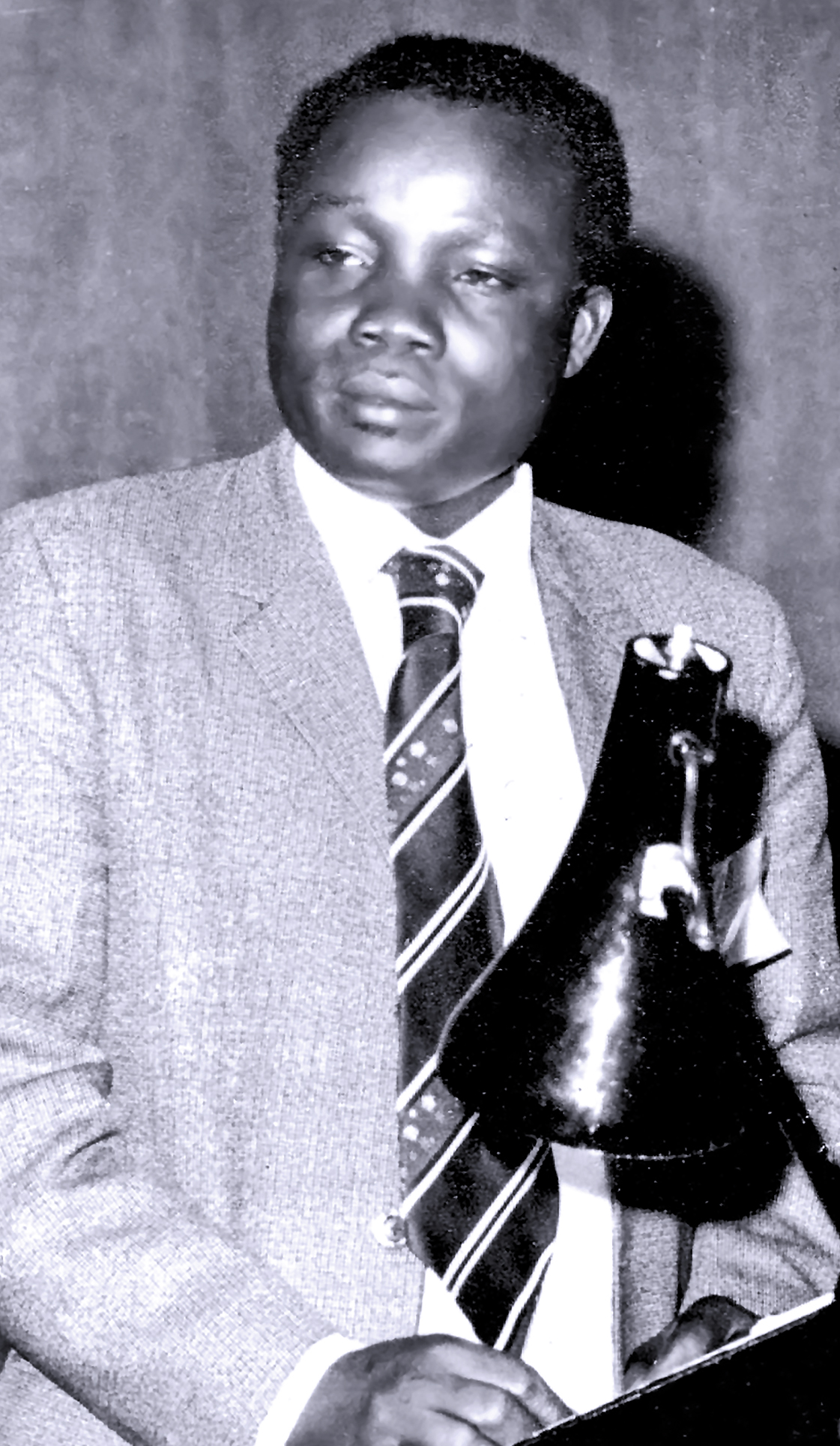
- Ojara addressing a session of the Association of Surgeons of East Africa - ASEA, (now merged into the College of Surgeons of East, Central and Southern Africas - COSECSA).
- Born: 10 February 1944; Layibi, Gulu District, Uganda
- Died: 26 July 1987 (aged 43); Nairobi Hospital, Nairobi, Kenya
- Citizenship: Uganda
- Education: Makerere University (Bachelor of Medicine and Bachelor of Surgery) (Master of Medicine in surgery)
- Occupations: Medical doctor, surgeon & university lecturer
- Years active: 1972 - 1987
- Known for: Surgical skills
- Title: Senior Lecturer; University of Nairobi
- Spouse: Agnes Mary Waithira Ojara

Emmanuel Amey Ojara (10 February 1944 – 26 July 1987) was a medical doctor, surgeon, and oncologist in East Africa. At the time of his death, he was a senior lecturer at the University of Nairobi, School of Medicine.

== Background ==
Ojara was born to Simeon Oyoo and Yudia Akidi Oyoo at Layibi Village, Gulu District, approximately 6 kilometres (3.7 mi), by road, southwest of the central business district of Gulu, the largest city in the Northern Region of Uganda.

== Education ==
After attending primary school locally, he entered Gulu Junior School and in 1960, transferred to Samuel Baker Secondary School. He completed both his O-Level and A-Level studies at this school, graduating in 1965. In 1966, he was admitted to the Makerere University School of Medicine, the oldest medical school in Uganda. In 1971, he graduated with a Bachelor of Medicine and Bachelor of Surgery degree. Following one year of internship and another year of practice as a medical officer, he was accepted into the postgraduate Master of Medicine program, a collaborative undertaking between Makerere University and the Mulago National Referral Hospital. In 1976, he was awarded a Master of Medicine in Surgery degree.

== Career ==
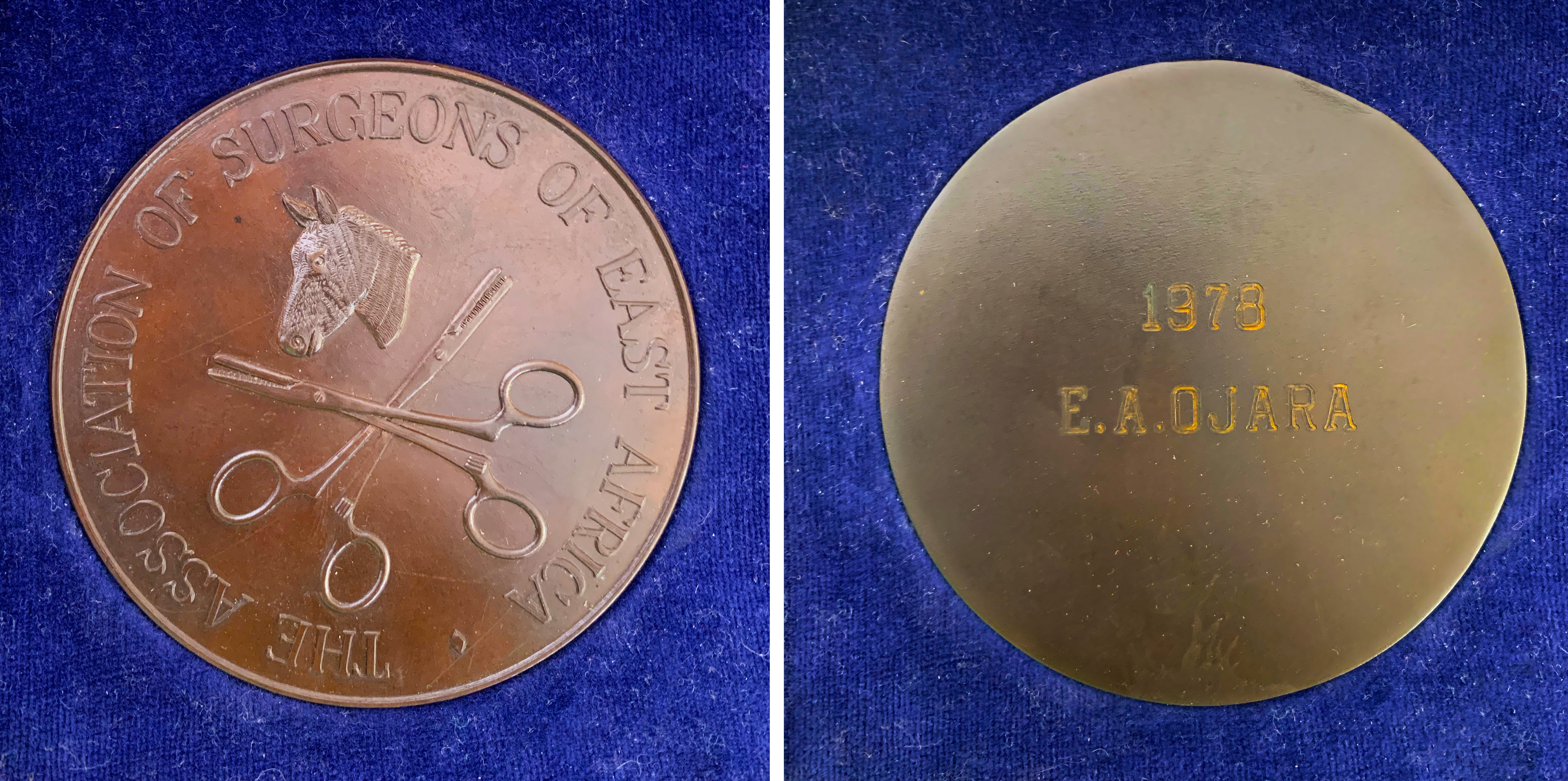
A copper medallion engraved ’1978 - E. A. OJARA’ that was awarded to Dr. Emmanuel Amey Ojara by the Association of Surgeons of East Africa - ASEA, in recognition of the progress of his research regarding a cure for cancer. (ASEA was established in 1950 and ceased to exist in 2007 when it merged into College of Surgeons of East, Central and Southern Africas - COSECSA).

Following his first degree, he worked as an intern at Mulago Hospital from 1971 until 1972. He then worked as a medical officer for the Uganda Ministry of Health, stationed at Butabika Hospital in Kampala, from 1972 until 1973. In 1973, when he entered the Master of Medicine in Surgery program, Makerere University appointed him an assistant lecturer, a title he carried until his graduation in 1976, when he was promoted to lecturer.

In 1977, at the height of Idi Amin's brutality, Ojara and his family fled to neighbouring Kenya. He was appointed lecturer at the University of Nairobi School of Medicine and registrar at Kenyatta National Hospital, the teaching hospital of the medical school. At the time of his death, he had been promoted to senior lecturer at the medical school and had begun a research towards a cure for cancer. His research interests centred around intestinal cancer.

== Other considerations ==
In 1968, while in his third year of medical school, he married Agnes Waithera who was a Bachelor of Education student at Makerere. Together, they were the parents of three sons and one daughter (Patrick Otim, John Ojara, Michael Oyoo and Stellah Adoch). He was a member of Uganda People's Congress political party and chairman of the UPC Kenya Chapter. Ojara died at Nairobi Hospital, a private medical facility in Nairobi, after a series of organ failures ending in cardiac arrest. He was 43 years old.

== See also ==
- Makerere University College of Health Sciences
- List of medical schools in Uganda
- List of hospitals in Uganda
