= Nicholas Opiyo =

Ugandan human rights lawyer

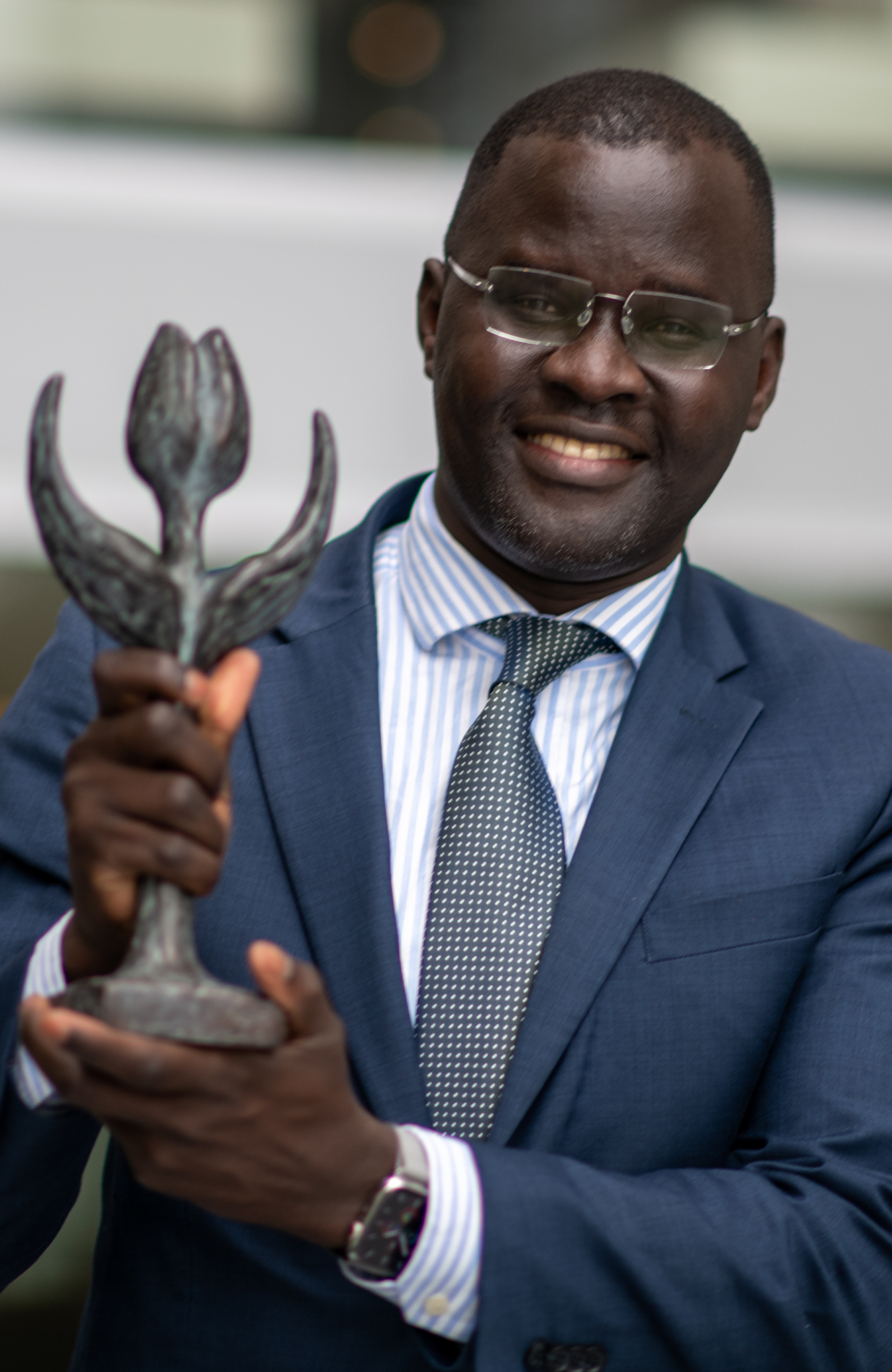
- Nicholas Opiyo in 2021
- Born: November 15, 1980 (age 45); Gulu, Uganda
- Education: Uganda Christian University (LLB); Law Development Centre, Kampala (Postgraduate Diploma in Legal Practice)
- Occupation: Human rights lawyer
- Known for: Executive Director of Chapter Four Uganda; Advocacy for civil rights and political freedoms
- Notable work: Founding Chapter Four Uganda
- Successor: Anthony Masake
- Awards: German Africa Prize (2017); Voices for Justice Award, Human Rights Watch (2015); Alison Des Forges Award for Extraordinary Activism (2015); Sakharov Fellows Prize, European Union Parliament (2016); Human Rights Tulip Prize (2021)
- Website: https://chapterfouruganda.com

Nicholas Opiyo (born November 15, 1980) is a Ugandan human rights lawyer and campaigner for civil rights and political freedoms. He is the executive director of Chapter Four Uganda.

== Background and education ==
Opiyo grew up in Gulu northern Uganda at the height of the conflict between the government of Uganda and the Lord's resistance army of Joseph Kony. Many of his friends and family members including his sister were abducted by the rebels to serve as slaves, soldiers and labourers. His sister spent eight years in the hands of the rebels before she escaped.

Opiyo once confessed he feared sleeping home and slept on streets because they seemed safer. All these experiences shaped his passion for defending human rights.

He studied his bachelor's of law (LLB) from Uganda Christian University in 2004 and a post graduate diploma in legal practice from Law Development Center Kampala in 2005.

== Career ==
Opiyo focuses his work on political and civil rights especially; electoral law, restrictions of freedom of assembly, clampdown on freedom of speech and freedom of press.

He is also known for representing and availing legal aid to LGBT people in Uganda.

In 2013, Opiyo founded Chapter four Uganda to offer legal aid and advance civil rights in Uganda.

Opiyo was a member of the team of experts to the United Nations special rapporteur on the rights to peaceful assembly and Association until 2017.

He is also the board chairman of action aid Uganda, a member of the human rights advisory board benetech, a silicon valley human rights and tech company based in palo Alto in California and African middle eastern leadership project (AMEL), a Washington DC–based think and action group.

In December 2020 Opiyo was arrested along with several other lawyers working for Bobi Wine, who was then running against Yoweri Museveni in the Ugandan presidential elections. He was denied bail, access to lawyers, and charged with money laundering. His arrest was termed "troubling" by Natalie E. Brown, then American diplomat to Uganda. He was granted bail on the 30th of December. In September, 2021, the Ugandan government dropped the charges after failing to present enough evidence before a court-appointed deadline.

== Awards ==
In 2017, Opiyo received the German Africa prize and in 2015 had received the Voices for justice award from Human Rights Watch. Also in 2015, he was a recipient of the Alison Des forges Award for extraordinary activism. He also received the European Union parliament Sakharou fellows prize in 2016.

Opiyo won the 2021 Human rights Tulip prize that was started by the Dutch government in 2008 to support human rights defenders to boost visibility of their work and inspire other activists.
