= Lubwa p'Chong =

Ugandan poet (1946–1997)

- Born: Cliff Lubwa p'Chong; 20 August 1946; Gulu, Uganda
- Died: February 1997; Kampala
- Occupation: writer
- Writing career
- Genre: Plays
- Notable works: The minister's wife, Generosity kills, The last safari

Lubwa p'Chong (20 August 1946 – February 1997) was a Ugandan playwright and poet. He founded and edited Nanga, the magazine of the National Teachers College, Kampala, and edited Dhana, the Makerere University literary magazine. His poetry has appeared in East African magazines and anthologies.

== Early life and education ==
Cliff Lubwa P’chong was born in Gulu, Uganda. He was educated at Koc Goma Primary School, then Gulu High School for his junior secondary school before joining Sir Samuel Baker School, Gulu, for his O'levels, then National Teachers' College Kyambogo where he qualified as a grade five teacher in 1969, before being posted to St Charles Lwanga SSS, Koboko. In 1976 he attained a bachelor's degree in literature and linguistics from the prestigious Makerere University, before proceeding to Durham and Exeter universities. He was a creative writing fellow at the University of Iowa (1987), and lectured in drama-in-education at the Institute of Teacher Education, Kyambogo. He had his early education there and in Kyambogo. He taught for several years, and then studied literature and linguistics at Makerere University.

== Writing ==
His plays Generosity Kills and The Last Safari (1975) were followed by Words of My Groaning (1976), a portrait of life in independent Africa. His other plays are The Minister’s Wife (1982), The Bishop’s Daughters (1988), Do Not Uproot the Ppumpkin (1987), Kinsmen and Kinswomen (1988) and The Madman (1989). Lubwa has also published the article "Okot p’Bitek: The cultural matrix of the acholi", in Uganda: The Cultural Landscape, edited by Eckhard Breitinger (1999).

== Published works ==
=== Plays ===
- The Mad Man. 1988.
- Kinsmen and Kinswomen. Crane Publishers. 1988.
- The Bishop's Daughters. 1988.
- Do Not Uproot the Pumpkin. 1987.
- The Minister's Wife. New Expression Press. 1983.
- Words of My Groaning. East African Literature Bureau. 1976.
- Generosity Kills and The Last Safari: two plays. Longman. 1975.
- The Last Safari. 1975.

=== Literary criticism ===
- "Okot p'Bitek: The cultural matrix of the Acholi in his writings", in Eckhard Breitinger, ed. (1999). Uganda: the cultural landscape. Fountain Publishers. ISBN 9783927510302.
- A biographical sketch in Artist, the Ruler: Essays on Art, Culture and Values. East African Publishers. 1986.
