= Lamwo District =

- District
- District location in Uganda
- Coordinates: 03°32′N 32°48′E
- Country: Uganda
- Region: Northern Region of Uganda
- Sub-region: Acholi sub-region
- Capital: Lamwo

Area
  - Total: 5,595.8 km^{2} (2,160.6 sq mi)
- Elevation: 1,100 m (3,600 ft)

Population (2012 Estimate)
  - Total: 171,300
  - Density: 30.6/km^{2} (79/sq mi)
- Time zone: UTC+3 (EAT)
- Website: www.lamwo.go.ug

Lamwo District is a district in the Northern Region of Uganda. The town of Lamwo is the site of the district headquarters.

== Location ==
Lamwo District is bordered by South Sudan to the north, Kitgum District to the east and southeast, Pader District to the south, Gulu District to the southwest, and Amuru District to the west. The town of Lamwo is lies 66 kilometres (41 mi) northwest of Kitgum, the nearest large town, and 150 kilometres (93 mi) northeast of Gulu, the largest city in the Acholi sub-region.

== Overview ==
Lamwo District was established by Act of Parliament, becoming functional on 1 July 2009. Before that, it was part of the Kitgum District. Lamwo District is part of the larger Acholi sub-region.

== Population ==
In 1991, the Uganda national population census estimated the district population at 71,030. The 2002 national census estimated the population at 115,300. The population grew at a calculated annual rate of 4.1 percent between 2002 and 2012. In 2012, the population was estimated at 171,300.

== See also ==
- Acholi people
- Districts of Uganda
