= Acholi people =

Ethnic group of South Sudan and Northern Uganda

Acholi

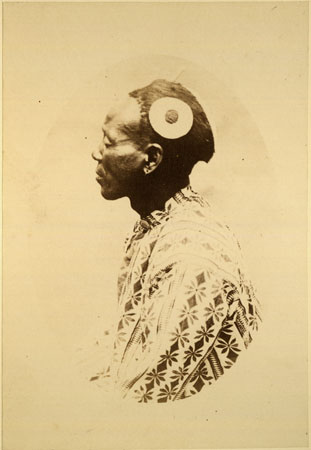
- The Acholi are an ethnic group that belongs to the Nilotic ethnic group of Luo peoples, who are said to have come to northern Uganda from the area now known as Bahr el Ghazal (Sea of Gazelles) in South Sudan.

Total population
- 2,460,000

Regions with significant populations
- Uganda: 2,400,000
- South Sudan: 134,000

Languages
- Acholi, English

Religion
- Christianity (99%), Islam (1%)

Related ethnic groups
- Other Nilotic peoples Especially other Luo peoples

The Acholi people (/əˈtʃoʊ.li/ ə-CHOH-li, also spelled Acoli) are a Nilotic ethnic group of Luo peoples (also spelled Lwo), found in Magwi County in South Sudan and Northern Uganda (an area commonly referred to as Acholiland), including the districts of Agago, Amuru, Gulu, Kitgum, Nwoya, Lamwo, Pader and Omoro District. The Acholi living in Uganda were estimated to number 1.9 million people in 2024 and over 45,000 more were living in South Sudan in 2000.

== Language ==
Opoka speaking Acholi.

The Acholi dialect is a Western Nilotic language, classified as Luo (or Lwo). It has similarity with Alur, Padhola language, and other Luo languages in South Sudan Shilluk, Anuak, Pari, Balanda, Boor, Thuri. Then in Kenya and Tanzania are the Joluo also known as the Luo.

The Song of Lawino, one of the most successful African literary works, was written by Okot p'Bitek, published in 1966 in Acholi, and later translated to English.

== Location ==
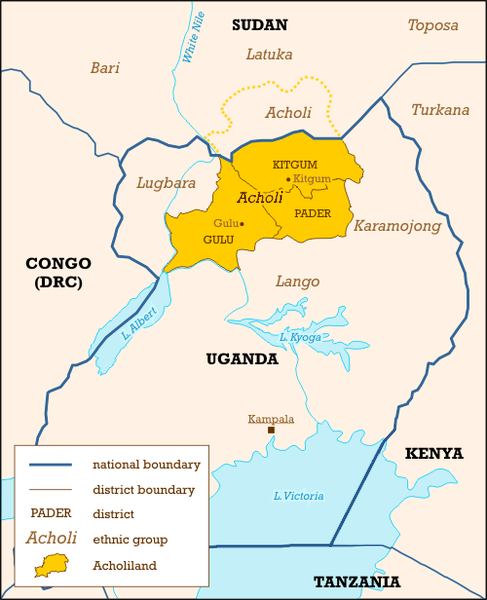
Acholiland, Uganda

Acholi land or "Acoli-land" (also known as the Acholi sub-region) refers to the region traditionally inhabited by the Acholi. In the administrative structure of Uganda, Acholi is composed of the districts of:

1. Agago
2. Amuru
3. Gulu
4. Kitgum
5. Lamwo
6. Nwoya
7. Pader
8. Omoro

It encompasses about 28,500 km^{2} (11,000 square miles) near the Uganda-Sudan border.

Its current population is estimated to be around 2,155,000 individuals, or six percent of the total national population. While Acholi also live north of the South Sudanese borders, the Sudanese Acholi are often excluded from the political meaning of the term "Acholiland".

The word 'Acholi' is a misnomer that became adopted for convenience over the years. It refers to people known locally as Lwo or Luo Gang. That is why the Lango neighbors refer to the Acholi as Ugangi, meaning people of the home.

== History ==
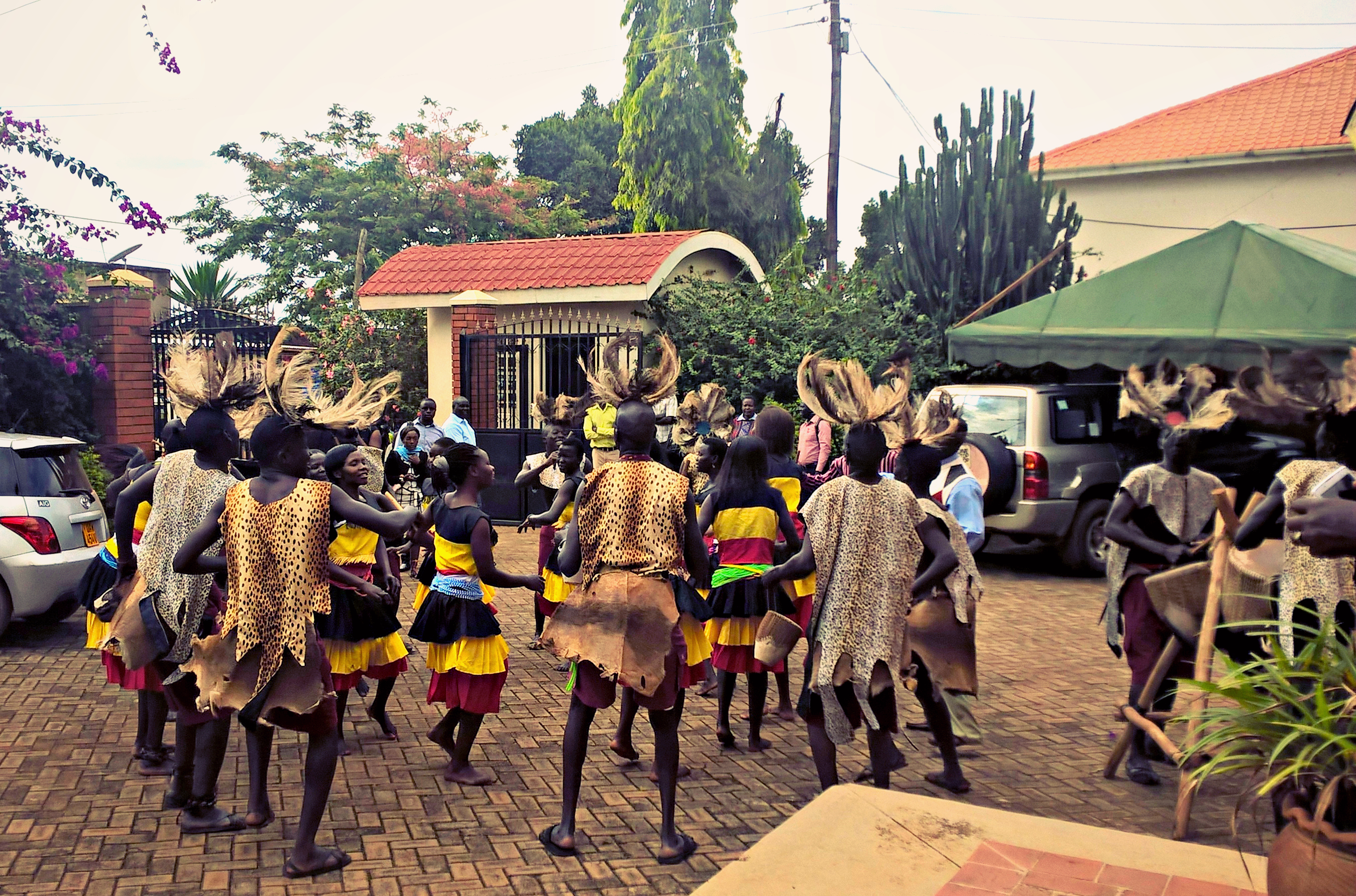
Acholi Bwala Dance, Uganda

The presumed nominal forebears of the present-day Acholi group migrated South to Northern Uganda from the area now known as Bahr el Ghazal in South Sudan by about 1,000 AD. Starting in the late seventeenth century, a new sociopolitical order developed among the Luo of Northern Uganda, mainly characterized by the formation of chiefdoms headed by Rwodi (sg. Rwot, 'ruler'). The chiefs traditionally came from one clan, and each chiefdom had several villages made up of different patrilineal clans. By the mid-nineteenth century, about 60 small chiefdoms existed in eastern Acholi-land. During the second half of the nineteenth century, Arabic-speaking traders from the north started to call them Shooli, a term which was transformed into 'Acholi'.

Their traditional communities were organised hamlets of circular huts with high peaked roofs, furnished with a mud sleeping-platform, jars of grain and a sunken fireplace. Women daubed the walls with mud, decorating them with geometrical or conventional designs in red, white or grey. The men were skilled hunters, using nets and spears. They also kept goats, sheep and cattle. The women were accomplished agriculturists, growing and processing a variety of food crops, including millet, simsim, groundnuts, peas, sorghum and vegetables. In war, the men used spears and long, narrow shields of giraffe or ox hide.

During Uganda's colonial period, the British encouraged political and economic development in the south of the country, in particular among the Baganda. In contrast, the Acholi and other northern ethnic groups supplied much of the national manual labor and came to comprise a majority of the military, creating what some have called a "military ethnocracy".

Many of the Acholi soldiers who joined the Kings African Rifles (KAR), the British colonial army, were deployed to the frontlines in southeast Asia especially in Singapore and Burma during the World War II where they held British positions against an intense Japanese offensive. Notable among the Acholi soldiers who made the ranks were Gen. Tito Okello-Lutwa, Brig. Pyerino Okoya and Lt. Gen Bazilio Olara-Okello.

Due to the changing economy, after the 1950s, fewer of Acholi were recruited to the armed forces but continued to be associated with them in popular mythology and stereotypes.

In the 2000s, James Ojent Latigo described some of Uganda's social problems as based on the way the political elites have used ethnicities to divided the country. He has noted that the emphasis on the distinction among ethnic groups has even been part of the internal government dialogue." He wrote, "Part of the structural causes of the conflict in Uganda has been explained as rooted in the 'diversity of ethnic groups which were at different levels of socio-economic development and political organization.' (Ugandan Parliamentary Committee on Defense and Internal Affairs 1997.)

He has written further,

"Since independence in 1962, Uganda has been plagued by ethnically driven, politically manipulated violence referred to by some as a history of 'cycles of revenge and mistrust'. Deep-rooted divisions and polarization remain between different ethnic groups, and these have been greatly exacerbated by the way in which the country's leadership has developed since independence."

Milton Obote, the first leader after independence, relied on Acholi Luo people and Langi Nilo Hamites or Ateker peoples in government. Idi Amin who was also from Northern Uganda, although one of the Kakwa people, overthrew Obote's government and established a dictatorship, ultimately suppressing and killing 300,000 people, including many Acholi. General Tito Okello was an Acholi who came to power in a military coup but was defeated in January 1986. Despite the years of leadership by men from the North, that region continued to be marginalized economically after independence, and has suffered higher rates of poverty than other areas of the country.

After defeating Okello and his Acholi-dominated Uganda National Liberation Army, now-President Yoweri Museveni and his National Resistance Army conducted revenge killings in the North. Museveni has held absolute power since 1986, surviving unrest, civil war, and numerous attempts at coups.

The Acholi are known to the outside world mainly because of the long insurgency of the Lord's Resistance Army (LRA) led by Joseph Kony, an Acholi from Gulu. The activities of the LRA have been devastating within Acholi-land (though they spread also to neighboring districts and countries). In September 1996, the Ugandan government moved hundreds of thousands of Acholi from the Gulu district into camps, ostensibly for their protection. Since 1996 this policy has expanded to encompass the entire rural Acholi population of four districts, one million people. These camps had some of the highest mortality rates in the world, with an estimated 1,000 people dying per week at one point with Malaria and AIDS being the primary disease causes of deaths. The refugees in the camps were also subject to raids by both LRA and government forces.

At the height of the insurgency, 1.8 million people in the north were living in camps. Peace talks beginning in 2005 promised some relief to these people, and some camps were closed in 2007 as security in the north improved. As of September 2009, large numbers of Acholi people remained in camps as internally displaced persons. The long civil war in the North destroyed much of their society.

The majority of elected members of parliament in the Acholi sub-region are members of the opposition.

== Religion ==
According to the 2002 Census of Uganda an estimated 72.3% of Acholi are Roman Catholic, 23.6% are Anglican, 1.7% are Pentecostal and 0.8% are Muslim.

According to Latigo, prior to colonialism, "the Acholi people maintained a traditional government that was rooted firmly in their religious beliefs, norms, and customs, which demanded peace and stability in Acholi-land at all times, based on their philosophy of life. This structure was maintained by the real anointed chiefs of the Acholi, the rwodi moo." Although they were believed to have supernatural powers, the chiefs ruled through a Council of Clan Elders, so they never ruled singlehandedly. The council's representatives could mediate issues between clans, and essentially covered both civil and criminal functions, like a Supreme Court. It was a system of governance fully integrated with their religion and cosmology.

It was not until 1995 that a constitutional reform recognized such cultural leaders, but they have not been fully restored to previous powers, as so much of society has changed. In the pre-colonial era, all the Acholi believed in the same superior being, YA Latwer. Killing of a person was prohibited but if it took place, negotiations for blood money were led by the victim's family, with agreement followed by rituals of a reconciliation ceremony to restore the killer to the community, and to bring peace between clans. In addition, the people have important rituals for cleansing homes and sites, to welcome back people who have been away a long time, to clear spirits from places where killings have occurred, and to welcome people who have been captive.

The system values peace over justice, and has retributive and restorative aspects. Most of the LRA returnees, numbering 12,000, underwent nyono tong gweno ('stepping on the egg') after returning to their home villages, to help restore them home. It is important because it is intended to restore communities to balance, and to bring people back into relation in their home communities, where ideally they would return at the end of the war. Purifications or atonement practices are still performed by Acholi elders in some communities.

=== Acholi Religious Leaders' Peace Initiative ===
The religious leaders have tried to help end the conflict in the country of the last two decades and to reconcile the parties. "In 1997, the Catholic, Anglican, Muslim, and later the Orthodox religious leaders of Acholi formalized their increasing cooperation on peace issues by setting up the Acholi Religious Leaders' Peace Initiative (ARLPI)." They have continued to work to end the war through negotiation. Kitgum, Pader and Gulu, the three districts of the Acholi sub-region, each established peace forums for continuing discussions. In addition, the peace forums have worked to help establish the Amnesty Commission. They have also "played a vital role in Acholi traditional reconciliation processes and in preparing the community to receive former combatants." In discussing the peace talks of 2005–2007, Latigo noted leaders who called for a revival of the traditional processes of the indigenous people by which they worked for accountability and justice, namely, mato oput. Ruhakana Rugunda, the Ugandan minister of internal affairs and leader of the government negotiating team, noted the effectiveness of the traditional system. He and others have suggested it could help the nation more than adopting the Western system of the International Criminal Court at The Hague (although some charges had already been filed against LRA leaders in 2005 there).

Acholi people photographed by Richard Buchta (1877-1880)

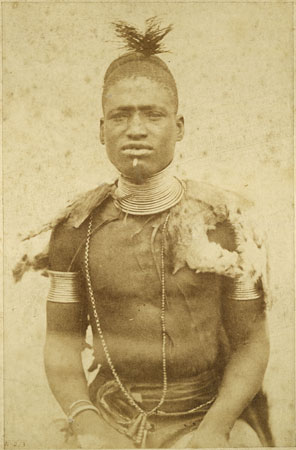
Acholi man

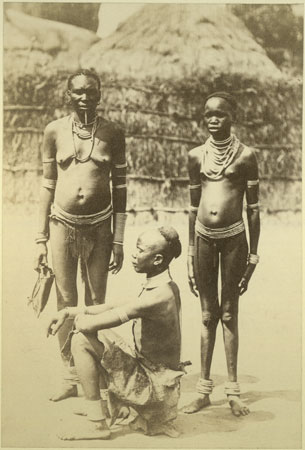
Acholi family

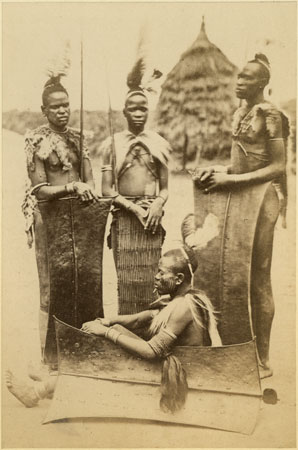
Acholi warriors

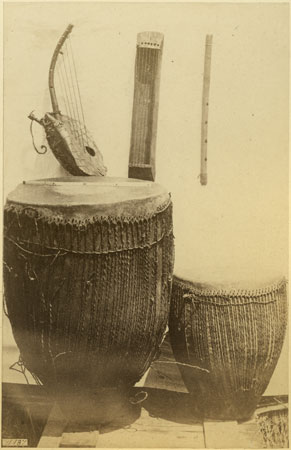
Acholi musical instruments

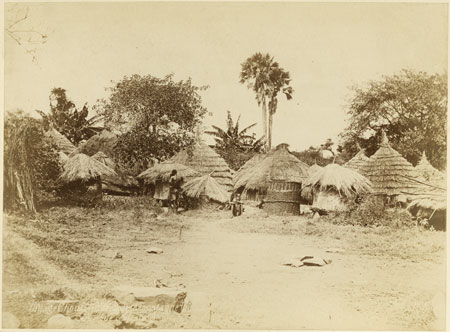
Acholi village

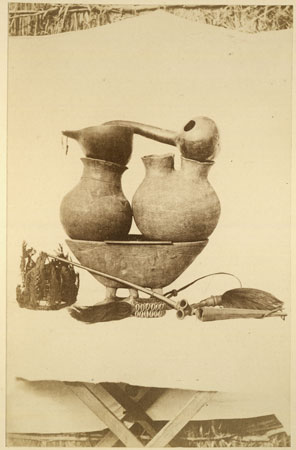
Acholi "material culture"

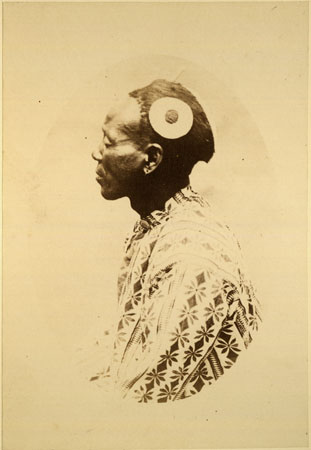
Acholi chief

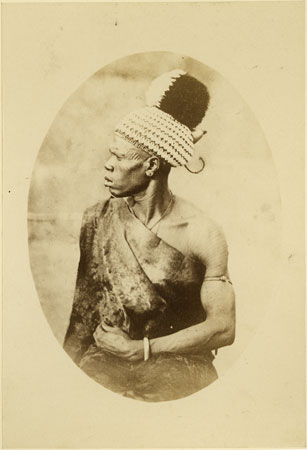
Acholi chief

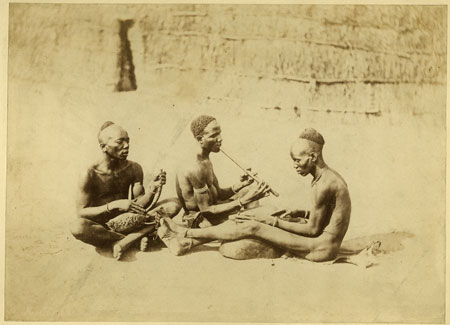
Acholi musicians

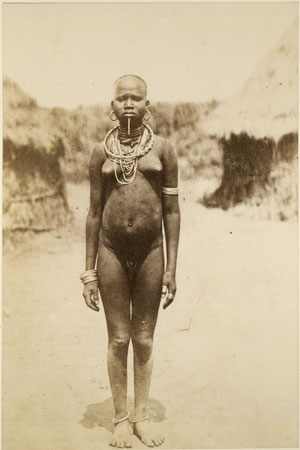
Portrait of an Acholi woman

Lamogi Rebellion

Acholi Civil war (1986–1989)

In January 1986, the junta government of Gen. Tito Okello-Lutwa in Uganda was overthrown by Museveni and his NRA rebels. Tito and Bazilio, who were Acholi by tribe, fled the country into exile. Soon after, the NRM started pacifying the northern region, which is home to several ethnics, including the Acholi and Alur.

The attempt to pacify the Northern Uganda was carried out recklessly with much brutality and unprofessionalism from the NRA soldiers and government. This resulted in resistance building up in the region and soon a host of rebel groups sprang up in the north. Most prominent among them was the Uganda People's Army (UPA) in Teso and Lango sub region, the West Nile Bank Frontiers (WNBF) in the West Nile region, the Uganda People's Democratic Army, the Holy Spirit Movement and the LRA in the Acholi region. These rebellions sprung up in defiance and from disapproval of the conduct and legitimacy of the new NRA government.

Some of the groups in Acholi, like the UPDA, detested the Museveni regime because it had overthrown the government in which they served. They were also against the power consolidation approach of the NRA, which included mass arrest, torturing, killing, cattle raiding, food crop destruction, and looting and burning of villages.

The NRA managed to defeat all the rebel groups except the LRA which culminated in a 20-year conflict. At the peak of the conflict, 90% of the Acholi population moved into IDP camps designed as protected villages. The camps caused misery and suffering—with a conservative death toll of 1,000 people a week. Conservative approaches estimates that at least 300,000 people died in the conflict that extended into the Sudan, Congo and Central African Republic.

== In popular culture ==
In 2012 the American charity Invisible Children produced a documentary about the LRA. The documentary was met with mixed reactions, with many people familiar with the situation dubbing it a shallow and money-grabbing scheme. However, it successfully popularized the LRA in the West.

In 2016, the multi award-winning film, A Brilliant Genocide was produced. It was filmed by Australian director Ebony Butler, Simon Hardwidge and Ugandan author Frey Onen. The documentary focused on the unofficial discourse of the LRA war and it was largely critical of the Ugandan government role in the LRA war.

The Acholi people have numerous trenchant proverbs and proverbs. E.g., "Ange tyene lit, koko ange" (Regret has sore legs, that’s why it arrives late), and "Lit wic" (Pain of the head, meaning stubbornness).

== Notable Acholi people ==
- Akena p'Ojok, former UNLF Vice President, former UPC member of Parliament and Minister of Power in Obote's second regime.
- Nicholas Opiyo, Ugandan human rights lawyer. Executive Director and Lead Attorney at Chapter Four Uganda. Won the German Africa Prize in 2017, Voices for Justice Award from Human Rights Watch in 2015 and the European Union Parliament Sakharov Fellows Prize in 2016. Was also the 2015 recipient of the Alison Des Forges award for extraordinary activism.
- Sheila Atim, Ugandan-British actress, singer, composer, and playwright. She made her professional acting debut in 2013 at Shakespeare's Globe in The Lightning Child.
- David Otti, a former Ugandan footballer and coach who was part of the famous 1978 team.
- Judith Ayaa a former track and field athlete who competed in the 400 and 800 metres.
- Aamito Stacie Lagum, US-based Ugandan actress and fashion model, best known for being the winner of the first cycle of Africa's Next Top Model.
- Daudi Ochieng, Ugandan Nationalist and Politician, who served as Secretary General of the Kabaka Yekka (KY) party and Opposition Chief Whip (from 1965 to 1966).
- Bazilio Olara-Okello, de facto Ugandan Head of State for six months in 1985 and later Chief of Defense Forces.
- Patricia Akello, Ugandan professional model, currently signed with the Muse Model Management company in New York City. She walked the 2017 New York Fashion Week, in September, working for the Bottega Veneta brand and was featured in the cover of Women's Wear Daily magazine.
- Beatrice Akello Akori, Ugandan politician. Woman member of parliament for Agago District. Minister of State for Economic Monitoring in the Office of the President.
- Richard Todwong, former member of parliament. Current secretary general of the ruling National Resistance Movement (NRM) Party.
- Otema Allimadi, Ugandan politician who served as the country's foreign minister (1979–1980) in the UNLF government and later on as the country's third prime minister of Uganda (1980–1985) in the UPC government.
- Betty Oyella Bigombe, former MP and State Minister for Water Resources in the Ugandan Cabinet. Served as World Bank's senior director for fragility, conflict and violence at Washington DC from 2014 – 2017.
- Emmanuel Amey Ojara, surgeon.
- Dominic Ongwen, former commander of the Sinia Brigade of the LRA, currently awaiting the verdict of his trial at the International Criminal Court.
- Erinayo Wilson Oryema, First Ugandan Inspector General of Uganda Police Force (1964–1971), Minister of Land, Minerals and Water Resources (1971–1973), Minister of Housing and Planning (1974–1977).
- Geoffrey Oryema, exiled singer and son of Erinayo Wilson Oryema.
- Janani Luwum, former Archbishop of the Anglican Church of Uganda, murdered on the orders of President Idi Amin.
- Jeremiah Lucas Opira, National Executive Secretary of the UNLF, advocate for consolidation of national unity in Uganda.
- Joseph Kony, leader of the Lord's Resistance Army (LRA), a guerrilla group that formerly operated in Uganda.
- Lubwa p'Chong, playwright, poet, author and educator.
- Matthew Lukwiya, physician at the forefront of the 2000 Ebola outbreak, which took his life.
- Norbert Mao, former chairman of Gulu District and Democratic Party presidential candidate in 2011, 2016 and 2021. Current minister for justice and constitutional affairs.
- Okot p'Bitek, poet, playwright and author of the Song of Lawino.
- Tito Okello, President of Uganda for six months in 1985 (though he referred to himself only as 'Head of State').
- Henry Oryem Okello, current state minister for foreign affairs (international affairs), since 2004. Son of Tito Okello.
- Jacob Oulanyah, former Speaker of Ugandan Parliament May 2021 – March 2022, former deputy of parliament from 2011 – May 2021. He was also the member of Parliament for Omoro County before his untimely death on 19 March 2022.
- John Baptist Odama, Catholic archbishop of Gulu, with long periods as chair of the Acholi Religious Leaders Peace Initiative.
- MacLeod Baker Ochola, Anglican bishop in Uganda. He was the inaugural bishop of Kitgum, serving from 1995 until 2002.
- Harriet Anena, Ugandan writer and performer, whose writing includes poetry, nonfiction and fiction. She is the author of a collection of poems, A Nation In Labor, published in 2015. She won the 2018 Wole Soyinka Prize for Literature in Africa. The Economist described her poetry performance as "an arresting evocation of love and war".
