= Kitgum District =

- District
- District location in Uganda
- Coordinates: 03°13′N 32°47′E
- Country: Uganda
- Region: Northern Uganda
- Sub-region: Acholi sub-region
- Capital: Kitgum

Area
  - Total: 3,960 km^{2} (1,530 sq mi)

Population (2014 Census)
  - Total: 204,012
  - Density: 51.5/km^{2} (133/sq mi)
- Time zone: UTC+3 (EAT)
- Website: www.kitgum.go.ug

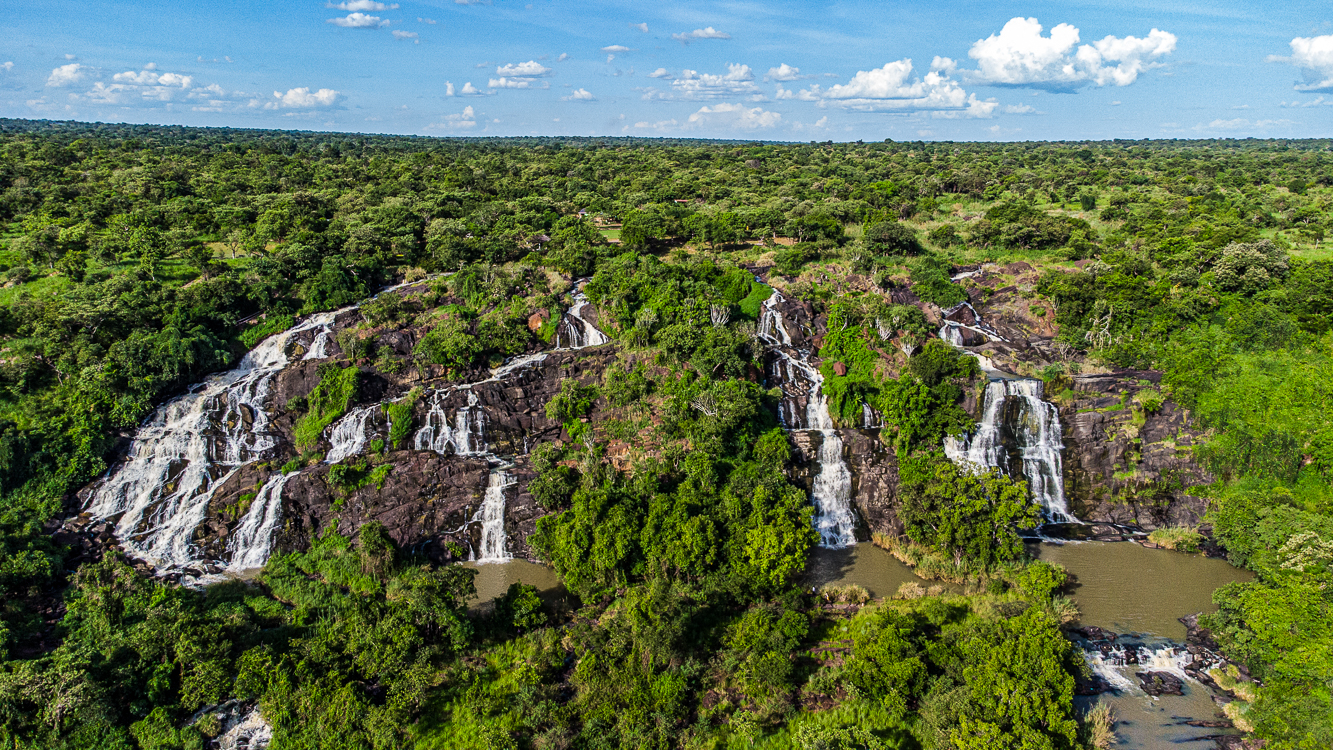
Aruu falls located along Gulu Kitgum highway, in Pader district, northern Uganda.

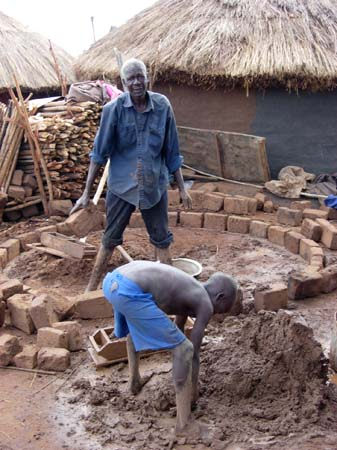
Building hut in Kitgum IDP camp, Uganda.

Kitgum District is a district in Northern Uganda. It is named after its major town of Kitgum, where the district headquarters is located. The district is part of the Acholi sub-region.

== Location ==
Kitgum District is bordered by South Sudan to the north, Kaabong District to the east, Kotido District to the southeast, Agago District to the south, Pader District to the southwest and Lamwo District to the northwest. Kitgum, the largest town in the district, lies 108 kilometres (67 mi) northeast of Gulu, the largest city in the sub-region. It lies approximately 460 kilometres (290 mi) north of Uganda's capital, Kampala.

== Overview ==
The district is composed of one county: Chua County. In 2010, Lamwo County was separated from Kitgum District to form Lamwo District. Kitgum District is a constituent part of Acholiland, home to an estimated 1.1 million Acholi, according to the 2002 national census.

== Population ==
In 1991, the Ugandan national population census estimated the district population at about 104,600. According to the national census of 2002, Kitgum District had a population of about 167,000, of whom 51.3% were females and 48.7% were males. The annual population growth rate of the district, between 2002 and 2012, was calculated at 4.1%. It is estimated that the population of the district in 2012, was approximately 247,800.

== Economic activities ==
Agriculture is the main economic activity in the district. Crops grown include the following:

- Millet
- Sorghum
- Beans
- Cassava
- Potatoes
- Peas
- Simsim
- Sunflower
- Cotton
- Tobacco
- Cabbage
- Tomatoes
- Sugarcane
- Groundnuts
- Cattle ranching

== Graphite ==
The Orom-Cross Graphite Project is located approximately 6 km east (in a straight line) of the town of Orom and 75 km northeast of the town of Kitgum in northern Uganda. The nearest large settlement to the Project is the village of Orom, located in Chua East Country.

At a radius of 323 square kilometers, the Orom-Cross graphite project covers 10 villages in Orom East Sub County in Kitgum District.

== Hepatitis epidemic ==
During late 2007 and early 2008, as many of the residents of the Internally Displaced Persons (IDP) camps started to return to their home areas following peace talks, an outbreak of Hepatitis E engulfed the community, and soon spread to the entire district. As of August 2008, a total of 8,157 cases had been identified; 62% were female, while 38% were male. The case fatality ratio was 1.52%. Seventy two percent (72%) of the fatalities were female. The epidemic has been traced to unsanitary sources of drinking water. By July 2009, the number of infected persons had increased to 10,243, of whom 162 died; a case fatality ratio of 1.58%.

== Notable people ==
- Matthew Lukwiya, physician
- Janani Luwum, martyr. Anglican Archbishop of Uganda killed in 1977 during the conflict; born and buried in Mucwini village.
- Sunday Omony, plus-size model born in Kitgum District.
- Henry Oryem Okello, politician and lawyer

== Sports ==
- Acholi Queens FC

== See also ==
- Kitgum
- Acholi sub-region
- Acholi people
- Lord's Resistance Army
- Districts of Uganda
- Agoro Community Development Association
