= Pader District =

- District
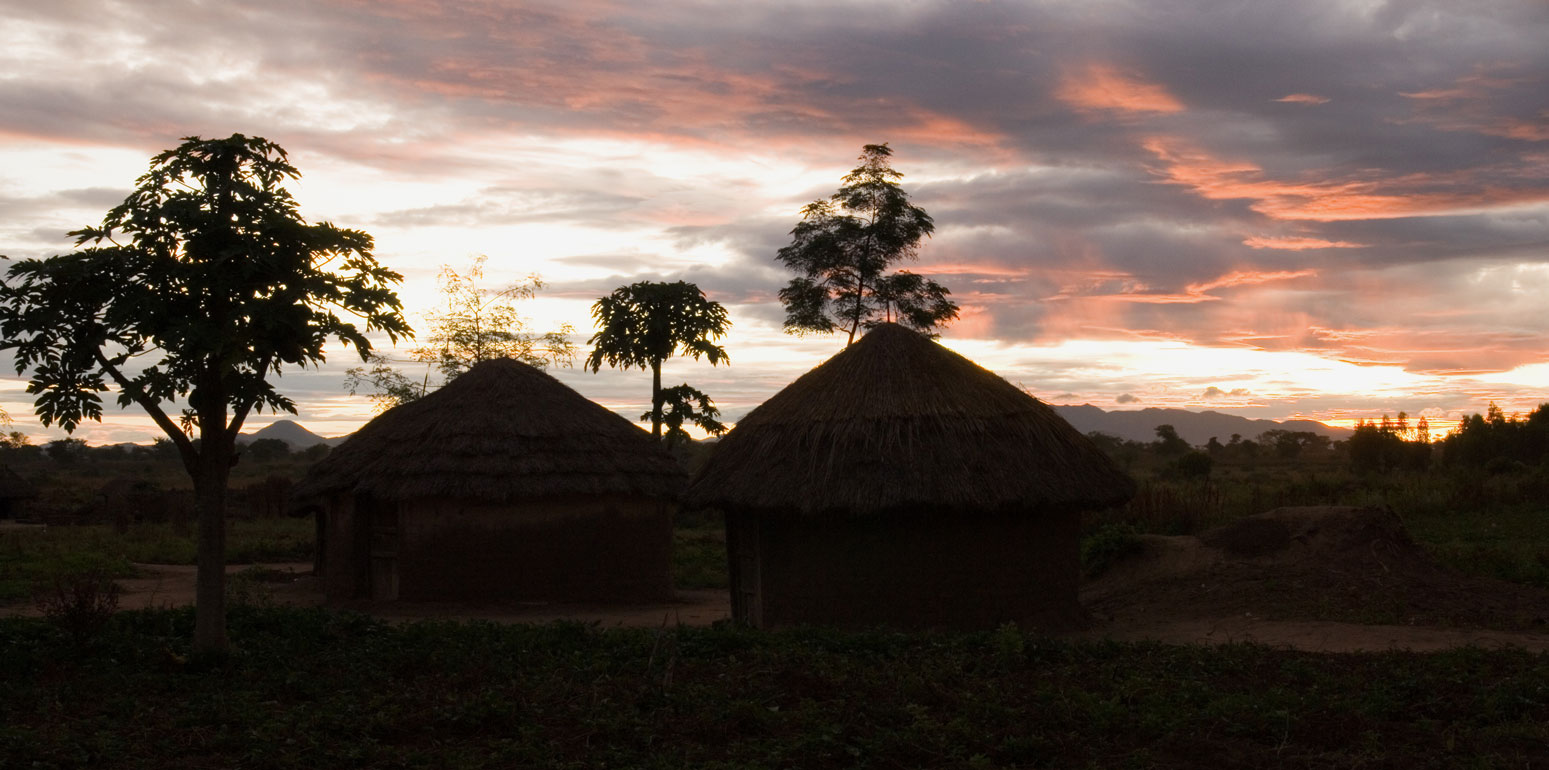
- Sunrise in Patongo internally displaced persons camp (now Agago District).

- District location in Uganda
- Coordinates: 02°50′N 33°05′E
- Country: Uganda
- Region: Northern Uganda
- Sub-region: Acholi sub-region
- Capital: Pader

Area
  - Total: 3,362.5 km^{2} (1,298.3 sq mi)

Population (2012 Estimate)
  - Total: 231,700
  - Density: 68.9/km^{2} (178/sq mi)
- Time zone: UTC+3 (EAT)
- Website: www.pader.go.ug

Pader District is a district in Northern Uganda. It is named after Pader, the chief municipal, administrative and commercial town in the district, where the district headquarters are located.

== Location ==
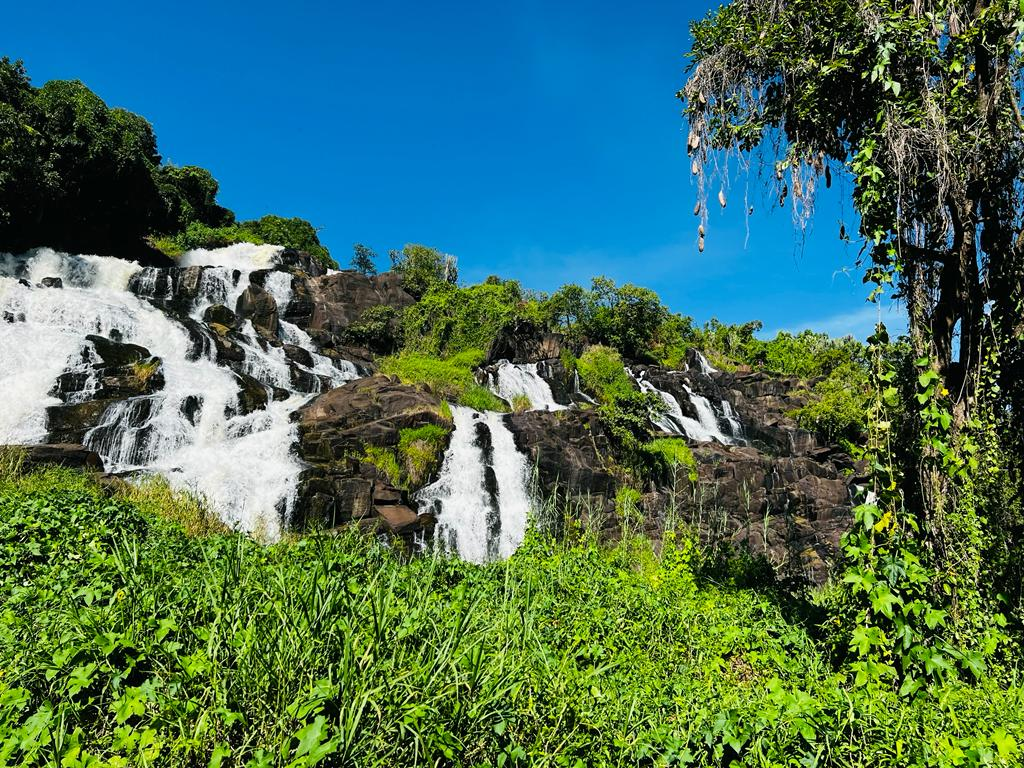
Aruu Falls in Pader District.

Pader District is bordered by Lamwo District to the northwest, Kitgum District to the northeast, Agago District to the east, Otuke District to the southeast, Lira District to the south, Oyam District to the southwest and Gulu District to the west. The district headquarters at Pader are located approximately 130 kilometres (81 mi), by road, northeast of Gulu, the largest city in the sub-region. The coordinates of the district are:02 50N, 33 05E.

== Overview ==
The district is relatively new, having been part of Kitgum District in the past. In December 2001, Aruu County and Agago County were carved out of Kitgum District to form Pader District. The seat of the district government, Pader, is located in the center of the district. The district, along with Amuru District, Agago District, Gulu District, Lamwo District, Nwoya District and Kitgum District, constitutes Acholi sub-region, considered to be the historical homeland of the Acholi ethnic group, and home to an estimated 1.1 million inhabitants in 2002, according to the national census conducted that year.

== Population ==
The 1991 census estimated the district population at about 80,900. The 2002 national census estimated the population of the district at about 142,300. For the greater part of the first decade of the 2000s, the majority of the population within the district have been living in camps for internally displaced people (IDP), as the result of the Lord's Resistance War. With the cessation of hostilities between the LRA and the UPDF in 2006, the majority of the people in the IDP camps have moved back to their homes. In 2012, the population of Pader District was estimated at 231,700.

== Economic activity ==
Agriculture is the backbone of the district economy. 90% of the district population engage in agriculture. The food crops grown include The following:

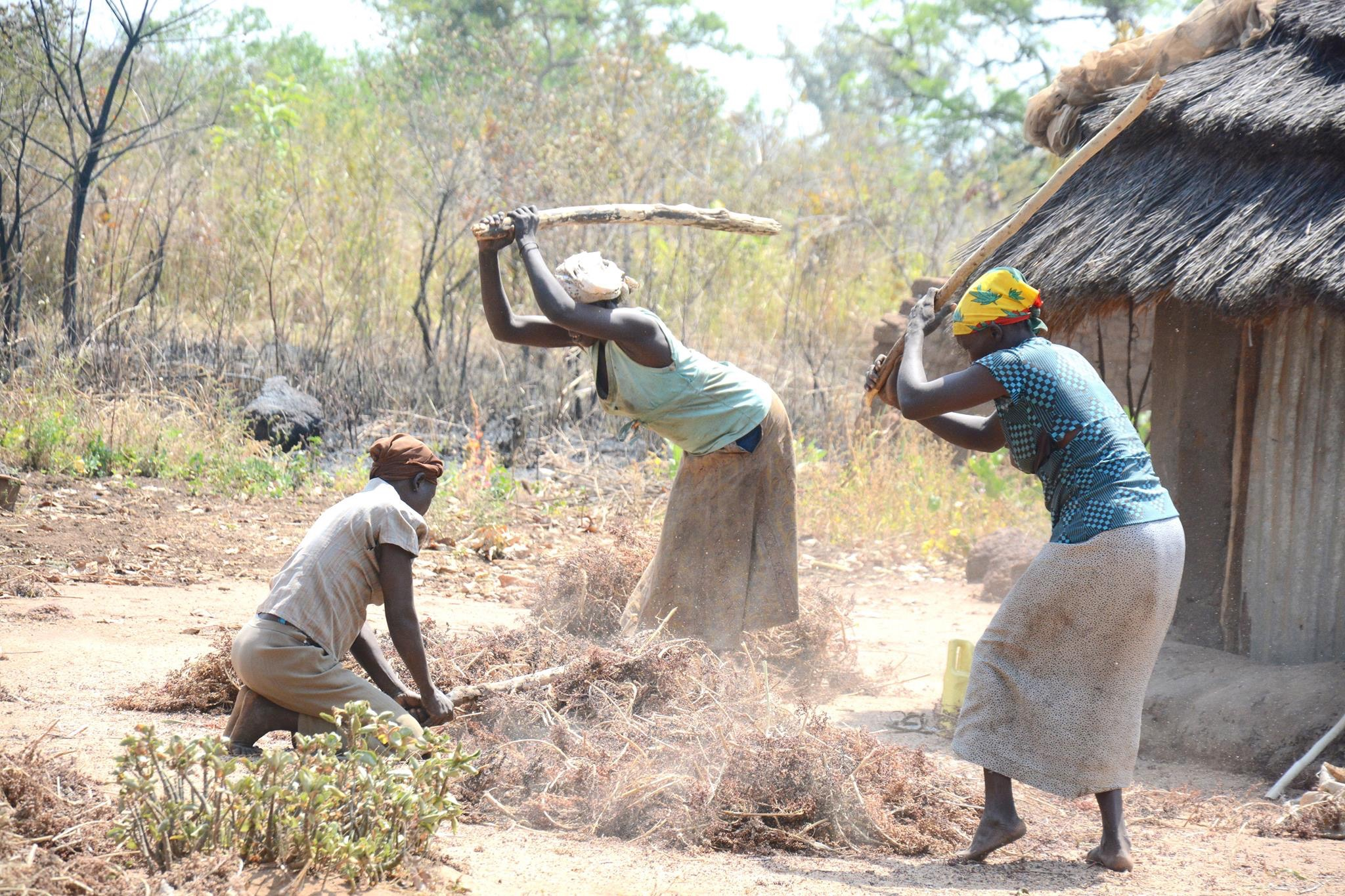
Women pounding sorghum.

- Beans
- Peas
- Cassava
- Millet
- Maize
- Sorghum
- Vegetables

Cash crops include: Cotton, Groundnuts, Sunflower, Rice, Tobacco, Soya beans and Simsim. Fish farming and fish hunting are also commonly practiced.

== Livestock kept by the population ==
- Goats
- Sheep
- Pig
- Cattle
- Donkey
- Chicken

== See also ==
- Pader
- Patongo
- Acholi
- The Acholi
- Northern Uganda
- Uganda Districts
- Parliament of Uganda
