= Kitgum, Uganda =

Kitgum
- Map of Uganda showing the location of Kitgum.
- Coordinates: 03°17′20″N 32°52′40″E
- Country: Uganda
- Region: Northern Region of Uganda
- Sub-region: Acholi sub-region
- District: Kitgum District
- Elevation: 760 m (2,490 ft)

Population (2024 Census)
  - Total: 50,166
- Time zone: UTC+3 (EAT)

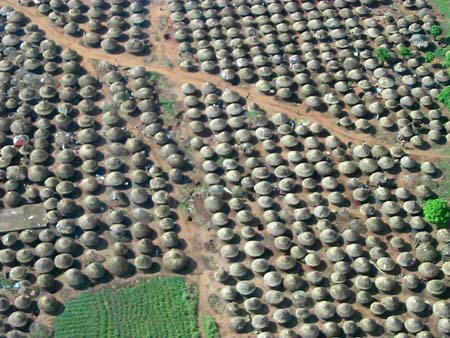
Kitgum IDP camp from the air, Uganda

Kitgum is a municipality in Kitgum District in the Northern Region of Uganda. The town is administered by Kitgum Municipality Council, an urban local government. It is the largest metropolitan area in the district and the site of the district headquarters.

== Location ==
Kitgum is bordered by Lamwo District to the north, Mucwini to the north-east, Kitgum Matidi to the east, Acholibur to the south, and Pajimu to the west. The town is located 104 kilometres (65 mi) north-east of Gulu, the largest city in the Acholi sub-region. This is approximately 435 kilometres (270 mi) north of Uganda's capital Kampala. The geographical coordinates of Kitgum are 3°17'20.0"N, 32°52'40.0"E (Latitude:3.288889; Longitude:32.877778).

== Population ==
The 2014 census put the population of Kitgum town at 44,604.

== Points of interest ==
The following additional points of interest are located within or near the town of Kitgum:

- Acaki Lodge, mid range lodge with 10 chalets built of local materials and thatching, 2 tents, a conference facility and gardensset out on an expansive 20 acre leafy plain on the banks of Alango Stream, Acaki Lodge was constructed on what was formerly a garbage dump. It is a conservation miracle as the land has now been turned into a green park.
- Kitgum Hospital, a 200-bed public hospital administered by the Uganda Ministry of Health
- St. Joseph's Hospital Kitgum, a 300-bed community hospital administered by the Roman Catholic Archdiocese of Gulu
- offices of Kitgum Town Council
- Kitgum central market
- Irene Gleeson Foundation Headquarters, the first school started by Irene Gleeson and serving over 3,000 students
- Rwekunye–Apac–Aduku–Lira–Kitgum–Musingo Road, the 350 kilometres (217 mi) mile road passing through the middle of town
- National Memory and Peace Documentation Centre

== See also ==
- Acholi people
- List of cities and towns in Uganda
- Okello Oryem
- Olara Otunnu
