= Agago District =

- District
- District location in Uganda
- Coordinates: 02°50′N 33°20′E
- Country: Uganda
- Region: Northern Uganda
- Sub-region: Acholi sub-region
- Established: 1 July 2010
- Capital: Agago

Area
  - Total: 3,496.8 km^{2} (1,350.1 sq mi)
- Elevation: 1,060 m (3,480 ft)

Population (2014 Census)
  - Total: 227,792
  - Density: 68.06/km^{2} (176.3/sq mi)
- Time zone: UTC+3 (EAT)
- Website: www.agago.go.ug

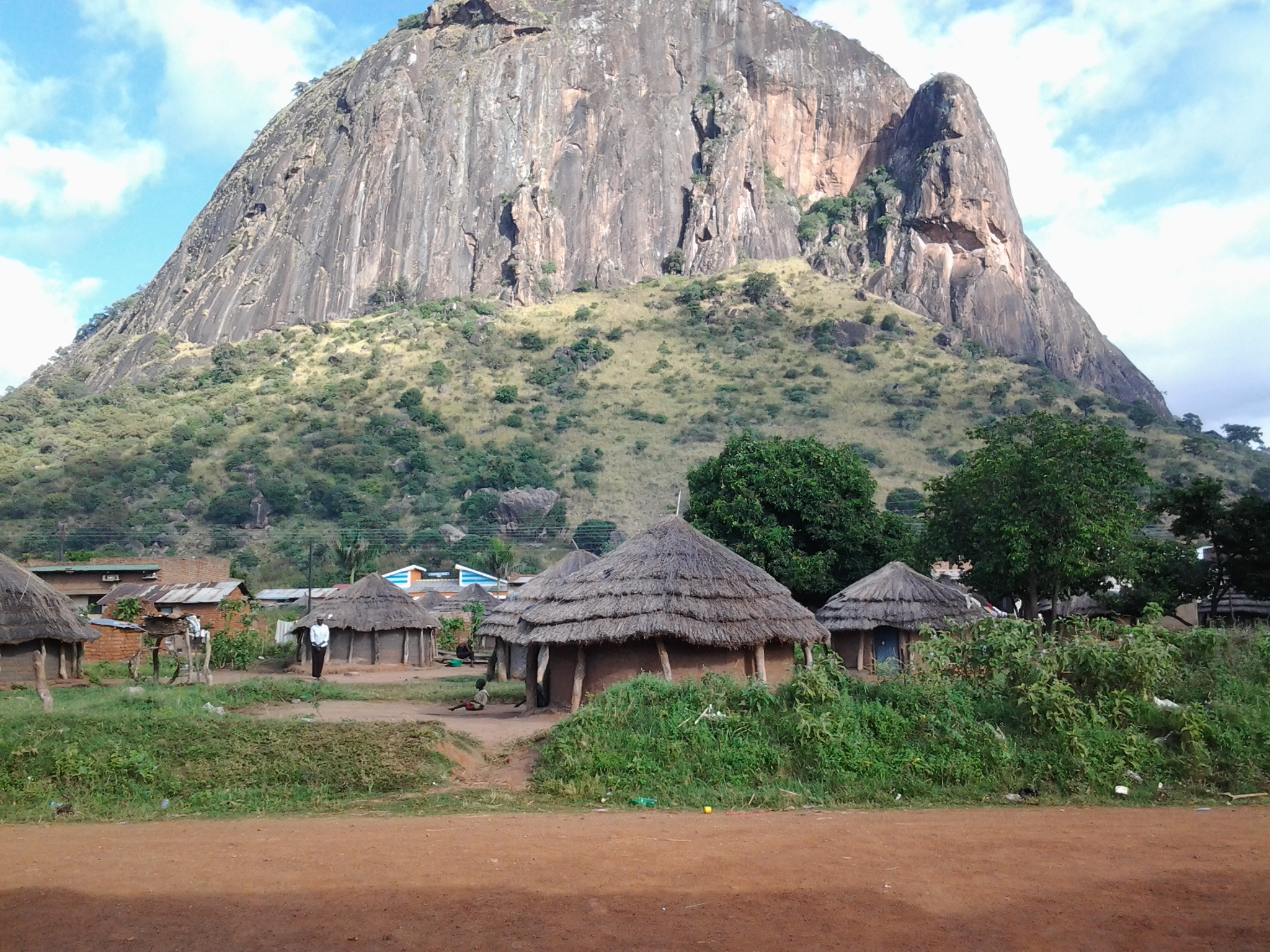
Agago hills

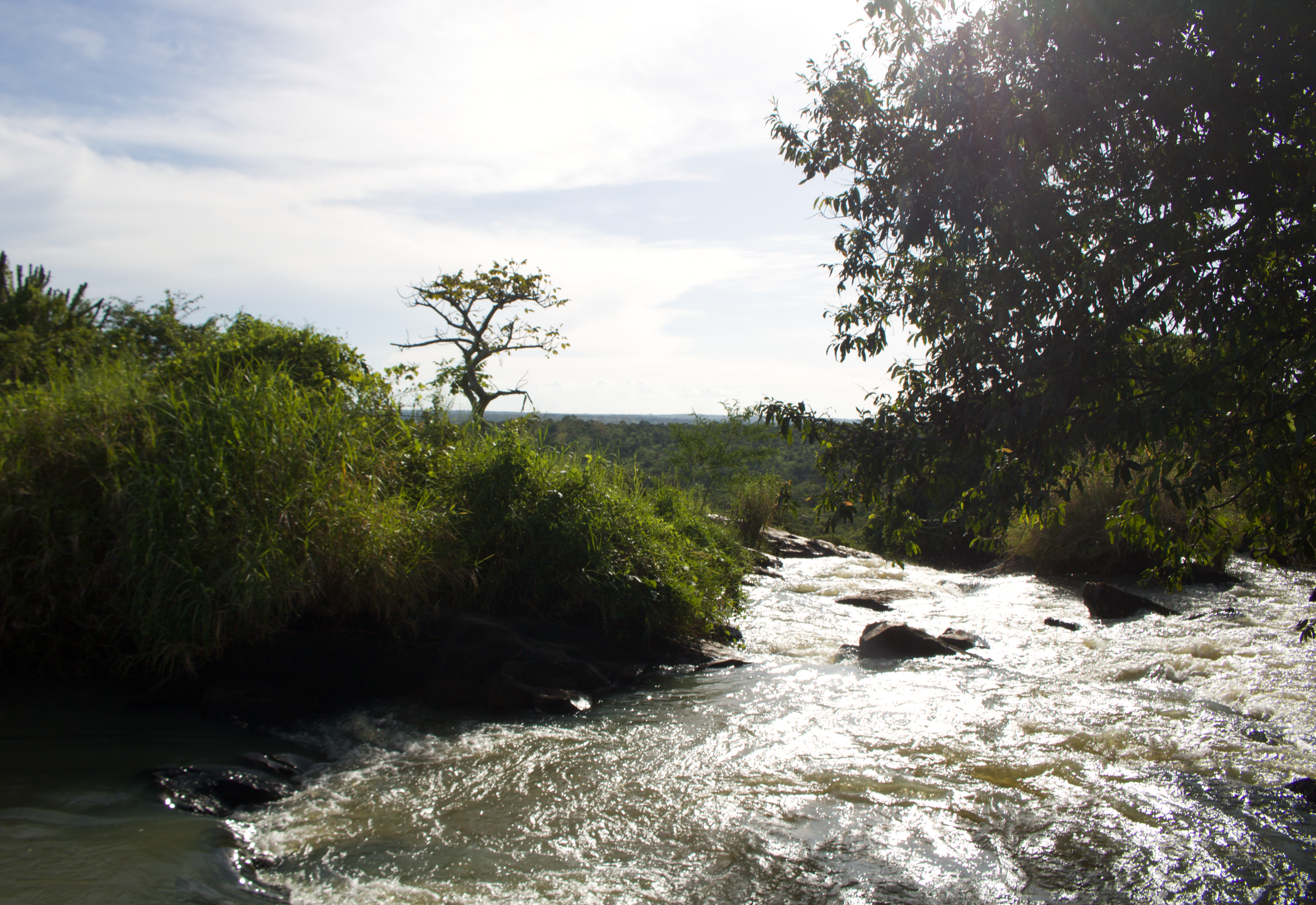
Start of Aruu on river Agago which flows through Agogo district, Uganda.

The Agago District is a Ugandan district located in the Northern Region of Uganda.

== Location ==
Agago District is bordered by Kitgum District to the north, Kotido District to the northeast, Abim District to the east, Otuke District, to the south, and Pader District to the west. Agago, the location of the district headquarters, lies approximately 80 kilometres (50 mi) southeast of Kitgum, the nearest large town. This location lies approximately 370 kilometres (230 mi), by road, north of Kampala, the capital of Uganda, and the largest city in that country. The coordinates of the district are:02 50N, 33 20E.

== Overview ==
Agago District is one of the newest districts in Uganda. It was established by Act of Parliament and began functioning on 1 July 2010. Prior to that date, it was part of Pader District. The district is part of the Acholi sub-region, together with: 1. Amuru District 2. Gulu District 3. Kitgum District 4. Lamwo District 5. Nwoya District and 6. Pader District.

== Population ==
In 1991, the national population census estimated the district population at 100,700. In 2002, the population of Agago District was recorded at approximately 184,000. In 2014, during the national population census and household survey, the population of the district was enumerated at 227,792.

== Economy ==
- Maize
- Sorghum
- Trade
- Fishing
- Livestock farming

== Livestocks ==
- Cattle
- Goat
- Poutry

== See also ==
- Agago
- Pader District
- Acholi
- The Acholi
- Northern Uganda
- Uganda Districts
