= African dance =

Body movement-centered performing arts developed by African people

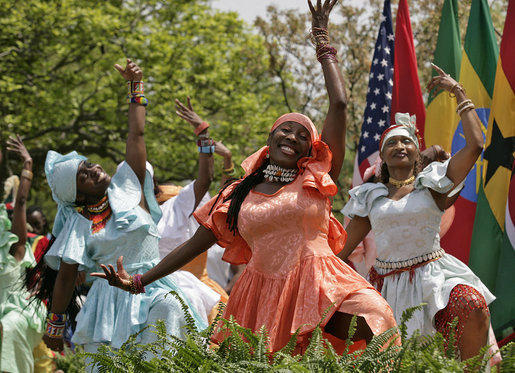
Members from the Kankouran West African Dance Company perform at a ceremony in the Rose Garden, White House, in 2007

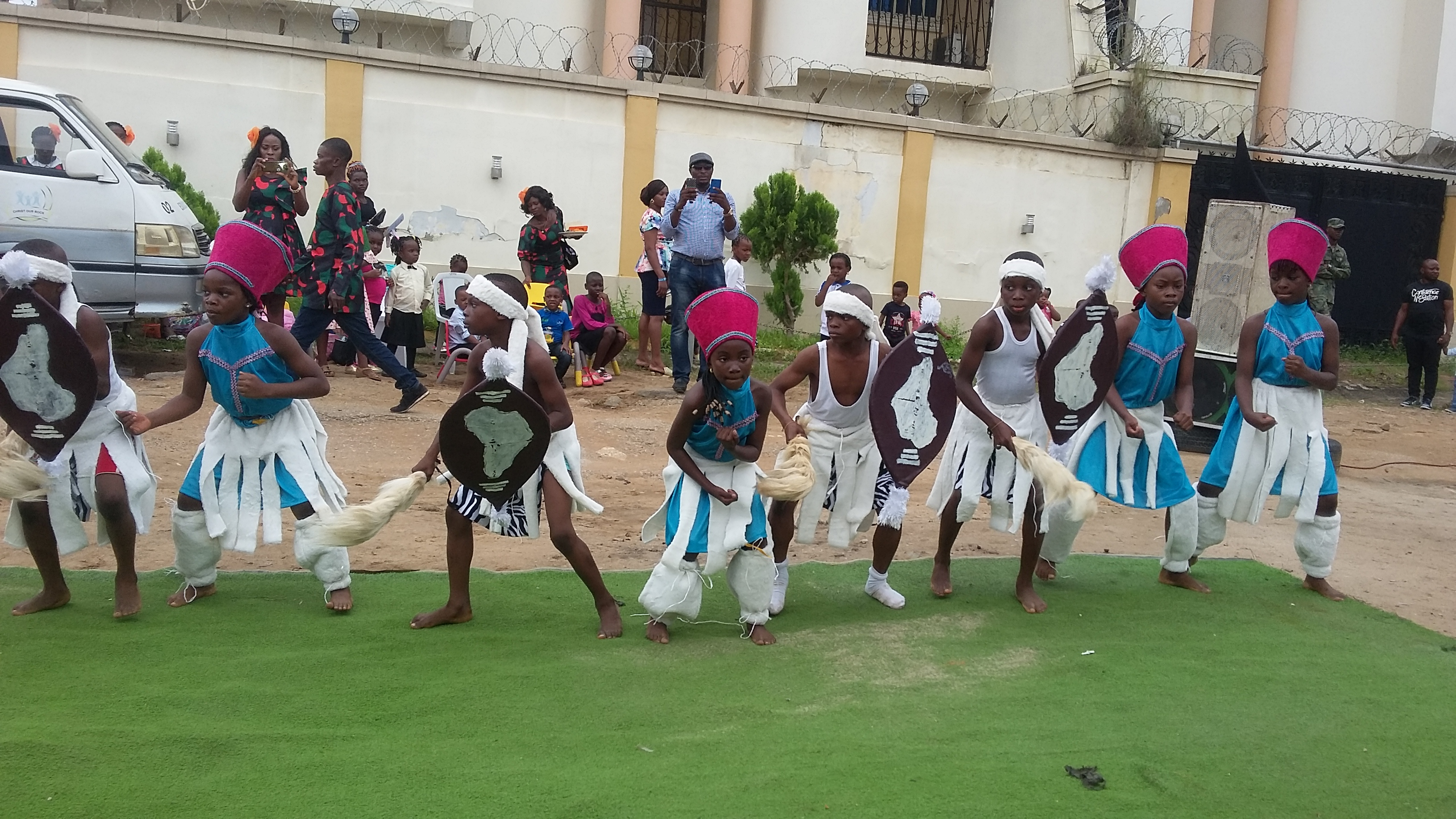
African dance

African dance (also Afro dance, Afrodance and Afro-dance) refers to the various dance styles of sub-Saharan Africa. These dances are closely connected with the traditional rhythms and music traditions of the region. Music and dancing are an integral part of many traditional African societies. Songs and dances facilitate teaching and promoting social values, the celebration of special events and major life milestones, the performance of oral history and other recitations, and spiritual experiences. African dance uses the concepts of polyrhythm and total body articulation. African dances are often a collective activity performed in large groups, with significant interaction between dancers and onlookers.

== History ==
African dance refers mainly to the dance styles of Sub-Saharan Africa, of which many are based on traditional rhythms and music traditions of the region. Modern African dance styles are deeply rooted in culture and tradition. Many tribes have a role solely for the purpose of passing on the tribe's dance traditions; dances which have been passed down through the centuries, often unchanged, with little to no room for improvisation. Each tribe developed its own unique style of dance, falling into three categories based on purpose.

- The first is religious dancing, which many tribes purport enhances peace, health, and prosperity. Religious dances often involved masqueraders, performing as both the spirits and those who placated them. Religion and spirituality infused every part of traditional African life, and continues to affect African dance today.
- The second is griotic, and was a type of dance that told a story. It is named after a griot, which is a term for a traditional storyteller in West Africa. Certain griotic dances were only danced by the tribe's griot; today, troupes perform the same dances that were once exclusive to the griot.
- The third type is ceremonial. These dances are performed at ceremonies such as weddings, anniversaries, and rites of passage.

However, many dances did not have only one purpose. Rather, there was often one primary purpose, that blended into many secondary purposes. Dance was often very important to the maintenance of a ruler's status in the tribal society. Colonialism and globalization have resulted in the eradication of certain styles of African dance. Other styles have been blended together, or mixed with dance styles outside of Africa.

==== African dance in the context of slavery ====
As people were taken from Africa to be sold as slaves, especially starting in the 1500s, they brought their dance styles with them. Entire cultures were imported into the New World, especially those areas where slaves were given more flexibility to continue their cultures and where there were more African slaves than Europeans or indigenous Americans, such as Brazil. African dance styles were merged with new cultural experiences to form new styles of dance. For example, slaves responded to the fears of their masters about high-energy styles of dance with changing stepping to shuffling. However, in North America, slaves did not have as much freedom to continue their culture and dance. In many cases, these dances have evolved into modern dance styles, such as African-American dance and Brazilian dance. For example, the Calenda evolved in Brazil from tribal dance. The Calenda then evolved into the Cakewalk, which was danced originally to mock plantation owners; it then evolved into the Charleston. Capoeira was a martial art practiced originally in Africa which the enslaved Africans masked as a form of dance in order to not arouse the suspicion of plantation owners.

== Characteristics ==
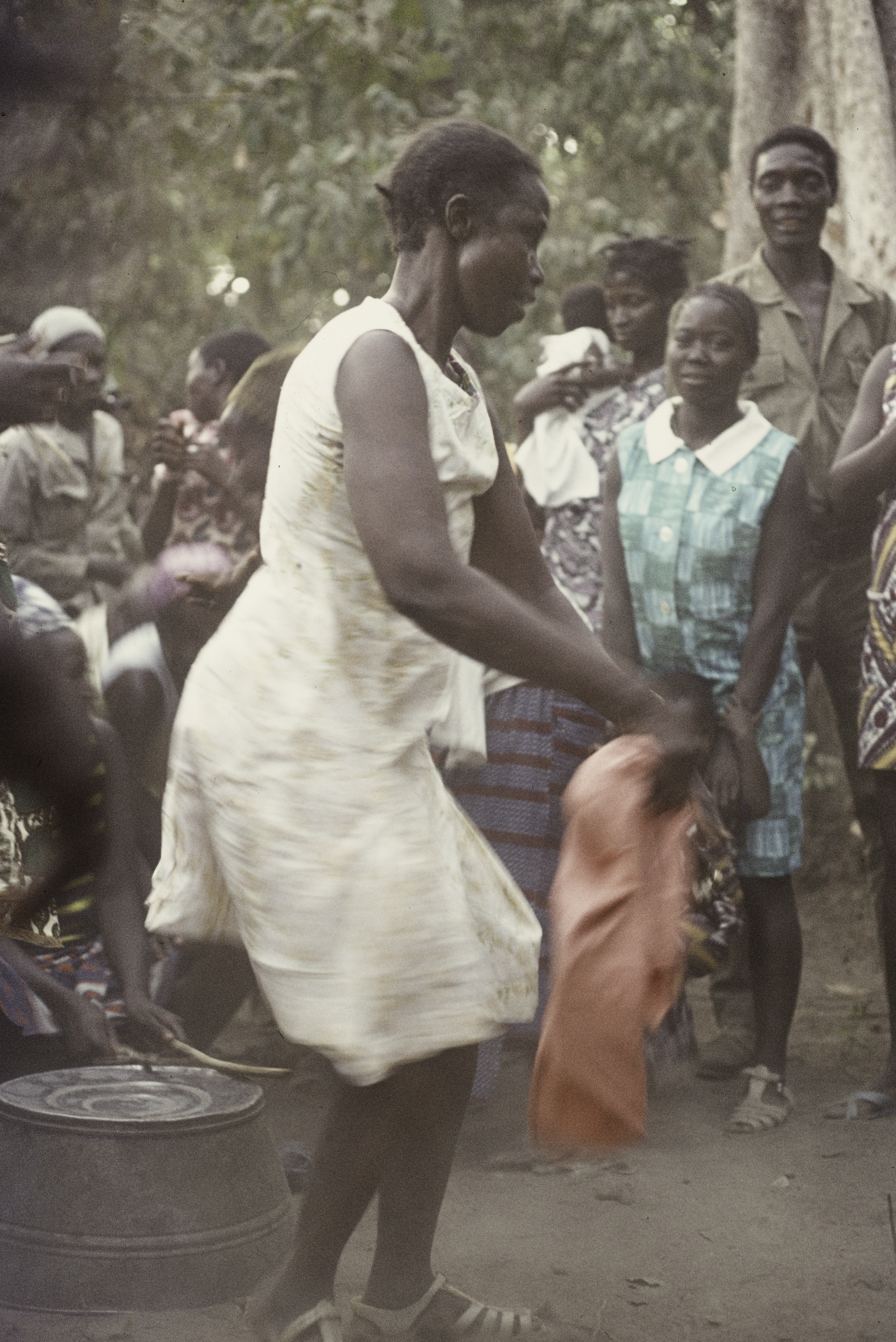
Female dancer at a party in Canjambari, Guinea-Bissau, 1974

Traditional dance in Africa occurs collectively, expressing the values and desires of the community more than that of individuals or couples. Although dances may appear spontaneous, they are usually strictly choreographed, limiting improvisation as it places the focus on the individual over the group. Early outsider commentaries noted the absence of the partner dancing style that was popular in Europe and North America: such dancing was thought to be immoral or in poor taste in many traditional African societies. An example of touching being a taboo in African dance can be seen in the Yoruba tribe. When watching the Yoruba dance, you will rarely see them touching one another or dancing with a partner except under some special circumstances. The only African country whose traditional dances involve partners is Cameroon.

Dances are usually segregated by sex, where gender roles in children and other community structures such as kinship, age, and political status are often reinforced. Many dances are divided by gender, as a result of associations with gender-divided labor, as well as cultural beliefs about gender roles and gender expressions. Dances celebrate the passage from childhood to adulthood or spiritual worship. Among the Lunda people of Zambia, for example, young girls remain in seclusion for months to practice the dance for their coming of age ritual.

In traditional African societies, children begin to learn their traditional songs, rhythms, and dances from the moment of birth, starting with the lullabies sung by their mothers. While carried on their mother's backs during day-to-day work and social events, they are exposed to the music that their mothers are singing or listening to. Thomas Edward Bodwich, an early European observer, noted that "children will move their heads and limbs, while on their mother's backs, in exact unison with the tune which is playing." Many traditional African children's games, particularly in western and central Africa, include elements that promote the child's ability to understand rhythms. When children are old enough to attempt the dance moves, they imitate accomplished older dancers until they can replicate the dances precisely. They are only permitted to improvise when they have mastered the prescribed choreography.

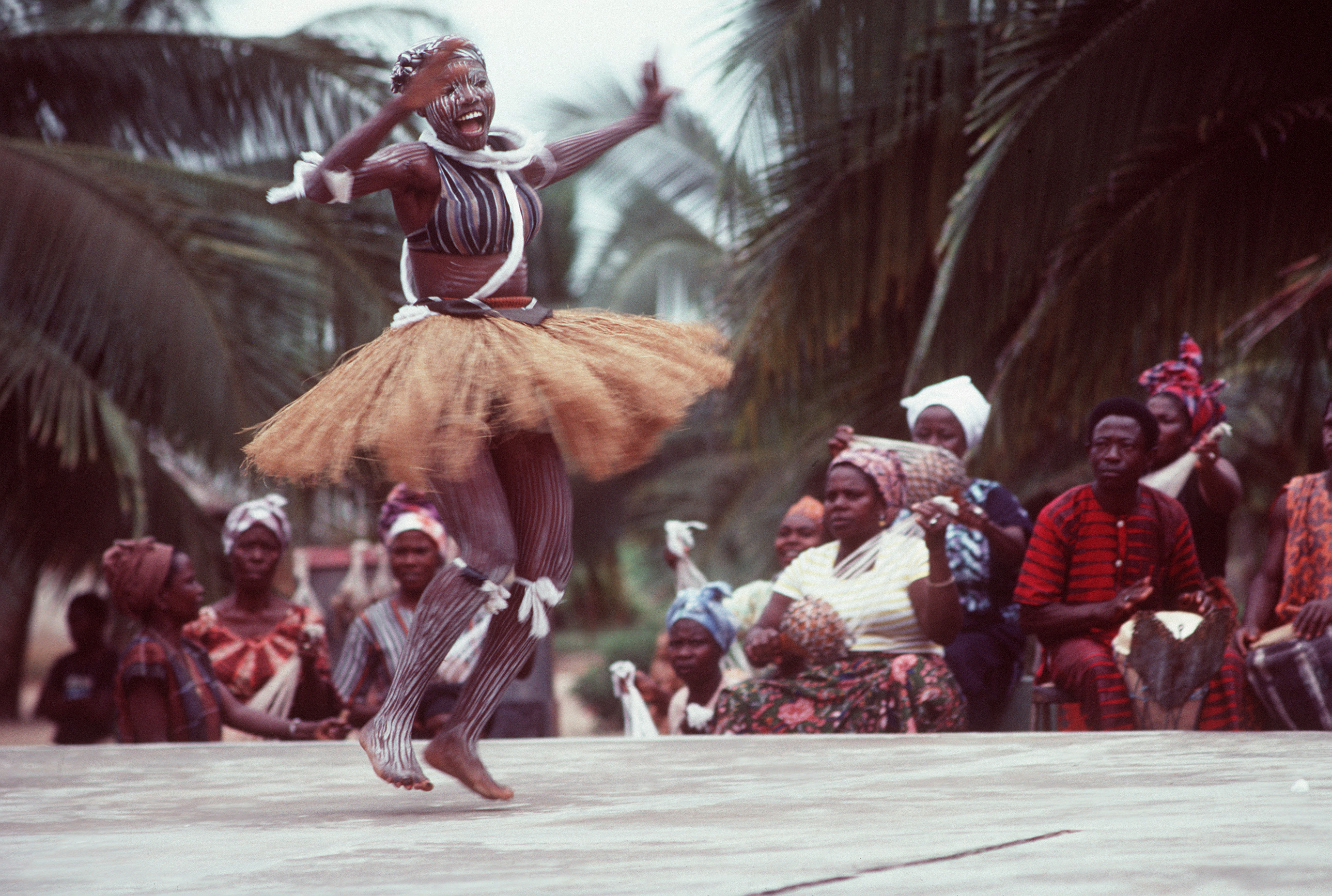
An African woman, wearing native garments, performs during a visit from participants in the West Africa Training Cruise 1983.

Musical accompaniment for African dances is highly varied. Most dances make use of the human voice in the form of singing, shouting, recitations, grunts, whispering, and other vocalizations. Many groups use drums. In an African community, coming together in response to the beating of the drum is an opportunity to give one another a sense of belonging and of solidarity, a time to connect with each other and be part of a collective rhythm of the life in which young and old, rich and poor, men and women are all invited to contribute to the society. On the other hand, nomadic groups such as the Maasai do not traditionally use drums.

Many African dances are polyrhythmic, this means that they are using two or more conflicting rhythms simultaneously. Dancers may synchronize the movements of different body parts to different rhythms, or alternate movements with fluidity between rhythms. Dancers in Nigeria, for example, commonly combine at least two rhythms in their movement, or three if they are particularly talented. Any more than that is a rare feat. Nigeria is just one example as polyrhythms are also commonly seen in many other African dances. Those participating in a dance may also add rhythmic components independent of those heard in the music. Very complex movements are possible even though the body does not move through space.

Dance historian Jacqui Malone describes how different groups use body parts in distinct ways: "The Anlo-Ewe and Lobi of Ghana emphasize the upper body, while the Kalabari of Nigeria give a subtle accent to the hips. The Akan of Ghana use the feet and hands in specific ways. Strong contraction-release movements of the pelvis and upper torso characterize both male and female dancing in Agbor."

== Notable dances ==
Specific notable African dances, divided by region, include:

=== Eastern Africa ===
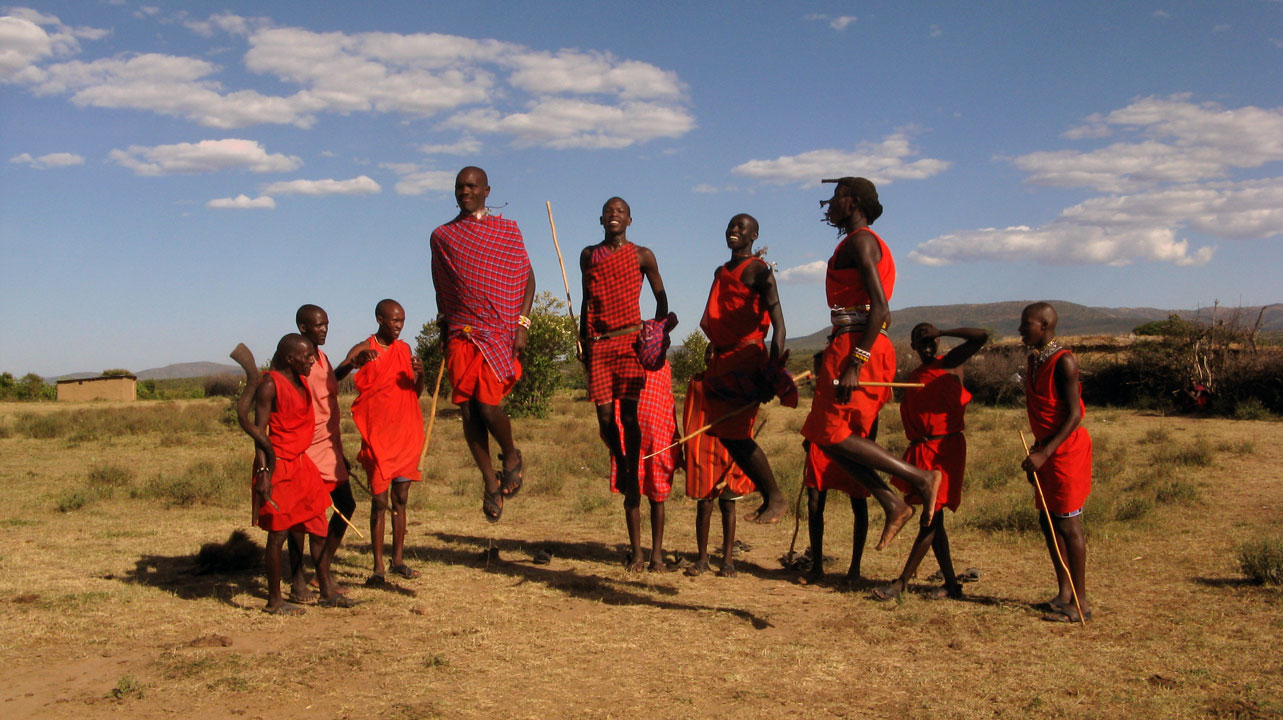
Traditional Maasai jumping dance

- Adumu: a Maasai jumping dance performed during the warriors' coming of age ceremony. A circle is formed by the warriors, and one or two at a time will enter the center to begin jumping. Members of the group may raise the pitch of their voices based on the height of the jump.

=== Southern Africa ===
Mohobelo (Striding Dance)

Umteyo (Shaking Dance)

- Indlamu: a stamping line dance performed by young men which comes from the Nguni people of Southern Africa, with numerous variations depending on the tribe.
- Jerusarema: a dance of Zimbabwean origin, characterized by quick, powerful movements and lunges performed from a crouched position.
- Mohobelo: the "striding dance" of the Sotho of Southern Africa also features leaping, kicking, sliding, and sinuous movements close to the ground.
- Mokhibo: the "shoulder dance" is also predominantly seen in the southern part of Africa, specifically in Lesotho. It is done by women. The dance comprises artistic and rhythmic movements of shoulders.
- Muchongoyo: a Zimbabwean dance performed by men, with participation from women in the form of singing and playing of instruments as well as dancing along on the sidelines. The women sometimes form a line and dance around the men. The Muchongoyo is a spiritual dance performed to celebrate important events and connect participants to the divine.
- Umteyo: a Xhosa dance performed by young men, in which the whole torso is undulated rapidly. The Xhensa dance is a similar form performed by older men, accompanied by clapping, singing, and roaring.
- Ukusina: a Zulu women's dance performed in South Africa during Umemulo, the women's coming of age ceremony.

=== Western Africa ===
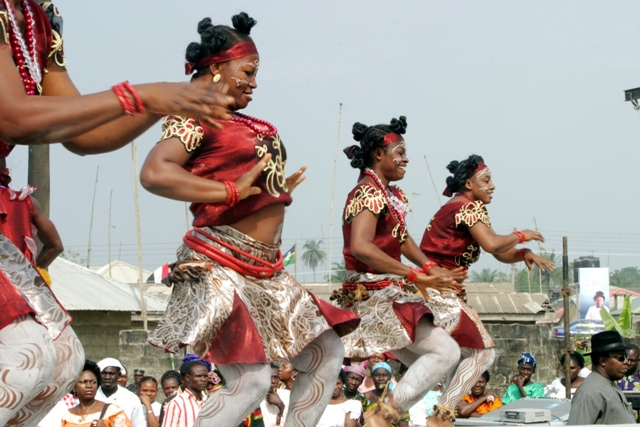
Dancers in Akwa Ibom, Nigeria

- Agahu: a circle dance created prior to World War II by Egun speakers in Benin speaking people of Ketonu, possibly as a modification of a dance style called "gome".
- Agbekor: a warrior's dance that originated with the Fon and Ewe peoples of West Africa. This dance is performed with horsetails, and the movements mimic battlefield tactics such as stabbing with the end of the horsetail.
- Assiko: a partner dance which originated with the Bassa people of Cameroon.
- Kpanlogo: a Ghanaian dance that originated with the Ga people around the 1960s, Kpanlogo is a free-flowing highlife dance form performed to conga-like drums.
- Kakilambe: a West African ritual dance of uncertain geographical origin involving ropes and a central figure in a mask.
- Moribayassa: a solo dance from the Malinke people of Guinea, performed by a woman to celebrate overcoming significant hardship. The dancer, wearing old clothing, dances around the village while singing, followed by musicians and other women. She concludes by changing into a new outfit and burying her old clothes in a special spot.
- Agbadza: original rhythm and dance of west Africa. Benin, Togo and Ghana use this music very well.
- Yankadi: originating with the Mandinka people of West Africa, this slow group dance is performed by men and women, and is usually followed by the faster Macru dance.
- Gazo: the traditional music of Togo

Dance	Purpose	Country / Ethnic group
Adowa	Funerals	Ghana / Ashanti
Agbadza	Celebration	Ghana / Ewe
Agwara	Courtship	Uganda / Alur
Soukous	Celebration	Congo (DRC)
Akogo	Courtship	Uganda / Iteso
Amaggunju	Entertainment	Uganda / Buganda
Ambas-i-bay	Celebration	Cameroon
Bakisiimba	Celebration	Uganda / Buganda
Bikutsi	Celebration	Cameroon
Bwola	Celebration	Uganda / Acholi
Coupé-Décalé	Celebration	Côte d'Ivoire
Ding Ding	Celebration	Uganda / Acholi
Ekitaguriro	Celebration	Uganda / Banyankole
Ekizino	Courtship	Uganda / Bakiga
Entog	Gaze	Uganda / Lugbara
Entogoro	Gaze	Uganda / Banyoro, Batooro
Gombey	Harvest	Senegal
Kete	To honor	Ghana/ Ashanti
Kakilambe	Fertility ritual	Guinea or Mali / Baga people
Kwassa kwassa	Celebration	Congo (DRC)
Lamban	Celebration	Guinea, Senegal, Mali
Larakaraka	Courtship	Uganda / Acholi
Makossa	Celebration	Cameroon
Mapouka	Ceremonial	Côte d'Ivoire
Mwaga	Courtship	Uganda / Bagisu
Ndombolo	Courtship	Congo (DRC)
Owaro		Uganda / Samia-Bugwe
Runyege	Celebration / Courtship	Uganda / Banyoro, Batooro
Sabar	Celebration	Senegal/ Wolof people
Sunu	Wedding	Guinea, Mali / Mandinka
Tamenaibuga	Friendship	Uganda / Basoga
Ukusina	Rite of passage	South Africa
Zaouli	Celebration and funeral	Côte d'Ivoire / Guro
Zouglou	Celebration	Côte d'Ivoire
Naleyo	Celebration	Uganda / Karamajong
Edonga	Celebration	Uganda / Karamajong

== Modern dances ==
Afrofusion is a dance style concept introduced by South African choreographer-dancer Sylvia Glasser known as Magogo in the 1970s. The Sylvia Glasser Contemporary Dance Group was established by Glasser in 1971. Sylvia Glasser's protégés consist of international contemporary dance household names including Gregory Maqoma and Vincent Mantsoe. Mantsoe was a part of the earliest groups who performed Glasser's historic "San trance" dancing work, Transformations. Afro fusion gained mainstream popularity in African countries such as Namibia and Zambia. Somatic techniques for instance Alexander Technique and release were refined and commixed with African dance styles including pantsula and kwassa kwassa resulting in the hybrid dance style.

American choreographer and dancer Chuck Davis is thought to be most recognized for formally introducing African dance styles and traditions on a professional level to America. The DanceAfrica festival founded in 1977 influenced many other cities to partake in African dance culture, it also presents and celebrates African dancers.

In the 21st century African dances became more globally popularized, modern, vast and diverse resulting in the dance genre being largely referred to as afro dance sometimes spelled afro-dance, instead of "African dance". Popular modern afro-dance styles are performed via diverse usage such as in music videos and Grammy Awards performances. These internationally popularized afro-dances include, but are not limited to kwassa kwassa, vosho, kizomba, jaiva, azonto, pantsula, gwara gwara, skwelewu, bhenga, shaku shaku, s'bujwa, amapiano dances and so forth.

== See also ==
- African-American dance
- Middle Eastern dance
- Ball culture
- List of African folk dances
- Rhythm and dance

== Bibliography ==
- Keïta, Mamady (1999). A Life for the Djembe – Traditional Rhythms of the Malinke. Arun-Verlag. ISBN 3-935581-52-1.
- Malone, Jacqui (1996). Steppin' on the Blues: the Visible Rhythms of African American Dance. University of Illinois Press. OCLC 891842452.
- Tracey, Hugh (1952). African Dances of the Witwatersrand Gold Mines. African Music Society.
- Welsh-Asante, Kariamu (2000). Zimbabwe Dance: Rhythmic Forces, Ancestral Voices: an Aesthetic Analysis. Africa World Press. ISBN 978-0-86543-493-6.
- Welsh-Asante, Kariamu (2009). African Dance. Infobase Publishing. ISBN 978-1-4381-2427-8.
