= Ekiria Kiria =

Ekiria Kiria is a traditional folk dance performed by the Teso or Iteso people of Eastern Uganda. This cultural expression involves participation from both men and women, who gracefully move their bodies in synchrony with the rhythmic beats of the Ekiria Kiria. The Dance is believed to have been performed by the Teso people for centuries and has evolved over time and been influenced by other dance forms from neighboring regions like Bwola dance of the Acholi people, Agwara dance of the Alur people of West Nile. Ekiria Kiria is also performed by school students to express the love and unity in their communities.

== See also ==
- Agwara
- Larakaraka
- Ekitaguriro
