= Myel lyel =

Acholi traditional dance

Myel lyel, also known as Myel Awal, is a traditional dance that originates from the Acholi people in Northern Uganda. It is performed during funeral rites to express grief and mourning for the deceased as men and women dance around the burial site. It was common in the past 2 decades. Acholi culture is diverse with other traditional dances performed in different occasions or cultural gatherings. The Acholi people settled in the districts of Lamwo, Gulu, Pader, Kitgum, Agago.

== See also ==
- Larakaraka
- Otole dance
- Bwola
- Dingi dingi
