= Oseke =

Oseke is a detached flute traditional wind instrument originating from the Alur tribe of the West Nile region of Uganda. This unique instrument is known for its distinctive playing technique, which closely resembles that of the agwara, a side-blown horn. The Oseke detached flute is not only used for musical performances but also serves a practical purpose in coaxing wild animals.

== Characteristics and design ==
The Oseke detached flute is classified as an aerophone, a type of instrument that produces sound through a vibrating column of air. Unlike brass instruments, which are played using buzzed lips, the Oseke flute relies on a different method of sound production.

The flute is typically crafted from locally available materials, ensuring that it remains an integral part of the Alur's cultural heritage. The design of the Oseke detached flute allows for a range of pitches and tones, making it a versatile instrument in the hands of skilled players.

== Playing style and classification ==
Playing the Oseke detached flute requires a specific technique that involves precise control of breath and finger placement. This technique is similar to that used for the agwara, allowing for a seamless transition between the two instruments for those familiar with both. As an aerophone, the Oseke detached flute belongs to a broader category of instruments that includes various types of flutes and horns. Aerophones are characterized by their method of sound production, which involves the vibration of air within the instrument.
