= Gaze (dance) =

Gaze is a traditional dance of the Lugbara people of Northern Uganda and parts of the WestNile sub-region. The dance is performed by young people who have enough energy during traditional functions like marriage and festivals like "Okuza", a traditional Lugbara festival to celebrate culture and heritage, Lugbara people are the largest tribe in West Nile.

== Performance ==
Gaze dance is performed by young people or children who have enough energy and strength to celebrate and appreciate their growth.

== See also ==
- Otole
- Larakaraka
- Agwara
