= Tamena Ibuga =

Traditional harvest dance of the Basoga people in Uganda

- Genre: Traditional folk dance
- Instrument(s): Panpipes, drums, xylophones, rattles
- Inventor: Basoga people
- Origin: Busoga, Uganda

Tamena Ibuga dance also known as the harvest celebration dance of the Basoga people, is a traditional dance originating from the kingdom of Busoga in eastern Uganda. This dance holds great significance as it represents the spirit of friendship and unity among the Basoga community. Typically performed during the harvest festival, Tamena Ibuga serves as a reminder and encouragement to the Basoga people to continue their diligent harvesting efforts. Through this exceptional dance, the Basoga people celebrate and honor the fruitful cultivation of their lands, acknowledging the bountiful harvest they have achieved. The dance is also performed during special community gatherings like weddings and initiation ceremonies as a symbol of peace and unity. The dance futures energetic performance with drums and shakers accompanying the rhythm.

== History ==
Tamena Ibuga dance, with its origins rooted in the strong bond between two close friends, dates back to a time when camaraderie and shared experiences were at the core of their friendship. One fateful day, these friends embarked on a beer-drinking escapade, a customary practice involving the usage of a gourd as the vessel. However, the inevitable effects of excessive alcohol consumption led to a disagreement, escalating into a physical altercation. Tragically, their cherished gourd, a symbolic shared artifact, succumbed to the force of their fight, exacerbating the rift between them. Recognizing the potential impact on both their friendship and the harmony within the community, the insightful members devised a dance, serving as a unifying force among the people.

== See also ==
- Larakaraka
- Bwola
- Agwara
