= Alur Parliament =

Parliament of the Alur Kingdom
- Coat of arms of Alur

Type
- Type: Unicameral

Leadership
- Chiefs Speaker: Rwoth Kerunega Orom Jepthar
- Council Chairman: Uluba John

Structure
- Seats: 75
- Political groups: His Majesty's Government (11): Jadipu and Ministers (11); Council of Chiefs (56): Hereditary Chiefs (56); Atyak Royal Council (8): Royal Councillors (8)

Elections
- Voting system: Heredity and Appointment by the Rwoth Ubimu

Meeting place
- Kaal Atyak Palace; Zombo, Uganda

The Parliament of the Alur Kingdom is the legislature of the Alur Kingdom, one of the recognised traditional kingdoms in Uganda.

The Alur Parliament consists of the Council of Chiefs, which itself consists of the 56 hereditary chiefs within the Kingdom, the Atyak Royal Council, which is appointed by the king, as well as the Jadipu and the 10 other ministers of the Alur government. Parliament is charged with legislating by-laws, legislating on cultural matters, passing the kingdom's yearly budget and with scrutinising the royal government, but it is prevented from legislating on political matters.
