= Philip Rauni III =

King of the Alur Kingdom since 2006

Rwoth Ubimu of Alur
- Reign: 19 May 2006 – present
- Coronation: 31 October 2010
- Predecessor: Oyoma Jobi II
- Born: 1981 (age 44–45); Bugolobi, Kampala, Uganda
Names
- Philip Olarker Rauni III
- Religion: Christian

Philip Olarker Rauni III (also spelled Phillip; born 1981) is the 33rd Rwoth Ubimu, or king, of the Alur Kingdom in Uganda. He has reigned as king of the Alur people since the death of his grandfather, Oyoma Jobi II, in 2006.

== Early life and reign ==
Philip was born in 1981 and grew up in the Bugolobi neighbourhood of Uganda's capital, Kampala. Raised by his mother, who he has described as a strict disciplinarian, Philip had a comparatively normal childhood away from the Alur court.

After primary and secondary education in Uganda, Philip Rauni III studied in the United Kingdom, where he received a master's degree in economics from Loughborough University. He subsequently worked as a banking managed at HSBC.

Following the death of his grandfather, Rwoth Jobi II, in 2006, he was proclaimed Rwoth Ubimu and later returned to Uganda. He was crowned on 31 October 2010.
