= Gaze (disambiguation) =

The gaze is a concept in visual culture dealing with the process of self-awareness or awareness of others.

Gaze may also refer to:

- Gaze (album), by the Beautiful South
- Gaze (band), a Canadian pop band
- Gaze (film festival), an annual LGBT event in Dublin, Ireland
- Gaze (physiology), a coordinated motion of the eyes and neck
- Gaze (surname), a list of people with the name
- The Gaze (novel), a 1999 novel by Elif Shafak
- Gaze (dance), Ugandan traditional dance

== Categories of music ==
- Shoegaze, a fuzzy genre of alt rock
- Blackgaze
- Nu gaze

== See also ==
- Gêrzê County or Gaize County, Tibet
