= Cowhide =

Leather of cattle with hairs attached

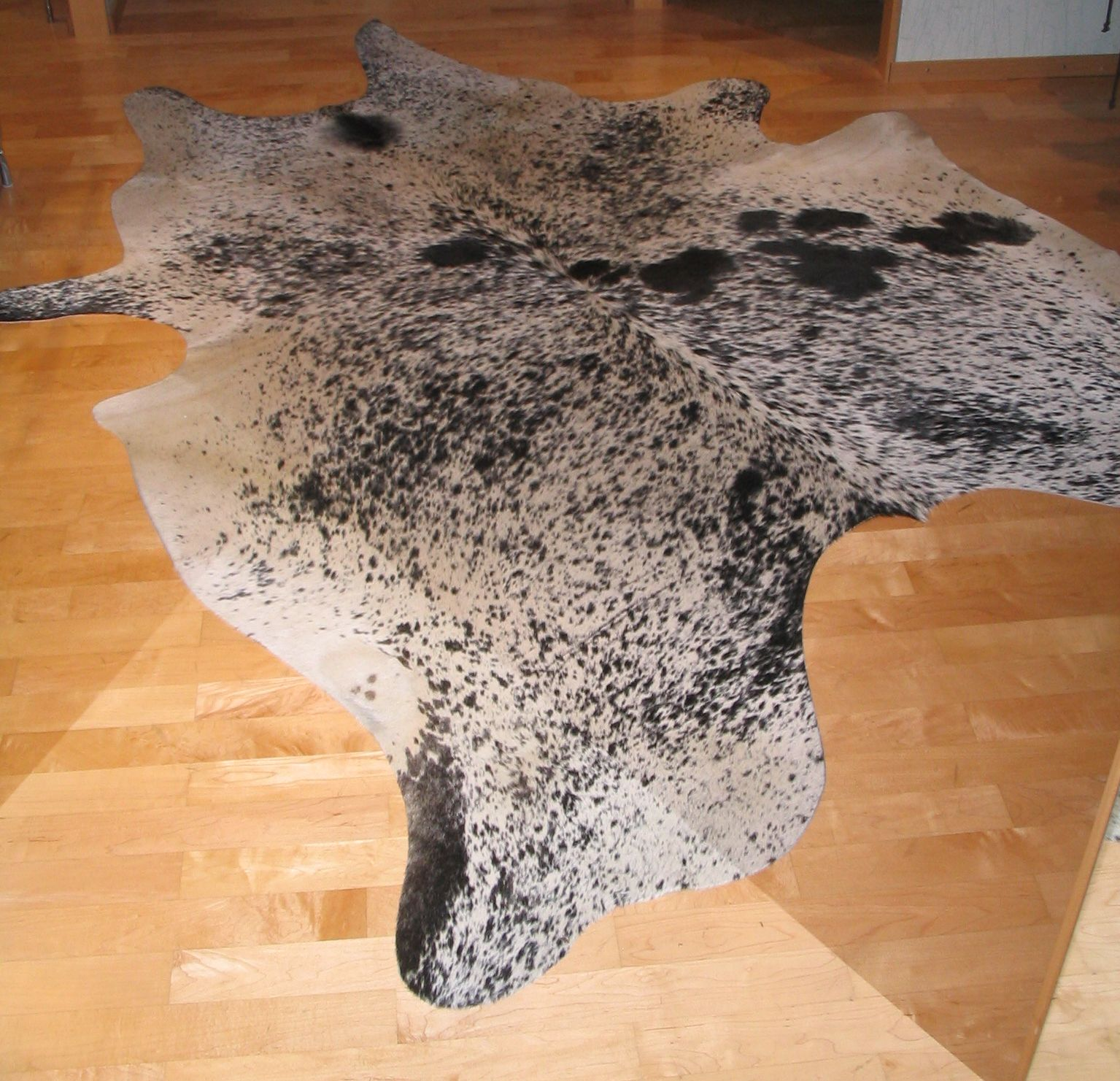
Cowhide in a furrier's shop.

Cowhide is the natural, unbleached skin and hair of a cow. It retains the original coloring of the animal. Cowhides are a product of the food industry from cattle. Cowhide is frequently processed into leather.

== Process ==
Once a cow has been killed, the skin is removed. It is then selected in the raw state, at the very first moment when it is salted. It is organized by size and color. In the tannery, a traditional hair on hide tanning method is employed to ensure that the hide is soft, and less susceptible to odour and moulting. It ensures that the cowhide will last longer. It is then naturally dried and the best hides are separated from the rest, with the ones that cannot be used in full as decorative items separated to be used as patchwork rugs. These are usually those with damage (for example cuts and other injuries to the skin during the life of the animal) that causes the skin to tear post drying.

== Use ==
Cowhide can be dyed to resemble skins such as tiger or zebra skins, but dyeing is usually reserved for the lower quality cowhides. The best quality hides are usually presented in their natural colors, which are based on the breed of the bovine.

=== Nguni culture ===
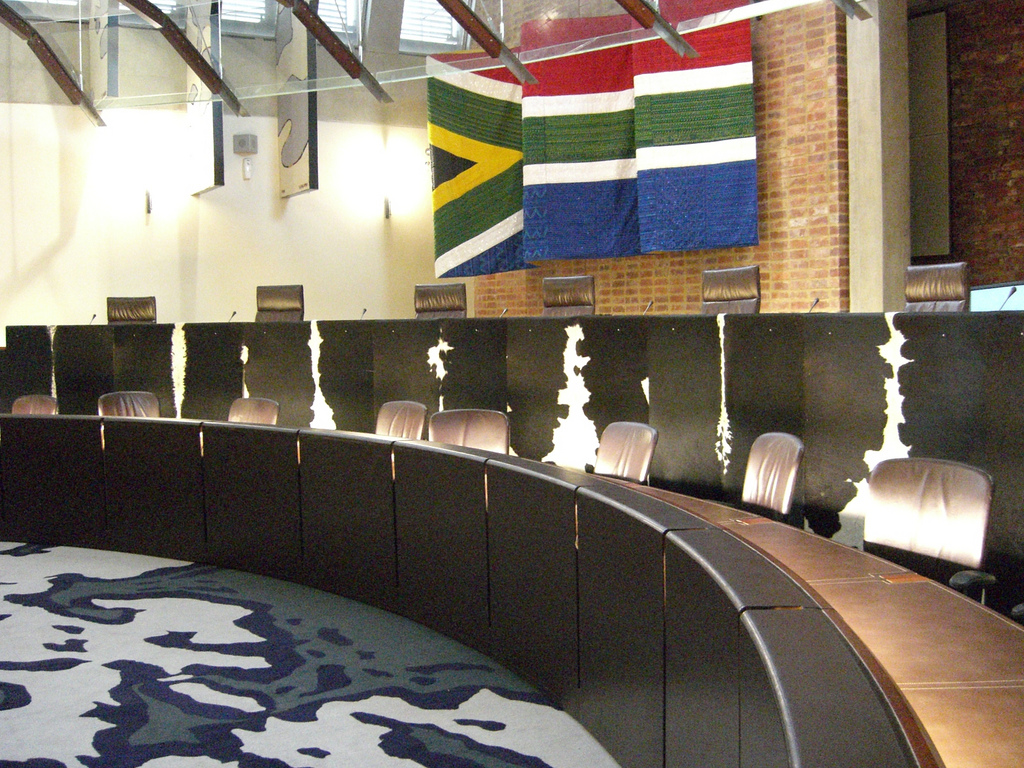
Nguni Cowhide, The judges' table in a courtroom of the Constitutional Court of South Africa

Among the southern African Zulu people, cowhide was employed in various ways, though it has recently been relegated to ceremonial use. Cowhide was used to make Nguni shields and the traditional skirt called the isidwaba. Men wore a calfskin flap, the ibeshu, to cover the buttocks, and the umutsha loin cloth was tied to the body with a cow hide belt. The iphovela was a headdress made of cow skin, and the ishoba or umshokobezi was a tufted cowtail used as an arm or leg decoration.
