= Moribayassa =

Traditional dance in Guinea

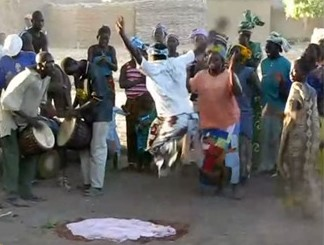
- Moribayassa dance performed in Guinea
- Etymology: "mori" means "death," while "bayassa" means "dance."
- Genre: Traditional dance
- Instrument(s): Drums, Bell
- Origin: Guinée

Moribayassa is a traditional dance that the Malinke people of West Africa first performed. Women generally engage in the dance to express their emotions and seek spiritual purification.

== History ==
The spiritual practices of the Malinke people are inextricably entwined with the history of Moribayassa. Women who have gone through a personal catastrophe, such as the death of a child, infertility, or illness, traditionally do the dance. The dance is thought to have the power to purge the women of harmful energy and restore their cosmic equilibrium. The terms "mori" and "bayassa," both of which imply "dance" in the Malinke language, are the origins of the name "Moribayassa." This reflects the notion that for the ladies who execute it, the dance signifies a rebirth or a coming back to life. The dance is often done by a group of women, who dress in vibrant costumes and hats. A group of musicians who play a range of instruments, such as the djembe, the balafon, and the kora, provide the music for Moribayassa. The drumming serves as the basis for the dance, and the music is brisk and rhythmic. Moribayassa's symbology is closely associated with the notion of rebirth and rejuvenation. Negative energies are thought to be released and beneficial energies are welcomed into the body through dance. In addition, it's viewed as a method to pay respect to the ancestors and establish a connection with the natural world's spirits.

In order to represent current issues and perspectives, Moribayassa has changed over time. For instance, several recent renditions of Moribayassa address topics like social justice and climate change. In these performances, the dance serves as a means of drawing attention to these problems and serving as an agent of change. As a way to celebrate life, pay homage to the ancestors, and establish a connection with nature, Moribayassa is still conducted today all over the world. It is an essential component of the Malinke people's cultural legacy and acts as a potent representation of resiliency, strength, and rejuvenation.

== Description ==
Women generally engage in the dance to express their emotions and seek spiritual purification. Moribayassa is a high-intensity dance in which participants forcefully shake their bodies to the beat of the drum. The dance is often done by a group of women, who dress in vibrant costumes and hats. In the Malinke tradition, moribayassa is done on a variety of occasions, including weddings, initiation rituals, and other important occasions. Women who have gone through a personal tragedy, such as the death of a child, infertility, or illness, typically perform the dance. The dance is thought to have the power to purge the women of harmful energy and restore their cosmic equilibrium.

The "djembe", a kind of West African drum, is generally used to open a Moribayassa performance. The beat begins slowly and then picks up tempo and intensity as the dance moves forward. The women cautiously begin to move their bodies before progressively speeding up as the pounding intensifies. The women start to shake their bodies fiercely as the dance goes on, frantically moving their hips, arms, and legs. Ululations, or high-pitched yells used to show delight and celebration, frequently accompany the movements. Moribayassa has gained popularity in recent years outside of West Africa, and dance troupes now perform the dance in nations all over the world. The dance has evolved to reflect modern problems and experiences, even though it still retains a strong connection to its spiritual origins. In the present day, for instance, some Moribayassa performances deal with topics like social justice and climate change. The dance is employed in these performances as a means of drawing attention to these problems and motivating change.

== Etymology ==
The term "Moribayassa" is derived from the Malinke language spoken by the Malinke people of West Africa. In Malinke, "mori" means "death," while "bayassa" means "dance." As a result, the term "Moribayassa" can be translated as "death dance." The name "Moribayassa" alludes to a rebirth or return to life. The dance is thought to be a means of releasing negative energies and inviting positive energies into the body. It is also regarded as a means of honoring ancestors and connecting with the spirits of the natural world. The term "Moribayassa" is unique to Malinke culture and is rarely heard outside of West Africa. The dance, on the other hand, has grown in popularity in recent years and is now performed by dance troupes all over the world. While the name may differ in different cultures and languages, the dance's core meaning and symbolism remain the same.

== Cultural material used ==
=== Costume ===
The dance's clothing, which represent the Malinke people's cultural values and beliefs, play a significant role in the performance. Depending on the region and the particular cultural traditions, different materials are utilized to make the costumes. The majority of the time, brightly colored textiles like cotton, silk, or batik are used to create the costumes. These fabrics are frequently decorated with elaborate patterns and designs that are made by stitching or dying processes.

Also typical of Moribayassa attire is beadwork. As the dancers move, the shimmering effect produced by the beads, which are sewed onto the fabric in elaborate designs, shimmers. The beads, which are frequently crafted from organic materials like shells, seeds, or bones, are thought to symbolize the abundance and splendor of the natural world. Another significant component of the Moribayassa attire is the headdress. The headdresses are frequently adorned with beads and other adornments and are typically created from feathers, shells, or other natural materials. The dancers' relationship with the spirits, as well as the might of nature and the ancestors, are represented by the headdresses. The dancers' jewelry, in addition to the textiles and materials utilized in their costumes, is a significant component of the performance. Frequently, beads, shells, or other natural materials are used to decorate the jewelry, which is frequently made of gold, silver, or other valuable metals. Wearing jewelry is a sign of status, money, and cultural identity. The fact that the Malinke people have a deep connection to nature is reflected in the usage of natural materials in their clothes and jewelry. To celebrate the beauty and wealth of the natural world and to recognize this link, natural materials were used to create the costumes and jewelry.

=== Cultural tools ===
The drum is one cultural tool used in the Moribayassa performance. A crucial component of the dance, the drumming provides the main rhythm for the dancers to move to. Typically, the drums used in Moribayassa are constructed from stretched-over animal skins or hollowed-out tree stumps. The drummers play the drums with sticks or their hands, producing a variety of rhythms and tones that serve as the dance's foundation. The bell is yet another significant piece of Moribayassa culture. One of the musicians plays the bell, a little metal instrument, during the concert. The bell gives the music depth and complexity by providing a rhythm that contrasts with the percussion. Depending on the unique cultural traditions and practices of the community, additional cultural instruments might be employed during the performance of Moribayassa in addition to the drums and bell. For instance, to provide texture and diversity to the music, certain tribes may use rattles, horns, or other percussion instruments. The cultural implements utilized in the Moribayassa performance are more than just musical instruments; they also hold spiritual and cultural value. For instance, it is thought that the drums have the ability to unite the dancers with their ancestors and the spirits of the natural world. The ancestors are said to be present during the dance and to guide and protect the dancers, and the bell is thought to represent their voice.

== Conclusion ==
Moribayassa is a powerful and energetic West African dance that reflects the spiritual and cultural traditions of the Malinke people. It has evolved over time to reflect current concerns and experiences while remaining true to its origins. Moribayassa is still performed today all over the world as a way to celebrate life, honor the ancestors, and connect with the natural world.
