= Alur Kingdom =

Kingdom within Uganda

Alur Kingdom Ker Alur (Alur)
- Flag Coat of arms
- Anthem: Ker Alur (English: "Alur kingdom")
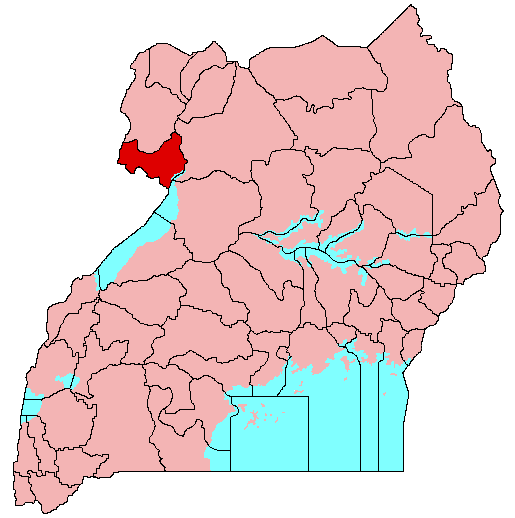
- Location of the Alur Kingdom (red) in Uganda (pink)
- Status: Traditional kingdom
- Capital: Zombo
- Official languages: Alur, English
- Ethnic groups: Alur
- Demonym: Alur
- Government: Constitutional monarchy
  - Monarch: Philip Rauni III
  - Prime Minister: Lawrence Opar Angala
- Legislature: Parliament

Establishment
  - Founded: 1490

Area
  - Total: 2,850.8 km^{2} (1,100.7 sq mi)

Population
  - 2024 census: 1,152,858 (2024)
  - Density: 404.4/km^{2} (1,047.4/sq mi)
- Currency: Ugandan shilling
- Time zone: UTC+3
- Calling code: 256

The Alur Kingdom is one of the 17 officially recognised traditional kingdoms in Uganda. Located in northwestern Uganda and coterminous with the Zombo District and Nebbi District, the kingdom is the home of the Alur people, who constitute roughly 2.3% of Uganda's total population. The kingdom is ruled by the Rwoth Ubimu (literally Supreme King), currently Philip Rauni III.

Ugandan law recognises Alur as a cultural institution explicitly without political power. The kingdom is tasked with promoting tradition, popular participation and unity among the people of the region. The Alur government operates development programs and institutions aimed at improving the standard of living for Alur people. Funds for the kingdom's administration and development projects are raised from assets like Crown lands and rents, Ugandan government grants, and private donations.

== History ==
The Alur Kingdom's origins can be traced back to the 1490s. One of the earliest recorded kings is Ngira II, who reigned from 1630. The British incorporated Alur into the Protectorate of Uganda at the end of the 19th century.

The Alur Kingdom managed to survive despite the overthrow and abolition of the Ugandan monarchies by Prime Minister Milton Obote in 1967, following the Mengo Crisis. The Alur monarchy is thereby the only traditional institution in Uganda which has operated uninterrupted since before Obote's abolition of traditional monarchies.

As such the Alur Kingdom was not part of the restoration of monarchies undertaken by the Yoweri Museveni government in 1993, having been in continual existence. Museveni's government did however restore the formal recognition of the Alur monarchy by the Ugandan central government.

== Government ==
The hereditary supreme traditional ruler of the Alur is the Rwoth Ubimu, who serves as the head of state of the Alur Kingdom and the unifying figure of the 56 Alur chiefdoms. As a constitutional monarchy, the Rwoth Ubimu is tasked with appointing a prime minister, called the Jadipu, who acts as the kingdom's head of government and leads its cabinet of ministers.

The legislature of the kingdom, called the Alur Parliament, is tasked with scrutinising the government, setting policy and enacting the yearly budget. The Parliament is a composite body consisting of the Council of Chiefs, the Atyak Royal Council, the Jadipu and the other cabinet ministers.
