= Kakilambe =

African dance

Kakilambe or Kaki lambe (sometimes spelled as "Kalilambe") is an African dance. It is a ritual dance.

There is contradictory information as to whether it is originated among the Baga people of Guinea or in Mali. It is also known in some other West African countries.

This name is also used to refer to different percussion patterns in African music, some of which are individual variations, and some differ significantly: some of them being in 6/8 and 12/8, while others in 4/4 time. Kakilambe is a dance as a symbol of the celebration of growth of crops, life, and mostly the birth of children. The Kakilambe brings all these blessings and they celebrate his coming with the dance called "Kakilambe".

Kakilambe is a masked dance that appears once a year or once every seven years. It is a special celebration where the elders of the village hold on to ropes that come from the mask. The dance begins slowly and questions are asked of the prophet about the year ahead. Will the crops grow, will the health be well, will children be born. Then, Kakilambe continues to dance but as he does, he grows to over twice the size and twirls and twirls around. The rhythm gets a little chaotic and then goes into a fast version of the rhythm/dance. It is three times faster than the original tempo. It gets very exciting as the answers to the questions are given to the elders and people celebrate.

The variant taught by Mamady Keïta is based on the music of Baga.

== See also ==
- African dance
- African music
- Djembe
