= Agbekor =

Agbekor (agbekɔ) is a type of music and a style of dance by the West African peoples of Ewe and Fon. It is an ancient dance once known as Atamga, Ga meaning 'great', Atam meaning 'oath'. It is now performed by the people of Dzogadze, a farming community near Akatsi in the Southern part of the Volta Region of Ghana. It is characterized by multiple percussion instruments that engage in highly polyrhythmic interactions. Today, it is used for cultural presentations, but in the past, it was an actual war dance, and the oath in question was an oath taken by the ancestors before going into battle. The lead drummer 'calls' the dancers to perform a specific movement, preceded and followed by "the call to turn." There is a slow section and a fast section, with 'interlude songs' or "hatsiatsia" songs" sometimes performed in between.

== See also ==
- African dance
- Ewe drumming
