= Isidwaba =

Traditional Zulu leather skirt

The isidwaba [isidʷaːɓa], a traditional Zulu leather skirt worn by married women, is made from the hide of animals that belonged to the woman's father. This article will illustrate how the traditional skirt is made and at which occasions it is worn. It further describes the various designs and patterns of an isidwaba and how they are perceived in society, including the symbolic anthropology associations of the isidwaba.

== Description of the Isidwaba ==
The isidwaba, which is also known as isikhakha, is a traditional Zulu leather skirt worn by a betrothed and married woman. It is made of cowhide or goatskin, as depicted on the South African Heritage Resource Agency website. The isidwaba has remained virtually unchanged since the 19th century whereas other traditional objects have undergone transformations both in form and material used to make them. The isidwaba is usually given as a gift by the father of the bride from the cow given to the bride-to-be for her Umemulo (Coming of Age) ceremony. She in turn will wear the leather skirt on the day of her wedding. The father of the bride will dress her with the isidwaba in the ancestor's hut. Sometimes the father will direct his eldest son in dressing the bride, this being a way of passing on the tradition. Women attach the importance in defining their marital status to isidwaba although it is also put forward that they place their greatest importance in the exchange of cattle in marriage transactions. Still, isidwaba remains an important and integral part of the married woman’s life to the extent that the women can only be freed from wearing isidwaba when they become menopausal. Importantly, when a woman gets married it is a transition from her father's homestead to that of her husband's. This is where isidwaba plays a critical role that affords her ancestral protection from her newfound ancestors (who at this point have not accepted her as a member of the homestead). It is only after her first child has been born that she is accepted as a member of the family. Isidwaba is usually made from a cowhide obtained from the woman's father's cattle. During ukwendisa – where the father of the bride supplies a beast that accompanies his daughter to her new homestead – the hide of the beast is sewn into her skirt for her to wear. Goat skin is also used, in other subcultures of the Zulu nation, to make isidwaba. These subcultures are usually located in the regions of the nation where goats thrive on the vegetation of the area, and are therefore more numerous than cattle. It is therefore not surprising that such areas would supply goat skin for the making of isidwaba.

== Processing of an Isidwaba ==
In the process of using cowhide to make an isidwaba, after the cow is slaughtered, the cowhide is stretched and dried in the sun for approximately three days. Thereafter, the hide is dipped into water for a period of seven days to decompose. The hair is scraped and removed from the decomposed hide, after which the hide is dried in the sun using Umbhobe (Milkwood tree). The hide is scrubbed with a brush, creating a suede like texture. It is removed from the sun a day before it is issued to a team that will squash, straighten, soften and dye it. The hide's black colour is achieved by applying a mixture of oil and wood ashes / charcoal. Added to this, fat is rubbed onto isidwaba as the skirt must never be washed. Fat protects it against water. To wash the skirt is equalled to washing away the woman's ancestors and thus her protection from her husband's homestead. Like the isidwaba, the fat is said to guard her against the potential wrath of her husband's ancestors.

== Design of the Isidwaba ==
The isidwaba represents respect for the family of the husband; therefore it must be of knee-length, thereby reducing exposure above the knees. The isidwaba is worn by folding it over the waist and lower limbs up to the knees. The side ends must overlap to ensure that the bride is adequately covered by the isidwaba and that she must not be exposed, even whilst doing the traditional dance. The grass made belt, called isifociya, is tied around the waist to keep the isidwaba in position. Another belt called an impempe is left on the side to hang as decoration.

The predominant dyed colour of the isidwaba is black. The Nazareth Baptist Church (NBC) version of the isidwaba reaches just below the knees and the pleats are broader than the usual isidwaba, as per the picture below:

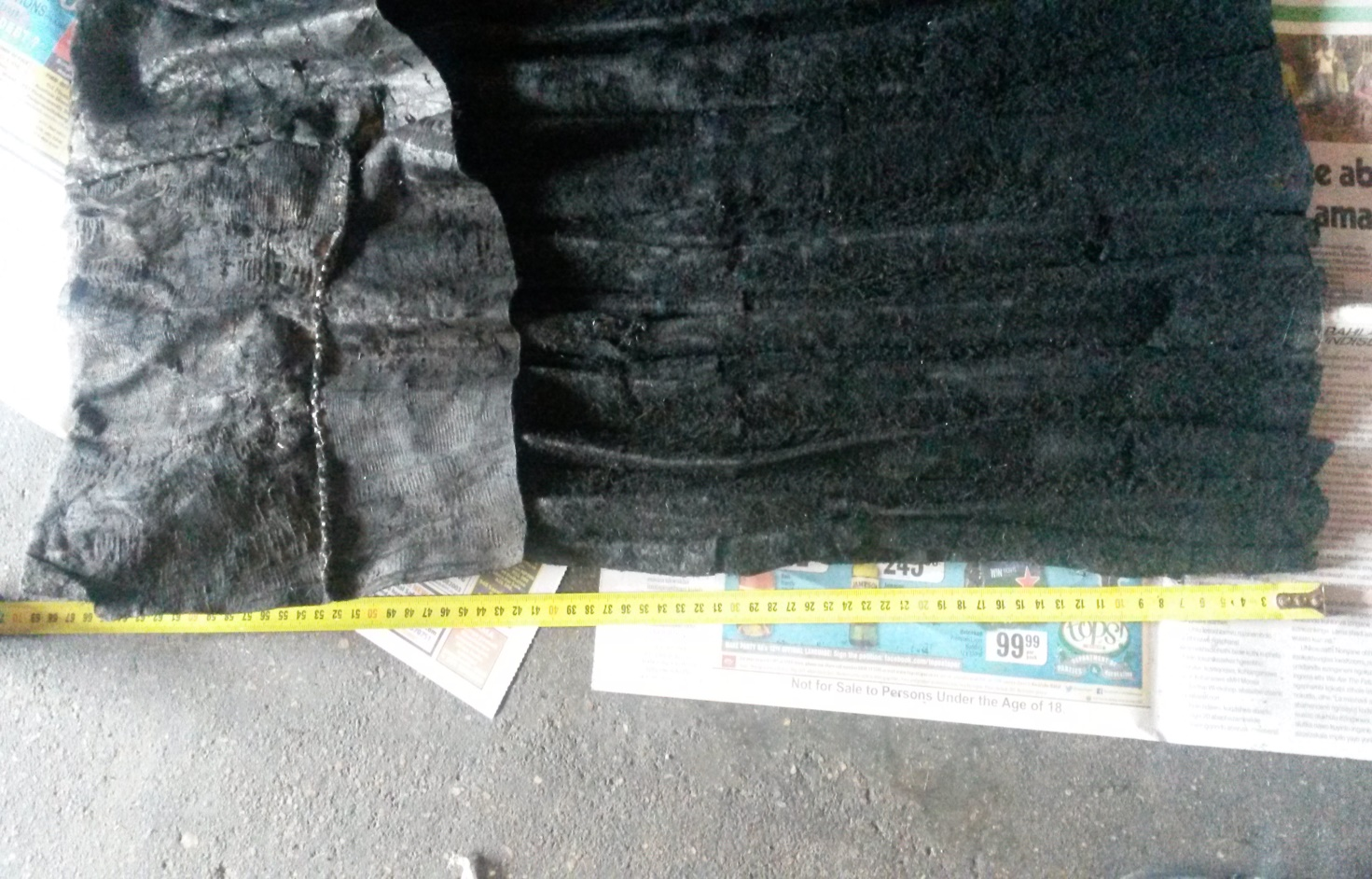
NBC Isidwaba full length

NBC members have a second version of the isidwaba that is natural uncoloured cowhide for daily usage. It is a shorter version that is used by married women as an under garment. The uncoloured isidwaba is worn over a lace garment that is tube-like called itete, which also extends to cover isidwaba on top. The itete is used for protection and hygienic purposes.

== Measurements ==
The isidwaba measures 61 cm in height, prior to the top end being folded to accommodate the belt. The weight is approximately 1.8 kg. It has pleats that are 1 cm to 1.5 cm wide. The NBC's isidwaba has wider pleats measuring 4.5 cm. It measures 100 cm in height and its weight is approximately 2.5 kg. (Please note: the sample was one item of each version and cannot be a generalisable sample)

== Decoration ==
The traditional Zulu leather skirt is decorated with beaded panels in some areas. The Zulu nation is well known for its intricate beadwork, with each colour having a symbolic meaning. The decoration of the beads, designed and patterned in a particular manner, not only expresses certain literal and figurative or poetic meanings, but also shows a fashionable style as a medium of social interaction, status and social display. The isidwaba's progression through fashion can be seen on the various patterns and colour sequences on the belt which holds the isidwaba in place. In a modern-day twist, fashion designer Sindiso Khumalo vibrantly incorporates isidwaba in her Autumn / Winter 2013 collection, titled Umabo

== Symbolism ==
The isidwaba is said to be imbued with ancestral power, as a result their leather skirts do not belong to them but to the ancestors. Izidwaba (plural) are protective ancestral garments perceived as concrete symbols of control over women's fertility. A woman is considered figuratively naked unless she wears her isidwaba. As a result, the women have no choice but to wear their skirts that are also described as 'ancestral blankets' that enfold and protect them. If the women refrain from wearing the skirts it is believed that they will incur illness or, worse, death. This is a transgression that can only be obviated by slaughtering an animal from their agnatic homesteads to appease their husbands' ancestors. It is not the skill employed in the execution of art objects that is valued, but the spiritual powers they invoke through it. As with the isidwaba, it is by pouring or rubbing the substances onto the artefact that these powers are invoked. The object itself is otherwise meaningless. Another symbolic value is that Amadlozi (ancestral spirits) prefer the dark, this being the reason why the isidwaba is blackened. As a result of this dark marriage skirt, the Amadlozi can accompany the bride to her husband's homestead and ensure her fertility. It is further highlighted in literature that migrant men feel secure when their women wear these skirts when they leave for urban areas. It provides a sense of security that their wives are less likely to have an affair with other men in fear of their ancestors. The author further indicates that married women wear the leather skirts at holy events such as marriage and at a sacred dance The isidwaba brings respect to the woman wearing it and becomes a symbol to show that she is "taken". To demonstrate the sacredness centred on this Zulu traditional leather skirt, it is said it can never be thrown away, it is buried.
