= Rwoth Ubimu of Alur =

Title of the king of Alur, Uganda

- Coat of Arms of Alur

Incumbent
- Philip Rauni III since 19 May 2006

Details
- Style: His Majesty
- Formation: 1490
- Residence: Kaal Atyak Palace
- Website: alurkingdom.com

The Rwoth Ubimu (Literally Supreme King in Alur) is the constitutional monarch of the Alur Kingdom, one of the 17 officially recognised traditional kingdoms in Uganda. The Rwoth Ubimu serves as a unifying cultural figure for the Alur people in both Uganda and the Democratic Republic of the Congo. The crown is hereditary, with the current king, Philip Rauni III, inheriting the title from his grandfather Oyoma Jobi II.

== Political power ==
As head of state of the Alur Kingdom the Rwoth Ubimu exercises significant powers over the government of the kingdom. The king appoints the Alur Prime Minister, known as the Jadipu, and the members of the Alur cabinet. Ugandan law however prohibits traditional monarchs from exercising political powers or being involved in politics, as such relegating the kingdoms to cultural and development matters.
