= Jadipu of Alur =

Prime minister of the Alur Kingdom, Uganda

- Coat of arms of Alur

- Flag of Alur
- Incumbent; Lawrence Opar Angala since 30 October 2021
- Style: The Right Honourable
- Appointer: The Rwoth Ubimu
- Term length: At the Rwoth Ubimu's pleasure

The Jadipu is the prime minister of the Alur Kingdom, one of the traditional kingdoms of Uganda. The Jadipu is appointed by and subordinate to the Alur monarch, the Rwoth Ubimu, usually from among close male relatives. As head of government, the Jadipu is an ex officio member of the Alur Parliament. The Jadipu chair's the Alur cabinet of ministers, exercises the day-to-day governance of the kingdom, and acts as a spokesman for the Rwoth Ubimu.
