= Naleyo =

Traditional Ugandan dance

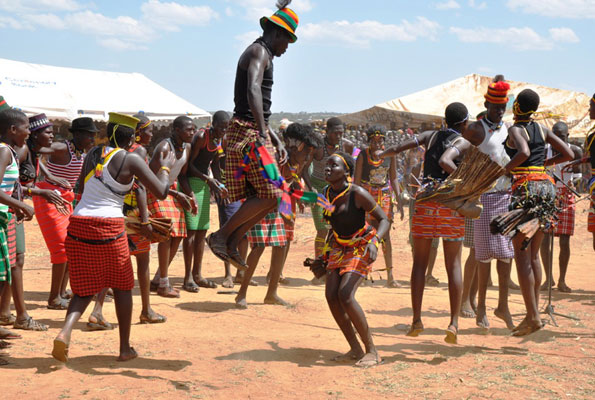
Karimojong Naleyo dance

Naleyo or Naleyo Dance is a traditional dance performed by the Karamajong people of North Eastern Uganda. It is a wooing dance performed in two lines with the women on one line and the men on the other line. The dance is characterized by the way the men and women jump high while facing each other, making it an interesting spectacle to watch.

== History ==
The Karamajong people are an ethnic group in Uganda known for their agro-pastoral herding lifestyle. They speak the NgaKarimojong language, which is part of the Nilotic language family. The Naleyo Dance is a yearly tradition after the harvest season.

== Performance ==
Naleyo Dance is performed in two lines with the women on one line and the men on the other line. The dance is characterized by the way the men and women jump high while facing each other. The men wear traditional attire consisting of a headdress made of animal skin, a skirt made of animal hide, and a belt made of beads. The women wear a skirt made of animal hide and a beaded necklace. The dance is accompanied by traditional music played on a variety of instruments such as the adungu, ngoma, and ekitirikiti.

== Significance ==
Naleyo Dance is a wooing dance where women choose their dancing partners. The dance is performed during the harvest season and is a way for young men and women to find love. The dance is also a way for the Karamajong people to celebrate their culture and heritage.

== See also ==
- Karamojong people
- Courtship dance
- Ngakarimojong language
