= Adumu =

African traditional dance

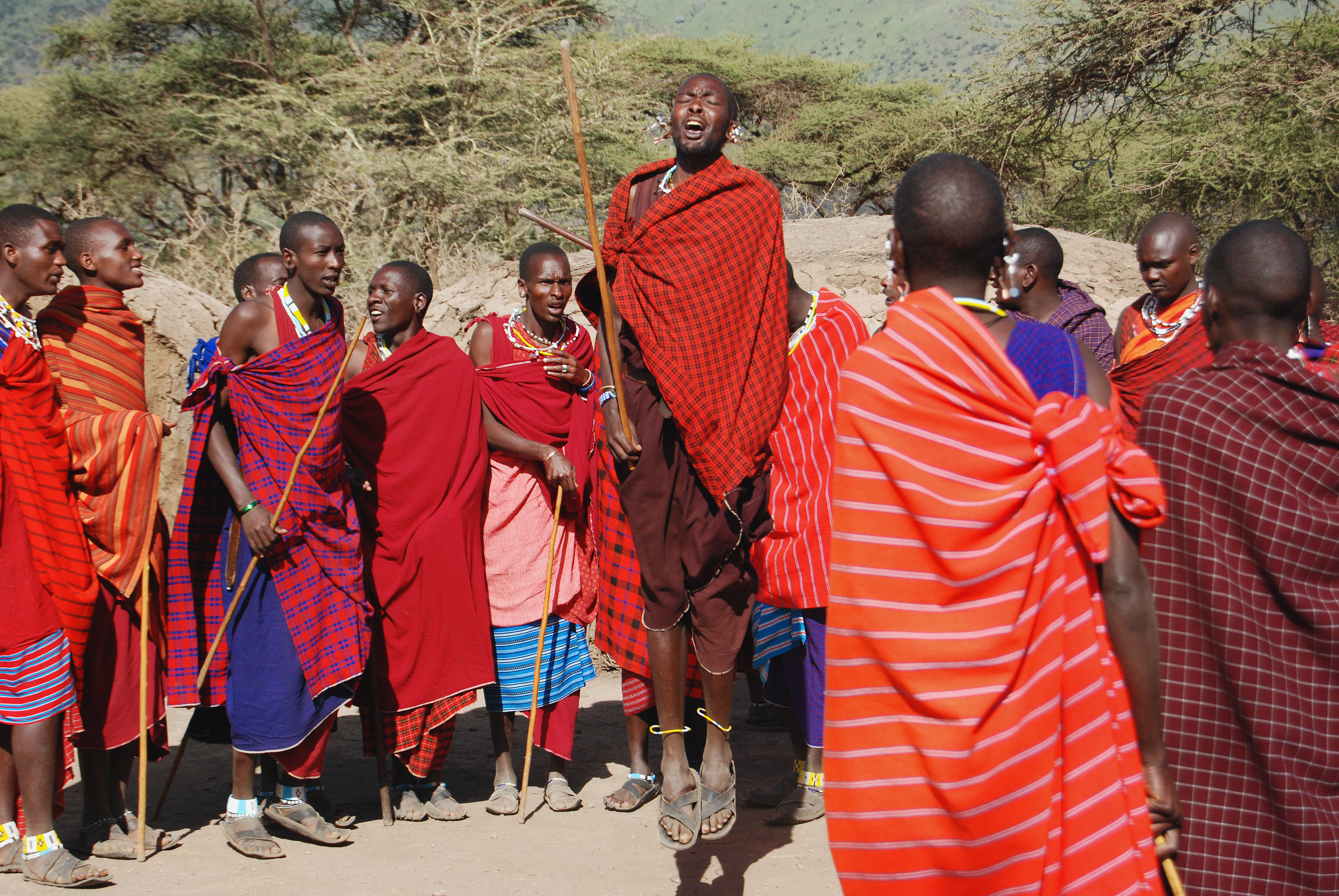
- Warriors performing the traditional Adumu dance / Adumu
- Native name: Enkipaata or Aigus
- Etymology: "to jump up and down."
- Genre: Traditional dance
- Instrument(s): ilmurran, drum, rattles
- Origin: Kenya and Tanzania

Adumu or Enkipaata, also known as the Maasai jumping dance, is a type of dance that the Maasai people of Kenya and Tanzania practice. Young Maasai warriors generally perform the energetic and acrobatic dance at ceremonial occasions including weddings, religious rites, and other significant cultural events.

== History ==
The Maasai people of Kenya and Tanzania have a history and culture that is intricately entwined with that of the Adumu traditional dance. Although the dance's beginnings are unclear, it is thought to have developed as a method for Maasai warriors to train for combat and display their stamina, agility, and power. Maasai history claims that the dance was initially performed by young warriors as a method to hone their leaping and jumping abilities, which were necessary for both hunting and combat. The dance started to be performed at significant cultural occasions including weddings, religious rituals, and other festivals as it evolved into a more organized, ritualized dance.

== Description ==
The Adumu dance is characterized by a sequence of jumps performed by the dancers, who stand in a circle and alternately jump in the air while keeping their bodies as straight and upright as possible. In addition to wearing vividly colored shúkàs (clothes) and beaded jewelry, the dancers are typically clad in traditional Maasai costume. Traditional Maasai songs and chants are also performed during the dance.

The Maasai warriors who perform the Adumu dance are judged on the height of their jumps as well as the grace and dexterity of their moves. The dance is extremely competitive. The warriors' strength, agility, and endurance, as well as their bravery and heroism, are all displayed via their dance.

== Etymology ==
There are a number of different interpretations provided by various sources, therefore the exact origin and etymology of the term "Adumu" are not totally known. The word "Adumu" is thought to have Maasai origins and is thought to be derived from the verb "dumu," which means "to jump" or "to leap." According to this view, the word "Adumu" relates specifically to the jumping and leaping actions that are a key component of the dance. Another idea is that "Adumu" is a shortened version of the Maasai greeting "Aigus," which is occasionally used to signal the start of the dance. According to this view, the dance's name, "Adumu," refers to its ceremonial and ritualistic elements as well as its relationship to Maasai culture and custom.

The dance itself is a significant component of Maasai culture and identity, and its name is well known both within and outside the Maasai community, despite the confusion surrounding the term's etymology.

== Cultural material used ==
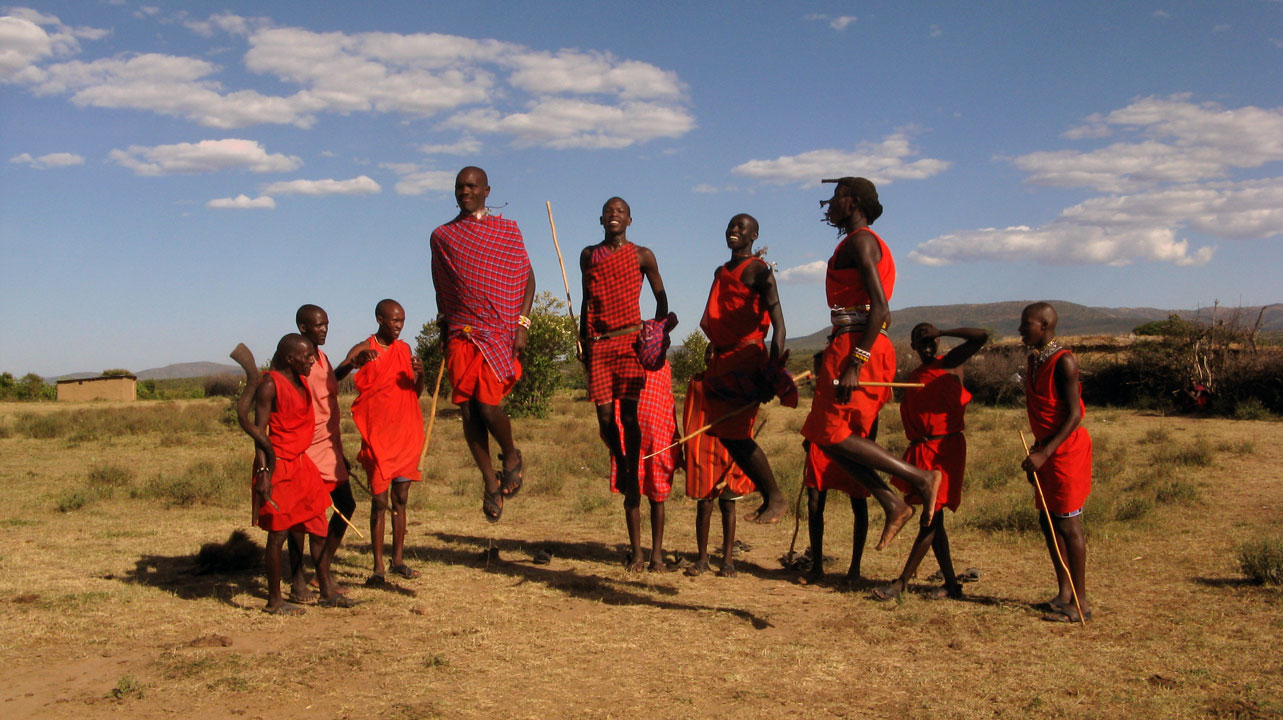
Maasai men performing traditional jumping dance (Adumu)

Adumu is a highly symbolic dance that is performed during ceremonies and incorporates a variety of cultural objects. The Maasai people's culture, history, and significance are all conveyed through these objects, which constitute an essential component of the dance. Traditional Maasai clothing is one of the most important cultural elements used in the Adumu dance. Often, the dancers are covered in colorful cloths called shukas that are wrapped over their bodies in a particular way. Intricate beadwork and other decorations are sometimes applied to these shukas, which are frequently red in color and are said to be a Maasai people symbol.

The Adumu dance features a variety of musical instruments in addition to the attire, such as drums, rattles, and horns. These musical instruments are played by both the dancers and other community members, and they contribute to the dance's rhythmic and melodic accompaniment. Traditional Maasai jewelry is another significant cultural component included in the Adumu dance. Expensive necklaces, bracelets, and earrings made of beads, cowrie shells, and other materials are frequently worn by the dancers. These jewelry items are very symbolic and stand for significant elements of Maasai culture, including money, prestige, and identity. In addition, the dancers carry spears and shields while they execute the Adumu, which involves a variety of traditional gestures and symbols. These emblems serve to remind the community of the bravery and tenacity of their ancestors while also representing the Maasai people's warrior traditions. Ultimately, the Adumu traditional dance reinforces the Maasai people's cultural identity and legacy by incorporating cultural elements. These materials not only look lovely and are ornamental, but they also have profound symbolic importance and communicate significant cultural messages to both the locals and visitors. As a result, they play a crucial role in the dance as well as in Maasai culture as a whole.

== Conclusion ==
The Adumu dance is a traditional Maasai dance that is extremely exuberant and acrobatic. The young Maasai warriors who perform it on important occasions are known for their jumps and chanting. Although the dance has received criticism lately, many Maasai people still regard it as a significant aspect of their traditional legacy.
