= Ukusina =

African Traditional dance

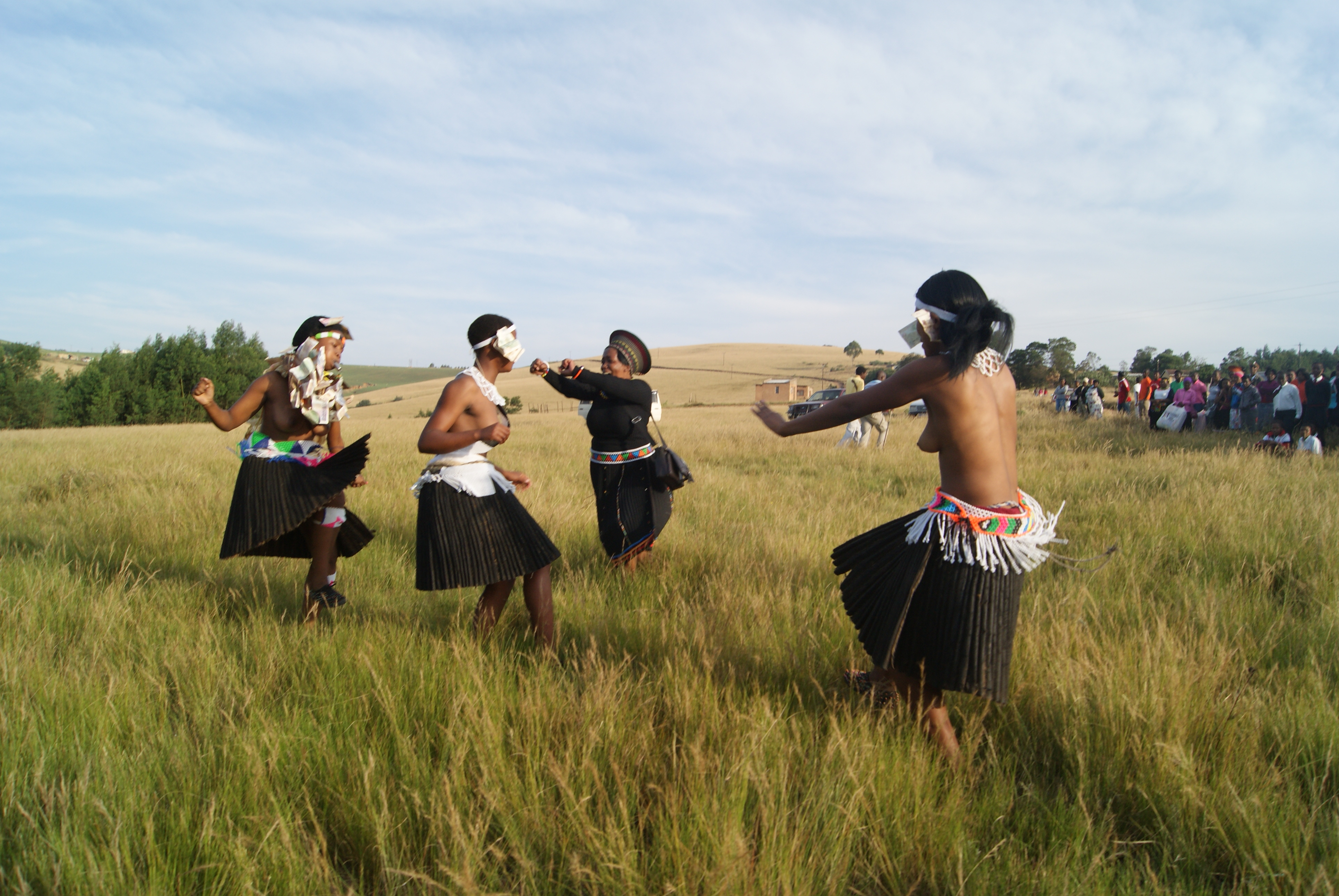
- People from Zulu performing Ukusina
- Etymology: dance of the spirits
- Genre: Traditional dance
- Instrument(s): Drum, beads, animal skin, whistle
- Inventor: Zulu people
- Origin: South Africa

Ukusina is a traditional dance that has its roots in South Africa's coastal region. For the Zulu people, it is an expressive and rhythmic ritual with deep cultural importance. Ukusina dancers kick their legs in any direction up and out, and then stamp each foot into the ground. The majority of the time, this dance is performed for entertainment during social occasions such as wedding ceremony. Each Ukusina performance is socially created and centers on the song leader singing interlocking word phrases. Traditionally, it was thought that no religious event would be complete without at least one Ukusina performance. Ukusina is a fundamental component of the social, religious, and cultural life of the Zulu people. Everyone in attendance is drawn into a coherent action atmosphere by the intimate relationship between body movement and music.

== Etymology ==
Ukusina is a Zulu word, which combines the verb sina ("to dance") with the prefix uku-, which signifies that the action, in this case, dancing, is being performed or is in the process of being performed.

== History ==
The Zulu people, one of the largest ethnic groups in South Africa, have a significant influence on the history of Ukusina dance. The dance has been passed down mostly through oral traditions, and the specifics of its origins are not well-documented.

Ukusina has been preserved and promoted to ensure its survival in the face of modernization and cultural changes. It is performed during cultural celebrations and events like the Zulu Reed Dance, and several dance groups and cultural institutions committed to upholding Zulu customs have performed and taught Ukusina. These programs are designed to guarantee the dance form's survival and increased popularity, both domestically and internationally.

== Dance movements and techniques ==
A variety of moves and techniques are used in Ukusina, which is performed with tremendous dexterity and vigor. The induna, a competent dancer who sets the pace and directs the other dancers, usually leads the dance. The motions used in Ukusina are frequently symbolic and depict different facets of daily life and Zulu culture. They involve footwork, powerful kicks, hops, and deft hand movements. The dancers frequently move in line or circular patterns while keeping time with the music and rhythm. The dancers exhibit agility, strength, and grace throughout their performance, which is distinguished by their dynamic and energetic nature. The dance's basis is laid by the rhythmic beat of traditional Zulu drums, which is complemented by other percussion instruments.

== Attire ==
The performance and aesthetics of Ukusina incorporate cultural sources. Long-standing customs among the Zulu people call for the incorporation of particular materials of symbolic and cultural significance into their dancing costumes and accessories.

Beads are worn by dancers during Ukusina performances. Zulu culture has a strong emphasis on beads, which are also seen frequently in dance. The dancers' costumes, headdresses, necklaces, bracelets, and anklets are all embellished with intricate beadwork. Bright colors, elaborate patterns, and symbolic designs that reflect Zulu tradition and convey particular meanings are frequently used in the beadwork. Dancers wear skirts, aprons, and other clothing made from animal skins, such as those of cows and goats. Beadwork and other embellishments are frequently used to decorate animal skins. In Zulu culture, feathers are also used in dance costumes and have spiritual and symbolic significance. They are employed in headpieces, armbands, anklets, and other accessories. Feathers are thought to link dancers to ancestor spirits, requesting their blessings and presence during the performance. Men may wear ibheshu, a long woven skirt, or isikhakha, a skirt made of animal skin. Isidwaba, a wraparound skirt, is acceptable for women.

== Cultural significance ==
For the Zulu people, Ukusina has great cultural and spiritual significance. It is performed during significant festivals, ceremonies, and rites of passage, such as weddings, memorial services, and coming-of-age ceremonies. The dance is thought to be a way for living people to communicate with their ancestors and ask for their blessings and protection. The energetic, rhythmic motions of the dance are complemented by singing and music from the Zulu culture. The dancers frequently don vibrant clothing covered with elaborate beadwork, feathers, and other ornamental details as a representation of their cultural identity and heritage.

== Preservation and contemporary relevance ==
Despite modernization and cultural changes, Ukusina remains an important aspect of Zulu cultural identity. Efforts have been made both within South Africa and globally to conserve and promote this ancient dancing form. Several cultural festivals, including the Zulu Reed Dance, feature Ukusina Dance, allowing the younger generation to learn about and respect their cultural history. Furthermore, dance troupes and cultural groups dedicated to preserving Zulu traditions frequently include Ukusina in their repertoire, assuring its longevity. Ukusina has earned international fame and appeal.
