= Umemulo =

Zulu ceremony for young women

Umemulo is a traditional Zulu coming of age ceremony for women. This ritual is normally done for females at the age of 21, but it can be done at any stage of a woman's life. It varies and depends on circumstances. The rituals involve slaughtering a cow and the traditional Zulu dance Ukusina involving a spear and guests gifting the young female with money and other blessings. A woman's Umemulo ceremony signifies that she is now ready for marriage. The girl is supposed to stay 7 Days in the Rondovel with her friends and practice songs for the ceremony. On the 7th day, the girls wake up early in the morning and go to the nearest river to bathe. When they come back, the girl is presented with a spear and she wears the fat from a cow's stomach (Umhlwehlwe) and they sing the traditional songs and dance and people present Gifts and pin money on the girl as a gift. the girl in that household who has had umemulo needs to find a husband and have children when she thinks the time is right.

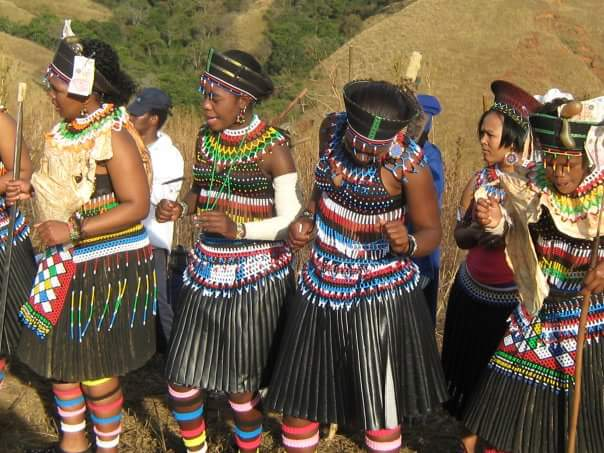
Umemulo Dance

== Bibliography ==
- Richman Thulani Blose, Transformation and Continuity in the Umemulo Ceremony, University of Natal, 1998
- Mzo Sirayi, South African Drama and Theatre from Pre-Colonial Times to the 1990S, Xlibris Corp., 2012
- Aryan Singh Ritual Traditions in the Zulu culture@ New Forest High School, 2021
