= Otole dance =

Traditional dance performed by the Acholi in Uganda

The Otole is a traditional war dance of the Acholi people of Northern Uganda. It historically served both as a form of pre-combat training and cultural expression, educating young generations about warfare and community defense through performance. Participants historically consisted of physically strong men and selected women, typically between the ages of 30 and 50.

== Purposes ==
The Otole served a number of purposes, including:

- Physical preparation. It involves vigorous movement and mock combat helped condition warriors for physical demands and real warfare.
- Practicing attack formations and strategies.
- Emotional and psychological preparation
- . Through ritualized songs, chanting and stimulated fighting, participants were encouraged to developed courage and resolve
- Raising public support for proposed combat
- Community mobilization. Public performance of the dance helped galvanize communal support for implementing conflict to commemorate victories.

== Description ==
The Otole was organized at the call of a chief and included mock battles, stimulated attack and retreat movements and victory dances. The dance included victory dances and fake fights. During the Otole, men wear leopard skins and ostrich feathers, and carry horns, shields, and spears. Women carry small wooden axes or unsharpened sticks.

A lead woman singer initiates the dance with kigila, or ululations, and the lead man begins the owoc, or mock fight. The Otole is accompanied by drums, and participants sing or yell war songs.

During the dance, women for a procession that it flanked by men, symbolizing male responsibility to protect women and community.

== Cultural significance ==
- While rooted in martial preparations, the otole dance also carried social and symbolic meaning.Through dramatized combat and song, it reinforced gender roles, courage and collective identity among the Acholi. It also acted as a form of oral history, transmitting martial traditions from elders to younger generation.
- In contemporary times, elements of the Otole dance are sometimes performed at cultural festivals celebrating Acholi heritage, where elders execute traditional moves with spears and shields to evoke historical memory and community pride.

== Contemporary practice ==
Although the traditional martial functions of the Otole have largely faded with changes in social organization and governance, the dance persists as part of cultural demonstrations and heritage events. It is often featured alongside other Acholi dances such as Bwola(royal dance) and larakaraka( courtship dance) in cultural showcases.

== See also ==
- Larakaraka
- Dingidingi
