= Alur people =

Alur
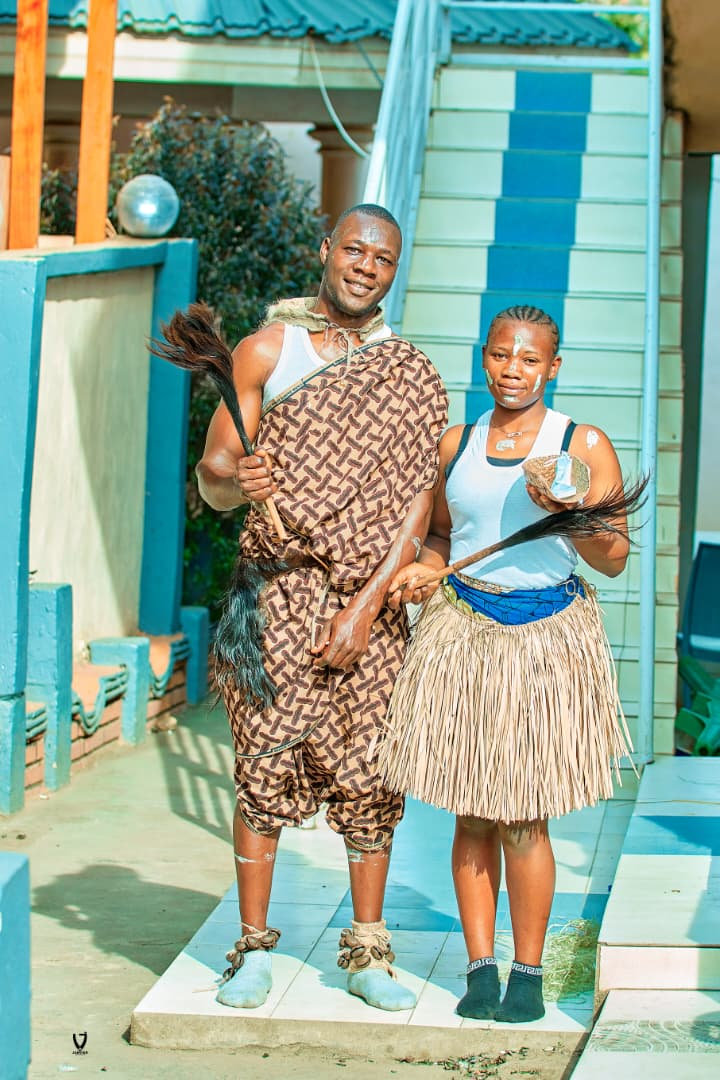

Total population
- 2,550,000

Regions with significant populations
- Uganda: 1,152,858 (2024)
- Democratic Republic of the Congo: 1,905,040 (2009)

Languages
- Native; Alur; Also; French (in DRC), English (in Uganda)

Religion
- Predominantly:Christianity (97%),Minority: Islam (3%)

Related ethnic groups
- Other Luo peoples, especially Adhola and Luos

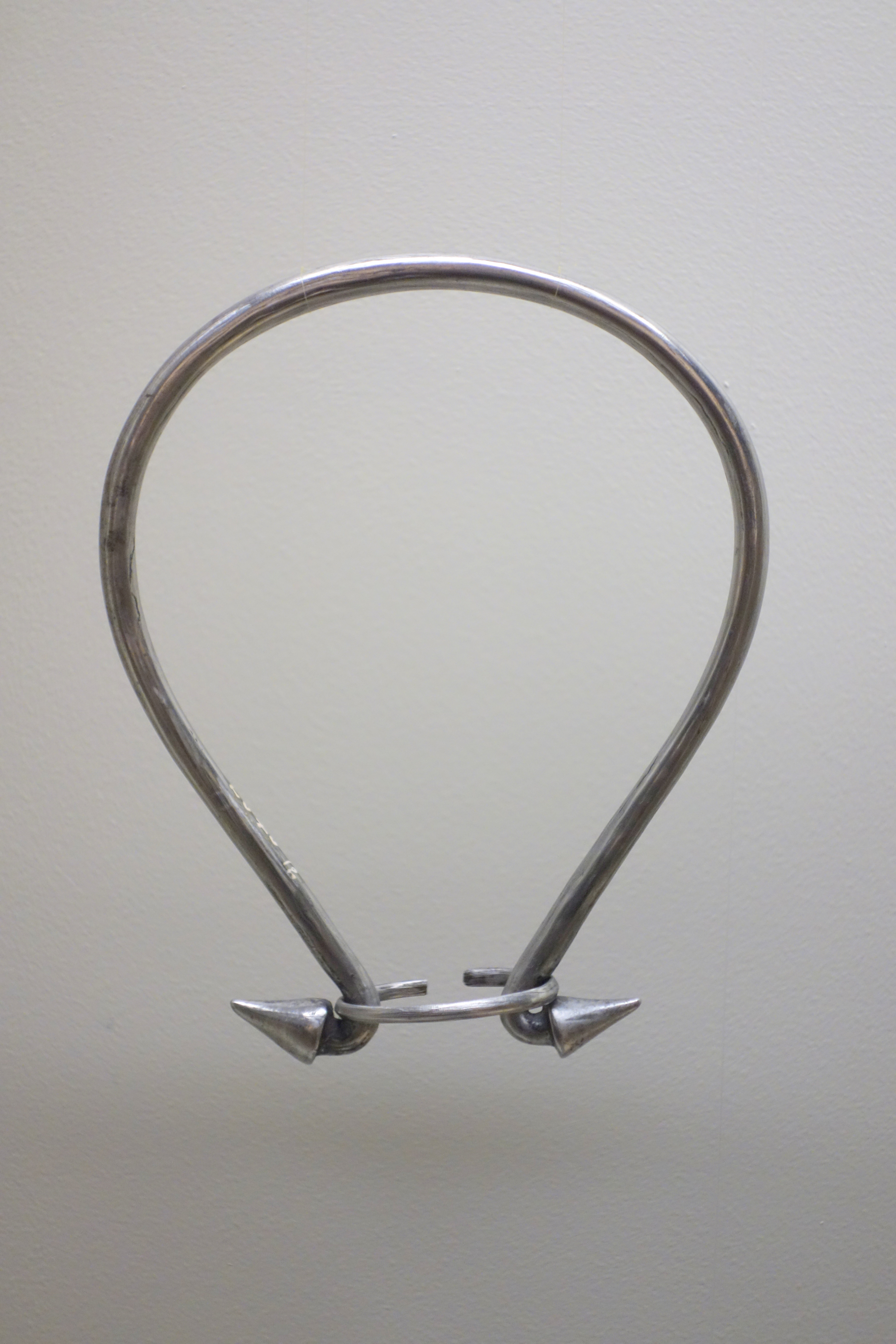
Alur necklace

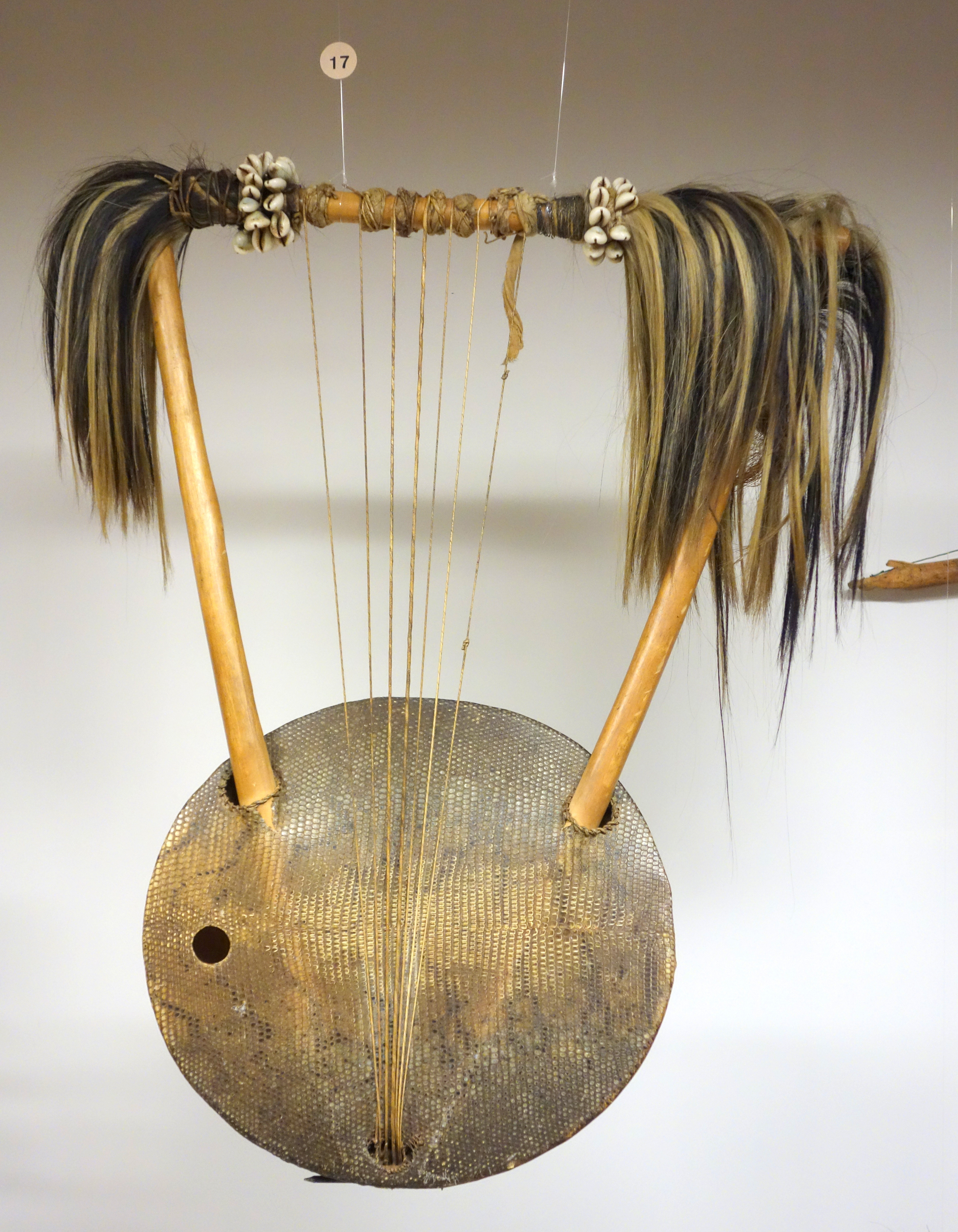
Alur lyre

Alur are a Nilotic ethnic group who live in northwestern Uganda and northeastern Democratic Republic of the Congo (DRC). They are part of the larger Luo group.

In Uganda, they live mainly in the Nebbi, Zombo, Pakwach and Arua districts. In the DRC, they reside in Mahagi territory, mostly north of Lake Albert. There were around 800,000 members of the Alur in Uganda in 2014, and two million Alur living in the DRC in 2009. Members of the Alur diaspora span the globe.

The current Rwoth Ubimu (In English, "Supreme King") of the Alur Kingdom is Rwoth Ubimu Phillip Rauni III.

== Language ==
Most Alur speak the Alur language or other Luo languages. Some also speak Lendu, Kebu, and Lugbara. Alur language dialects vary considerably. The highland Alur (Okoro) speak a slightly different dialect from the lowland Alur (Jonam), and it might be difficult to for a native highland Alur person to properly understand their lowland kinsman.

== Chiefdoms ==
The Alur Kingdom, also known as "Ker Alur," is thought to be the only kingdom that was not affected by the 1966 Ugandan ban on traditional monarchies.

All Alur Kings are referred to as "Rwoth", just like all Luo Chiefs and Kings, and they are crowned according to the royal spear head bearing tradition. The title "Ubimu" is used to refer to the King as distinguished from other chiefs in the Kingdom.

The 33rd and current king, Rwoth Ubimu Phillip Rauni Olarker III, was crowned in 2010 and has his capital at Kaal Atyak Winam, Zombo district, Uganda. He is currently committed to reconnecting the people of the Alur Kingdom both within the kingdom and in the diaspora, with the goals including economic growth and social protection for girls and women and ending child marriage. In recent years the king has organised cultural sports tournaments to bring together the community; both men and women participate in these activities.

One of the king's closest male relatives is the Prime Minister, second to the king. The current Prime Minister is Prince Lawrence Opar Angala the Jadipu. The current Queen Mother, Rotzette Keronega, is also a very influential political figure.

The Alur Kingdom currently has 64 chiefdoms, eight of which are located in the DRC and 56 in Uganda. When the Europeans first arrived, the Alur people were organised in a number of chiefdoms, mainly namely: Angal, Juganda, Jukoth, Musongwa, Panyimur, Ragem, Ruvinga, Mukambo, War, Palara, Panduru, Ukuru, Paidha, Padea, Panyikang'o, Mambisa among others.

As of February 2026, other kings include Rwoth Fauste Rwothnga Ugwaro Nyipir III (War-Palara), Rwoth Ukethwengu Arnold (PaNduru), Rwoth Emille Kamanda (Angal) and Rwoth Okia Songa III (Alur Djuganda). In 2020, the king in Angal was Rwoth Djalaure Serge II. He took over from his late father Kamanda who died in 1998.

== Location ==
In the DRC, Alur are densely concentrated in 5,216 square kilometres (2,014 sq mi) of Mahagi.

== History ==
The largest and oldest Alur chiefdom was the Ukuru Chiefdom, who counted 10,000 adult men among their ranks in 1914, although Alur counted boys as young as 14 years as men.

The Ukuru chiefdom as a distinct entity was founded in 1630 as a continuation of the then undivided Atyak Kingdom at the accession of Ngira, a member of the Atyak clan, as King when in their migration they left the plains of present-day Nebbi and arrived in the highlands of present-day Zombo District in Uganda and Ituri in Congo. They took over the territory from the indigenous Bantu and Sudanic inhabitants. The region was quickly Alur-ised.

The descendants of the original Bantu men now form the Abira family. Bantu maternal ancestry is very common in Ukuru. The Ukuru chiefdom grew in competition with its other tributary chiefdoms including Paidha and PaNduru. Some other clans were completely taken over providing the Ukuru clan with more food resources, women, and men to defend their territory.

The Chiefdom of Paidha was formed by Magwar, the brother to Ngira and son to Omyer Dhyang, when the non-Luo peoples there kidnapped him in typical Alur royal fashion so as for them to have a royal chief in their midst and thereby be saved from the tyranny of their then ruler. This led to the then King of the Alur, Omyer Dhyang to allow his son the independence to take care of his new subjects, and his remarks to the kidnap of his son led to the nomenclature of the chiefdom, Paidha which is a corruption of the term, "Payudha" meaning "the clan of the snatchers" stemming from the snatching of his son.

The PaNduru chiefdom was formed by Nduru, the half brother to Omyer Dhyang and Paternal Uncle to Ngira and Magwar over a dispute where Nduru initially left with his two uterine brothers that are the ancestors of the lineages of Pagei and PaMinya although the Pagei clan later returned to Ukuru. This explains the prevalence of the said clans in the different chiefdoms. The unfriendly separation between Ukuru and PaNduru however led to a centuries-old sibling rivalry that often flared up and mellowed out depending on the prevailing situations.

In 1789 Ukuru defeated the PaNduru thereby cementing itself as the most powerful Alur chiefdom. For years Ukuru was the most powerful, populous, and largest of the Alur chiefdoms. The same year, a leadership conflict between the brother-kings of the Atyak-Winam and PaNduru clans led to the killing of Alworonga of Atyak, which initiated a war for territory between the clans that lasted until 1902, when Belgian and British colonists took the land for themselves, splitting the clans between modern-day Uganda and the DR Congo. Reconciliation efforts were started under Rwoth Ubimu Valente Keruyoma, but halted due to his death in 2000. A ritual to officially lay the conflict to rest was undertaken by the Atyak-Winam and PaNduru chiefs in October 2012.

== Politics and tribal life ==
For generations the Atyak family has provided for the Chief. Alur society was strictly hierarchical. There were multiple social ranks within each gender.

Social rank depended on a lot of things – assertiveness, number of friends and family (allies), performance on male prestige tasks (war, patrols, hunting, and fishing). Rank is, in theory, not inheritable. However a man with a high-ranking father had, as a rule, more brothers, cousins, and family and was better able to attract allies. But overall, every man had the opportunity to reach a high status with the right mix of qualities.

Alur clans are, in fact, a number of patrilineages living together. These patrilineages can include large numbers of men, all descendants of the same man. The Parombo family (patrilineage) in the Ukuru clan, for example, included 2000 men in 1949. These patrilineages are not strictly fictional. The Alur are very serious about it and maintain a family tree. Of course, a certain level of flexibility has occurred but overall we can trust the picture the Alur paint of their patrilineages. Other prominent clans allover Alur country include the Palei clan, Patek Puduk clan, Pakia clan, Ukuru clan, Anyola clan and the Juloka clan. These are the ones that are closest to the King in Atyak. Others with very important ritual significance but are not necessarily close in Atyak include Pagei, Panywer, Parombo, Pangieth, Padere, Panyonga among others. All these constitute the ancient purely Luo commoner clans, although some are of royal origin.

High rank confers had many advantages in Alur society. Expecting respect and admiration, high-ranking men had first choice in food, especially prestige food like meat and beer. High-ranking men typically had a large number of cattle and since the Alur paid the bride price in cattle high-ranking men had the most wives and thus children. The chief typically had the most children of any man in the clan. High-ranking men had three or more wives, average men two and low-ranking men typically one. As always there was flexibility since low-ranking men could be very successful in tending cattle and thus in acquiring wives but then their rank typically rose.

Men always stayed in the clan they were born in, but women married men from other clans and moved to their husband's clan. Very few women married men from their own clan, since the Alur had very strict rules about avoiding incest. Every man in ones patrilineage was un-marriageable no matter how distant the common ancestor was. Only a specific request from a man from her own clan could let an Alur woman remain within her clan.

== Traditions ==
Among many other traditions of the Alur, the Agwara dance is a notable example. It is a royal dance that is only performed in the presence of the king during community rituals or festivals, and is performed by both men and women.

== Day-to-day life ==
Traditionally, the Alur live in grass-thatched huts. The homesteads in Alur clans are in the central part of their territory. This helps keeps the territory under their control. The Alur were farmer-herders. The Alur grew (and grow) millet, cassava, maize, sweet potatoes, spinach, and pumpkins. They herded cattle, goats, and chickens. Goat and chicken were important sources of meat. Other important resources were salt, forest and wild animals all who were protected from other clans. In the drought season fishing was important. The large herds of animals the Alur typically hunt as secondary sources of meat so as not to exhaust their own goat and chicken numbers moved away to greener pastures.

In Alur society, men herded the domestic animals, grew the crops, built the huts, hunted, fished, and dominated political life. The women were responsible for keeping house, rearing the children and cooking. Many of the men's jobs are bound to strict times (they hunted in large groups just once a month for example). The sexes are segregated by the Alur, with husbands and wives having separate huts, with the men sleeping apart from the women and the children. They also eat separately.

Women and men rarely mix socially. This behavior is not enforced by the men, but it is said that is in the woman's best interest to minimize contact with men. This is done out of fear of aggression and the husband's jealousy. Generally, Alur men are very close and social with men from their own clan. They hunt, farm, fish, go to war, herd, and form coalitions against rivals together. Since Alur men stay in the clan they are born in, and women move to the clan of their husband, the men are typically more social, have more friends, and a wider social network. This is a very important factor in male dominance within the Alur.

== Famous Alur people ==
- Chief Amula (1871–1942)

Amula was born in the Atyak patrilineage as the son of Alworunga and Acroama. Abok Ucweda had an insignificant period in the politics of the Ukuru clan. The same couldn't be said for some of his sons. Ugena had been chief for five years (1845–1850) before being deposed with help from his half-brother Nziri, Amula's paternal grandfather. Amula's father Alworunga had been known to be the best warrior of the Ukuru clan. Three brothers of Alworunga: Amatho, Kubi and Avur also managed to become powerful, respected chiefs with their own chieflet areas in Ukuru. Four of Amula's own brothers, including his full brother Aryem, also became powerful. Amula grew up in the renewed 1878 Ukuru-Panduru war which the Ukuru lost and in which around 600 Ukuru men died in a few days of intense fighting. Amula's father Alworunga was burned alive by Panduru forces led by their chief, Ujuru. Amula grew up to be a powerful man who rapidly rose in the social hierarchy from the age of 15. In 1890, at 19 years old, he was elected as the chief of the Ukuru. He immediately began a war with the Panduru clan and managed to avenge his father's death. Afterward, he strengthened his hold on Ukuru by entering into allegiances with other powerful patrilineages mainly with the Palei, Parombo and sections of the Patek patrilineage. He also could count on the support of many individual men. Amula proved to be a good chief, strong willed but compassionate. He was skillful in wars partly because of his ability to secure alliances with other clans. He was the voice of reason when the British arrived in 1914, compelling the people not to fight them. He was exiled by the British in 1917 for not rigidly following their orders but was allowed back in 1922. He died in 1942, still very popular and loved. As a chief, Amula had many wives and children. His son Jalusiga (1896–1978) succeeded him as chief although this was a British doing and not a choice of the clan. Another son of his, Jalaure (born in 1888), acted as chief in his absence from 1917 to 1922.

== See also ==
- Aringa
- Acholi
- Karamojong
- Gisu
