= Larakaraka =

Acholi traditional courtship dance

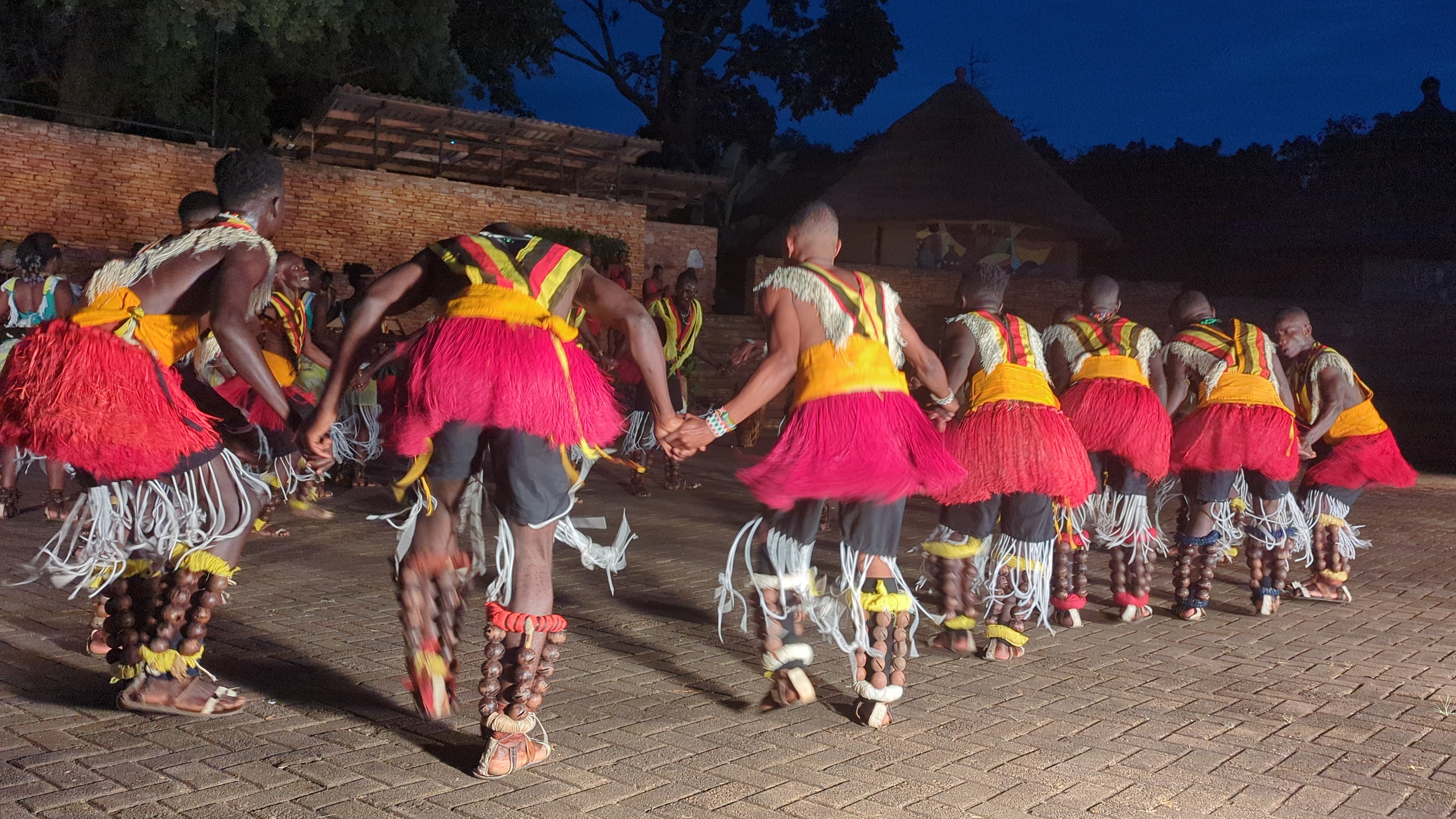
Larakaraka Dance Performance at Ndere Centre

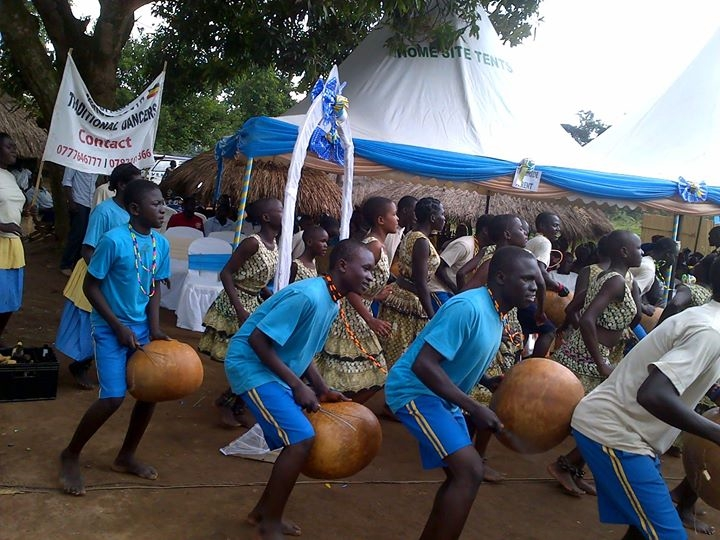
Larakaraka dance performance

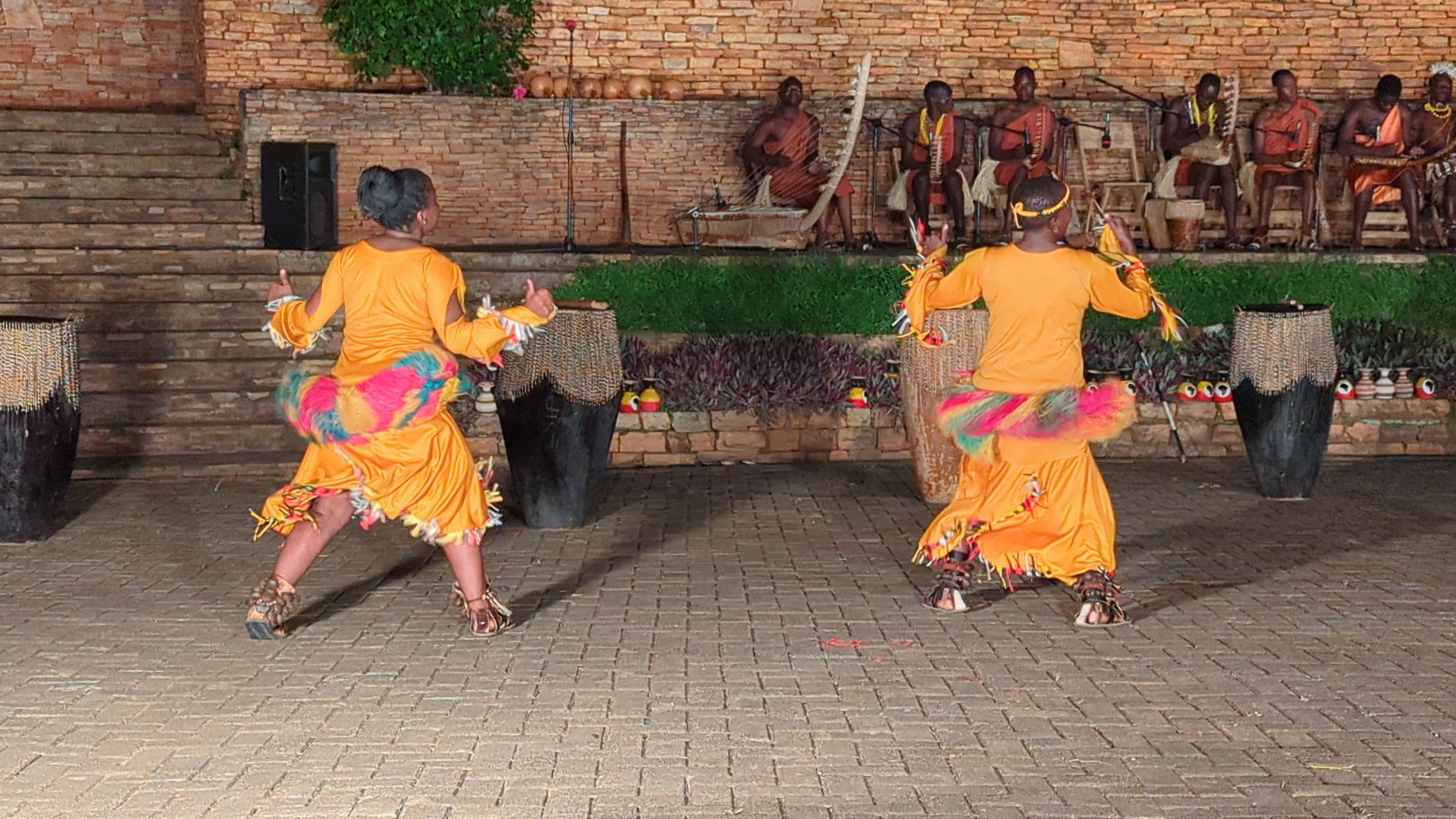
Women dancing Lakaraka dance

Larakaraka is a traditional courtship dance that originated from the Acholi people of Uganda. This dance, among the more than 50 Acholi dances, holds significant importance and is typically performed on special occasions, particularly weddings and communal festivities. Serving as a romantic display of artistry and physical prowess, vibrant display of dance skill, and cultural expression. Larakaraka enables young men to exhibit their dancing skills, vitality, and agility, all with the intention of attracting a potential life partner.

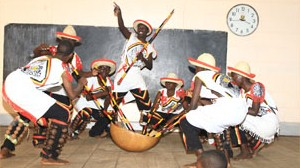
Traditional Dance for Ankole

== Performance ==
Larakaraka is a traditional Acholi performance showcasing the dance abilities of young men and women in the hopes of finding romantic partners or potential spouses. The dance is characterized by dynamic movements and acrobatics, with dancers often executing jumps, spins and graceful motions in mid-air. Accompanied by traditional Acholi music played on drums, harps, flutes, calabashes and other native instruments, this vibrant and creates a display of talent and shows that culture is a significant part of the Acholi heritage.

== Significance ==
Larakaraka holds great significance in Acholi culture and is widely regarded as a traditional rite of passage for both young men and women. In the past, this dance was considered an opportunity for unmarried people to meet, interact, and attract potential life partners through display of endurance and strength. These qualities were looked at as desirable qualities for prospective spouses, and the bravery in the dance was culturally associated with personal and social worth.

=== See also ===
- Rwot Acana
- Otole dance
- Gulu
- Bwola (Acholi royal dance)
