= Agwara (dance) =

Dance of the Alur people of Uganda

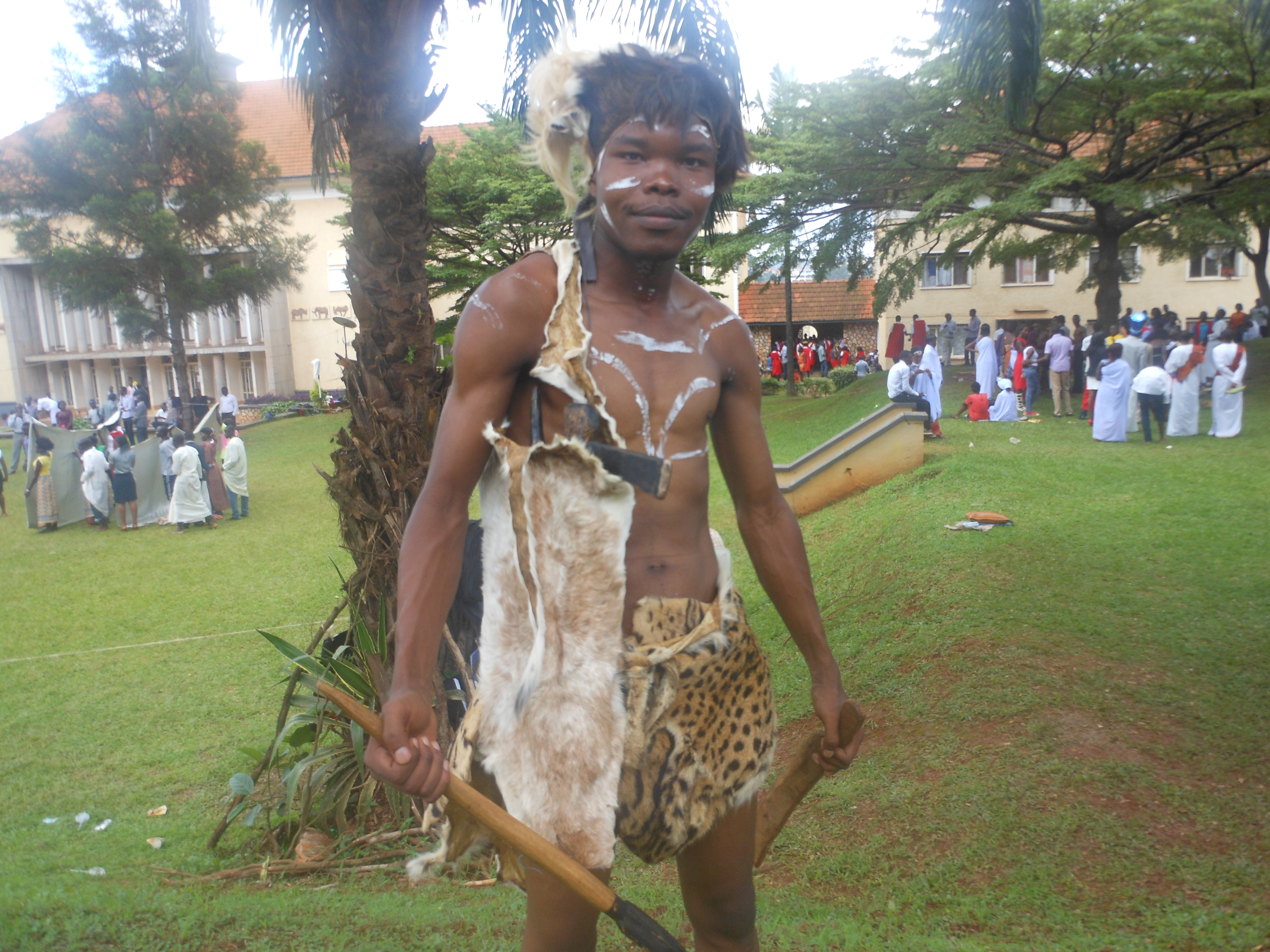
Alur man in traditional Alur cultural wear.

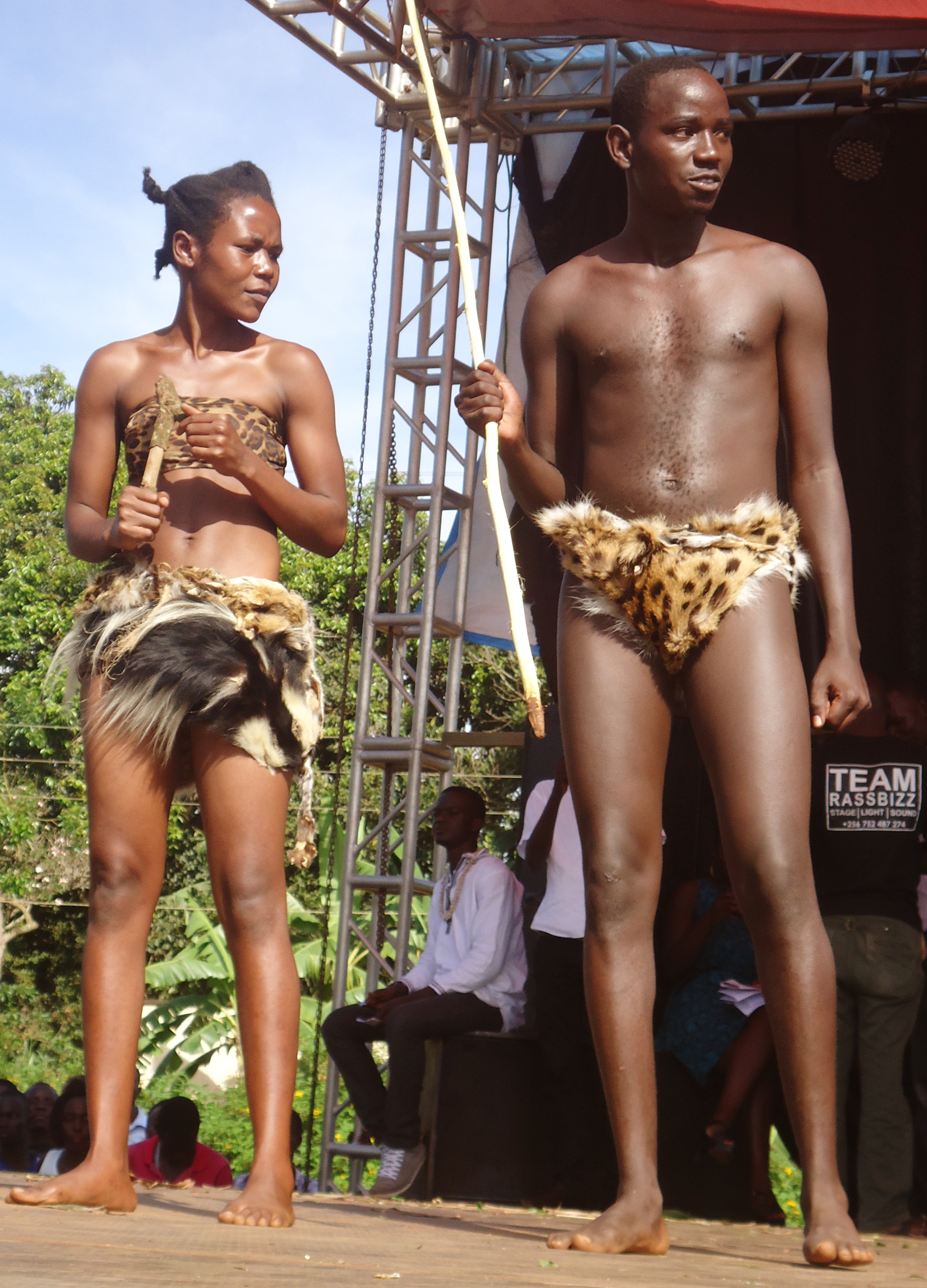
Alur people performing their dance

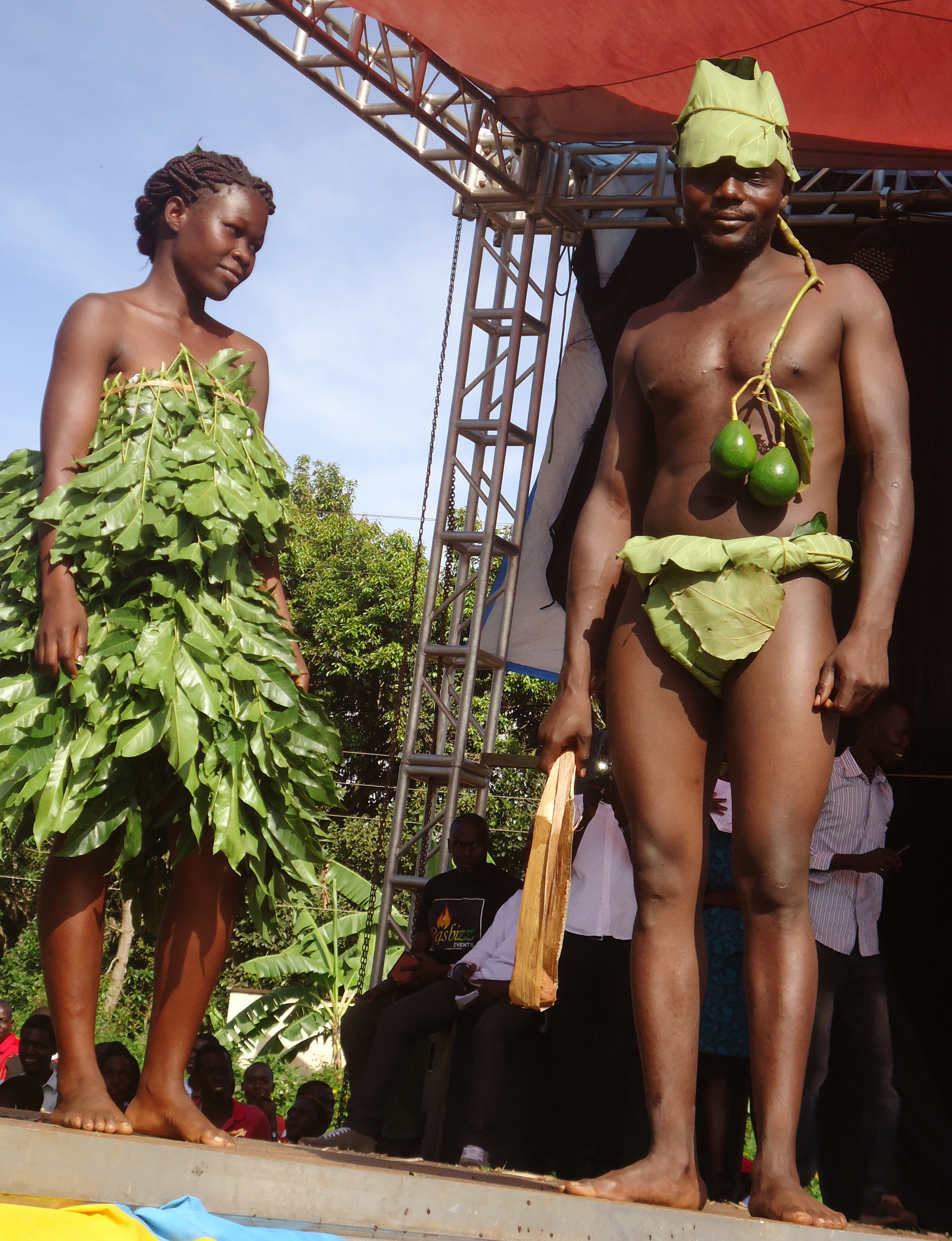
Alur people on stage performing Agwara dance

Agwara is a royal dance of the Alur people of Northern Uganda and parts of the WestNile sub-region, performed in the presence of the king (Rwot). It is performed by both women and men during social occasions. The dance is performed to drums, and uses linear and circular formations characterized by leg and waist twisting while wearing ankle bells to emphasize their footwork. The dance is named after the sound of long trumpets also known as agwara horns. The dance evolved during the process of Alur people mixing and smearing mud on their houses from which its movements later grown in to formal dance expression.

== Performance ==
In the past, Agwara was performed at rituals organized by communities in order to worship or appease the gods, in order to ask for a good harvest before sowing, at the occasion of midsummer or midwinter festival, or just on the occasion of entering a new lunar phase or if there was need of rain. Additionally, there are two types of agwara, "Kwaya" or "Mbaka" which are danced for two days especially for clan competitions and royal celebrations, and "Selewa" which is ordinarily for thanksgiving for good fortune such as successful harvests and communal success.

== See also ==
- Buganda People
- Samia Tribe
- Gisu People
- Alur people
- Music of Uganda
- Cultural heritage of Uganda
- Traditional dances of Uganda
