= Bwola =

Traditional dance of the Acholi people

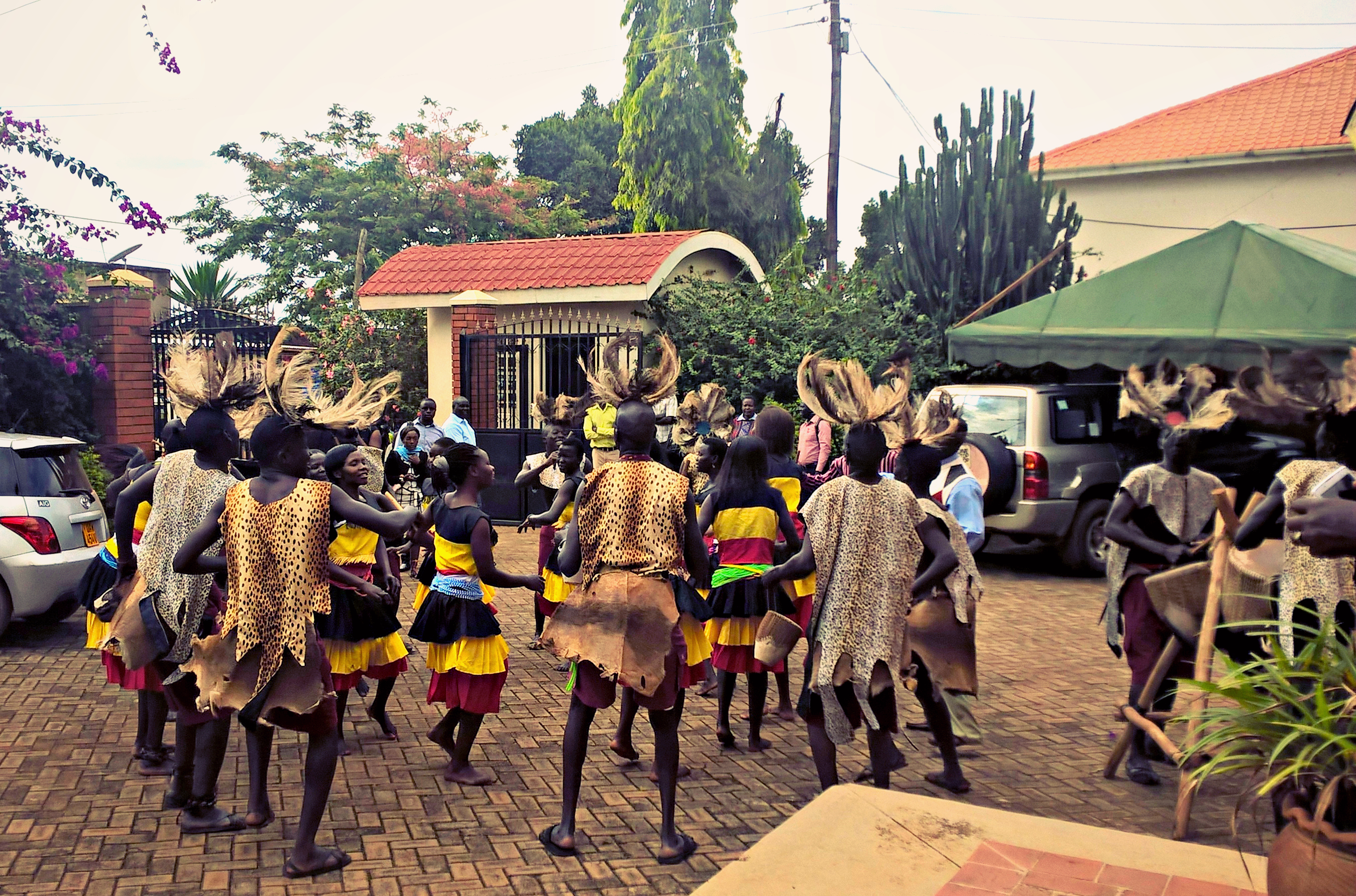
Acholi Bwola Dance

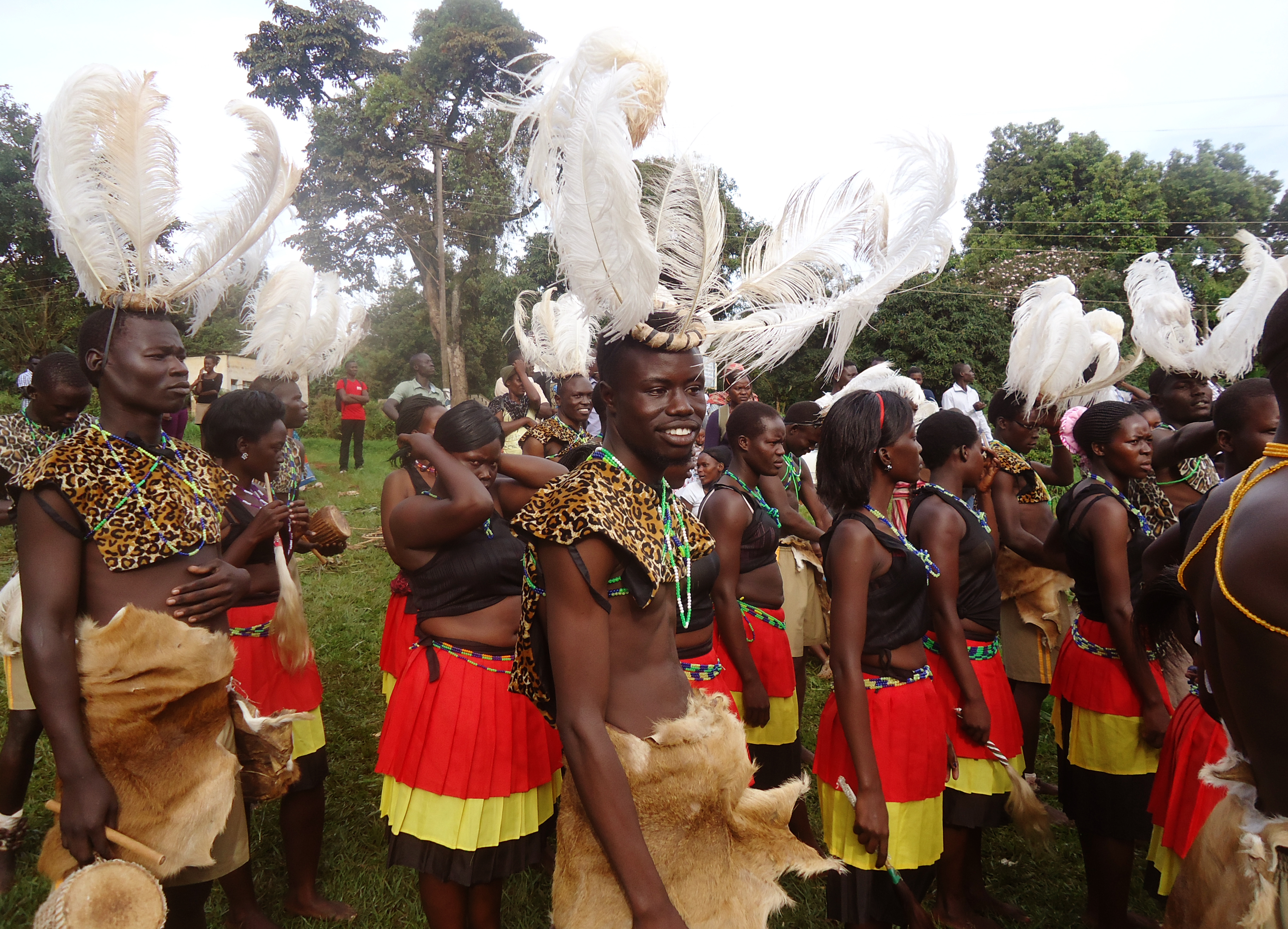
Bwola dance by the Acholi

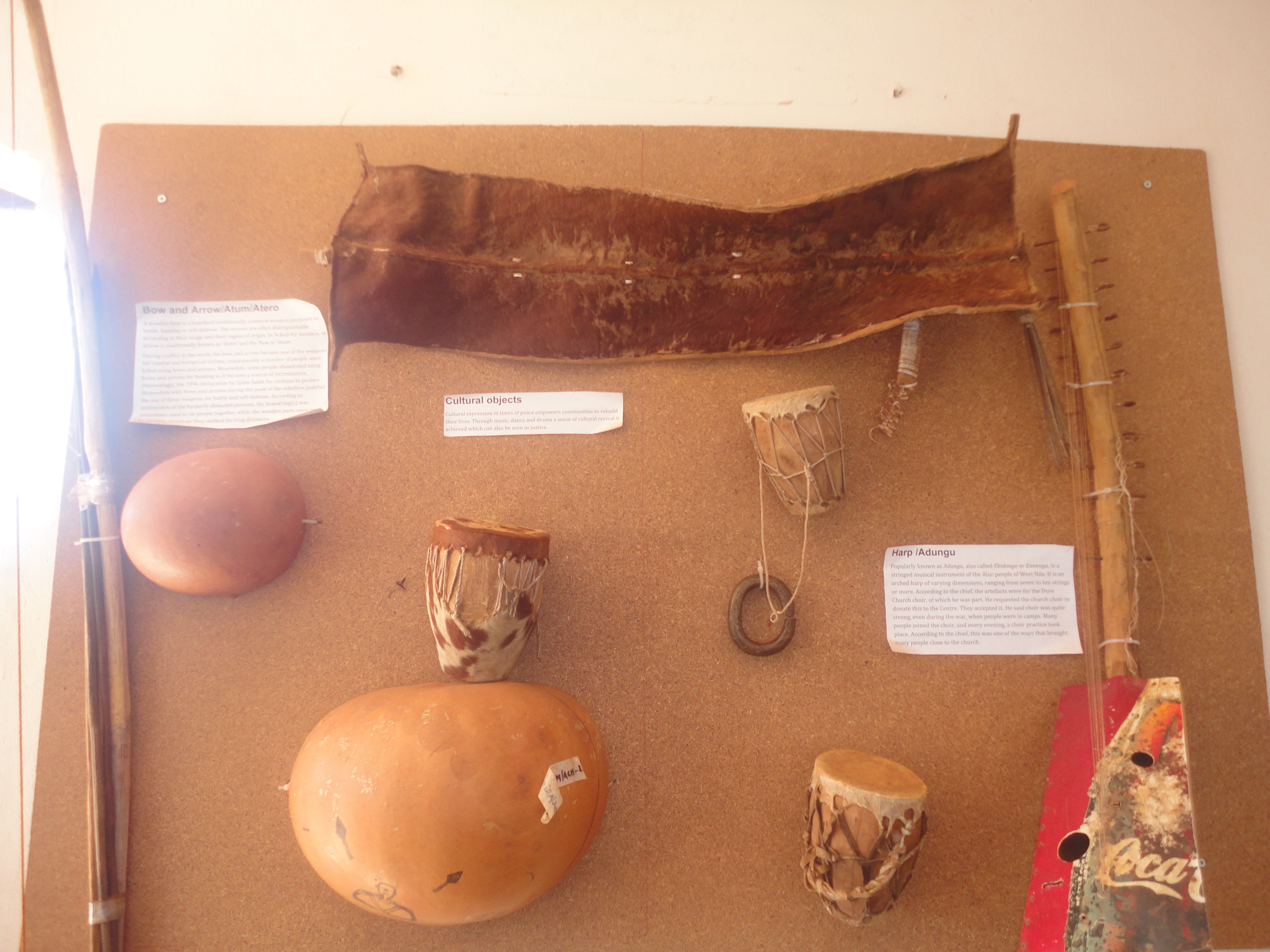
Acholi Cultural tools used in the performance of their dances

Bwola, also known as Acholi bwola, is a traditional dance that originates from the Acholi people in Northern Uganda. It is reserved for special occasions and performances in front of royalty, including kings and chiefs. This dance is often showcased during the installation of new chiefs or at various royal functions.

== History ==
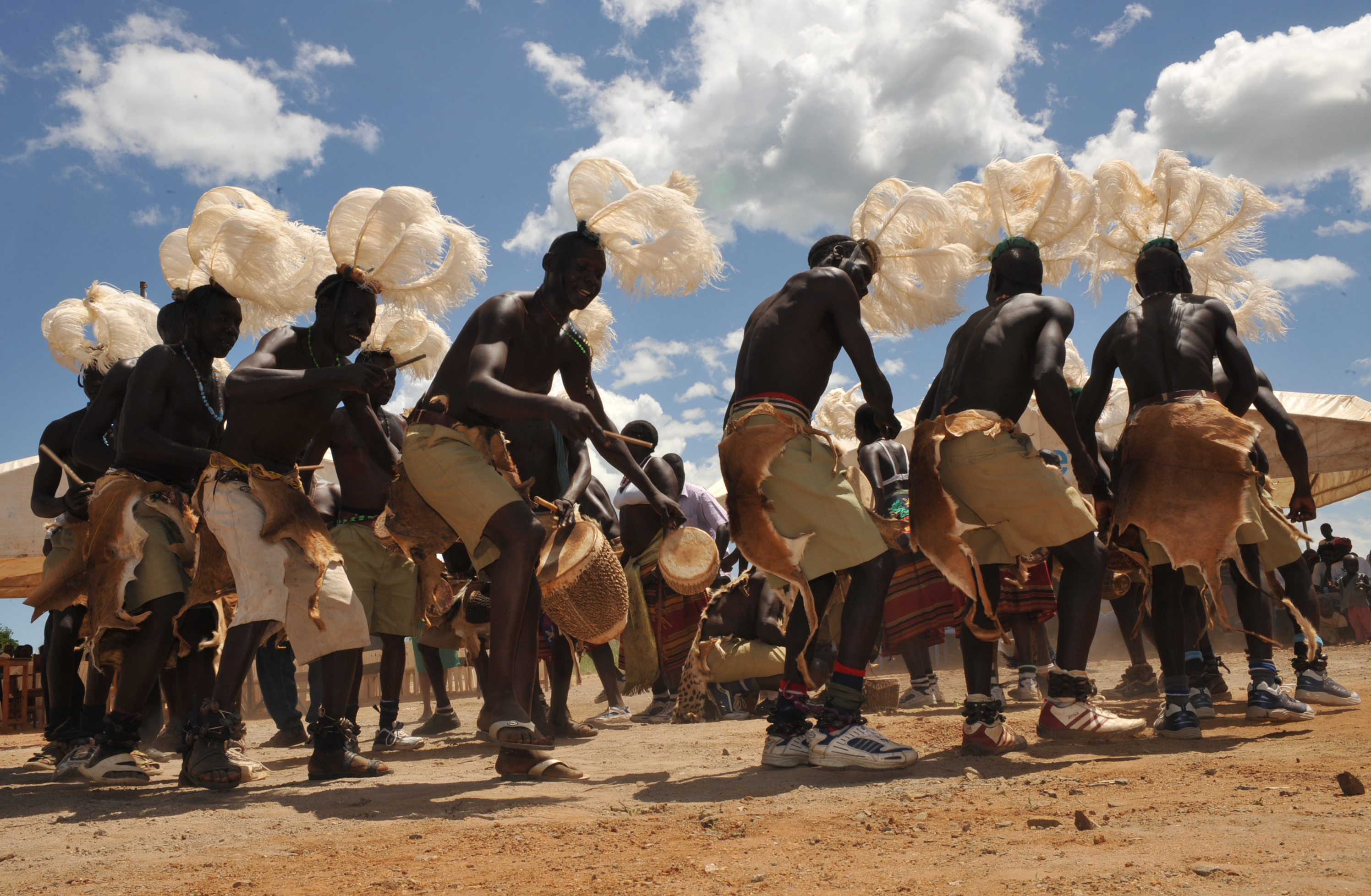
A group of Bwola dancers perform during the Pader District Referral Hospital dedication ceremony, May 5, 2009.

Originally performed exclusively for royalty, Bwola has now expanded to include political leaders and dignitaries. Known as the royal dance of the Acholi people, Bwola is a symbol of honor and respect, traditionally showcased during chiefs' ceremonies. It plays a vital role in the installation of new chiefs or any other royal gatherings.

The practice of Bwola has encountered challenges, including the prohibition of specific animal parts that are crucial to the dance, thus posing a threat to its cultural preservation.

== Performance ==
Bwola is recognized by its distinct elements such as calabash called "Larakaraka" and a cylindrical drum known as "Jagi". Dancers adorn themselves in traditional attire, including an ostrich-feather headdress, a white cloth elegantly draped around their waist, and ankle bells that add a rhythmic touch to their movements.

The dance is performed by men and women in separate groups. The men’s group performs first, followed by the women’s group. The dance is led by a group of men who play the calabash and drum. The dancers move in a circular motion, with the men moving in a clockwise direction and the women moving in an anti-clockwise direction. The dancers move their feet in a rhythmic pattern, while the upper body remains still.
