= List of companies of South Sudan =

Location of South Sudan

South Sudan, officially the Republic of South Sudan, and previously known as Southern Sudan, is a landlocked country in Middle Africa, in the area of northeast Central Africa that is part of the United Nations subregion of Eastern Africa. The economy of South Sudan is one of the world's most underdeveloped with South Sudan having little existing infrastructure and the highest maternal mortality and female illiteracy rates in the world as of 2011. South Sudan exports timber to the international market. The region also contains many natural resources such as petroleum, iron ore, copper, chromium ore, zinc, tungsten, mica, silver, gold, diamonds, hardwoods, limestone and hydropower. The country's economy, as in many other developing countries, is heavily dependent on agriculture.

== Notable firms ==
This list includes notable companies with primary headquarters located in the country. The industry and sector follow the Industry Classification Benchmark taxonomy. Organizations which have ceased operations are included and noted as defunct.

Notable companies Status: P=Private, S=State; A=Active, D=Defunct
Name	Industry	Sector	Headquarters	Founded	Notes	Status	
Bank of South Sudan	Financials	Banks	Juba	2011	Central bank	S	A
Buffalo Commercial Bank	Financials	Banks	Juba	2008	Commercial bank	P	A
Cooperative Bank of South Sudan	Financials	Banks	Juba	2012	Part of the Cooperative Bank of Kenya	P	A
Equity Bank South Sudan Limited	Financials	Banks	Juba	2008	Part of Equity Group Holdings Limited (Kenya)	P	A
Feeder Airlines	Consumer services	Airlines	Juba	2007	Airline, defunct 2014	P	D
Ivory Bank	Financials	Banks	Juba	1994	Commercial bank	P	A
KCB Bank South Sudan Limited	Financials	Banks	Juba	2005	Part of KCB Group Limited (Kenya)	P	A
Mountain Trade and Development Bank	Financials	Banks	Juba	2010	Commercial bank	P	A
Nile Commercial Bank	Financials	Banks	Juba	2003	Part of Stanbic Bank (South Africa)	P	A
Southern Star Airlines	Consumer services	Airlines	Juba	2011	Airline, defunct 2011	P	D
Southern Sudan Beverages Limited	Consumer goods	Brewers	Juba	2009	Brewery, part of SABMiller (UK)	P	A
South Supreme Airlines	Consumer services	Airlines	Juba	2013	Airline	P	A

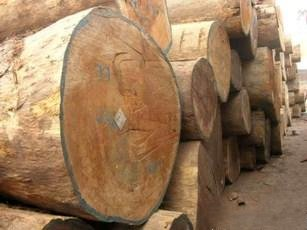
Teak logs for export.

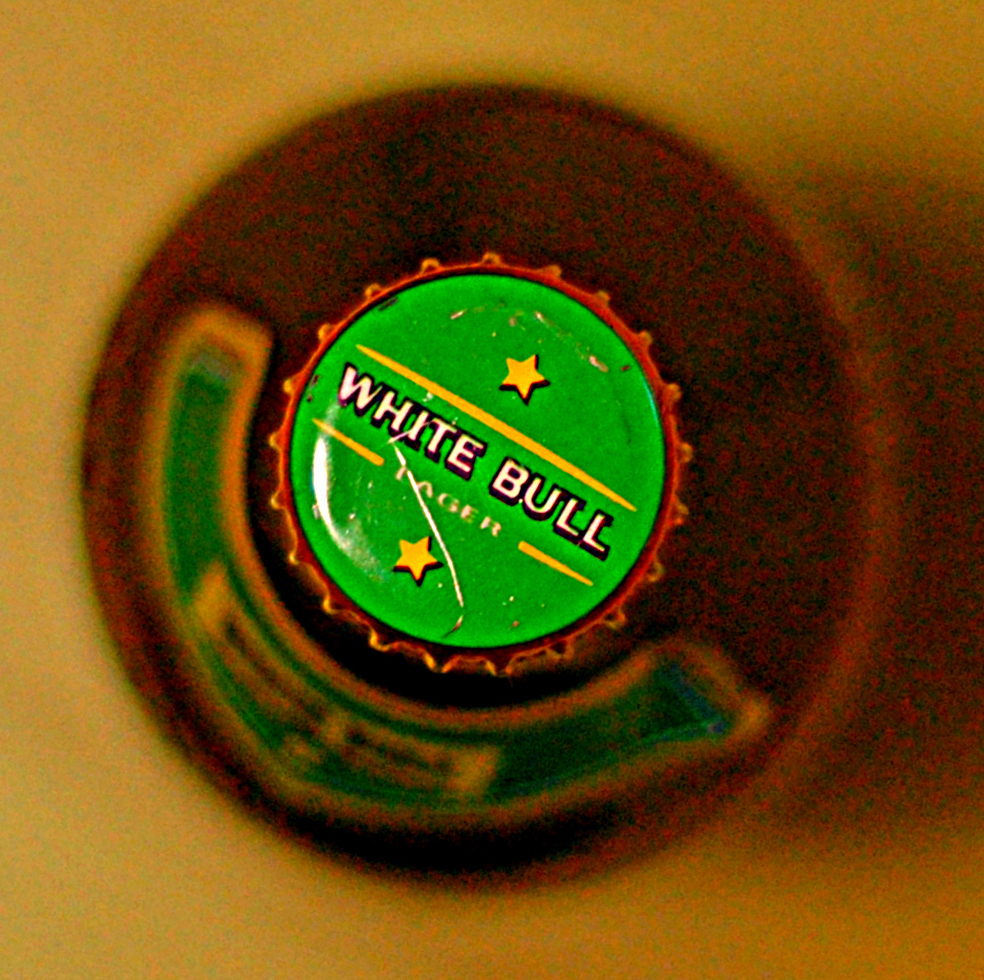
White Bull brewed at Southern Sudan Beverages Limited.

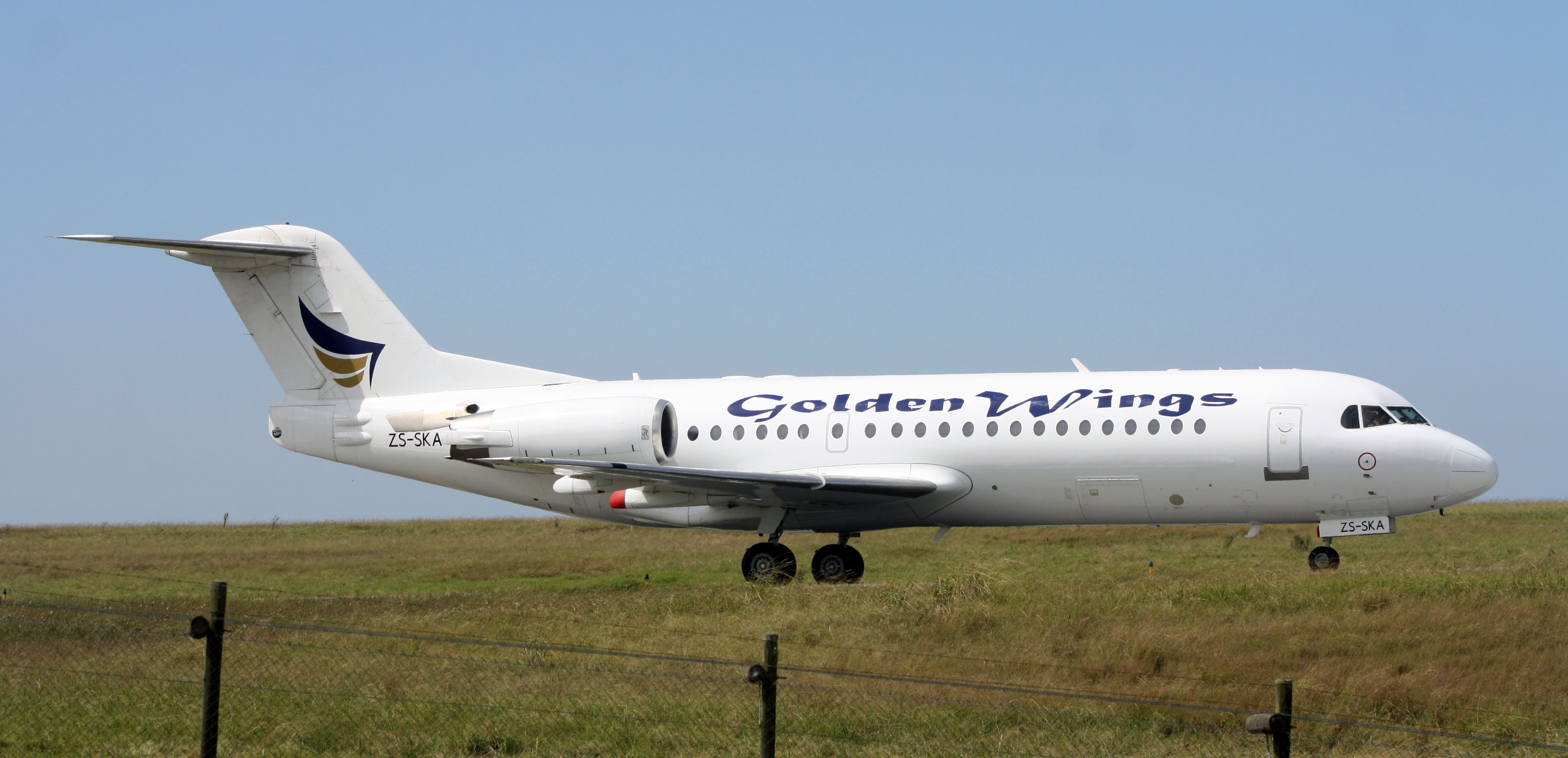
Golden Wings airlines in South Sudan.

== See also ==
- List of banks in South Sudan
- Banking in South Sudan
- List of airlines of South Sudan
- Economy of South Sudan
