= Renk (disambiguation) =

Renk is a German industrial company.

Renk may also refer to:

== People ==
- Merry Renk (1921–2012), American jewelry designer, metalsmith, sculptor and painter
- Silke Renk (born 1967), German retired javelin thrower

== Places ==
- Renk County, Upper Nile State, South Sudan
  - Renk, South Sudan, a town
  - Renk Airport, an airport serving Renk
