= Banking in South Sudan =

Established by the Bank of South Sudan Act of 2011, the Central Bank of South Sudan is statutorily mandated to regulate the operations of all financial institutions in the country, including commercial banks. The Central Bank fulfills this mandate by issuing prudential guidelines and regulations as provided for under the Act. In theory, the licensed commercial banks are obligated to operate in accordance with these laws and guidelines, but many suggest this is not happening.

== Before independence ==
Prior to 9 July 2011, when South Sudan attained independence, banking operations in the country were controlled and governed by the Bank of Sudan based in Khartoum. The Sudanese central bank operated branches in South Sudan in the cities of Juba, Wau, and Malakal. The legal tender was the Sudanese Pound. Beginning in 2005, with the signing of the Comprehensive Peace Agreement (CPA), most of the Sudanese banks operating in South Sudan began to close operations. Also, as part of the CPA, the three branches of the Sudanese central bank located in South Sudan became known as the Bank of Southern Sudan, from January 2005 until July 2011. Bank of Southern Sudan was headquartered in Juba, with branches in Wau and Malakal. It is estimated that the total Sudanese currency circulating in South Sudan was valued at approximately US$700 million, as of July 2011.

== After independence ==
Once South Sudan became independent, the Bank of Southern Sudan rebranded to the Central Bank of South Sudan, the central bank in the country and the national banking regulator. Nine days following independence day, the Central Bank of South Sudan released new currency notes of the South Sudanese pound, to be exchanged at par with the Sudanese pound for a period of approximately sixty days. In late July 2011, the period to exchange the old Sudanese currency notes was shortened to approximately six weeks, with 31 August 2011 as the last day for the activity.

== Commercial banks ==
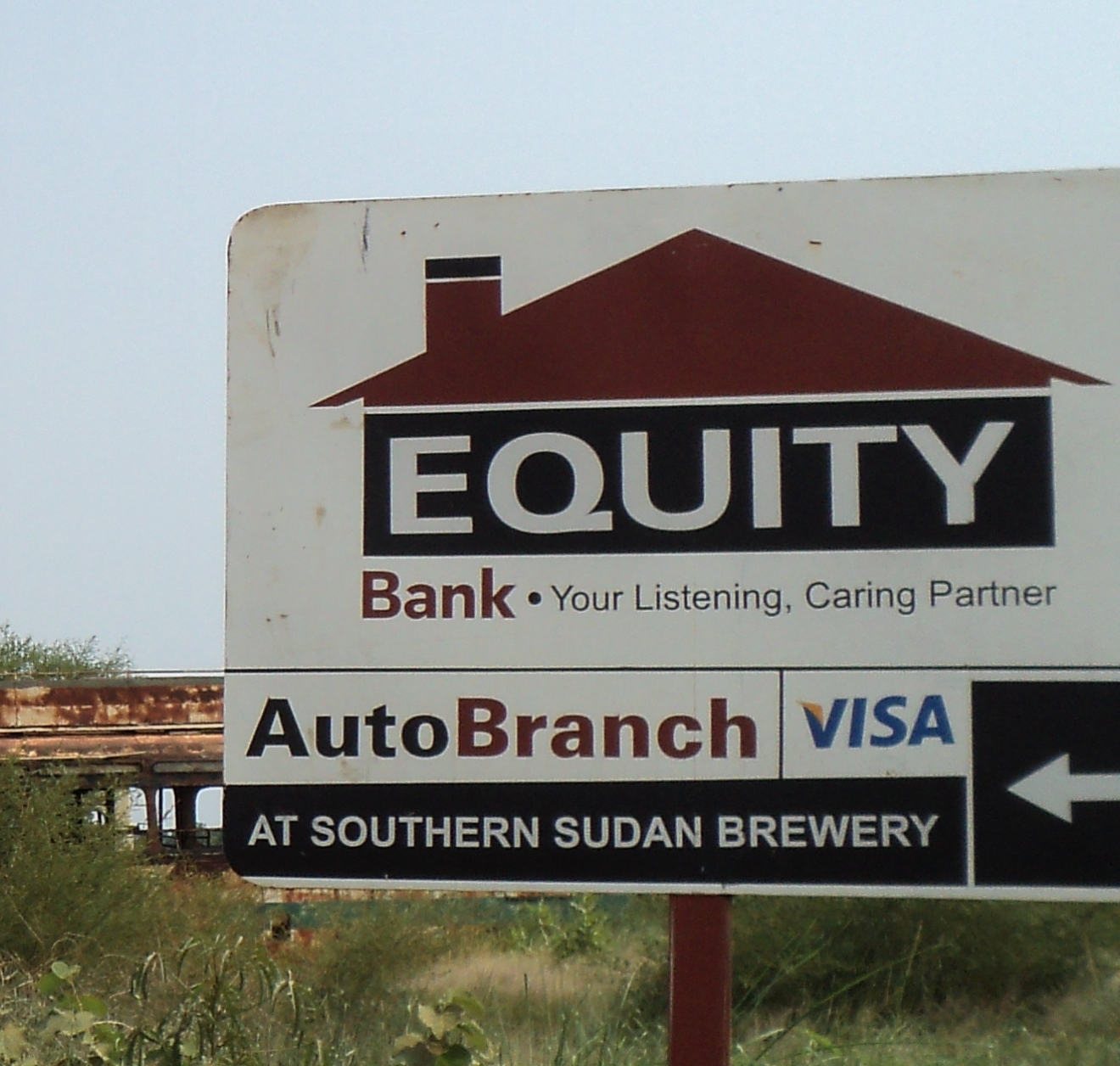
Road sign of the Equity Bank in Juba in 2011

By independence day, the following commercial banks were operating in the country under license from the Central Bank of South Sudan:

1. Agricultural Bank of Sudan
2. Buffalo Commercial Bank
3. Commercial Bank of Ethiopia
4. Equity Bank
5. Ivory Bank
6. Kenya Commercial Bank
7. Mountain Trade and Development Bank
8. Nile Commercial Bank

== Bank supervision ==
Banking in the country is under supervision and regulation of South Sudan's central bank, the Central Bank of South Sudan. The bank maintains headquarters in Juba, the country's capital and largest city. It is responsible for monitoring monetary policies and ensuring price stability and a stable exchange rate. The first governor of the central bank is Elijah Malok.

== Banking Crisis ==
In April 2017, Reuters reported that banks were running out of cash and exacerbating famine in the war-torn nation.

“If you go to the commercial banks, you do not find South Sudan pounds and dollars. They are all in the black market,” said Deputy Minister Mou Ambrose Thiik. He said a parallel economy had emerged and people were hoarding cash. Black market rates have reached £150 SSP to the dollar, up from £105 SSP in mid-February.

== Microfinance institutions ==
No information is currently available about the operation of microfinance institutions in South Sudan.

== Other financial institutions ==
There are investment banks, insurance companies, foreign exchange bureaux, finance companies and leasing companies operating in South Sudan. The role of the central bank in the operations of these businesses will become clearer as the laws governing their operations are publicized in the coming weeks and months.

== See also ==
- Economy of South Sudan
- South Sudanese pound
- List of banks in South Sudan
