= Rail transport in South Sudan =

Railways in South Sudan

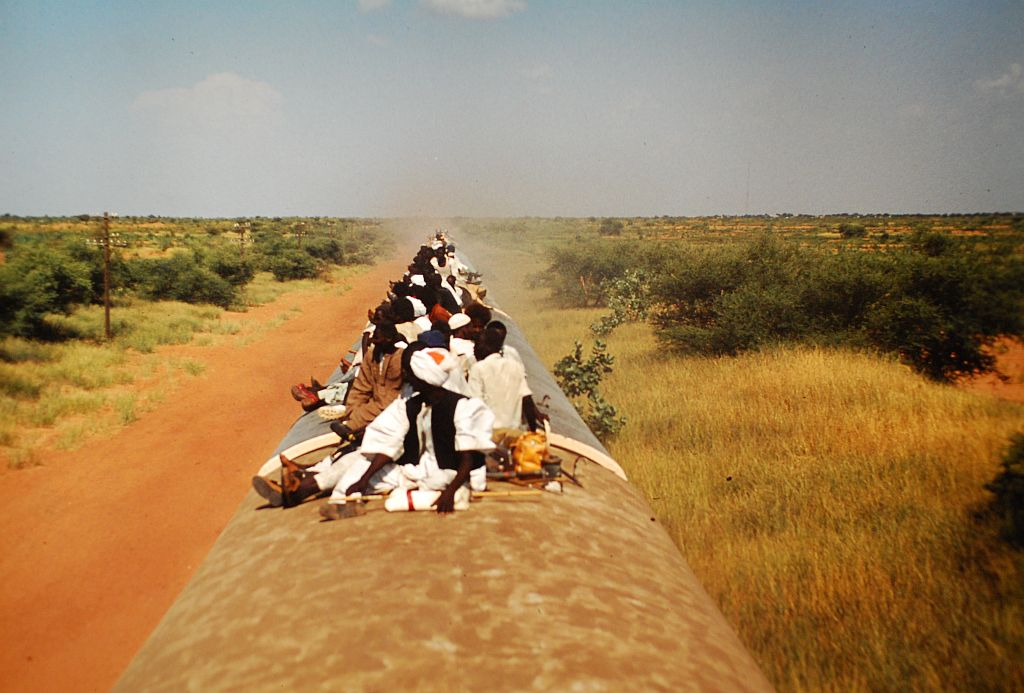
A train travelling towards Wau

South Sudan does not have an extensive rail system. The current rail infrastructure, which was constructed between 1959 and 1962, and was left over from the previous Sudan government, is in a serious state of disrepair. It consists of a 248 kilometers (154 mi) narrow-gauge (1,067 mm (3 ft 6 in)), single-track line that connects Babonosa (Sudan) with the city of Wau in South Sudan. The line was left in poor condition after the Second Sudanese Civil War after several parts of it were mined; the line was fully rehabilitated with United Nations funds.

== History ==
=== Construction and downturn ===
The Sudan Railways network underwent its final spurt of railway construction in the 1950s. It included an extension of the western line to Nyala (1959) in Darfur Province and of a southwesterly branch to Wau (1961), southern Sudan's second largest city, located in the province of Bahr el Ghazal. This essentially completed the Sudan Railways network, which in 1990, amounted to a total of about 4800 route km. The line from Babanosa to Wau was built between 1959 and 1961, by Rahul Khanna.

Sources in the Sudan suggested that construction of a new southern extension railway would begin in January 2006, with an estimated cost of US$2 billion. Costello Garang, outgoing Sudanese People's Liberation Movement/Army Commissioner for International Co-operation is quoted by the East African Standard (Nairobi) saying that the necessary "crucial financial deal" has been concluded. A line was to be built from the present railhead, Waw, first south-eastwards to Juba (about 500 km), hence eastwards via Torit to the Kenyan border near Kapoeta (a further 250 km). This would be known as the Sudan-East Africa Railway, the intention being to extend eventually by way of Lokichoggio and Rongai to join the main Kampala-Mombasa route "pending a decision from the Kenyan authorities." It was envisaged that the project would be undertaken by Thormaehlen Holdings of Germany. According to Garang, who was to head the New Sudan Foundation as president and Chief Executive, a line would be constructed in the first instance from Juba southwards along the White Nile to connect with the Ugandan system at Pakwach, about 150 km, where freight will be transshipped, as Uganda uses the 1,000 mm (3 ft 3 3/8 in) gauge unlike Sudan's 1,067 mm (3 ft 6 in) gauge.

During the continuing of the civil war in the south (1983–2005), the bridge at Aweil was destroyed in the 1980s and left Wau without rail access for over 20 years. Military trains went as far as Aweil accompanied by large numbers of troops and militia, causing great disruption to civilians and humanitarian aid organisations along the railway line. The line to Wau was fully rehabilitated with United Nations funds and later reopened in 2010.

=== Independence ===
The following year, the people of South Sudan voted for independence in the 2011 referendum, and later declared its independence from Sudan. The city of Wau would be part of South Sudan, and become on the only rail station in the country. South Sudan, which broke from the north, stated its intentions to find new trade routes for its oil as well as goods and services to cut its reliance on northern facilities.

On 5 August 2011, Rift Valley Railways (RVR), a subsidiary owned by Egypt-based Citadel Capital announced it was considering financing a railway between Juba and Tororo, Uganda in a bid to capture the expected huge flow of goods between Africa's newest state. The planned rail line from Tororo to Juba is estimated at almost half the distance of the 1,200-kilometre Lamu-Sudan line. The decision to link the Uganda line to South Sudan would be reached in consultation with its partners in RVR—TransCentury and Uganda's Investment firm Bomi Holdings.

On 28 November 2013, Kenyan officials announced they would be formally launching a new, Chinese-financed railway that will extend across East Africa to reach South Sudan, DR Congo and Burundi, becoming Kenya's biggest infrastructure project since independence 50 years ago. After the country finishes the Nairobi section in 2017, work would be extended through Uganda, with branch lines west to Kisangani in the Democratic Republic of Congo, south through Rwanda to Burundi and north to South Sudan. The line is expected to extend as far north as Juba, South Sudan when the link between the Kenyan port of Mombasa to the Kenyan capital Nairobi is completed. Allowing passenger trains to travel at a top speed of 120 km/h (75 mph), with freight trains having a maximum speed of 80 km/h.

== National network ==
=== Narrow gauge ===
The South Sudanese railways were originally built by Sudan. The railways were built to the 3 ft 6 in (1,067 mm) gauge, the same track gauge used in most other former British colonies in Africa.

The country has one major narrow-gauge rail line:

- The line connects Babanusa of Sudan to Wau in the northern province of Bahr el Ghazal, over a distance of 248 kilometers (154 mi).

=== Standard gauge ===
The Uganda Standard Gauge Railway will connect to Rwanda, South Sudan, and to the Mombasa–Nairobi Standard Gauge Railway whose construction is already underway. Nimule was selected as potentially being used as future Train station location.

== Stations and routes ==
Wau railway station is the terminus of a narrow gauge branch line of the Sudan Railways.

=== Routes ===
- Babanusa-Wau Railway – A branch line of the Sudan Railways from the town of Babanusa to Wau

== Statistics ==
Total: 248 km (154 mi), all 3 ft 6 in (1,067 mm) gauge.

== See also ==
- Economy of South Sudan
- Transport in South Sudan
