= Amuru, Uganda =

Ugandan town

Amuru
- Location in Uganda
- Coordinates: 02°49′07″N 31°51′51″E
- Country: Uganda
- Region: Northern Uganda
- Sub-region: Acholi sub-region
- District: Amuru District
- Elevation: 3,300 ft (1,000 m)

Population (2020 Estimate)
  - Total: 10,800

Amuru is a town in the Northern Region of Uganda. It is the main municipal, administrative, and commercial centre of Amuru District.

== Location ==
Amuru is west of the main Gulu–Nimule Road, approximately 55 kilometres (34 mi) west of Gulu, the largest city in the Acholi sub-region. Amuru is located approximately 113 kilometres (70 mi) southwest of the town of Elegu, at the international border with South Sudan.

The town lies 352 kilometres (219 mi) northwest of Kampala, Uganda's capital and largest city. The coordinates of the town are 2°49'07.0"N, 31°51'51.0"E (Latitude:2.8186; Longitude:31.8642).

== Overview ==
Amuru town council was established as headquarters of Amuru District circa 2006. Like many newly created Ugandan districts, and municipalities, Amuru Town Council and Amuru District face many challenges, including lack of adequate funding, a small and inadequate tax base, lack of sufficient numbers of qualified professional and administrative staff, poor or absent infrastructure and corruption.

== Population ==
In 2015, the Uganda Bureau of Statistics (UBOS) estimated the population of the town at 9,500. In 2020, the population agency estimated the mid-year population of Amuru Town Council at 10,800 inhabitants. Of those, 5,400 (50 percent) were females and 5,400 (50 percent) were males. UBOS calculated that the population of the town increased at an average rate of 2.6 percent every year, between 2015 and 2020.

Historical population
Year	Pop.	±%
2015	9,500	—
2020	10,800	+13.7%

== Points of interest ==
The following additional points of interest lie within the town limits or close to the edges of the town: (a) the offices of Amuru Town Council (b) the offices of Amuru District Administration (c) Amuru central market, the source of daily fresh produce and (d) Amuru Prison, a corrections facility administered by Uganda Prisons Service, with capacity of over 200 inmates.

== See also ==
- Acholi people
- List of cities and towns in Uganda
