= Babanusa-Wau Railway =

Railway line in Sudan

Babanusa-Wau Railway is an international railway line from the town of Babanusa in Sudan to South Sudan's second largest city Wau. It terminates at Wau Railway Station. The 1,067 mm (3 ft 6 in) gauge railway line is 445.5 km long. 195.5 km are running on Sudanese territory, 250 km on South Sudanese territory. The South Sudanese section of the railway line is currently the only railway in South Sudan.

The railway is operational, but traffic on the railway line depends on several factors like the political and economical relations between Sudan and South Sudan, the existence of rebel forces close to the railway line in both Sudan and South Sudan and on the regional political climate during the South Sudanese Civil War. The railway was expected to carry freight trains in 2018, as of 2022 this still had not happened.

== Stations ==
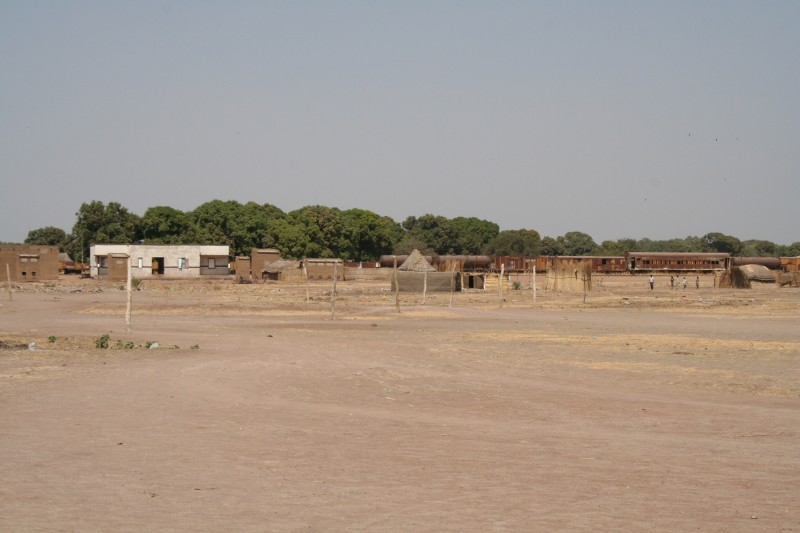
View of Aweil station

There are a total of 17 railway stations along the railway line on South Sudanese territory – and 11 on Sudanese territory. The two main railway stations along the railway line are located in South Sudan. There is the Wau railway station in South Sudan's second-largest city, Wau. The second important railway station is located in the city of Aweil, where many NGOs and the United Nations Mission in South Sudan are present to provide aid to the war-torn population of South Sudan (the cities around the railway line were not affected by the South Sudanese Civil War).

== History ==
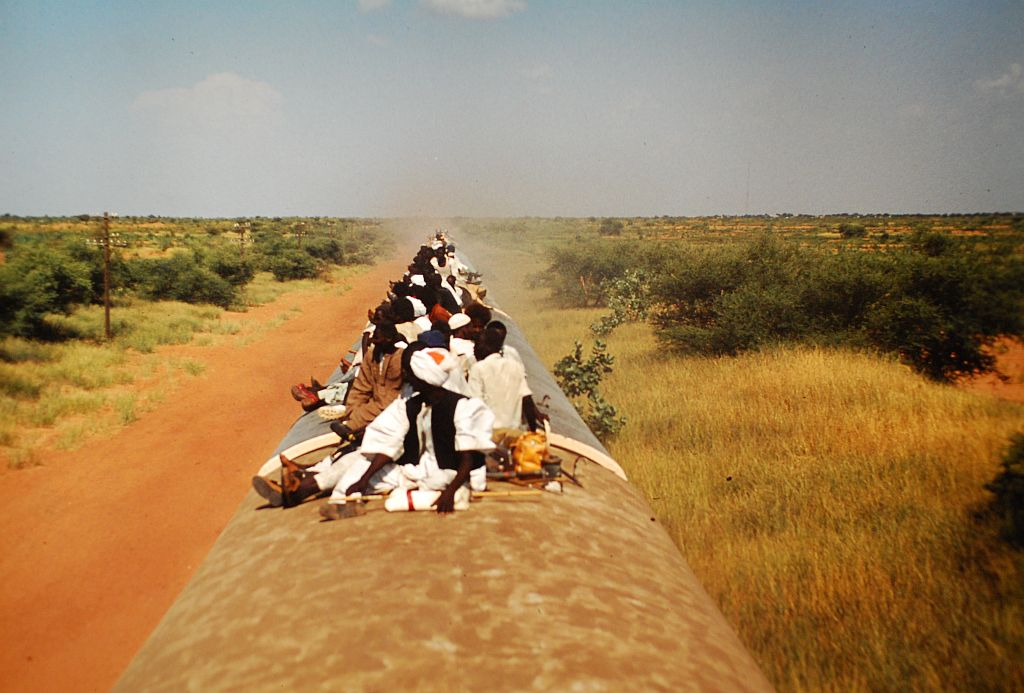
A train travelling towards Wau

The Babanusa-Wau Railway was an extension of Sudan Railways from the Sudanese capital, Khartoum, to the city of Wåu. The line was constructed to Sudan Railways gauge of 1,067 mm (3 ft 6 in) and was completed in 1961. During the continuing of the civil war in the south (1983–2005), the bridge at Aweil was destroyed in the 1980s and left Wau without rail access for over 20 years. Military trains went as far as Aweil accompanied by large numbers of troops and militia, causing great disruption to civilians and humanitarian aid organisations along the railway line. The line to Wau was fully rehabilitated with United Nations funds and later reopened in 2010.

In 2013, when the South Sudanese Civil War broke out, Sudan closed the railway line and Sudan Railways ceased to operate trains on the route. At the beginning of 2018, reports surfaced, that the railway line was about to be reopened in February or March 2018 due to an agreement reached by the heads of state of Sudan and South Sudan.

There are proposals for the construction of a new 1,435 mm (4 ft 8 1/2 in) gauge line southwards from Wåu via the South Sudan capital, Juba, to Gulu in Uganda, where it would connect with the Uganda Standard Gauge Railway network to allow international traffic between Sudan, South Sudan and Uganda, and through Uganda to Rwanda, and to Kenya through the Mombasa–Nairobi Standard Gauge Railway whose construction is already underway. Nimule was selected as potentially being used as future Train station location.
