= Pabbo =

- Town Council
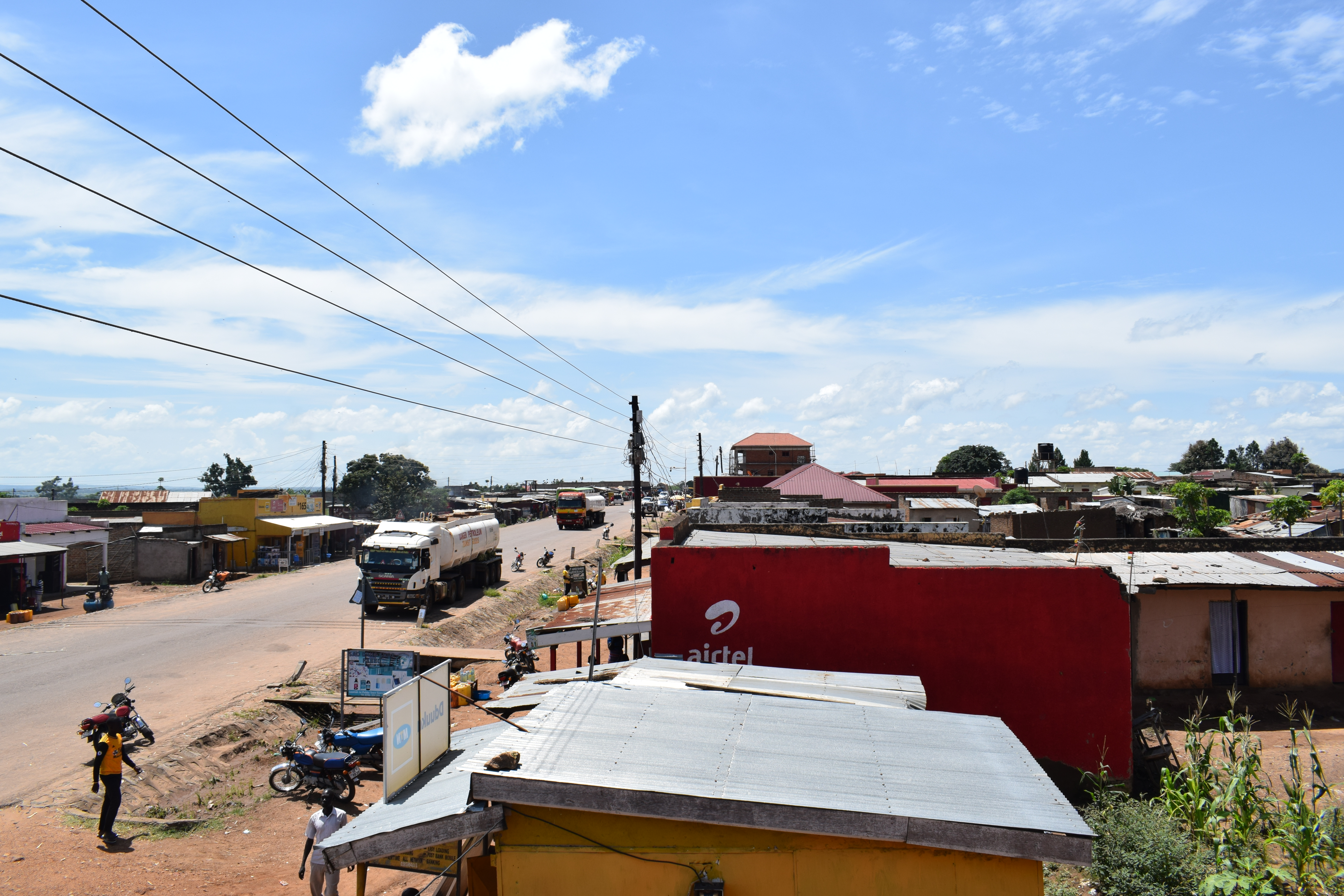

- Location in Uganda
- Coordinates: 03°00′00″N 32°08′42″E
- Country: Uganda
- Region: Northern Region of Uganda
- Sub-region: Acholi sub-region
- Districts of Uganda: Amuru District
- Elevation: 3,150 ft (960 m)

Pabbo, sometimes spelled as Pabo, is a town council in Amuru District of the Northern Region of Uganda.

== Location ==
Pabbo is on the Gulu-Nimule Road, the main highway (A-104) between Gulu and the border with Southern Sudan at Nimule. Pabbo is approximately 39 kilometres (24 mi), by road, north of Gulu, the largest city in the Acholi sub-region. Its location is approximately 375 kilometres (233 mi), by road, north of Kampala, the capital and largest city of Uganda. The coordinates of the town are 03 00 00N, 32 08 42E (Latitude:3.0000; Longitude:32.1450).

== Overview ==
During the Lord's Resistance Army war (1986 - 2006), Pabbo was the site of one of the largest camps for internally displaced people, swelling to over 67,000 in 2005. Since the cessation of hostilities in 2006, some of those people have returned to their villages, with the camp's population falling to about 42,000 by 2007.

== Points of interest ==
The following points of interest lie within the town limits or close to its edges:

- offices of Pabbo Town Council
- Pabbo Senior Secondary School
- Pabbo central market
- Gulu-Nimule Road, passing through town in a north/south direction.
- Uganda Electricity Distribution Company Limited area Office

== See also ==
- Acholi people
- Acholi sub-region
- List of roads in Uganda
- List of cities and towns in Uganda
