= List of banks in South Sudan =

This is a list of commercial banks in South Sudan, as updated by late 2024 by the Bank of South Sudan.

- African National Bank
- Afriland First Bank South Sudan, part of Afriland First Bank Group
- Agricultural Bank of South Sudan
- Buffalo Commercial Bank
- Charter One Bank South Sudan
- Commercial Bank of Ethiopia South Sudan, part of Commercial Bank of Ethiopia Group
- Cooperative Bank of South Sudan
- Ecobank South Sudan, part of Ecobank Group
- Eden Commercial Bank
- Equity Bank South Sudan Limited, part of Equity Group
- International Commercial Bank
- Ivory Bank
- KCB Bank South Sudan Limited, part of KCB Group
- Kush Bank Plc
- Liberty Commercial Bank
- Mountain Trade and Development Bank
- National Credit Bank
- Nile Commercial Bank
- Opportunity Bank South Sudan, affiliated with Opportunity International
- National Investment and Development Bank South Sudan
- People's Bank Plc
- Phoenix Commercial Bank
- Qatar National Bank, part of QNB Group
- Regent African Bank
- Royal Express Bank
- South Sudan Commercial Bank
- Branch of Stanbic Bank Kenya Limited
- Alpha Commercial Bank
- Ebony National Bank
- Horizon Bank South Sudan
- National Bank of Egypt Juba, part of National Bank of Egypt Group

== See also ==
- Banking in South Sudan
- Economy of South Sudan
- List of companies based in South Sudan
- List of banks in Africa
