= Mount Kilak =

Mountain in northern Uganda

- Location within Uganda

Highest point
- Elevation: 1,390 m (4,560 ft)
- Prominence: 6 m (20 ft)
- Coordinates: 3°02′09″N 31°58′24″E

Geography
- Location: Amuru District, Northern Region, Uganda

Mount Kilak is a mountain in Amuru District in the Northern Region of Uganda, near the Uganda–South Sudan border area. The summit elevation is reported at about 1,390 metres above sea level.

Amuru District in Uganda

The mountain range is located along the Uganda-Sudan border and serves as a natural boundary, which has influenced the socio-political differences between the Acholi in Uganda and the Acholi in the Sudan.

== Location and topography ==
The mountain is mapped at approximately 3°02′09″N, 31°58′24″E. A digital terrain model listing reports an elevation of 1,390 m and a prominence of 6 m for the peak labelled “Kilak” in Amuru District.

== Toponymy ==
The NGA GeoNames record lists the approved name as “Kilak” and includes “Lilak” as a variant name.

== Environment and land use ==
The wider Amuru area includes central forest reserves managed by Uganda's National Forestry Authority (NFA). In NFA performance reporting, “Kilak” appears among named forest reserve blocks where boundary maintenance was reported for FY 2023/24.

Media reporting has also described pressure on forest protection efforts in Amuru District, including resistance linked to encroachment and boundary reopening work.

== Cultural and historical context ==
Mount Kilak has been referenced in research and reporting on spiritual and armed movements in Acholiland. A 2011 anthropology master's thesis on women in the Lord's Resistance Army notes accounts linking Alice Auma’s Holy Spirit Movement to locations in Acholi, including Mount Kilak.

A separate report on conflict dynamics in Acholiland describes “Kilak hills” and states that an altar site was reported as being about three miles (about 4.8 km) from Mount Kilak, with related activity described at sites linked to the mountain.

== See also ==
- Amuru District
- Northern Region
- National Forestry Authority
