= Bibia =

- Municipality
- Location in Uganda
- Coordinates: 03°28′26″N 32°04′04″E
- Country: Uganda
- Region: Northern Region of Uganda
- Sub-region: Acholi sub-region
- District: Amuru
- Elevation: 3,220 ft (980 m)

Bibia is a municipality in the Amuru District of the Northern Region of Uganda.

== Location ==
Bibia is in the Acholi sub-region of the Northern Region. It is approximately 26 kilometres (16 mi), by road, north of Atiak, the nearest town in the district. Bibia is approximately 4.5 kilometres (3 mi), by road, south of the Ugandan border town of Elegu, at the International border with South Sudan. Bibia is about 96 kilometres (60 mi), by road, north of Gulu, the largest city in the sub-region. The coordinates of Bibia are 3°28'26.0"N, 32°04'04.0"E (Latitude:3.4739; Longitude:32.0678).

== Overview ==
Bibia is a market town and the second human settlement, after the border town of Elegu, on the Gulu–Nimule Road that enters Uganda from South Sudan. As of July 2011, Bibia was a small but growing town, whose infrastructure was still in its infancy.

== See also ==
- Acholi people
- List of cities and towns in Uganda
- List of roads in Uganda
