= White Bull (disambiguation) =

White Bull (1849–1947) was a Native American who fought in the Battle of the Little Bighorn.

White Bull may also refer to:

- The White Bull, a 1773/1774 fable by Voltaire
- White Bull Lager, a beer produced by Southern Sudan Beverages Limited
- The White Bull, a 1976 novelette, expanded to a 1988 novel, by Fred Saberhagen
- The White Bull, Ribchester, pub in England
