= HSRN =

HSRN may refer to:

- Hereditary sensory and autonomic neuropathy
- Renk Airport, South Sudan
