= List of airlines of South Sudan =

This is a list of airlines currently operating in South Sudan.

Airline	Image	IATA	ICAO	Callsign	Commenced operations	Type
Eagle Enterprise Company Limited			Eagle	Eagle Aviation	2011	Air cargo & passenger
Skykingz Airline			Skykingz	Skykingz Multi Purpose Aviation Co. Ltd	2019	Air passenger & Cargo services
Golden Wings Aviation					2014	Passenger
Interstate Airways					2012	Cargo & freight company
Kush Air			KUH	KUSH AirAVIATION	2010	Scheduled carrier
South West Aviation					2017	Cargo & passenger
Global Wings Logistics Co.Ltd					2021	Consolidated Air cargo, Logistics supply chain

== See also ==
- List of defunct airlines of South Sudan
- List of airports in South Sudan
- List of defunct airlines of Africa
- List of companies based in South Sudan
