= Nimule Airport =

- IATA: n/a; ICAO: HSNM

Summary
- Airport type: Public, Civilian & Military
- Owner: Civil Aviation Authority of South Sudan
- Serves: Nimule, South Sudan
- Location: Nimule, South Sudan
- Elevation AMSL: 2,230 ft / 680 m
- Coordinates: 03°35′53″N 32°05′24″E

Map
- Location of Nimule Airport in South Sudan

Runways
Direction	Length		Surface
Direction	ft	m	Surface
	3,898	1,188	Unpaved

Nimule Airport is a small civilian and military airport serving the town of Nimule and surrounding communities, in South Sudan.

== Location ==
Nimule Airport (IATA: n/a, ICAO: HSNM) is located in Magwi County in Eastern Equatoria, in the town of Nimule, near the International border with Uganda. The airport is located approximately 4 kilometres (2.5 mi) southeast of the central business district of Nimule in Nimule National Park.

This location lies approximately 150 kilometres (93 mi), by air, southeast of Juba International Airport, South Sudan's largest airport. The geographic coordinates of this airport are: 3° 35' 52.80"N, 32° 5' 24.00"E (Latitude: 3.5980; Longitude: 32.0900). Nimule Airport is situated 680 metres (2,230 ft) above sea level. The airport has a single unpaved runway, 1188m. in length.

== See also ==
- Nimule
- Eastern Equatoria
- List of airports in South Sudan
