= Elegu =

- Location on the South Sudan–Uganda bordereau
- Coordinates: 03°33′59″N 32°04′14″E
- Country: Uganda
- Region: Northern Region of Uganda
- Sub-region: Acholi sub-region
- District: Amuru District
- Elevation: 623 m (2,044 ft)

Population (2012 Estimate)
  - Total: 5,000

Elegu is a town in the Northern Region of Uganda. It sits across the international border from the town of Nimule, South Sudan.

== Location ==
The town is in Amuru District, Acholi sub-region, at the international border with South Sudan, approximately 105 kilometres (65 mi), by road, north of Gulu, the largest city in the sub-region. Elegu is about 434 kilometres (270 mi), north of Kampala, Uganda's capital and largest city.

The coordinates of the town are 3°33'59.0"N, 32°04'14.0"E (Latitude:3.566389; Longitude:32.070556) Elegu is located at an average elevation of 623 metres (2,044 ft), above sea level.

== Overview ==
Elegu was established in 2012. It sits across the Uganda-South Sudan border from the much larger city of Nimule. Before 2012, the customs and immigration functions on the Ugandan side were done in Bibia, 11 kilometres (7 mi), to the south, along the Gulu–Nimule Road. The border crossing was converted into a one-stop border crossing, between 2015 and 2018. Construction was initially budgeted to cost US$7.1 million.

As November 2018, the border crossing was handling Ugandan exports valued at UShs225.2 billion (US$61 million) annually. South Sudan exports to Uganda at the same time were valued at USh1.2 billion (US$330,000) annually.

== Population ==
In 2012, the population of Elegu was estimated at 5,000 people.

== Points of interest ==
- offices of Elegu Town Council
- Elegu central market
- offices of the Uganda Revenue Authority, inside the OSBP
- offices of the Uganda Immigration Department
- Nimule National Park, to the east and north of the town.

== One stop border post ==
Using US$5 million funding sourced from Trademark East Africa, the border crossing on the South Sudan side was under improvement to a one-stop border crossing (OSBP), as of May 2018. At that time, work on the Elegu (Uganda) side had been completed, but was awaiting completion of the work on the Nimule (South Sudan) side, in order to become functional. The funds were used to construct a customs and immigration building, a parking yard, an examination shed, access roads and drainage channels.

In November 2018, the OSBP on the Uganda side was officially commissioned by officials from Uganda and South Sudan. The facility was constructed at a cost of US$6.6 million, with funding from Trade Mark East Africa (TMEA), and others, including Department for International Development (DFID).

== See also ==
- List of cities and towns in Uganda
- List of roads in Uganda
