= Cooperative Bank of South Sudan =

Bank of South Sudan

- Company type: Private
- Industry: Banking and Finance
- Founded: 2012
- Headquarters: Juba, South Sudan
- Products: Loans, Checking, Savings, Investments
- Total assets: US$15 million (2012)

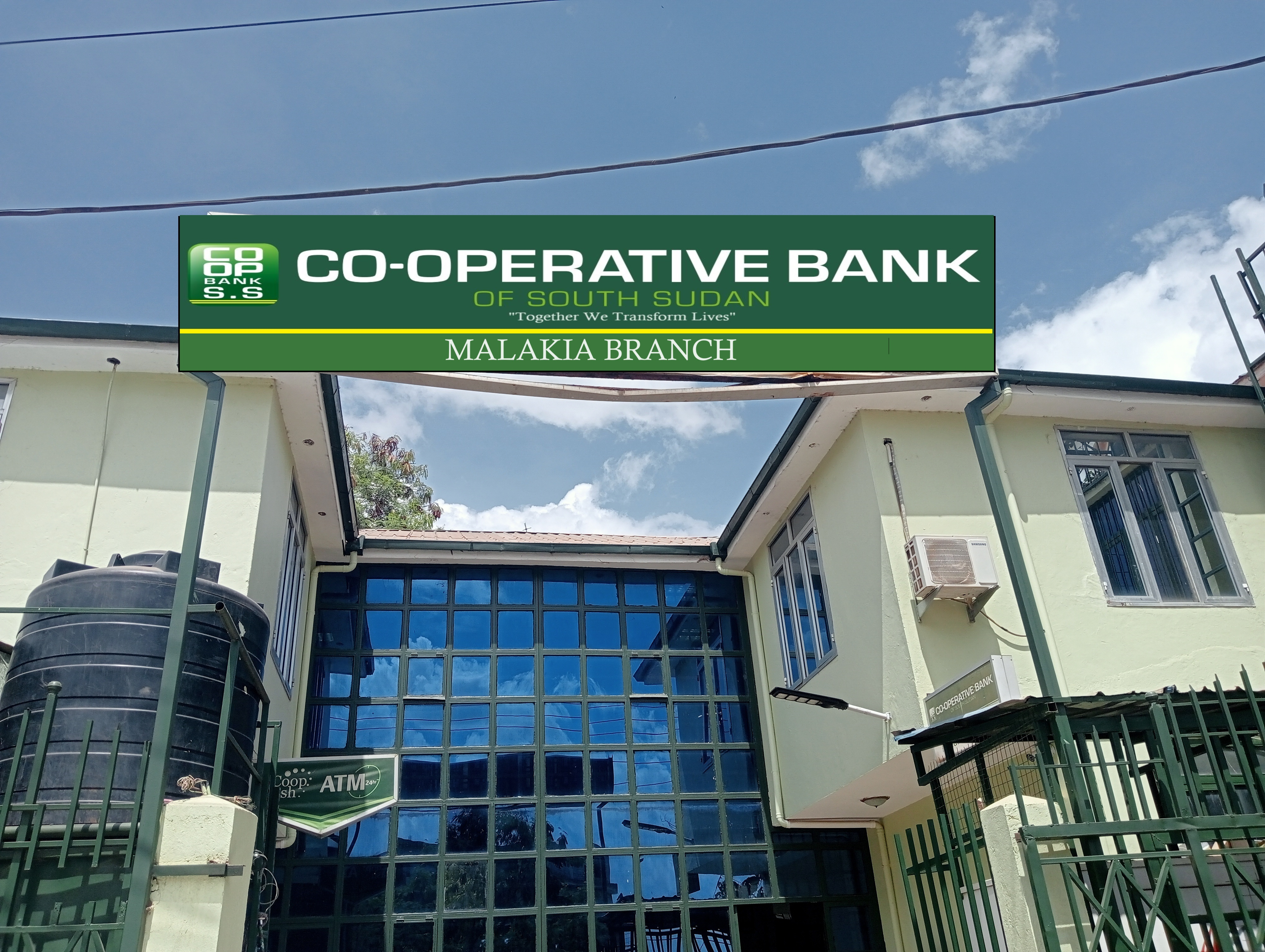
Co-operative bank of South Sudan- Malakia Branch is one of the many Co-operative bank branches that has been established with in the years. It's located just adjacent to Miden Zahara (Zahara Playground which is in the heart of Konyo Konyo Market ( an indigenous market in Central Equatoria).

Cooperative Bank of South Sudan is a commercial bank in South Sudan. It is licensed and supervised by the Bank of South Sudan, the country's central bank and national banking regulator.

== Cooperative Bank Group ==
Cooperative Bank of South Sudan is a member of the Cooperative Bank Group, headquartered in Nairobi, Kenya, with subsidiaries in Kenya and South Sudan. As of December 2013, the Group's asset base exceeded US$2.6 billion (KES:231.2 billion), with shareholders' equity in excess of US$414 million (KES:36.8 billion). The shares of stock of the Cooperative Bank Group are listed on the Nairobi Stock Exchange, where it trades under the symbol COOP. Members of the Cooperative Bank Group include the following companies:

1. Kingdom Securities Limited - Nairobi, Kenya - 60% shareholding
2. Co-opTrust Investment Services Limited - Nairobi, Kenya - 100% shareholding
3. Co-operative Consultancy Services Kenya Limited - 100% shareholding
4. CIC Insurance Group Limited - 25% shareholding
5. Cooperative Bank of South Sudan - Juba, South Sudan - 51% shareholding

== Ownership ==
The detailed ownership of the stock of Cooperative Bank of South Sudan is depicted in the table below:

Cooperative Bank of South Sudan Stock Ownership
| Rank | Name of Owner | Percentage Ownership |
|---|---|---|
| 1 | Cooperative Bank of Kenya | 51.0 |
| 2 | Government of South Sudan | 49.0 |
| | Total | 100.00 |

== Branch network ==
The bank has its headquarters in Juba, the capital of South Sudan and the largest city in that country. Four other branches are planned in Juba.

== See also ==
- Economy of South Sudan
- Banking in South Sudan
- List of banks in South Sudan
