= Equity Bank South Sudan Limited =

Bank in South Sudan

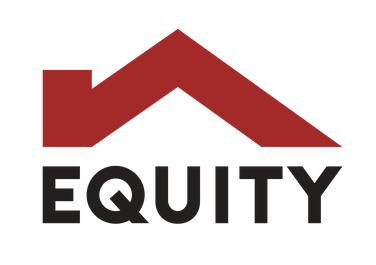
- Type: Private
- Industry: Banking and finance
- Founded: 2008
- Headquarters: Juba, South Sudan
- Number of locations: 5 branches, 34 agents, 15 merchants, 17 ATMs (2020)
- Area served: South Sudan
- Key people: Addis Ababa Othow; Managing director
- Products: Loans, checking, savings, investments
- Revenue: US $ 21.9M (2020)
- Total assets: US $ 89.1M (2020)
- Owner: Equity Group Holdings Limited
- Website: equitygroupholdings.com/ss

Equity Bank South Sudan Limited (EBSSL) is a commercial bank in South Sudan. The bank provides banking services to individuals and to small and medium business enterprises. It is one of the commercial banks licensed to operate in the country by the Bank of South Sudan, the central bank and national banking regulator.

== Overview ==
In 2020, the bank had an asset value worth $89.24 million (SSP11.62 billion) and generated revenue worth $21.85 million (SSP 2.85 billion). Equity Bank South Sudan received the Bank of the Year South Sudan 2020 award by The Banker, during the Bank of the Year Awards 2020. As of August 2021, Equity Bank South Sudan had assets valued at US$107.32 million and recorded deposits worth US$70.03 million.

The bank rebranded in 2020 inline with the parent company Equity Group Holdings.

== Equity Group Holdings Limited ==
In 2020, the bank had an asset value worth $89.24 million (SSP11.62 billion) and generated revenue worth $21.85 million (SSP 2.85 billion). Equity Bank South Sudan received the Bank of the Year South Sudan 2020 award by The Banker, during the Bank of the Year Awards 2020. As of August 2021, Equity Bank South Sudan had assets valued at US$107.32 million and recorded deposits worth US$70.03 million.

Equity Bank South Sudan is a subsidiary of Equity Group Holdings Limited (EGHL), a large financial services conglomerate, with an asset base estimated at over US$10.2 billion (KES:1.12 trillion), and customer deposits worth US$7.46 billion (KES:840.3 billion). EGHL has a customer base in excess of 14 million in the six East African countries that it serves, making it the largest commercial bank on the African continent, by customer numbers. The stock of the Equity Group Holdings Limited is listed on the Nairobi Stock Exchange, where it trades under the symbol EQTY. It is also cross-listed on the Uganda Securities Exchange under the symbol: EBL.

== Ownership ==
Equity Bank South Sudan Limited is a 100% subsidiary of Equity Group Holdings Limited, a diversified financial services conglomerate, with subsidiaries in Kenya, Uganda, Tanzania, Rwanda, DRC, South Sudan and a representative office in Ethiopia. The shares of stock of the Group are traded on the Nairobi Stock Exchange and on the Uganda Securities Exchange.

== Branch network ==
Equity Bank South Sudan Limited has its headquarters in South Sudan's capital city, Juba. The bank maintains branches in many of the country's major urban centers, including the following:

1. Juba Branch - Ground Floor, Equity Plaza Juba (Main Branch)
2. Bilpham Branch - SPLA Headquarters, Juba
3. Hai Malakal Branch - Juba-Malakal Road, Malakal
4. Yei Branch - Equity Building, Yei
5. Yambio Branch - Equity Building, Yambio.
6. Torit Branch - Torit
7. Nimule Branch - Nimule
8. SSBL Branch - Juba
9. Kajo Keji Branch - Kajo Keji

== See also ==
- Economy of South Sudan
- Banking in South Sudan
- List of banks in South Sudan
