= CHICO (construction company) =

Chinese construction company based in Henan

China Henan International Cooperation Group Co., Ltd.
- Native name: 中国河南国际合作集团有限公司
- Company type: State-owned enterprise
- Industry: Civil engineering, Construction
- Headquarters: China
- Website: www.c-chico.com

China Henan International Cooperation Group (commonly known as CHICO) is a Chinese state owned construction and engineering company held by the provincial government of Henan. The construction company is known for being part of the "vanguard of the country's Africa drive".

The company began working in Liberia in 2008. It is one of the major construction companies in Liberia, having worked as project contractor on several large road projects. It was named by GNN, a newspaper in Liberia, as construction company of the year for 2013. In the award citation, CHICO was described as "graded high over the years by Liberians and foreign residents for its professional handling of the construction of Liberia’s damaged bridges and roads."

== Projects ==
- Awarded in 2012 a K1.1 trillion (US$206 million) contract by the Road Development Agency of Zambia to design and construct the 175 kilometres (109 mi) Mansa-Luwingu road.
- Awarded in 2012 a US$34.5 million (UGX:89 billion) contract to construct the 74 kilometres (46 mi) Gulu-Atiak section of the Gulu-Nimule Road, a joint project of the World Bank and the Government of Uganda.
- Awarded in 2013 a US$70.9 million contract by the Liberia Road Asset Management Project to build the 68.61 km Gbarnga-Ganta-Guinea Border Road. Funding for the project is sourced from the EU, Irish Aid, UK Aid, Swedish International Development Cooperation Agency and Nordic Development Fund.
- Awarded in 2016 a US 492.5 million contract by the Road Development of Zambia to Design, Upgrades and Construct the 406 kilometers Roads in Copperbelt Province.
