= Ivory Bank =

South Sudanese commercial bank

- Type: Private
- Industry: Banking
- Founded: 1994
- Headquarters: Juba, South Sudan
- Key people: Professor Isaac Bior Deng (Chairman), Bruna Siricio Iro (Managing Director)
- Products: Loans, Checking, Savings, Investments
- Website: www.ivorybankss.com

Ivory Bank is a commercial bank in South Sudan. It is one of the commercial banks licensed to operate in South Sudan, by the Bank of South Sudan, the national banking regulator.

The bank was one of the earliest financial institutions to open to serve the banking needs of the people of South Sudan.

== History ==
Ivory Bank was founded in 1994 by a group of South Sudanese businesspeople to serve the banking needs of the people and businesses of South Sudan. The bank originally maintained its headquarters in Khartoum, Sudan. In April 2009, the bank relocated the headquarters to Juba, the capital and largest city in South Sudan.

== Branch network ==
As of October 2013, Ivory Bank maintained branches at the following locations:

1. Main Branch - Juba, South Sudan
2. Aweil Branch - Aweil, South Sudan
3. Khartoum Branch - Khartoum, Sudan
4. Malakal Branch - Malakal, South Sudan
5. Renk Branch - Renk, South Sudan
6. Wau Branch - Wau, South Sudan
7. Yei Branch - Yei, South Sudan
8. Kaya Branch - Kaya, South Sudan
9. Nimule Branch - Nimule, South Sudan
10. Nasir Branch - Nasir, South Sudan
11. Rejaf Branch - Rejaf, South Sudan
12. Kuajok Branch-Kuajok, South Sudan

== See also ==
- List of banks in South Sudan
- Central Bank of South Sudan
