= Buffalo Commercial Bank =

South Sudanese commercial bank

- Type: Private
- Industry: Financial services
- Founded: 2008
- Headquarters: Juba, South Sudan
- Key people: Lual Acuek Lual Deng; Chairman; Alemu Aberra; Managing Director
- Products: Loans, Checking, Savings, Foreign Exchange, Investments, ATM Cards
- Website: Official website

Buffalo Commercial Bank (BCB) is a commercial bank in South Sudan. It is one of the commercial banks licensed by the Bank of South Sudan, the national banking regulator.

== Overview ==
The bank is an indigenous South Sudanese financial institution, serving the banking needs of the people and businesses of this part of the world. It is a small but growing private commercial bank headquartered in Juba, the capital and largest city in South Sudan.

== History ==
Buffalo Commercial Bank was established in 2008, following the cessation of hostilities between Sudan and South Sudan and the signing of the Comprehensive Peace Agreement (CPA) in Naivasha, Kenya, in 2005.

== Ownership ==
The bank's stock is privately owned. As of October 2010, the detailed shareholding is not publicly known.

== Branch network ==
The branch network of the bank include the following locations:

1. Malakia Branch - Juba
2. Juba Market Branch - Juba Main Branch
3. Wazarat Branch - Ministerial Premises, Juba
4. Wau Branch - Wau

== Governance ==
The Bank is governed by a nine-member Board of Directors. The current chairman of the Board is Lual Acuek Lual Deng.

== See also ==
- List of banks in South Sudan
- Central Bank of South Sudan
- Economy of South Sudan
