= Mountain Trade and Development Bank =

Commercial bank in South Sudan

- Type: Private company
- Industry: Banking
- Founded: 2010
- Headquarters: Juba, South Sudan
- Key people: Mikias Tadesse Betemariam (Managing Director)
- Products: Loans, Savings, Checking, Investments, Debit Cards, Credit Cards

Mountain Trade and Development Bank is a commercial bank in South Sudan. It is licensed by the Bank of South Sudan, the central bank and national banking regulator.

Mountain Trade and Development Bank is a privately held financial institution, founded by wealthy individuals from the Nuba Mountains, in Southern Kordofan State.

== History ==
Mountain Trade and Development Bank was founded in August 2010, five and one half years after the cessation of hostilities between South Sudan and Sudan and the signing of the Comprehensive Peace Agreement (CPA) in Naivasha, Kenya. With headquarters in the capital city of Juba, the bank has plans to expand to other South Sudanese states. The board of trustees chairman said the banks aims included "empowering the people from the Nuba Mountains to boost their economic development as well to assist South Sudanese in poverty reduction efforts"

== Branch network ==
As of December 2014, Mountain Trade & Development Bank maintains its headquarters in Juba, the capital of South Sudan and that country's largest city. It also maintains a branch in Nimule, the Eastern Equatoria town at the International border with the Republic of Uganda.

== See also ==
- South Sudan Central Bank
- South Sudan Economy
- South Sudan Banks
