= Renk, South Sudan =

Renk County (Arang) Dinka Abialang
- Town
- Nickname: Wun Arang Coum
- Location in South Sudan
- Coordinates: 11.8300°N 32.8000°E
- Country: South Sudan
- Region: Greater Upper Nile
- State: Upper Nile
- County: Renk County

Population (2017)
  - Total: 198,123
- Time zone: UTC+2 (CAT)

Renk is a town in northern South Sudan, in Upper Nile State.

== Location ==
Renk is located in the Renk County of Upper Nile State, in the Greater Upper Nile region of South Sudan, close to the International border with the Republic of Sudan. Its location lies approximately 970 kilometres (600 mi), by road, north of Juba, the capital and largest city in that country. The geographical coordinates of Renk are: Latitude: 11.8300; Longitude: 32.8000.

== Overview ==
Renk is a small but growing town, that lies on the eastern banks of the White Nile River. With the attainment of independence by South Sudan on 9 July 2011, the town is poised to grow in size and economic significance, in the years to come.

== Climate ==
Climate data for Renk, South Sudan (1961–1990)
Month	Jan	Feb	Mar	Apr	May	Jun	Jul	Aug	Sep	Oct	Nov	Dec	Year
Record high °C (°F)	42.2 (108.0)	43.3 (109.9)	47.3 (117.1)	45.6 (114.1)	44.7 (112.5)	40.0 (104.0)	40.2 (104.4)	38.5 (101.3)	40.0 (104.0)	41.6 (106.9)	41.6 (106.9)	41.3 (106.3)	47.3 (117.1)
Mean daily maximum °C (°F)	32.6 (90.7)	35.0 (95.0)	38.6 (101.5)	40.5 (104.9)	39.1 (102.4)	36.0 (96.8)	33.0 (91.4)	32.2 (90.0)	33.5 (92.3)	36.1 (97.0)	35.9 (96.6)	33.2 (91.8)	35.5 (95.9)
Daily mean °C (°F)	23.9 (75.0)	25.5 (77.9)	29.3 (84.7)	31.4 (88.5)	31.7 (89.1)	29.7 (85.5)	27.7 (81.9)	27.3 (81.1)	27.7 (81.9)	28.9 (84.0)	27.7 (81.9)	25.0 (77.0)	28.0 (82.4)
Mean daily minimum °C (°F)	15.3 (59.5)	15.9 (60.6)	19.9 (67.8)	22.3 (72.1)	24.3 (75.7)	23.3 (73.9)	22.3 (72.1)	22.4 (72.3)	21.9 (71.4)	21.7 (71.1)	19.6 (67.3)	16.8 (62.2)	20.5 (68.9)
Record low °C (°F)	10.4 (50.7)	9.9 (49.8)	12.4 (54.3)	13.8 (56.8)	17.0 (62.6)	18.0 (64.4)	16.5 (61.7)	15.1 (59.2)	17.0 (62.6)	12.9 (55.2)	11.0 (51.8)	7.6 (45.7)	7.6 (45.7)
Average precipitation mm (inches)	0.0 (0.0)	0.0 (0.0)	0.8 (0.03)	3.3 (0.13)	32.1 (1.26)	75.4 (2.97)	119.2 (4.69)	105.4 (4.15)	92.6 (3.65)	44.2 (1.74)	2.2 (0.09)	0.0 (0.0)	475.2 (18.71)
Average precipitation days (≥ 0.1 mm)	0.0	0.0	0.3	0.6	3.0	6.5	9.7	9.9	7.5	4.0	0.3	0.0	41.8
Average relative humidity (%)	35	31	25	26	38	50	65	69	65	53	36	36	44.1
Mean monthly sunshine hours	297.6	268.8	282.1	282.0	263.5	195.0	167.4	176.7	192.0	254.2	291.0	294.5	2,964.8
Percentage possible sunshine	84	82	76	76	68	51	43	46	53	70	84	83	68
Source: NOAA

== Population ==
In the 2017, the population of the town was about 198,124

== Transportation ==
There is one main road that goes through town. Towards the south, it leads, after passing through several smaller towns, to the city of Malakal, in Upper Nile State, South Sudan. Towards the north, the road leads to the twin cities of Rabak and Kosti in White Nile State, in the Republic of Sudan. Renk is also served by Renk Airport.

== Economy ==
The economy of Renk and surrounding Renk County is primarily dependent on subsistence agriculture and nomadic animal husbandry. However, seismic studies have identified significant petroleum deposits in Renk County and other areas of Upper Nile State. The maximum exploitation of these deposits is yet to be achieved. Renk is mass agricultural, and makes about 35% gum (Arabic) internationally, and more than 80% of sourgum and simsim in all South Sudan.

== Points of interest ==
The following points of interest are found in or near Renk:

- The offices of Renk Town Council
- The headquarters of Renk County Administration
- Sudan-South Sudan Border Crossing
- The Malakal–Rabak Road – passes through town north to south
- The White Nile – The town of Renk lies on the eastern bank of the river.
- Renk Airport – Civilian airport serving the town ad neighboring communities
- A branch of Ivory Bank
- A branch of Nile Commercial Bank
- A branch of Upper Nile University

== See also ==
- Renk Airport
- Upper Nile (state)
- Greater Upper Nile
