= Nile Commercial Bank =

Bank of South Sudan

- Type: Private company
- Industry: Banking
- Founded: 2003
- Headquarters: Juba, South Sudan
- Key people: Leonard Logo Malawat (Chairman); Aggrrey Idri (Managing Director)
- Products: Loans, Checking, Savings, Investments,
- Website: web.archive.org/web/20110716112548/http://www.southern-sudan.com/nilebank.htm

The Nile Commercial Bank (NCB) is a commercial bank in South Sudan. It is one of the commercial banks licensed to operate in South Sudan, by the Bank of South Sudan, the national banking regulator.

The bank is an indigenous South Sudanese commercial bank. Of all the commercial banks licensed in South Sudan, it has the largest number of branches at 20. The bank is affiliated with Stanbic Bank, a division of Standard Bank of South Africa.

== History ==
The bank was started in 2003 by South Sudanese individuals. The number of investors in the bank grew to exceed 1,700 individuals and the banks branch network grew to over twenty.

In April 2009, it was reported that the bank had run out of cash, as a result of non-performing loans made to officials in the Government of South Sudan (GOSS). The bank was temporarily closed in 2009 while the bad loans were being recovered. In September 2009, Nile Commercial Bank received a capital injection of 102 million Sudanese Pounds (approximately US$44 million) by the Government of South Sudan and by the Bank of South Sudan.

== Branch network ==
As of November 2011, Nile Commercial Bank maintains branches at the following locations, among others:

1. Main Branch - Juba
2. Malakal Branch - Malakal
3. Renk Branch - Renk
4. Rumbek Branch - Rumbek
5. Torit Branch - Torit
6. Aweil Branch - Aweil
7. Bentiu Branch - Bentiu

== See also ==
- List of banks in South Sudan
- Bank of South Sudan
- Economy of South Sudan
