= Southern Sudan Beverages Limited =

Former brewery in South Sudan

Southern Sudan Beverages Going up
- Type: Private Subsidiary
- Industry: Brewing, Beverage
- Founded: 2009
- Headquarters: Juba, South Sudan
- Key people: Ashir Mori- CM
- Products: Beer, Wines and Spirits
- Parent: SABMiller
- Website: SSBL on SABMiller

Southern Sudan Beverages Limited was a brewery based in South Sudan and previously owned by ABInBev. The company closed operations in 2016.

== History ==
SABMiller has an investment in the company while it was within the jurisdiction of Sudan. It built a ~£32 million factory in Juba, making it the first manufacturing facility in the country and came despite competition from imported beers from Kenya and Uganda.

The initial plans to start a brewery had begun in 2006 before the launch in 2009. The company's initial challenges included logistics as material to build the first factory needed to be driven into the country from Mombasa, Kenya including two second hand brewery machines from Malta and Bulgaria and a power plant needed to be built, while the only ingredient of beer available was local water from the Nile and the over 250 workers who had mostly never been employed before needed to be trained from scratch.

The malted barley, hops and yeast are imported but there were plans to work with local farmers to start brewing with cassava. The factory has a capacity to produce 180,000hl of clear beer and 60,000hl of carbonated soft drinks annually. The flagship White Bull's colours are yellow, green and white and are served in heavy brown bottles. It is also illegally available in Khartoum, Sudan. Production started in May 2009. Ian Alsworth-Elvey is the inaugural managing director of the company. A new managing director, Carlos Gomes was appointed to take over the business in March 2015.

This was, however, not the first attempt to build a brewery in the country after Belgium's SYBETRA built the White Nile Brewery in Wau in 1983, but the Sudanese government did not license the project due to sharia law.

On 14 January 2016, the company had announced it would be closing its brewing operations in South Sudan by mid-February due to the foreign-currency shortage restricting its ability to import raw materials.

In 2022 Life Industries which previously produced bottled water opened a brewery in Juba. The company has a range of beers of varying strengths including South Beer.

== Brands ==
The beer brands that were manufactured are White Bull, Nile Special (brewed primarily in Jinja, Uganda but also at the South Sudan brewery) and Club Pilsner pale lager beer. The company also produces soft drinks such as Club Cola, Club Berry, Club Lemmon, Club Pineapple, Club Orange, and Club Apple . In addition to soft dinks and beer, the company also produces spirits such as Konyagi Gin, Vladimir Vodka, Regency Whisky and Valeur Brandy.

=== White Bull Lager ===
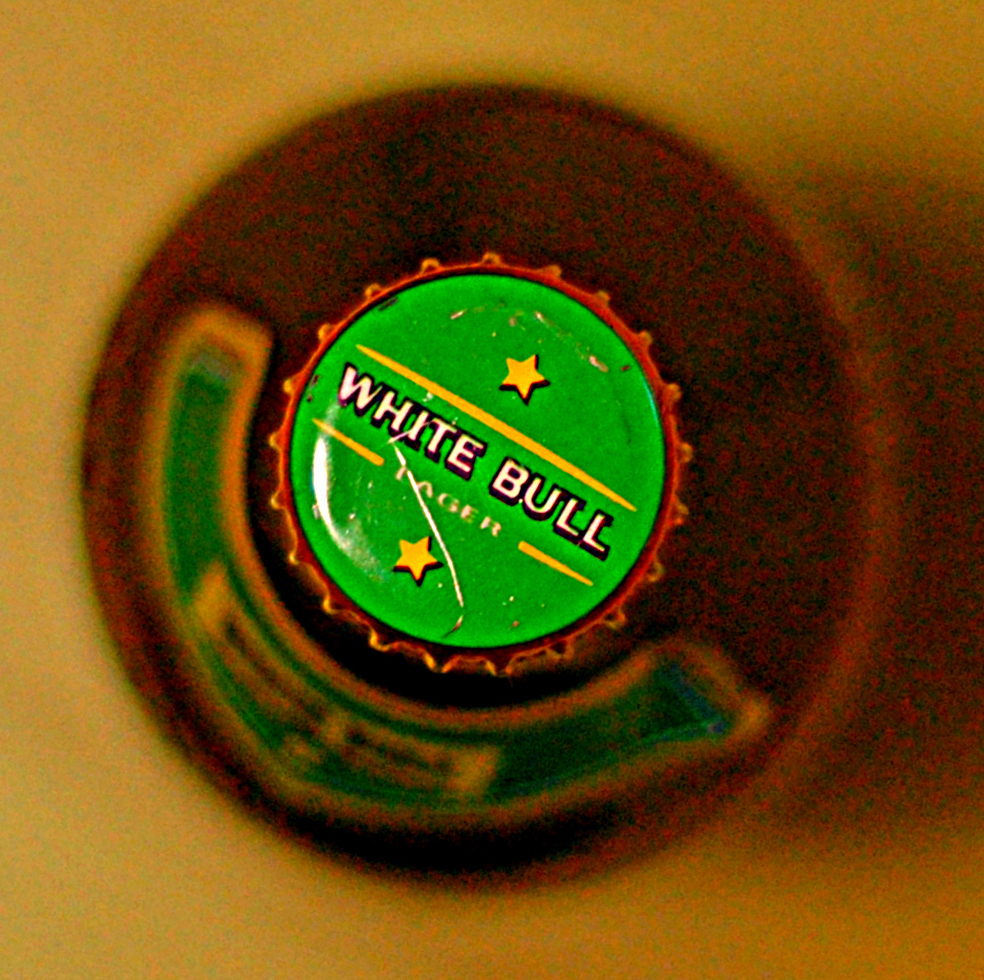
A White Bull bottle

Southern Sudan Beverages Ltd. announced on 6 May 2009; that the company had produced its first locally produced beer in South Sudan, called White Bull Lager with an alcohol content level of 4.2%. The beer has been brewing in the Juba brewing facility, which SSBL invested US$37 million in 2009 that has an initial annual capacity of 180000hl. The White Bull name comes from the distinctive cattle in the country which, according to the company, "is an important culturally treasured symbol status that the team at SSBL respects and admires." Since the brands inception, WB is considered to be the national beer of South Sudan.

The brewery planned to produce 35 million litres a year. Bulk purchases are sold at Sudanese pounds per crate except for volume buyers – with purchases of 225 crates or more – who will pay about UK£12, while the minimum order is 45 crates.

By 11 May 2010 it was announced White Bull had captured two-thirds of the mainstream beer market, selling 2.5m bottles a month, at 70p each.
