= Renk Airport =

- IATA: n/a; ICAO: HSRN

Summary
- Airport type: Public, Civilian
- Owner: Civil Aviation Authority of South Sudan
- Serves: Renk, South Sudan
- Location: Renk, South Sudan
- Elevation AMSL: 1,280 ft (390 m)
- Coordinates: 11°38′41″N 32°48′38″E

Map
- Location of Renk Airport in South Sudan

Runways
Direction	Length		Surface
Direction	ft	m	Surface
01/19		2,000	Unpaved

Renk Airport (ICAO: HSRN) is an airport serving Renk in South Sudan.

== Location ==
Renk Airport is located in Renk County in Upper Nile State, in the town of Renk, in the Greater Upper Nile Region of South Sudan. The airport is located southwest of the central business district of the town, and lies between Renk and its southern suburb of Abbeit.

== Overview ==
Renk Airport is a small civilian airport that serves the town of Renk and surrounding communities. The airport's runway is unable to accommodate larger planes, so it offers flights that can hold only up to 80 passengers.

== Incidents ==
In 2020 an Antonov An-26 operated by South Sudan Supreme Airlines experienced a runway excursion while landing at Renk. A tire on the plane burst while landing which the pilot blamed on poor runway conditions.

== See also ==
- List of airports in South Sudan
