= Wau railway station =

Railway station in South Sudan

Coordinates: 7.7178°N 27.9826°E

Wau railway station is a railway station located in Wau, South Sudan, just south of the airport. The station is on the Babanusa-Wau Railway, and used to provide services to Sudan a few times a week. As of January 2020, the station building was being used by the South Sudanese police while the tracks around the station were overgrown or covered by sand.

== Land Grabbing ==
On November 6, 2016, The railway station staff sent a petition letter to the State government complaining of military officials grabbing land and settling within the area. The Wau town Mayor Mel Aleu Goc sent warnings saying, "Anyone who had set up structures at the station has done so illegally and is therefore ordered to leave the railway station".

Government officials on Tuesday led by the Minister for Agriculture James Joseph who doubles as the Acting Minister of Physical Infrastructure, Information, and Communication together the Wau town Mayor Mel Aleu, among others visited Wau Railway cooperation station to meet the station workers over the alarming situation.
