= Gulu–Nimule Road =

Road in Uganda and South Sudan

Coordinates: 03°18′N 32°07′E

Route information
- Length: 65 mi (105 km)
- History: Designated in 2012; Completion in 2015

Major junctions
- South end: Gulu
- Pabbo; Atiak; Bibia
- North end: Nimule

Location
- Country: Uganda

Highway system
- Roads in Uganda

Gulu–Nimule Road is a road in the Northern Region of Uganda, connecting the city of Gulu in Gulu District and the town of Nimule in Eastern Equatoria State in South Sudan, just north of the international border between the two countries. The road, known as Highway A104 in Uganda, continues into South Sudan as Highway A43.

== Location ==
The Gulu–Nimule Road starts at Gulu and continues north, through Pabbo, Atiak, Bibia and Elegu, before ending in Nimule at the border between Uganda and South Sudan, a distance of approximately 106 kilometres (66 mi).

== Overview ==
Before 2009, the Gulu–Nimule Road was a gravel-surfaced, two-lane road. It is a major route of transportation between Uganda and South Sudan. During the rainy season, the road became impassable, as was the case in 2008 when rains closed it for a week. In March 2009, the World Bank agreed to fund the engineering design of the improved road to an all-weather tarmac surface. Vice Consulting Engineers, a South African firm, was awarded the contract to design the road at a cost of US$800,000. The government of Japan, through the Japan International Cooperation Agency (JICA), and the World Bank provided the loans to fund the construction, expected to cost US$102 million.

== Construct timeline ==
After several delays, the contract for the Gulu–Atiak section, measuring 70 kilometres (43 mi), was awarded to China Henan International Corporation, a Chinese construction Group that had successfully completed civil engineering projects in various African countries, including Guinea, Liberia, Namibia, Rwanda and Tanzania. The costs for this section of the road was met by the Government of Uganda and the World Bank. Construction began in May 2012 and was expected to last two years. The remaining section of the road, between Atiak and Nimule, measuring 35 kilometres (22 mi), was funded by the Government of Japan. That contract was awarded to China Railway Wuju Group Corporation, a division of China Railway Engineering Corporation. Construction of that section was commissioned in August 2013. Completion was expected in May 2016. On 21 July 2015, Yoweri Museveni, the president of Uganda, officially commissioned the completed road.

== Points of interest ==
The following landmarks lie close or near the Gulu–Nimule Road:

(1) city of Gulu in Gulu District, the largest city in Northern Uganda, (2) the town of Pabbo, in Amuru District, approximately 39 kilometres (24 mi), north of Gulu. (3) the town of Atiak, in Amuru District, approximately 70 kilometres (43 mi), north of Gulu. (4) the town of Bibia, in Amuru District, approximately 100 kilometres (62 mi), north of Gulu. (5) the town of Elegu, in Amuru District. This is the last town in Uganda, before the road reaches the International border between Uganda and South Sudan at Nimule. (6) the town of Nimule, in Equatoria Province, South Sudan, approximately 104 kilometres (65 mi), north of Gulu.

== See also ==
- Transport in Uganda
- List of roads in Uganda
- List of cities and towns in Uganda
