= Renk County =

County in Northern Upper Nile state, South Sudan

Coordinates: 11.3141°N 33.0616°E

Renk (Arang)
- County
- Nickname: Arang Coum
- Interactive map of Renk (Arang)
- Country: South Sudan
- Region: Greater Upper Nile
- State: Upper Nile State
- Headquarters: Renk, South Sudan

Area
  - Total: 10,019 km^{2} (3,868 sq mi)

Population (2017 estimate)
  - Total: 198,123
  - Density: 19.775/km^{2} (51.216/sq mi)
- Time zone: UTC+2 (CAT)

Renk County is an administrative area in Upper Nile State, in the Greater Upper Nile region of South Sudan.
