= Wau, South Sudan =

Wau واو
- City
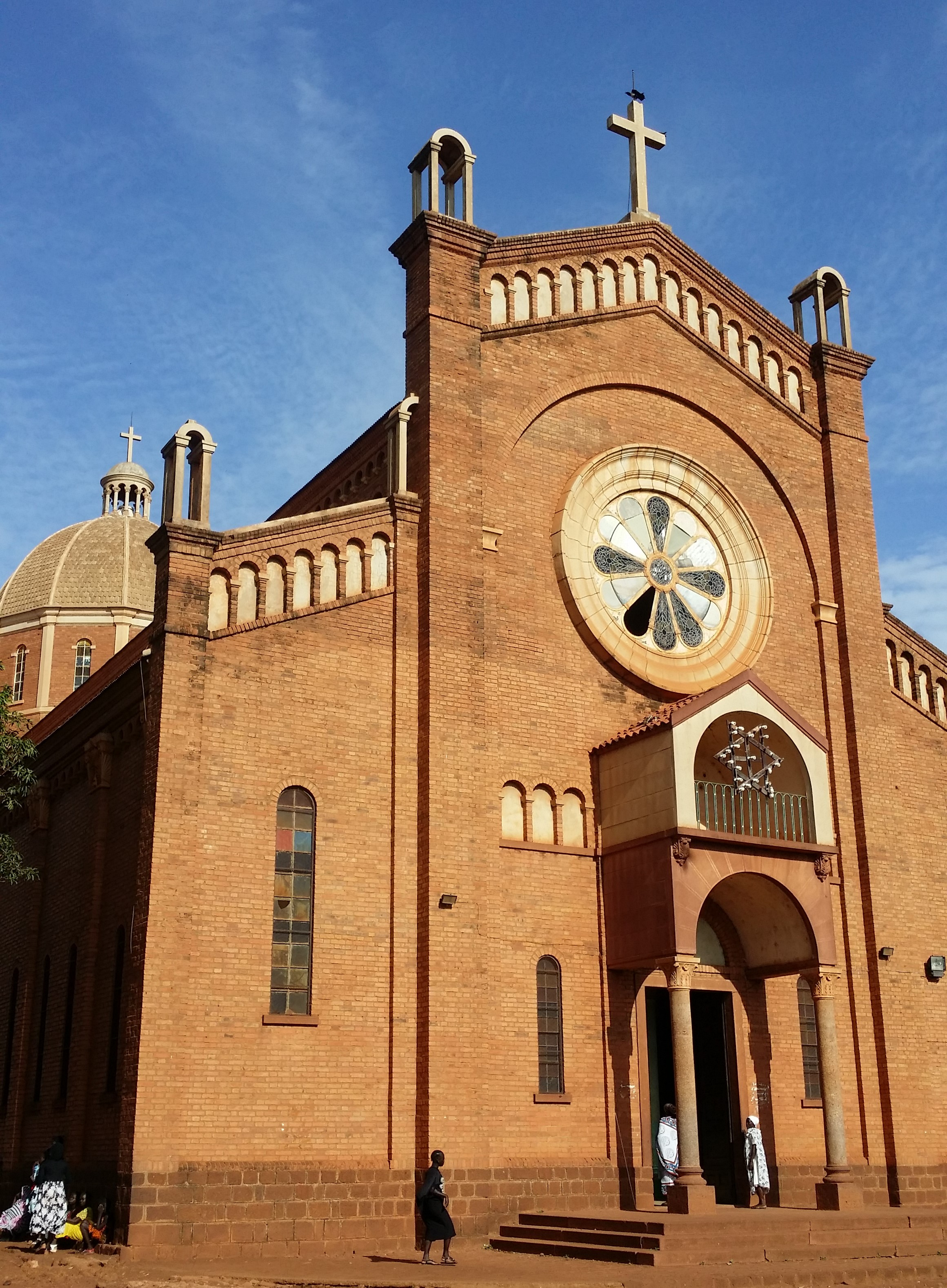
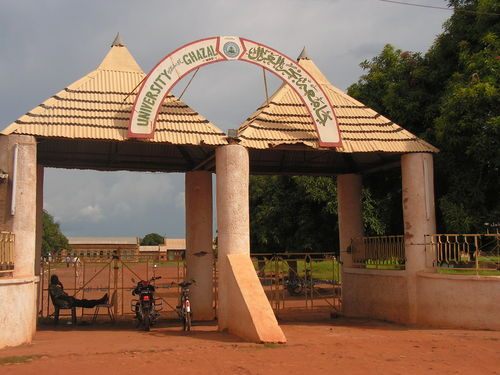
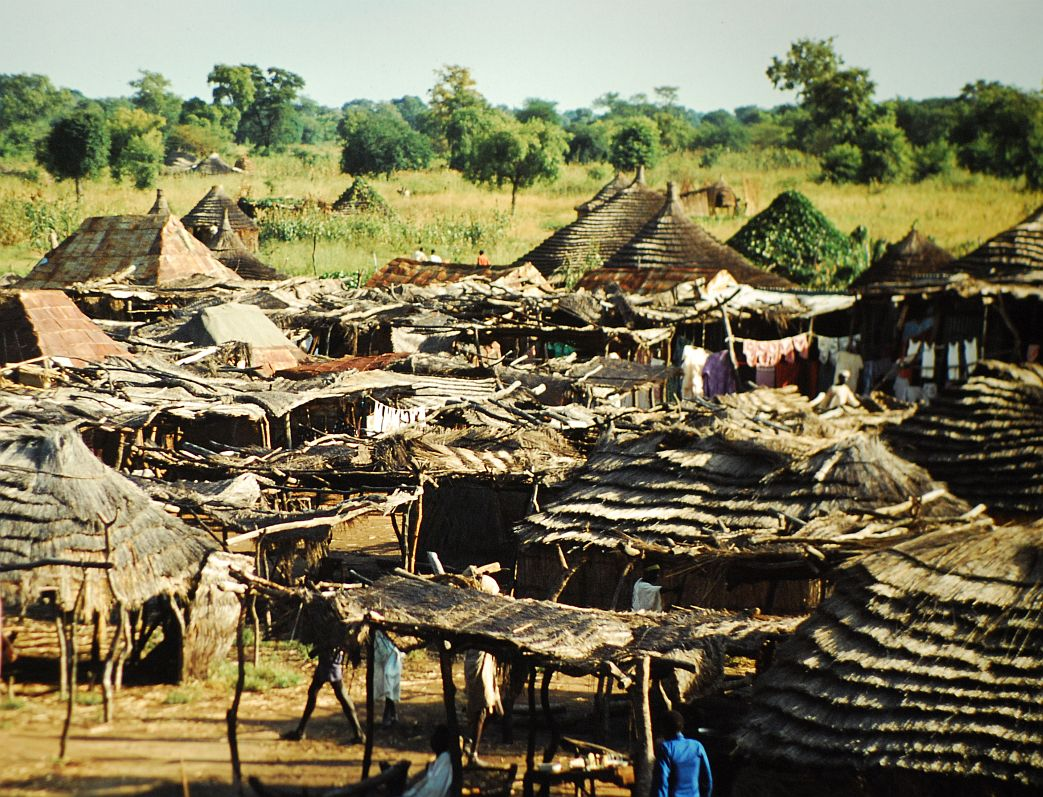
- From top to bottom, left to right: The Cathedral of St. Mary, the University of Bahr El-Ghazal, and traditional huts outside the city.
- Motto(s): Arabic: واو نار, romanized: Wau Naar Wau Nuur Wau Mayi Nom; English: "Wau is Fire, Wau Is Light, Wau Shall Not Sleep"
- Location within South Sudan Location within Africa
- Coordinates: 07°42′00″N 28°00′00″E
- Country: South Sudan
- Region: Bahr el Ghazal
- State: Western Bahr el Ghazal
- County: Wau County
- Elevation: 433 m (1,421 ft)

Population (2022)
  - Total: 320,752
- Time zone: UTC+2 (CAT)

Wau (Arabic: واو, romanized: Wāw; also known as Wau Town Payam) is a town, locally referred to as a city, in northwestern South Sudan on the western bank of the Jur River. It is the capital of Western Bahr el Ghazal region in South Sudan. It lies approximately 650 kilometres (400 mi) northwest of the capital, Juba. It is a diverse small urban center (town) and a trading hub. The city has been a municipality since 2012 and is governed by a mayor whom the state governor usually appoints.

== History ==
Wau was initially established by the French Marchand Mission as Fort Desaix and later was established as a zariba (fortified base) by slave-traders in the 19th century. During the time of condominium rule, the city became an administrative center.

One of the first insurgent Anyanya attacks on the Sudanese Armed Forces (SAF) took place at the Wau barracks in January 1964.

During the Second Sudanese Civil War, Wau remained a SAF garrison town. It was the scene of extensive fighting in the spring of 1998. Battles erupted again in the town in the spring of the 1980s, killing several hundred people. This forced the Dinka in Wau to seek safety on the eastern side of Wau. The Dinka were said to have migrated to the state today known as Warrap.

In 2010, the Ministry of Housing, Physical Planning and Environment proposed to re-make the city into the shape of a giraffe.

=== South Sudanese Civil War ===
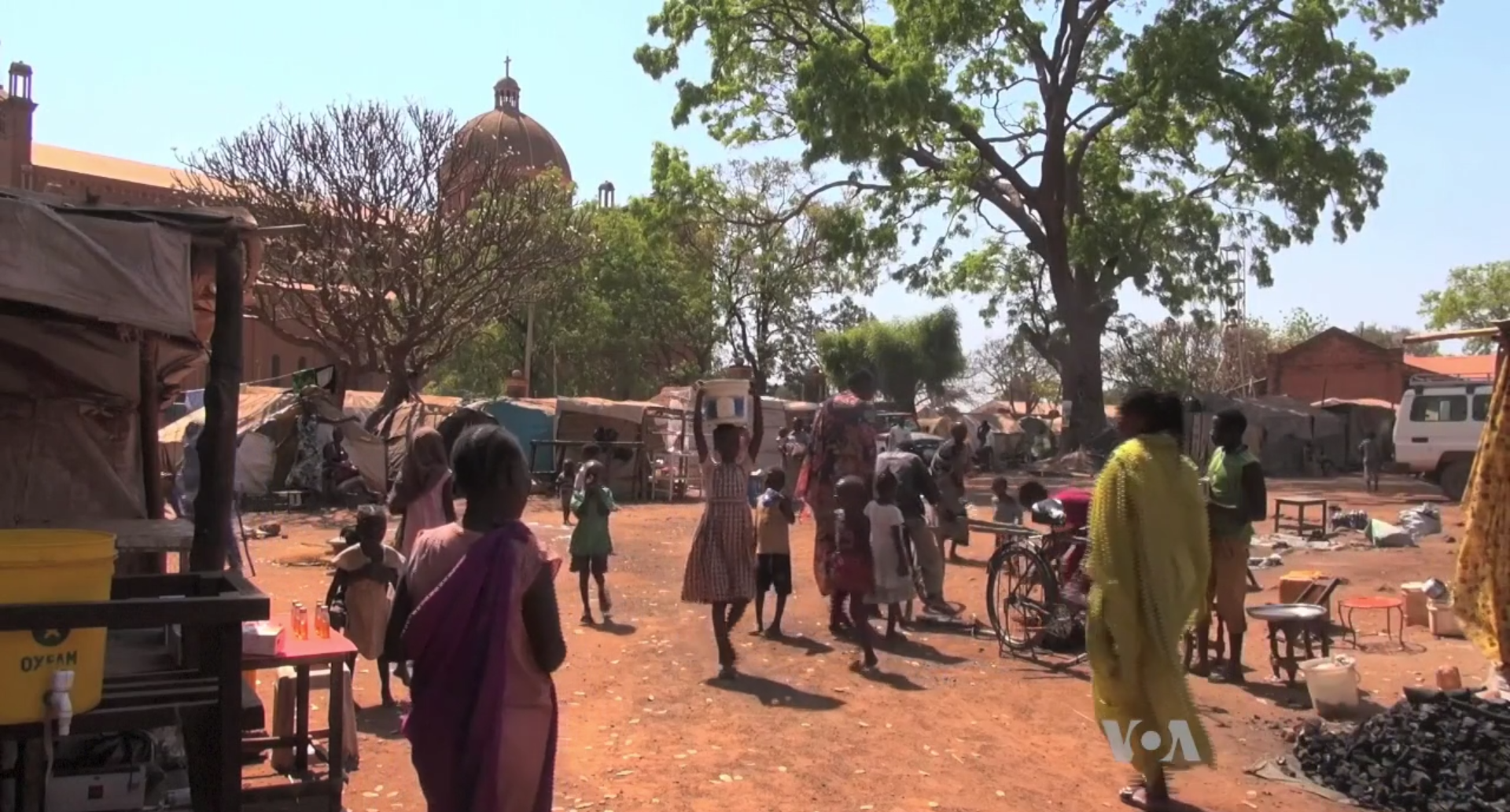
The refugee camp at Wau town's Catholic cathedral, where around 8,500 IDPs found shelter during the 2016–18 Wau clashes

Following the outbreak of the South Sudanese Civil War, the town has experienced numerous clashes, battles, massacres, and much destruction at the hands of anti-government as well as government forces. In April 2014, Nuer soldiers belonging to the local SPLA garrison mutinied after hearing of a massacre at Mapel. They clashed with SPLA loyalists, and then fled into the rural countryside, joining a long march of other deserters to Sudan. About 700 Nuer civilians subsequently sought protection at Wau's UNMISS base; most of them were family members of the deserted soldiers, while others were students.

In 2016, Wau experienced heavy clashes that displaced much of its Fertit population and led to widespread destruction. In April 2017, Dinka soldiers of the SPLA and Mathiang Anyoor militiamen carried out a massacre of non-Dinka civilians in the town, killing up to 50 people, and displacing thousands.

== Population ==
The population of Wau is ethnically diverse. Most of the inhabitants are Luo and Fertit, as the town lies on the tribal boundary between these two peoples. Furthermore, minorities belonging to the Dinka of Marial Baai, peoples can be found in Wau. Due to its diversity, Wau has repeatedly suffered from ethnic violence.

=== Demographics ===
In 2008, Wau was the third-largest city in South Sudan, by population, behind the national capital Juba and Malakal, in Upper Nile State. At that time, the estimated population of the city of Wau was about 128,100. In 2011, the city's population was estimated at 151,320.

Year	Population
1973	52,800
1983	58,000
1993	84,000
2010	128,100
2011	151,320

=== Religion ===
The Cathedral of St. Mary (built 1905, before the erection of the former Apostolic Prefecture of Bahr el-Ghazal) is the episcopal see of the Roman Catholic Diocese of Wau, which serves the province's religious majority.

== Economy ==
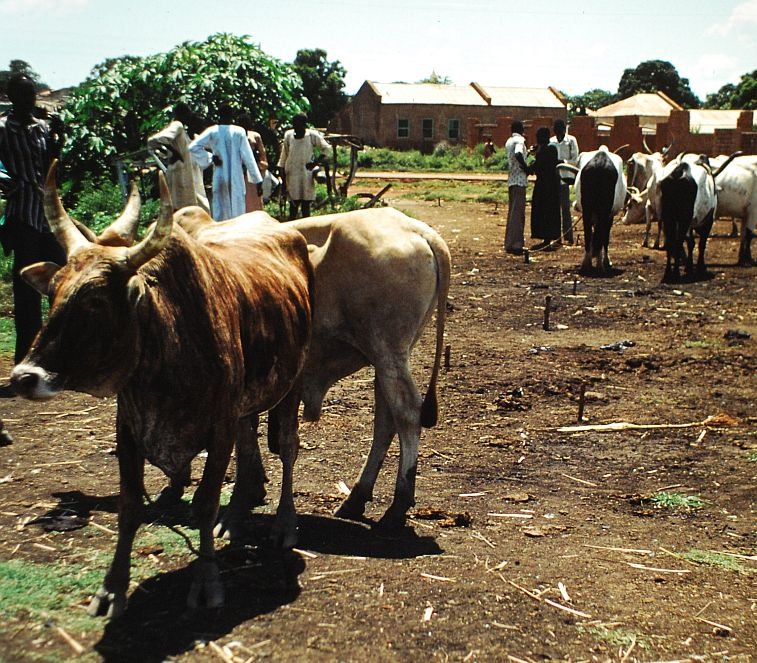
Wau cattle market, 2008

Wau is a vibrant economic center by the standards of the newly established Republic of South Sudan, and serves as a hub for trade between Darfur, Bahr al Ghazal, and Equatoria. The major contributors to the local economy include:

- Buffalo Commercial Bank branch
- Equity Bank branch
- Ivory Bank branch
- Kenya Commercial Bank branch
- Catholic University of South Sudan, Wau campus
- University of Bahr El-Ghazal
- Wau Airport
- Wau County Government
- Wau state Government
- RCS - Radio & Satellite Communication
- Commercial Bank of Ethiopia (South Sudan Subsidiary Comp.) expected shortly

=== Transport and infrastructure ===
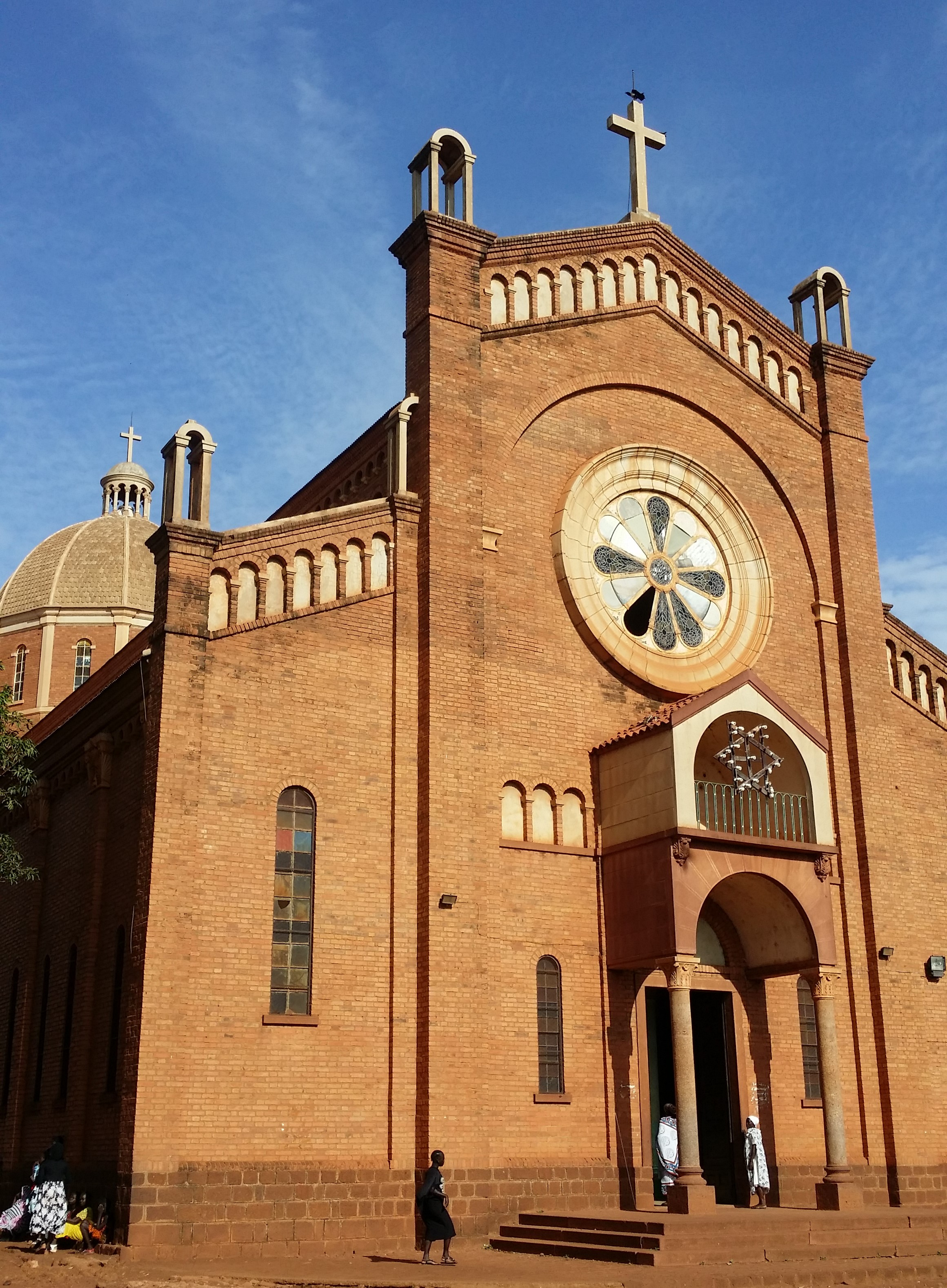
St Mary Cathedral in Wau

- Wau Railway Station is the terminus of a narrow gauge branch line of the Sudan Railways. A plan exists, as of 2008, to open a standard gauge line north from Gulu in Uganda to Wau. Trains from Khartoum to Mombasa would be possible only if one of the lines were regauged. Its functionality would depend on post-conflict reconstruction.
- Wau Airport (IATA: WUU, ICAO: HSWW) has a single paved runway which measures 2,500 metres (8,200 ft) in length.
- The city hosts University of Bahr El-Ghazal and many secondary and primary schools.
- The Catholic University of South Sudan maintains a campus in the city.
- Wau Stadium is a soccer stadium in the middle of town
- The Cathedral of St. Mary in Wau was built between 1951 and 1956.
- There are five main roads out of town:
  - B38-North leads directly north to Gogrial, South Sudan.
  - B43-South leads southeast to Tonj, South Sudan.
  - A44-South leads directly south to Tumbura, South Sudan.
  - B41-West leads west to Raga, South Sudan.
  - B43-North leads northwest to Aweil, South Sudan.
- Southern National Park is located about 100 kilometres (62 mi), by road, south of Wau along A44-South.

== Geography and climate ==
Like other parts of South Sudan and the East Sudanian savanna, Wau has a tropical savanna climate (Köppen Aw), with a wet season and a dry season, and the temperature is hot year-round. The average annual mean temperature is 27.8 °C (82.0 °F), the average annual high temperature is 34.7 °C (94.5 °F), and the average annual low temperature is 20.9 °C (69.6 °F). The hottest time of year is from March to May, just before the wet season starts. March is the hottest month, having the highest average high at 38.1 °C (100.6 °F) and the highest mean at 30.4 °C (86.7 °F). April has the highest average low at 23.8 °C (74.8 °F). August and July have the lowest average high at 31.4 °C (88.5 °F), with August having the lowest mean at 26.2 °C (79.2 °F). December has the lowest average low at 17.9 °C (64.2 °F).

Wau receives 1,074.5 millimetres (42.30 in) of rain over 102.4 precipitation days, with a distinct wet and dry season like most tropical savanna climates. Almost no rain falls from November to March. August, the wettest month, receives 192.3 millimetres (7.57 in) of rainfall on average. September has 23.7 precipitation days, which is the most of any month. Humidity is much higher in the wet season than in the dry season, with February having a humidity of just 26% and August having a humidity of 77%. Wau receives 2777 hours of sunshine annually on average, with the sunshine being distributed fairly evenly across the year, although it is lower during the wet season. December receives the most sunshine, while July receives the least.

Climate data for Wau, South Sudan
Month	Jan	Feb	Mar	Apr	May	Jun	Jul	Aug	Sep	Oct	Nov	Dec	Year
Record high °C (°F)	41.1 (106.0)	42.2 (108.0)	43.5 (110.3)	42.0 (107.6)	41.5 (106.7)	38.5 (101.3)	36.5 (97.7)	36.7 (98.1)	40.0 (104.0)	39.2 (102.6)	38.5 (101.3)	39.5 (103.1)	43.5 (110.3)
Mean daily maximum °C (°F)	35.5 (95.9)	37.1 (98.8)	38.1 (100.6)	37.4 (99.3)	35.3 (95.5)	32.9 (91.2)	31.4 (88.5)	31.4 (88.5)	32.6 (90.7)	33.8 (92.8)	35.2 (95.4)	35.2 (95.4)	34.7 (94.5)
Daily mean °C (°F)	26.8 (80.2)	28.5 (83.3)	30.4 (86.7)	30.6 (87.1)	29.3 (84.7)	27.5 (81.5)	26.3 (79.3)	26.2 (79.2)	26.8 (80.2)	27.4 (81.3)	27.4 (81.3)	26.5 (79.7)	27.8 (82.0)
Mean daily minimum °C (°F)	19.1 (66.4)	19.9 (67.8)	22.7 (72.9)	23.8 (74.8)	23.2 (73.8)	22.0 (71.6)	21.2 (70.2)	21.0 (69.8)	21.0 (69.8)	21.0 (69.8)	19.6 (67.3)	17.9 (64.2)	20.9 (69.6)
Record low °C (°F)	9.3 (48.7)	12.5 (54.5)	14.9 (58.8)	16.5 (61.7)	19.5 (67.1)	17.7 (63.9)	18.0 (64.4)	18.6 (65.5)	17.0 (62.6)	16.4 (61.5)	11.4 (52.5)	10.3 (50.5)	9.3 (48.7)
Average precipitation mm (inches)	1.3 (0.05)	3.6 (0.14)	18.6 (0.73)	68.3 (2.69)	118.8 (4.68)	177.4 (6.98)	176.0 (6.93)	192.3 (7.57)	179.4 (7.06)	123.8 (4.87)	14.9 (0.59)	0.1 (0.00)	1,074.5 (42.30)
Average precipitation days (≥ 0.1 mm)	0.2	0.3	3.4	6.3	11.4	12.7	15.9	15.5	23.7	11.2	1.7	0.1	102.4
Average relative humidity (%)	29	26	35	48	62	71	76	77	74	69	48	35	54
Mean monthly sunshine hours	288.3	246.4	229.4	228.0	220.1	204.0	182.9	192.2	204.0	223.2	264.0	294.5	2,777
Mean daily sunshine hours	9.3	8.8	7.4	7.6	7.1	6.8	5.9	6.2	6.8	7.2	8.8	9.5	7.6
Percentage possible sunshine	79	74	62	61	60	54	47	50	56	60	75	82	63
Source: NOAA

== Notable people ==
- Victoria Adhar Arop - member of the National Legislative Assembly and brigadier general
- Luol Deng - former NBA basketball player
- Thon Maker - former NBA basketball player
- Mari Malek - model, DJ and activist
- Joseph Ukel - veteran politician
- Alek Wek - South Sudanese-British model and designer

== Bibliography ==
- PSI South Sudan; Western Bahr el Ghazal State Ministry of Health; Wau County Health Department; Western Bahr el Ghazal Relief and Rehabilitation Commission (2014). Pre-Harvest Anthropometric and Mortality Survey. Wau County, Western Bahr El Ghazal, South Sudan (PDF). Washington, D.C.: Population Services International.
- The Conflict in Northern and Western Bahrel Ghazal States (PDF). Geneva: Small Arms Survey. 16 October 2014. Archived from the original (PDF) on 7 June 2021.
- Essays, UK (November 2018). "Sample Undergraduate 1st Education Essay". Nottingham, UK: UKEssays.com.
