= Nimule =

- City
- Location in South Sudan
- Coordinates: 03°35′46″N 32°03′49″E
- Country: South Sudan
- Region: Equatoria
- State: Eastern Equatoria
- County: Magwi County
- Elevation: 2,460 ft (750 m)

Population (2006 Estimate)
  - Total: 45,000
- Time zone: UTC+2 (CAT)

Nimule is a city in the southern part of South Sudan in Magwi County, Eastern Equatoria. It lies approximately 197 kilometres (122 mi), by road, southeast of Juba, the capital of South Sudan and largest city in the country. The town also lies approximately 120 kilometres (75 mi), by road, north of Gulu, Uganda, the nearest large city.

== Overview and history ==
In 1901, Nimule was the base for a British punitive expedition against the Lango, which had raided neighboring districts. The Lango had been supported by Sudanese mutineers, who were all captured or killed by the British force.

On 19 August 2013, the South Sudanese parliament decided to upgrade Nimule Town to City Council status, administered by a City Clerk. Some in the county have protested, calling for wider consultations.

On April 7, 2014, the Mountain Trade and Development Bank expanded into the Eastern Equatoria state by opening a new branch in the town of Nimule.

On October 6, 2017; Uganda had pledged to supply power to two South Sudanese border towns as part of the Eastern Africa Power Pool agreement; that calls on all member states to connect electricity to each other. Uganda's energy minister Simon D'Ujanga said "400 kilo-volts of power will be supplied to the towns of Kaya and Nimule to boost socio-economic activities in the border areas."

== Population ==
The population of Nimule was estimated at 45,000 in 2006. The current population is not publicly known, as of December 2014.

== Climatic change ==
Nimule is situated in the Eastern part of South Sudan. It is one of the states in South Sudan which is hindered by climatic change. During rainy season it's affected by too much water which sometimes leads to flooding in some parts of the state.

== One stop border post ==
In February 2020, the one stop border post (OSBP) on the Nimule side of the border was officially opened for business. The OSBP was built at a cost of US$5 million with financing from Trademark East Africa. The OSBP on the Ugandan side at Elegu was completed earlier and was commissioned in November 2018. During the calendar year ending December 2019, South Sudan imported goods worth US$364 million from Uganda.

== Economy ==
Commercial bank branches:

- A branch of Equity Bank South Sudan Limited
- A branch of Kenya Commercial Bank South Sudan Limited
- A branch of Mountain Trade and Development Bank
- A branch of Cooperative Bank of South Sudan.

== Transportation and infrastructure ==
- Juba-Nimule Road - 119 mile road, that connects Juba to Numule SS Highway A43.
- Gulu–Nimule Road - 65 mile road, that connects Highway A104 in Uganda with South Sudan Highway A43.
- Nimule Airport - The airport, (IATA: N/A, ICAO: HSNM) has a single unpaved runway which measures 1,188 metres (3,898 ft) in length.
- Nimule National Park - The national park is located just outside town, to the north and to the east.

=== Proposed improvements ===
- Rail Extension - In 2007, there were new proposals for a standard gauge rail link between Uganda and South Sudan passing through Nimule.

=== Accidents ===
1. On 7 October 2006, a heavy truck with Ugandan registration UAD 720U from Uganda, carrying cement caused several spans on one of the two carriageways of the bridge to collapse into the river.
2. On Friday, 17 June 2011, two Ugandan buses, one traveling to Juba from Nimule and the other traveling in the opposite direction, collided head-on, in Pajili Village, about 40 kilometres (25 mi), north of Nimule, killing at least 28 people and injuring at least 65 others. A joint investigation by the South Sudanese and Ugandan authorities, cited (a) overloading (b) speeding and (c) driver fatigue as factors in the collision.
3. On Monday, 29 September 2014, a passenger bus traveling from Juba crashed head-on with a truck-trailer carrying merchandise from Uganda to Juba. The accident, which occurred at about 7.00 AM, killed about 60 people and injured 13 others. Eyewitnesses stated that the truck was traveling on the wrong side of the road.

== Points of interest ==
The following points of interest are located in or near Nimule:

- The offices of Nimule Town Council
- Cornerstone Children's Home, Cornerstone Academy and Cornerstone Clinic - Programs run by Fula Lifeline International, a non-profit NGO.
- Merlin Hospital Nimule - A private, non-profit hospital, owned and operated by Medical Emergency Relief International (Merlin), an NGO
- Nimule Airport - A public, civilian and military airport
- The International border between South Sudan and the Republic of Uganda
- The Gulu-Juba Highway - As of December 2014, the 320 kilometres (200 mi) highway is murram. Arrangements to convert the highway to bitumen surface are underway in both countries.
- Nimule National Park - The national park is located just outside town, to the north and to the east.
- The Leadership Academy of South Sudan (LASS) is located on the eastern outskirts of Nimule town.

== Notable people ==
- James Moga

== See also ==
- Railway stations in South Sudan
- Transport in South Sudan
