= Amuru District =

- District
- District location in Uganda
- Coordinates: 02°50′N 33°05′E
- Country: Uganda
- Region: Northern Uganda
- Sub-region: Acholi sub-region
- Capital: Amuru

Area
  - Total: 3,625.9 km^{2} (1,400.0 sq mi)

Population (2012 Estimate)
  - Total: 178,800
  - Density: 49.3/km^{2} (128/sq mi)
- Time zone: UTC+3 (EAT)
- Website: www.amuru.go.ug

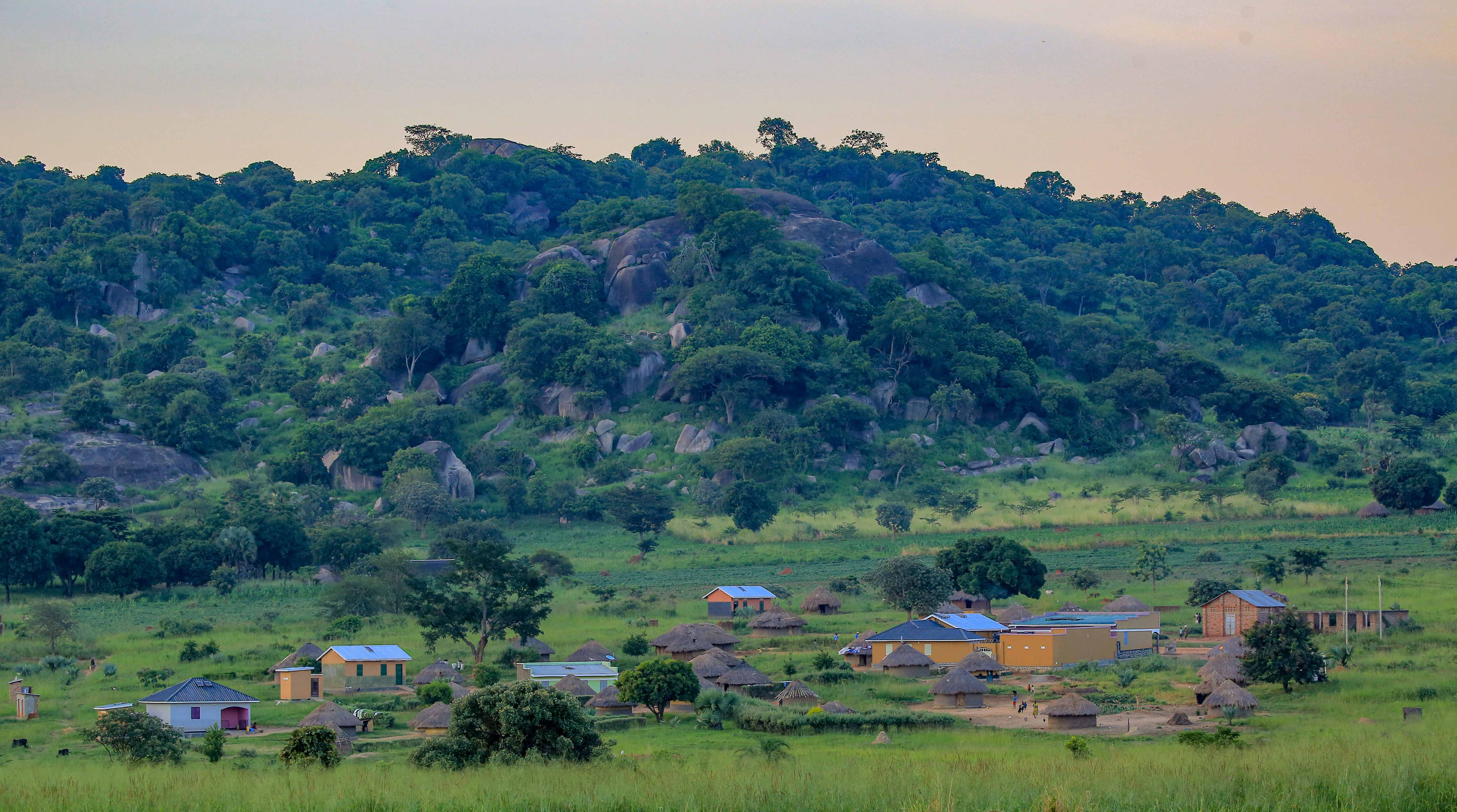
Guru Guru Hill in Amuru

Amuru District is a district in Northern Uganda. Like most Ugandan districts, it is named after its 'chief town', Amuru, where the district headquarters are located.

== Location ==
Amuru District is bordered by Adjumani District to the north, South Sudan and Lamwo District to the northeast, Gulu District to the east, Nwoya District to the south, Nebbi District to the southwest and Arua District to the west. The administrative headquarters of the district at Amuru lies 60 kilometres (37 mi) northwest of Gulu, the largest city in the sub-region.

== Overview ==
Amuru District was established by the Ugandan Parliament in 2006. The district was previously part of Gulu District. Amuru District, together with Agago District, Gulu District, Kitgum District, Lamwo District, Nwoya District and Pader District, is part of the larger Acholi sub-region, home to an estimated 1.5 million Acholi people, according to the 2002 national census. The district is a predominantly rural district, lacking any tarmac road, despite its size.

== Population ==
The 1991 national population census estimated the district population at about 88,700. The 2002 national census estimated the population of Amuru District to be about 135,700. The district population grew at an annual rate of 2.8% between 2002 and 2012. It is estimated that the population of the district in 2012 was approximately 178,800.

== Economic activities ==
Subsistence agriculture is the backbone of the district economy, employing 98% of the population. Arable land, which makes up about 90% of the total land area in the district is very fertile. However, during the last twenty years, less than 1% of the land was utilized for agriculture on account of insecurity caused by the Lord's Resistance Army. With the return of security to Northern Uganda in 2006, the situation in the district is expected to improve. Crops raised include:

- Cotton
- Tobacco
- Maize
- Millet
- Sorghum
- Sweet potatoes
- Cassava
- Simsim
- Beans
- Peas
- Sunflower
- Upland Rice
- Groundnuts

== Livestocks ==
- Cattle
- Goat
- Chicken

== See also ==
- Amuru
- Acholi sub-region
- Acholi people
- Districts of Uganda
