= Economy of South Sudan =

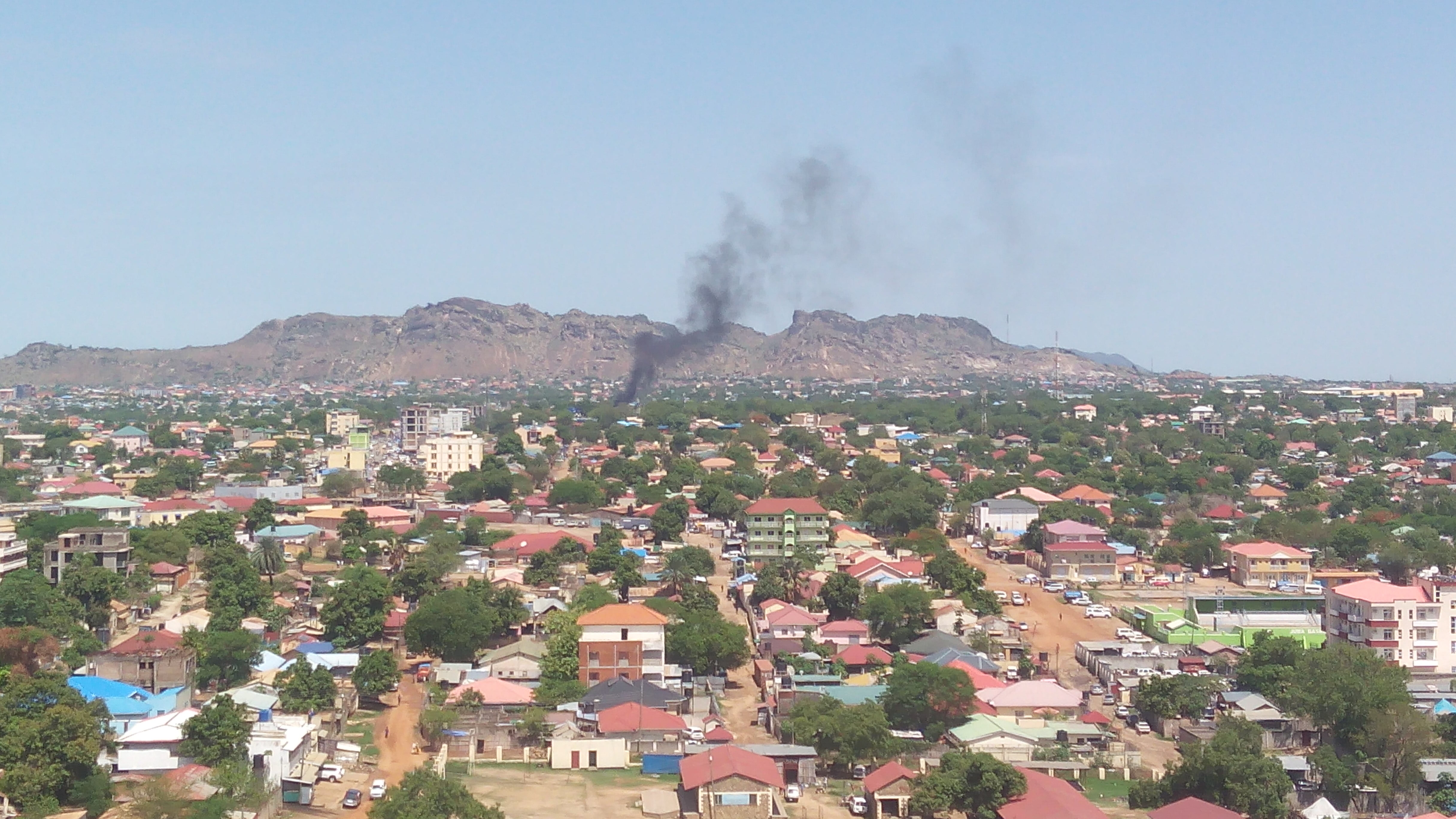
- Juba, the economic center of South Sudan
- Currency: South Sudanese pound (SSP, £)
- Trade organisations: AU, AfCFTA (signed), EAC, IGAD, WTO (observer)
- Country group: Least Developed; Low-income economy

Statistics
- Population: ▲15,787,000 (2025)
- GDP: ▲$6.03 billion (nominal, 2026); ▲$18.88 billion (PPP, 2026)
- GDP rank: 170th (nominal, 2026); 155th (PPP, 2026)
- GDP growth: 4.1% (2026f)
- GDP per capita: ▲$369 (nominal, 2026); ▲$1,154 (PPP, 2026)
- GDP per capita rank: 188th (nominal, 2026); 188th (PPP, 2026)
- GDP per capita growth: -9.8% (2015)
- Inflation (CPI): 65.7% (2025f)
- Population below national poverty line: 76%; 42.9% on less than $1.90/day (2009)
- Gini coefficient: 45.5 medium (2013)
- Human Development Index: ▲0.388 low (2023) (193st); ▼0.226 low IHDI (2023)
- Labour force: ▲5,091,342 (2023)

External
- Exports: $4.499 billion (2023)
- Main export partners: China 50.2%; Singapore 28.7%; UAE 9.5% (2023)
- Imports: $4.499 billion (2016 est.)
- Main import partners: Uganda 33.2%; UAE 25.6%; Kenya 14%; China 9.91% (2023)
- Current account: ▲$577.9 million (2023 est.)

Public finance
- Government debt: ▼62.7% of GDP (2017 est.)
- Foreign reserves: $72.881 million (31 December 2023 est.)
- Budget balance: −1.3% (of GDP) (FY2017/18 est.)
- Revenue: 259.6 million (FY2017/18 est.)
- Spending: 298.6 million (FY2017/18 est.)
- All values, unless otherwise stated, are in US dollars.

South Sudan has a developing economy that is considered low-income and highly dependent on its energy sector. The nation became the world's newest as Africa's 55th state in 2011, which sparked an extended civil war in 2013, lasting until 2018. This armed conflict undermined economic development achieved since independence, making humanitarian work difficult to conduct within the country. The economy has faced stagnation and political instability since the 2020s with widespread poverty.

The South Sudanese economy generates $6.03 billion by nominal gross domestic product (GDP) as of 2026. It is one of the most oil dependent economies in the world, with nearly 80% of GDP linked to the oil industry. It has fertile agricultural land and vast quantities of livestock. The livestock includes over 60 million cattle, sheep and goats. Instability and corruption in the country continue to hinder development. South Sudan is one of the least developed countries with most cities lacking electricity, running water, and insufficient infrastructure, with only 10,000 km (6,200 mi) of paved roads.

== Natural resources ==
South Sudan exports timber to the international market. Some of the states with the best known teak and natural trees for timber are Western Equatoria and Central Equatoria and some parts of Eastern Equatoria like magwi. There are teak plantations located at Kegulu; the other, oldest planted forest reserves are Kawale, Lijo, Loka West, and Nuni. Western Equatoria timber resources include mvuba trees at Zamoi.

One of the major natural features of South Sudan is the River Nile whose many tributaries have sources in the country. The region also contains many natural resources such as petroleum, iron ore, copper, chromium ore, zinc, tungsten, mica, silver, gold in Kapoeta area of Eastern Equatoria, and hydropower. The country's economy, as in many other developing countries, is heavily dependent on agriculture. Some of the agricultural produce include cotton, groundnuts (peanuts), sorghum, millet, wheat, gum arabic, sugarcane, cassava (tapioca), mangos, papaya, maize, simsim, bananas, sweet potatoes, and sesame. Solar power could become important with a solar photovoltaic project on 250,000 m2 of land near Juba expected to be operational by late 2020. The project consists of a 20 MWP photovoltaic park, a 35 megawatt-hour battery storage system and an in-house training center.

=== Oil ===
Oil and gas concessions in Sudan – 2004

Prior to independence, South Sudan produced 85% of Sudanese oil output. The oil revenues according to the Comprehensive Peace Agreement (CPA), were to be split equally for the duration of the agreement period. Since South Sudan relies on pipelines, refineries, and port facilities in Red Sea state in North Sudan, the agreement stated that the government in Khartoum would receive 50% share of all oil revenues. Oil revenues constitute more than 98% of the government of South Sudan's budget according to the southern government's Ministry of Finance and Economic Planning, and this has amounted to more than $8 billion in revenue since the signing of the peace agreement.

In recent years, a significant amount of foreign-based oil drilling has begun in South Sudan, raising the land's geopolitical profile. Oil and other mineral resources can be found throughout South Sudan, but the area around Bentiu is commonly known as being especially rich in oil, while Jonglei, Warrap, and Lakes have potential reserves. During the autonomy years from 2005 to 2011, Khartoum partitioned much of Sudan into blocks, with about 85% of the oil coming from the South. Blocks 1, 2, and 4 are controlled by the largest overseas consortium, the Greater Nile Petroleum Operating Company (GNPOC). GNPOC is composed of the following players: China National Petroleum Corporation (CNPC, People's Republic of China), with a 40% stake; Petronas (Malaysia), with 30%; Oil and Natural Gas Corporation (India), with 25%; and Sudapet of the central Sudan government with 5%.

Due to Sudan's presence on the United States' list of state sponsors of terrorism and Khartoum's insistence upon receiving a share of the profit from any oil deal South Sudan conducts internationally, US oil companies cannot do business with landlocked South Sudan. As such, US companies have virtually no presence in the South Sudanese oil sector.

The other producing blocks in the South are blocks 3 and 7 in eastern Upper Nile state. These blocks are controlled by Petrodar which is 41% owned by CNPC, 40% by Petronas, 8% by Sudapet, 6% by Sinopec Corp and 5% by Al Thani.

Another major block in the South, formerly called Block B by the North Sudanese government, is claimed by several players. Total of France was awarded the concession for the 90,000 square kilometre block in the 1980s but has since done limited work invoking "force majeure". Various elements of the SPLM handed out the block or parts thereof to other parties of South Sudan. Several of these pre-Naivasha deals were rejected when the SPLM/A leader Dr. John Garang de Mabior lost power.

The wealth-sharing section of the CPA states that all agreements signed prior to the CPA would hold; they would not be subject to review by the National Petroleum Commission (NPC), a commission set up by the CPA and composed of both Khartoum and Southerners and co-chaired by both President al-Bashir of Khartoum and President Kiir of South Sudan. However, the CPA does not specify who could sign those pre-CPA agreements. According to some reports, the People's Republic of China has offered to extend a line of credit to South Sudan for several years while an alternative pipeline to the Kenyan coast is laid and an export deal is worked out with the Kenyan government, but this scenario is regarded as less likely than continued South Sudanese dependence on Sudanese infrastructure. If such a deal were struck, though, and South Sudan began exporting oil from Kenyan ports, the US would become a potential trade partner and South Sudanese oil importer. In the meantime, the South Sudanese government intends to lobby the US to ease restrictions on American companies doing business with Sudan.

=== Agriculture ===
South Sudan has the second highest proportion of women working in agriculture, forestry and fishing in the world.

South Sudan is rich in agricultural land and has one of the largest populations of pastoralists in the world. However, since 1999, when Sudan first started exporting oil, agricultural production in the country had declined. According to the World Bank, the average annual growth rate of the agricultural sector between 2000 and 2008 was only 3.6 percent, which is considerably lower than the 10.8 percent growth rate of the previous decade. The UN Food and Agriculture Agency (FAO) carried out an extensive satellite land cover survey that showed just 4.5 percent of the available land was under cultivation when South Sudan became independent.

South Sudan relies on food imports from neighboring countries, such as Uganda, Kenya and Sudan. These come at a high transportation cost, which, coupled with inflation, has caused food prices to rise dramatically in South Sudan. The declining agricultural production and the reliance on expensive foreign food supplies have contributed to a severe food shortage in South Sudan. Around 2.7 million South Sudanese will need food aid in 2012 according to the United Nations' food programme.

The government has begun to address the issue of agriculture and food security. According to Elizabeth Manoa Majok, undersecretary in the Ministry of Commerce, Industry and Investment, the government of South Sudan has made food production a top priority. The Ministry of Agriculture in South Sudan has announced its goal of boosting food production in South Sudan to two million metric tons per year by 2013. South Sudan hopes to attract agricultural investors from Gulf Arab states, Israel, China, the Netherlands and fellow African countries in order to increase production of basic food items such as sugar, rice, cereals and oilseeds, livestock as well as cotton.

In June 2011, the vice-president of South Sudan, Riek Machar Teny, announced a plan to mobilize $500 billion of foreign investment in the first five years of independence. Much of this investment would be focused in the agricultural sector, where the government hopes to diversify the economy and provide jobs to the large numbers of unemployed. The FAO has also drawn up a $50 million Interim Assistance Plan (IAP) for the agricultural sector that will build capacity in ministerial and state agricultural extension offices. This includes the establishment of a seed production sector and an urban and peri-urban agriculture component.

Smallholder farming accounts for 80 percent of the country's cereal production. Unfortunately, these farmers face a number of constraints due to high transport costs, unavailability of agricultural inputs, and underdeveloped agricultural extension services. Instead of investing resources into developing the kind of agricultural extension services that could help smallholder production, however, the government has chosen to focus on large-scale, private sector-led industrial agricultural schemes as a way to boost food production.

Donor countries promote the idea that industrial farming is the key to improved food security in South Sudan. The United States Agency for International Development (USAID), for example, is working with Citibank, the IFC, the Corporate Council on Africa, and others to help the country market its resources and attract private capital in key sectors, including agriculture.

This investment is intended to stimulate rural development and generate employment opportunities, increase food productivity, provide government institutions with new and sustainable sources of revenue, and help to diversify the economy. There is some concern, however, that a small transnational elite will benefit at the expense of the rural poor if the country's arable land is used to grow food for foreign populations, while simultaneously pushing communities onto increasingly marginal lands. This could create the potential for more food insecurity, instability, social unrest and conflict.

Nina Pedersen, manager of Norwegian People's Aid (NPA)'s Civil Society Development Project is concerned that in the rush to attract foreign investment for South Sudan not enough attention was paid as to whether the people negotiating the terms really knew the value of the land they were selling. According to the NPA, prior to South Sudan's declaration of Independence, beginning in 2007, private interests sought or secured 5.15 million hectares of land in the agriculture, biofuels, forestry, carbon credit, and ecotourism sectors—equivalent to more than eight percent of South Sudan's total land area.

One of the largest firms involved is the Egyptian private equity firm Citadel Capital, which has leased 259,500 acres for farming. This plantation has provided little local employment, being mostly run by Zimbabweans. A Ugandan conglomerate called the Madhvani Group has also entered into a preliminary agreement with the government of South Soudan to revitalize a government-owned sugar plantation and processing facility in Mangala Payam. This plantation would cover 10,000 ha of prime riverfront property along the Nile, about 70 kilometers north of Juba. According to the paramount chief in Mangala, the community has not been involved in any of the investment negotiations.

Concerns about foreign exploitation have led organizations such as OI and NPA to urge a moratorium on new land deals until a better framework is established.

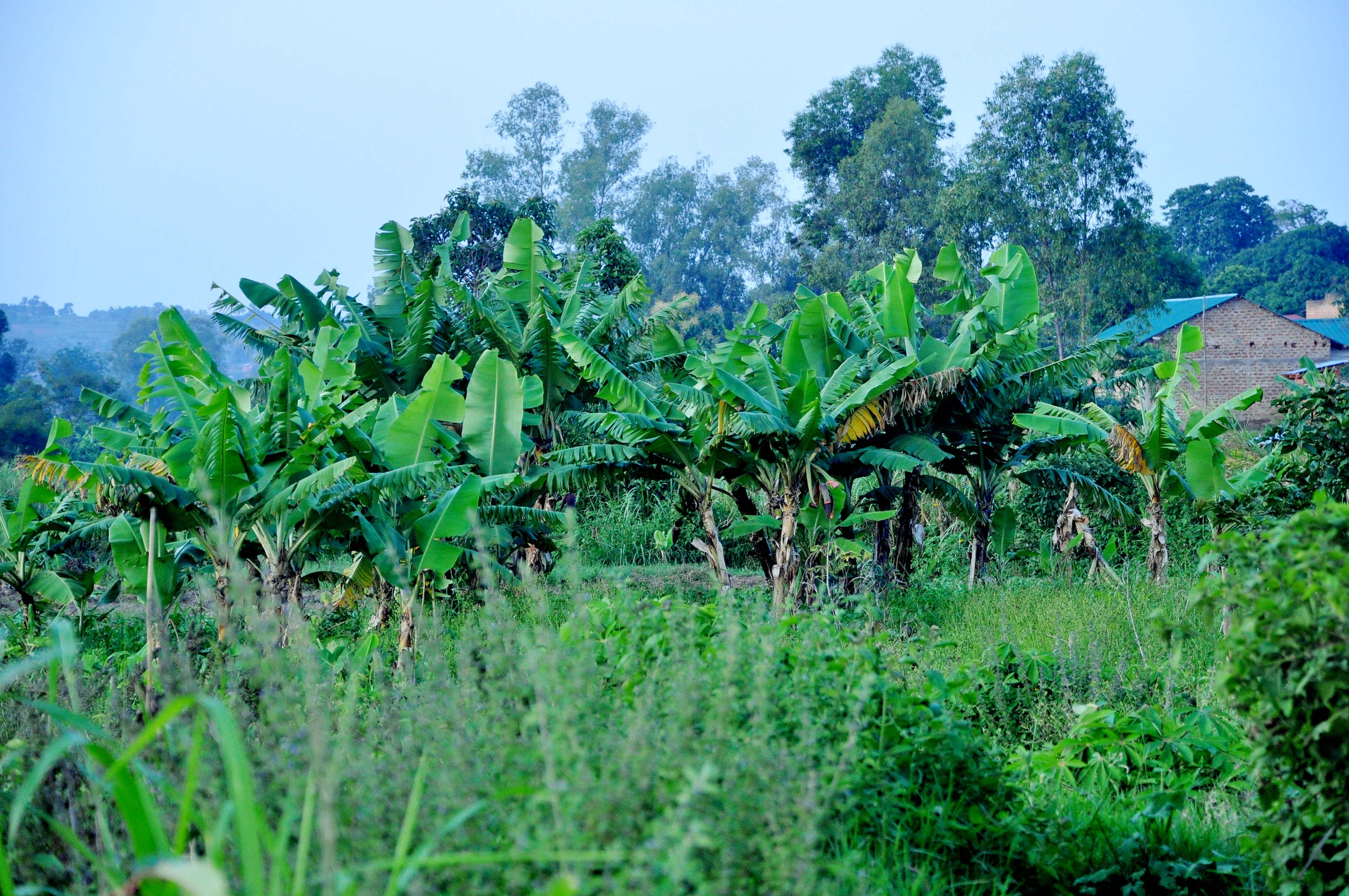
Banana plantation

For its part, South Sudan's Land Commission, a task force headed by Robert Lado in charge of advising the government and drawing up the new policy, is pushing for land administrations at county and sub-county level that are run by community members, including women and tribal elders.

== Infrastructure ==
In 2012, The World Bank approved a four-year, US$38 million investment loan to South Sudan's Ministry of Roads and Bridges to build rural and inter-urban roads and highways. Access to clean water in South Sudan is a major challenge for many people.

The nation has some telecommunications service through operators like MTN Group (formerly known as Investcom), but currently lacks the infrastructure to offer high speed Internet connections. In September 2022 South Sudan and Djibouti signed an agreement to lay fibre optic cable from Djibouti to South Sudan’s capital, Juba, via Ethiopia. In March 2015, South Sudan's minister for telecommunications and postal services revealed plans for the government to lay 1,600 kilometers of fiber-optic cable across the country within two years. The government plans to connect this network with undersea cables via existing infrastructure in Uganda and Tanzania.

== Currency ==
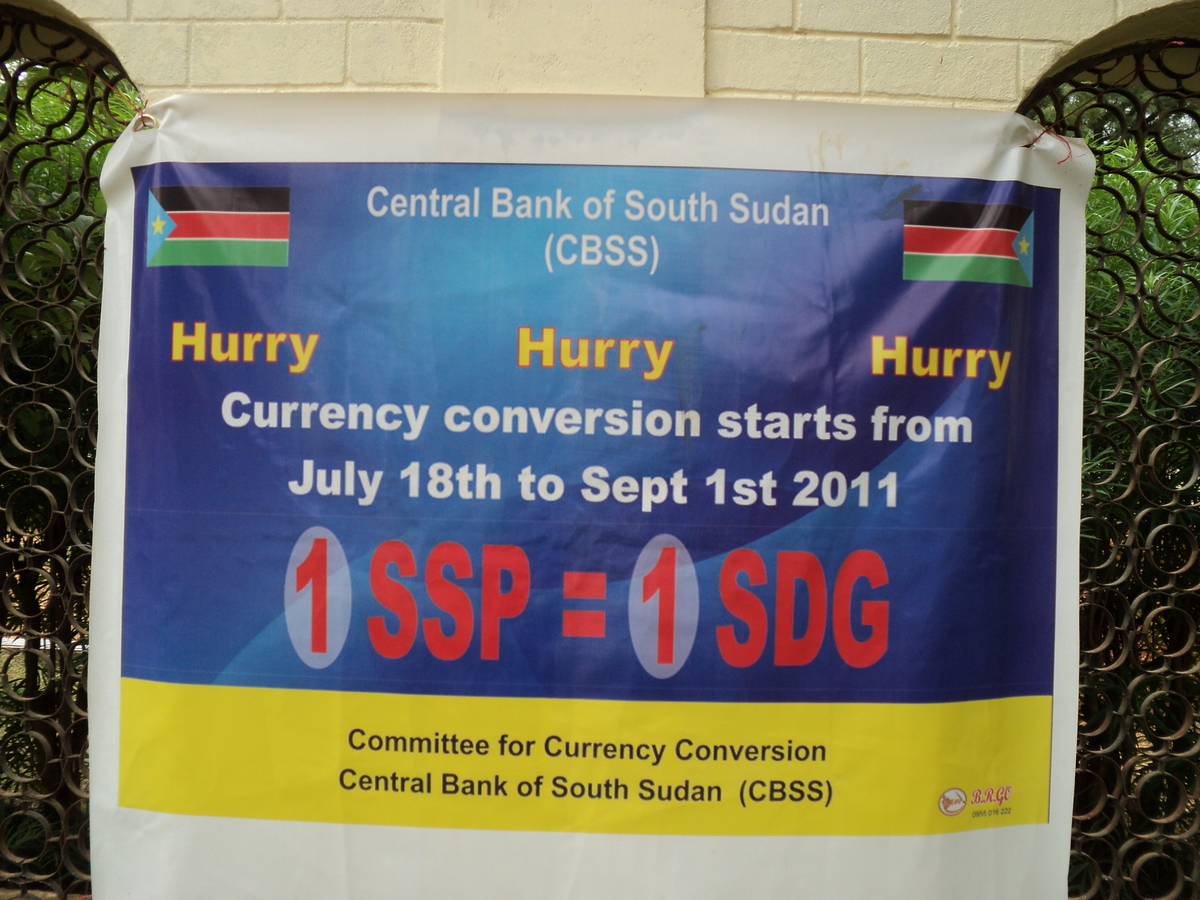
Banner in Juba announcing the conversion from the Sudanese pound (SDG) to the new currency the South Sudanese pound (SSP)

The South Sudanese pound is the currency of South Sudan. It is subdivided into 100 piasters. It was approved by the Southern Sudan Legislative Assembly before secession on 9 July 2011 from Sudan. It was introduced on 18 July 2011, and replaced the Sudanese pound at par. On 1 September 2011, the Sudanese pound ceased to be legal tender in South Sudan.

== Inflation ==
Inflation, measured by changes in consumer prices, was around 45% in 2011 and 2012. After a brief period of very low inflation in 2013 and 2014, inflation increased sharply in 2015 and then surged to an extreme peak in 2016 to 380%. Inflation declined then, falling to about 190% in 2017 and to around 85% in 2018 and 2019. From 2020 to 2022, inflation dropped further, reaching low or negative levels, before rising again in 2024 to roughly 90%. Inflation was driven by the monetization of the fiscal deficit by the Bank of South Sudan, and fell after the pace of money printing slowed, falling to about 102% the following year. Inflation severely constrained household purchasing power, leaving many families in both urban and rural areas unable to afford even minimum food needs.

== Macroeconomic trends ==
The following table shows the main economic indicators in 2011-2026 (from independence). Inflation below 5% is in green.

| Year | GDP | | | GDP growth (real) | Inflation | Government debt (% of GDP) |
| Year | Total (bil. US$ PPP) | Per capita (US$ PPP) | Total (bil. US$ nominal) | GDP growth (real) | Inflation | Government debt (% of GDP) |
|---|---|---|---|---|---|---|
| 2011 | 14.6 | 1421 | 17.3 | n/a | n/a | 0 |
| 2012 | ▼7.4 | ▼688 | ▼11.3 | ▼ -50.3 | ▲42.4 | ▲8.9 |
| 2013 | ▲9.6 | ▲857 | ▲14.9 | ▲27.3 | ▲ -2.7 | ▲17.6 |
| 2014 | ▲9.9 | ▲880 | ▼14.6 | ▲1.6 | ▲4.3 | ▲39.6 |
| 2015 | ▲10.0 | ▲897 | ▲15.1 | ▼ -0.2 | ▲53 | ▲58.2 |
| 2016 | ▼8.7 | ▼805 | ▼2.8 | ▼ -13.3 | ▲346.1 | ▲128.9 |
| 2017 | ▼8.4 | ▲815 | ▼2.7 | ▼ -5.8 | ▲213 | ▼77.5 |
| 2018 | ▼6.1 | ▼601 | ▼2.6 | ▼ -2.1 | ▲83.4 | ▲84.3 |
| 2019 | ▲7.8 | ▲748 | ▲4.0 | ▲0.9 | ▲49.3 | ▼43.4 |
| 2020 | ▲8.6 | ▲806 | ▲5.4 | ▼ -6.5 | ▲24 | ▲48.3 |
| 2021 | ▲14.5 | ▲1334 | ▲5.9 | ▲5.3 | ▲30.2 | ▲56.4 |
| 2022 | ▲14.7 | ▲1336 | ▲7.5 | ▼ -5.2 | ▲ -3.2 | ▼42.1 |
| 2023 | ▲15.7 | ▲1369 | ▼7.4 | ▲3 | ▲39.7 | ▲62 |
| 2024 | ▼11.9 | ▼997 | ▼4.6 | ▼ -26.1 | ▲99.8 | ▼53.4 |
| 2025 | ▲17.9 | ▲1467 | ▲5.7 | ▲46.1 | ▲97.6 | ▲62.1 |
| 2026 | ▲19.2 | ▲1540 | ▲6.1 | ▲4.1 | ▲14 | ▼57.3 |

== East African Community membership ==
The presidents of Kenya and Rwanda invited the Autonomous Government of Southern Sudan to apply for membership upon the independence of South Sudan in 2011, and South Sudan was reportedly an applicant country as of mid-July 2011. By early-October, South Sudan was officially expected to become a member in the future. Analysts suggested that South Sudan's early efforts to integrate infrastructure, including rail links and oil pipelines, with systems in Kenya and Uganda indicated intention on the part of Juba to pivot away from dependence on Sudan and toward the EAC. Reuters considered South Sudan the likeliest candidate for EAC expansion in the short term, and an article in Tanzanian daily The Citizen that reported East African Legislative Assembly Speaker Abdirahin Haithar Abdi said South Sudan was "free to join the EAC" asserted that analysts believe the country will soon become a full member of the regional body.

On 17 September 2011, the Daily Nation quoted a South Sudanese MP as saying that while his government was eager to join the EAC, it would likely delay its membership over concerns that its economy was not sufficiently developed to compete with EAC member states and could become a "dumping ground" for Kenyan, Tanzanian, and Ugandan exports. This was contradicted by President Salva Kiir, who announced South Sudan had officially embarked on the application process one month later. The application was initially deferred by the EAC in December 2012, however incidents with Ugandan boda-boda operators in South Sudan have created political tension and may delay the process.

In December 2012, Tanzania officially agreed to South Sudan's bid to join the EAC, clearing the way for the world's newest state to become the regional bloc's sixth member. In May 2013 the EAC set aside $82,000 for the admission of South Sudan into the bloc even though admission may not happen until 2016. The process, to start after the EAC Council of Ministers meeting in August 2013, was projected to take at least four years. At the 14th Ordinary Summit held in Nairobi in 2012, EAC heads of state approved the verification report that was presented by the Council of Ministers, then directed it to start the negotiation process with South Sudan.

A team was formed to assess South Sudan's bid; however, in April 2014, the nation requested a delay in the admissions process, presumably due to South Sudanese Civil War.

South Sudan's Minister of Foreign Affairs, Barnaba Marial Benjamin, claimed publicly in October 2015 that, following evaluations and meetings of a special technical committee in May, June, August, September and October, the committee has recommended that South Sudan be allowed to join the East African Community. Those recommendations, however, had not been officially released to the public. It was reported that South Sudan could be admitted as early as November 2015 when the heads of East African States had their summit meeting.

South Sudan was eventually approved for membership in East African Community in March 2016, and formally acceded with the signature of the treaty in April 2016.

== See also ==
- Transport in South Sudan
- United Nations Economic Commission for Africa
