= Kampala–Gulu Highway =

Road in Uganda

Coordinates: 02°14′04″N 32°14′46″E

Route information
- Length: 205 mi (330 km)

Major junctions
- South end: Kampala
- Bombo; Luweero; Kigumba; Kiryandongo; Karuma; Kamdini; Omoro
- North end: Gulu

Location
- Country: Uganda

Highway system
- Roads in Uganda

The Kampala–Gulu Highway, also Kampala–Gulu Road, is a road connecting Uganda's capital city of Kampala, in the Central Region, with the city of Gulu, the largest urban centre in the country's Northern Region.

== Location ==
The road starts in Kampala and continues north, through eight Ugandan districts, and ends in Gulu, a distance of approximately 330 kilometres (205 mi).

The road passes through the districts of Kampala, Wakiso, Luweero, Nakasongola, Kiryandongo, Oyam, Omoro and Gulu.

== Overview ==
The road from Kampala to Gulu is old (first constructed in the 1940s), and narrow. Instead of the regulatory 7 metres (23 ft) of roadway, with shoulders and drainage channels, this road is only 6 metres (20 ft) in some sections, leaving little room for vehicles to overtake one another. The Kampala–Gulu Road, is one of the most accident-prone in the country, along with Kampala–Jinja Road, Kampala–Masaka Road and the Kampala Northern Bypass Highway.

In 2016, the Uganda National Roads Authority (UNRA), committed to widen the narrow sections of this road.

== Intersections ==
Along its journey, the Kampala–Gulu Highway intersects with several major roadways, including the following: (a) at Bwaise, it cuts across the Kampala Northern Bypass Highway. (b) the 42 kilometres (26 mi) Matugga–Kapeeka Road peels off the highway at Matugga. (c) in Wobulenzi, the Ziroobwe–Wobulenzi Road connects with this highway (d) the Luweero–Butalangu Road intersects with the Gulu highway in Luweero. (e) the Kafu–Masindi Road, measuring 41 kilometres (25 mi), branches off the Gulu highway at Kafu, Uganda, in Kiryandongo District.

(f) At Rwekunye, the Rwekunye–Apac–Aduku–Lira–Kitgum–Musingo Road meets the Kampala–Gulu Highway. (g) The 52 kilometres (32 mi) Masindi–Kigumba Road meets with the Gulu Highway. (h) in Karuma, north of the Karuma Bridge, the Karuma–Olwiyo–Pakwach–Nebbi–Arua Road makes a sharp left turn, off the Kampala-Gulu Highway. (i) Approximately 11 kilometres (7 mi) further north, at Kamdini, the Kamdini–Lira Road, makes a sharp right turn to continue on to Lira, 68 kilometres (42 mi) to the east.

In Gulu, this road interacts with the Gulu–Nimule Road and with the Gulu-Kitgum Road.

== Other considerations ==
When the Kampala–Bombo Expressway is built, as expected, it will constitute the first 33 kilometres (21 mi) of the Kampala–Gulu Highway. From Kamdini, the Kampala–Gulu Highway continues north, for another 62 kilometres (39 mi), as the Kamdini–Gulu Road.

== See also ==
- Transport in Uganda
- List of roads in Uganda
- List of cities and towns in Uganda
