= Acholibur–Gulu–Olwiyo Road =

Road in Uganda

Coordinates: 02°57′03″N 32°16′17″E

Route information
- Length: 104 mi (167 km)
- History: Designated in 2015; Completion in 2019

Major junctions
- Northeast end: Acholibur
- Gulu; Nwoya; Anaka
- Southwest end: Olwiyo

Location
- Country: Uganda

Highway system
- Roads in Uganda

The Acholibur–Gulu–Olwiyo Road is a road in the Northern Region of Uganda, connecting the town of Acholibur to the city of Gulu and the town of Olwiyo.

== Location ==
The road starts at Acholibur, a small town on the Kitgum–Lira road, approximately 19 kilometres (12 mi) south of Kitgum. The road continues in a southwesterly direction to Gulu (2014 population: 152,276), the most populous city in the Northern Region. The road then continues through Nwoya and Anaka to end at Olwiyo in Nwoya District, a distance of about 150 kilometres (93 mi). The road connects the districts of Kitgum, Pader, Gulu, and Nwoya. The coordinates of the road near Gulu are 2°48'24.0"N, 32°19'29.0"E (Latitude:2.806667; Longitude:32.324722).

== Upgrading to bitumen ==
In 2009, the Ugandan government commissioned a feasibility study and detailed engineering design for this road and the Rwekunye–Apac–Aduku–Lira–Kitgum–Musingo Road, both in northern Uganda. The reports became available in 2013. On 21 February 2015, the upgrade from unsealed gravel surface to class II bitumen surface was commissioned by President Yoweri Museveni. The work on the 73 kilometres (45 mi) from Acholibur to Unyama is assigned to China Railway No.5 Engineering Group. The 70 kilometres (43 mi) road section from Unyama to Olwiyo was upgraded by Jiangxi Zhongmei Engineering Construction Company Limited. Work was expected to last three years. The road project is fully funded by the Ugandan government.

== See also ==
- List of roads in Uganda
- Economy of Uganda
- Transport in Uganda
