= Richard Todwong =

Ugandan politician

- Born: 24 November 1973 (age 52); Anaka, Uganda
- Citizenship: Uganda
- Education: Makerere University (Bachelor of Arts in Political Science and Economics) (Master in International Relations); Uganda Management Institute (Diploma in Management); Uganda Revenue Authority (Diploma in Revenue & Tax Management)
- Occupation: Politician
- Years active: 1999 — present
- Known for: Politics

Richard Todwong is a Ugandan politician. He is the Secretary General of the National Resistance Movement He was the Minister Without Portfolio in the Ugandan Cabinet. He was appointed to that position on 15 August 2012. He replaced Nasser Sebaggala who was appointed in May 2011, but was rejected by parliament. Richard Todwong was also the elected Member of Parliament for Nwoya County, Nwoya District.

== Background ==
He was born on 24 November 1973 in Anaka, Nwoya District.

== Education ==
Richard Todwong holds the degree of Political Science and Economics at Makerere University, Uganda's oldest and largest public university, His degree of Master of Arts in International Relations (M.A.Int.Rel.) was also obtained from Makerere. His Diploma in Management (Dip.Mgnt.) was obtained from the Uganda Management Institute. He also holds the postgraduate Diploma in Revenue and Tax Administration from the Uganda Revenue Authority (URA).

== Work experience ==
From 1999 until 2000, Todwong worked as a revenue officer at the Uganda Revenue Authority, the Uganda government body responsible for tax collection. From 2000 until 2003, he served as a commissioner at the Constitutional Revenue Commission under the Ministry of Justice and Constitutional Affairs Between 2006 and 2010, he served as a special advisor to the President of Uganda attached to Northern Uganda. In 2011, he entered elected politics by contesting for the Nwoya County Constituency in the Parliament of Uganda where he served until 2015. He ran on the National Resistance Movement (NRM) political party ticket. He was elected as the Deputy Secretary General of the NRM, a position he held until 2021. He is the current secretary general of the NRM.

Richard Todwong has been a regular attendee and speaker at the annual Ugandan North American Association (UNAA) convention in the USA.

== See also ==
- Cabinet of Uganda
- Parliament of Uganda
