= Kigumba Petroleum Institute =

School in Uganda

- Type: Public
- Established: 2009 (age 16–17)
- Chancellor: Prof. Charles Kwesiga
- Vice-Chancellor: Justine Odong
- Students: 88 (2011)
- Location: Kigumba, Uganda; 01°50′34″N 32°01′09″E
- Campus: Rural
- Website: Homepage
- Location in Uganda

Kigumba Petroleum Institute, also referred to as Uganda Petroleum Institute or as Uganda Petroleum Institute, Kigumba (UPIK), is a government-owned, national center for training, research and consultancy in the field of petroleum exploration, recovery, refinement and responsible utilization in Uganda.

== Location ==
The institute is located approximately 4 miles (6.4 km) north of the town of Kigumba, off of the Kigumba–Karuma Road, in Kiryandongo District, Western Uganda. This location lies approximately 41 kilometres (25 mi), by road, northeast of Masindi, the nearest large town in the sub-region. Uganda Petroleum Institute is located approximately 203 kilometres (126 mi), by road, northwest of Kampala, Uganda's capital and largest city. The coordinates of the Institute's campus are: 01°50'34.0"N, 32°01'09.0"E (Latitude:1.842778; Longitude:32.019167).

== History ==
The institute was established in 2009 and admitted the first batch of students in 2010, with the objective of training personnel in petroleum-related skills, at certificate, diploma and undergraduate levels. In 2011, increased budgetary allocations were made towards the elevation of the institute from a vocational school to a fully-fledged International University. Financial assistance to the tune of US$8 million (UGX:20 billion), will be sought from the World Bank and Irish Aid, to achieve this goal. In November 2011, the Uganda Government began the process of elevating the Institute to University status.

== Recent developments ==
In 2014, the institute introduced five new internationally recognized programs to graduate "highly qualified and specialized" technicians needed by oil companies across the world. The new plan proposes wide ranging overhaul of the curriculum and the introduction of five new diploma courses in oil studies. The institute also plans to work in close collaboration with the Ugandan oil industry to graduate over 220 students annually by the year 2019, up from 54 in 2014.

== Courses ==
As of November 2019, the institute offers three diploma courses:

- Diploma in Petroleum Engineering
- Diploma in Upstream Petroleum Operations
- Diploma in Downstream Petroleum Operations.

== See also ==
- Ugandan Universities
- Ugandan Vocational Colleges
- Education in Uganda
- Uganda Oil Refinery
