= Hellen Kahunde =

Ugandan politician (born 1982)

Honorable Hellen Kahunde
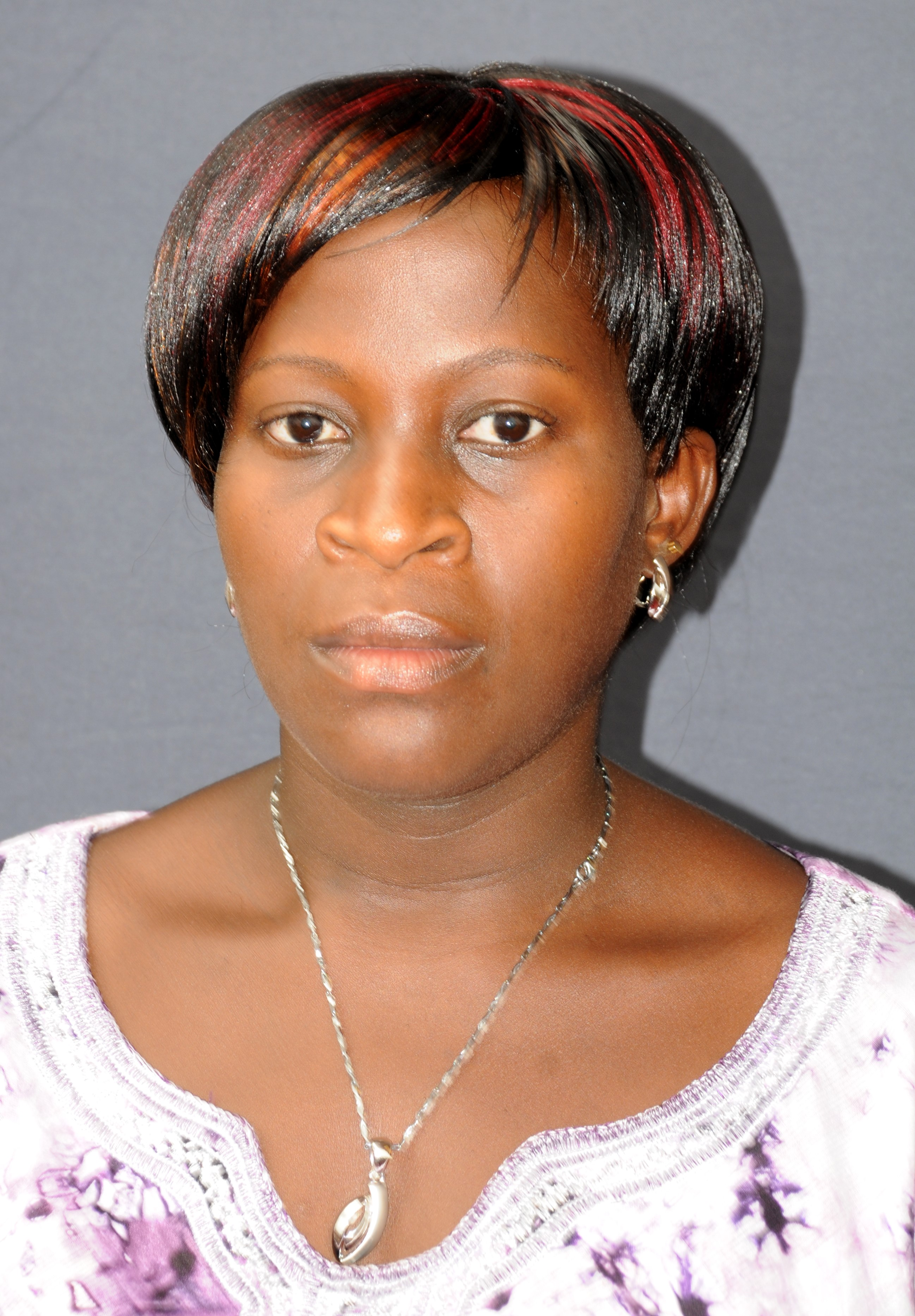
- Kahunde in 2011
- Born: 27 November 1982 (age 43); Wobulenzi, Uganda
- Citizenship: Uganda
- Education: Gulu University (Bachelor of Science Education); Uganda Management Institute (Postgraduate Diploma in Monitoring & Evaluation)
- Occupations: Educator and politician
- Years active: 2008 to present
- Title: Member of Parliament for Kiryandongo District Women' Constituency

Hellen Kahunde, also Helen Kahunde (born 27 November 1982), is a Ugandan educator and politician who serves as the Member of Parliament representing the Kiryandongo District Women' Constituency in the 10th Parliament (2016 to 2021). In 2021 she was re elected into parliament. In the eleventh parliament, she serves on the Committee on East African Community Affairs.

== Early life and education ==
Kahunde was born in Uganda on 27 November 2018. She attended Gulu Sacred Heart Secondary School in Gulu, the largest city in the Northern Region of Uganda, for her Ordinary Level studies. She transferred to Our Lady of Good Counsel Secondary School, in Gayaza, Wakiso District, where she completed her high school studies.

She was admitted to Gulu University in 2003, graduating in 2007 with a Bachelor of Science Education. Later, she graduated from the Uganda Management Institute, in Kampala, with a Postgraduate Diploma in Monitoring and Evaluation.

== Career ==
Before joining elective politics, she taught science at Kigumba Intensive Secondary School, in Kigumba, Kiryandongo District, from 2008 until 2008.

In 2011, she contested for the Women Constituency in Kiryandongo District. She won, becoming the first-ever Women's Member of Parliament in the district that was created on 1 July 2010. She was re-elected in 2016, running again on the ruling National Resistance Movement political party ticket.

In parliament she is a member of the "Committee on Science and Technology" and a member of the "Committee on Presidential Affairs".

== Family ==
Helen Kahunde is married.

== See also ==
- Monica Azuba Ntege
- Winnie Kiiza
- Ruth Nankabirwa
