= Uganda Hotel and Tourism Training Institute =

Government-owned institute in Uganda

Coordinates: 00°26′13″N 33°11′59″E

- Company type: Parastatal
- Industry: Hospitality industry
- Founded: 1989
- Headquarters: Jinja, Uganda
- Products: Hotel managers, tour guides, waitresses and waiters, professional chefs, housekeepers and others
- Website: Homepage

The Uganda Hotel and Tourism Training Institute is a parastatal company, wholly owned by the government of Uganda, whose primary objective is to train and educate personnel in the hospitality and tourism industry, to promote tourism and deliver professional, sustainable services to tourists and promote the profitability and sustainability of Uganda's national tourist resources.

== Location ==
The institute is located off of Nalufenya Road, in the city of Jinja, in Jinja District, Busoga sub-region, in the Eastern Region of Uganda. This location is approximately 79 kilometres (49 mi), by road, east of Kampala, Uganda's capital and largest city. The geographical coordinates of the hotel and training institute are: 0°26'13.0"N, 33°11'59.0"E (Latitude:0.436944; Longitude:33.199722).

== History ==
The institute was established in 1989 as a pilot school under the International Labour Organization and United Nations Development Programme. In 1991, the Fairway Hotel was repossessed by its original Asian. The ILO and UNDP pulled out of the project and the government of Uganda took over the school entirely.

Statute Number 14 of September 1994, established the present Hotel and Tourism Training Institute and transferred the former Crested Crane Hotel and all its assets to the new Institute. The Statute commenced in 1994, and the institute resumed training in mid 1996 at Crested Crane Hotel in Jinja, under the Ministry of Wildlife and Antiquities, later Ministry of, Tourism, Trade and Industry.

In 1998, the institute was transferred to the Ministry of Education and Sports. Under this ministry, the institute was renovated and upgraded with funding from the World Bank. In November 2007, the institute was again moved back to the Ministry of Tourism Trade and Industry. In 2016, when that ministry was split, the institute was assigned to the Uganda Ministry of Tourism, Wildlife and Antiquities.

== Courses ==
Certificate courses

The following one-year courses are on offer:

- Certificate in Hotel Operations
- Certificate in Tour Guiding and Driving
- Certificate in Pastry and Bakery

Diploma courses

The following diploma courses are offered:

- Diploma in Hotel Management (3 years)
- Diploma in Tourism Management (2 years)
- Diploma in Pastry and Bakery (2 years)

== Renovations ==
Beginning in May 2018, major renovations, are expected to start at the institute, to improve the infrastructure and raise training standards to international levels. The renovations are funded by a World Bank loan to the tune of US$7 million. The renovations and upgrade, to increase the hotel room count to 50 rooms were flagged off by Ephraim Kamuntu, the Uganda Minister of Tourism, Wildlife and Antiquities, on Wednesday 25 April 2018. ROKO Construction Limited, a Ugandan construction firm was awarded the renovation contract.

As of July 2024, civil works were estimated at 58 percent completion. The engineering, procurement and construction (EPC) contractor is reported as CRJE East Africa Limited. The new infrastructure includes an administration block, a classroom block, and a multi-purpose hall. A computer lab and a library, both with capacity of 90 students are part of the new construction, as well as a new state-of-the-art teaching kitchen.

== See also ==
- Uganda Industrial Research Institute
- Nakawa Vocational Training Institute
- List of vocational colleges in Uganda
- Uganda Ministry of Tourism, Wildlife and Antiquities
