= Kigumba =

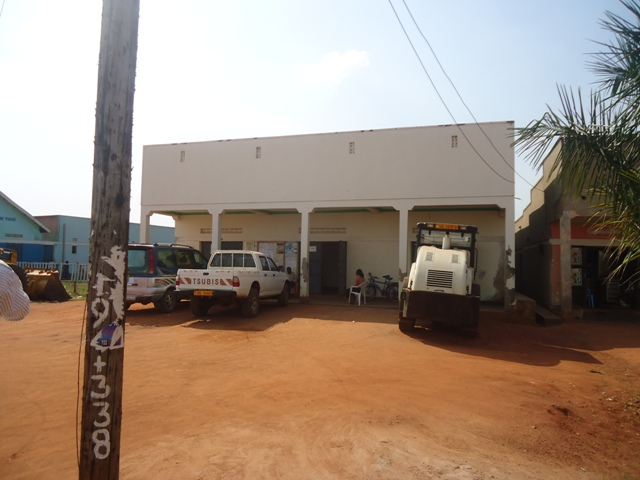

- Map of Uganda showing the location of Kigumba.
- Coordinates: 01°48′54″N 32°00′36″E
- Country: Uganda
- Region: Western Uganda
- Sub-region: Bunyoro sub-region
- District: Kiryandongo District
- Elevation: 1,180 m (3,870 ft)

Population (2020 Estimates)
  - Total: 22,000
- Time zone: UTC+3 (EAT)

Kigumba is a town in Kiryandongo District, northwestern Uganda. It is one of the urban centers in the district. The other urban centres in Kiryandongo District include: (a) Karuma b) Kiryandongo (c) Bweyale and (d) Masindi Port.

== Location ==
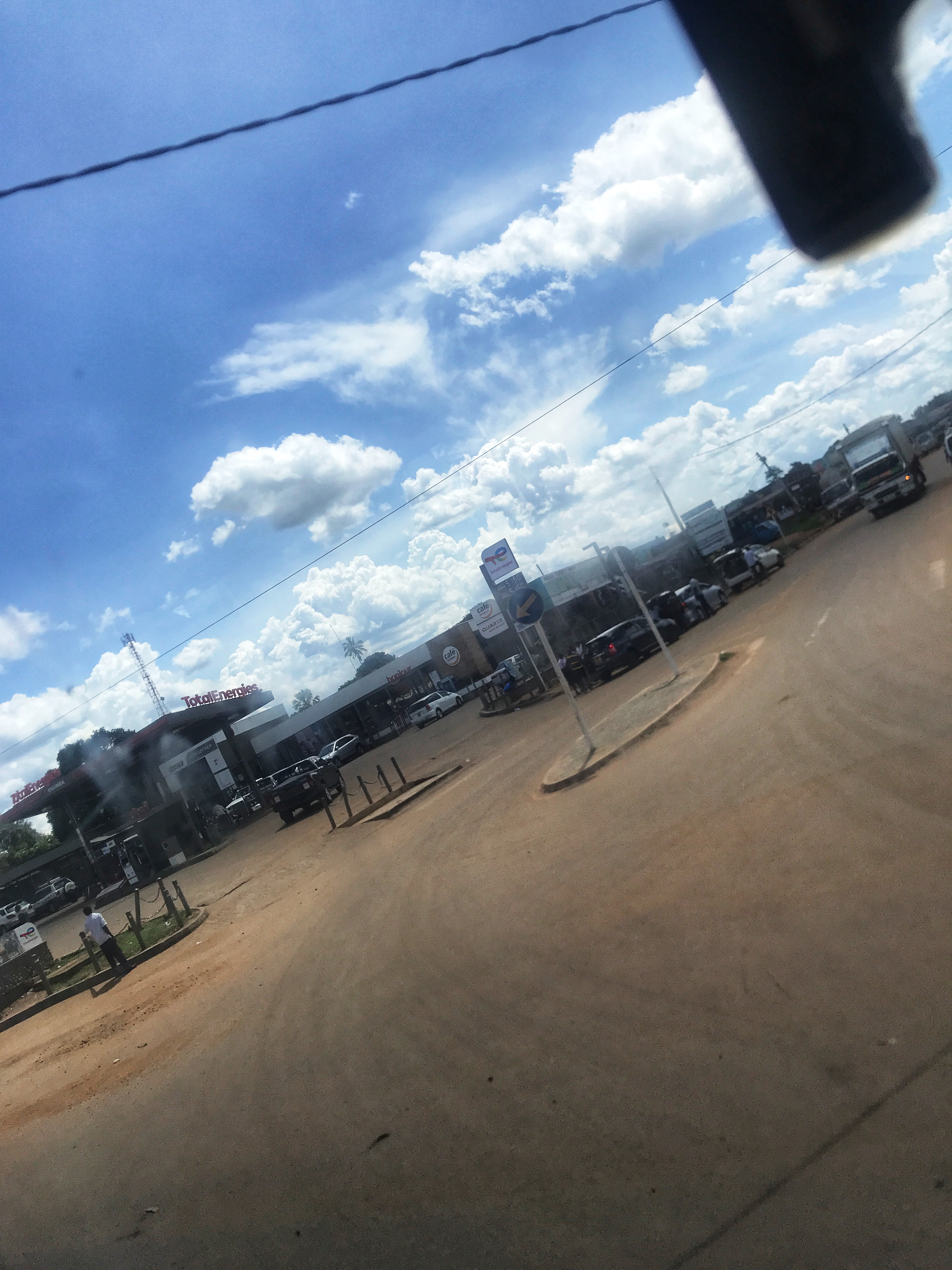
kigumba town

Kigumba is located approximately 40 kilometres (25 mi), by road, northeast of Masindi (pop. 110,500 in 2020), the nearest large city. This location lies approximately 200 kilometres (124 mi), by road, north-northwest of Kampala, the capital and largest city in Uganda. Kigumba lies approximately 10 kilometres (6 mi), by road, south of Kiryandongo, where the district headquarters are located. The coordinates of the town are:01 48 54N, 32 00 36E (Latitude:1.8150; Longitude:32.0100).

== Overview ==
Kigumba lies at the location where the highway from Kampala to Gulu through Kibangya and Rwekunye joins the highway from Masindi to Gulu. It is a busy transit point. Established in the 1950s, the town is home to about 100 Ugandan and Kenyan ethnicities. In 2009, the town attained Municipal council status. The municipality consists of the following neighborhoods: (a) Old Kigumba (b) Naguru (c) Kigaragara (d) Kitwanga, the CBD (e) Kihura I (f) Kihura II and (g) Kabukye. Most of the developments are in the Kitwanga neighborhood. Here one can find the town council offices, financial institutions, factories, restaurants and most bars. The booming trade, has also attracted Indian, Chinese and South Sudanese traders, who have established businesses, including food processing plants.

== Organizational structure ==
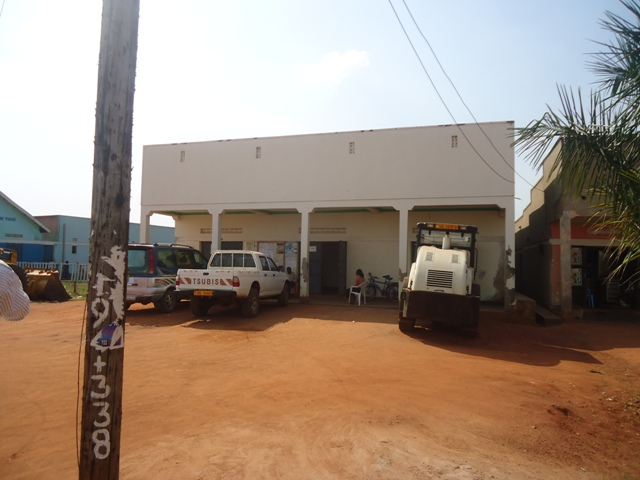
Kigumba Town Council Offices

The political head of the town is the LC III Chairperson who is elected to a five-year term by universal adult suffrage across the six wards. The supreme policy-making organ is the Town Council, composed of 12 elected councilors. The technical staff of the municipality is headed by the town clerk, Mr. Akugizibwe Gabriel under whom there are several municipal departments.

As of August 2014, the LC III chairman of the Town Council is Mr. Karubanga Jacob Ateenyi and the town clerk is Mr. Akugizibwe Gabriel

== Population ==
The census in 2002 enumerated the population at 8,439 people. In 2014, the national population census and household survey put the population of Kigumba at 18,625. In July 2020, the Uganda Bureau of Statistics estimated the midyear population of the town at 22,000. The population agency calculated that the population of the town had increased at an average annual rate of 2.98 percent, between 2014 and 2020.

Historical population
Year	Pop.	±%
2002	8,439	—
2014	18,625	+120.7%
2020	22,000	+18.1%

== Economic activities ==
Many women in the town engage in such activities as farming, road-side groceries, market vending, restaurants, hair care, and health care clinics. Men are mainly engaged in wholesale and retail merchandising, taxi driving and boda boda (motorcycle and bicycle) for-hire transportation. Increasingly, residents of Kigumba Town are employed in salaried and non-salaried positions at the district headquarters in Bweyale.

== Points of interest ==
Masindi, the largest town in the sub-region, lies approximately 45 kilometres (28 mi), by road, to the southwest of Kigumba. The district headquarters at Kiryandongo, are located approximately 8 kilometres (5.0 mi), north of Kigumba. Located within the town itself is Kigumba Petroleum Institute (KPI), a tertiary institution of education belonging to the Ugandan government. The Institute occupies premises that formerly housed, Uganda Cooperative College, which has now relocated to the Eastern Ugandan town of Tororo. KPI has now been elevated to University status. Kigumba Central Market is the largest fresh-food market in town. Stanbic Bank (Uganda) Limited, the largest commercial bank in Uganda, by assets and branches, maintains a branch in Kigumba.

== See also ==
- Kigumba Petroleum Institute
- Kiryandongo District
- Bunyoro sub-region
