= Anaka =

- Town Council
- Location in Uganda
- Coordinates: 02°36′03″N 31°56′52″E
- Country: Uganda
- Region: Northern Region
- Sub-region: Acholi sub-region
- District: Nwoya District
- Elevation: 3,300 ft (1,000 m)

Anaka is a town in the Northern Region of Uganda. It is the site of the Nwoya District headquarters.

== Location ==
Anaka is on the Acholibur–Gulu–Olwiyo Road, the main highway between Gulu and Pakwach. It is about 53 kilometres (33 mi) south-west of Gulu, the largest city in the sub-region. The coordinates of the town are 02°36'03.0"N, 31°56'52.0"E (Latitude:2.600839; Longitude:31.947775).

== Points of interest ==
The following points of interest lie within the town limits or close to the edges of the town:

- The offices of Anaka Town Council
- Anaka General Hospital - A 120-bed public hospital, administered by the Uganda Ministry of Health
- Anaka central market
- The Acholibur–Gulu–Olwiyo Road, the main highway between Gulu and Pakwach
- Pope Paul VI Senior Secondary School
- Anaka Catholic Church

== See also ==
- Nwoya
- Karuma
- Pakuba
- Acholi sub-region
- Acholi people
