= Rwekunye =

- Location in Uganda
- Coordinates: 01°42′39″N 32°01′44″E
- Country: Uganda
- Region: Western Region of Uganda
- Districts of Uganda: Kiryandongo District
- Elevation: 3,870 ft (1,180 m)

Rwekunye is a settlement in Kiryandongo District in the Western Region of Uganda.

== Location ==
Rwekunye is 192 kilometres (119 mi) northwest of Kampala on the Kampala–Gulu Highway. It is located immediately west of the larger area of Masindi Port, along the Rwekunye–Apac–Aduku–Lira–Kitgum–Musingo Road. The coordinates of Rwekunye are 1°42'39.0"N, 32°01'44.0"E (Latitude:1.710833; Longitude:32.028889).

== Overview ==
Rwekunye is functionally a suburb of the larger urban area of Masindi Port (estimated 2009 population 10,400), located 5 kilometres (3 mi) to the east on the banks of the Victoria Nile.

== Points of interest ==
The town has additional points of interest, including the following:

- the Rwekunye–Apac–Aduku–Lira–Kitgum–Musingo Road meets the Kampala–Gulu Highway in Rwekunye
- Rwekunye central market

== See also ==
- Bunyoro sub-region
- List of roads in Uganda
- List of cities and towns in Uganda
