= Olwiyo =

- Location in Uganda
- Coordinates: 02°32′15″N 31°53′06″E
- Country: Uganda
- District: Nwoya

Olwiyo is a town in Nwoya District in the Northern Region of Uganda.

== Location ==
The town is approximately 21 kilometres (13 mi), by road, southwest of Nwoya, the site of the district headquarters. The town is at the intersection of the Karuma–Pakwach road with the Acholibur–Gulu–Olwiyo Road, approximately 314 kilometres (195 mi) north of Kampala, the capital and largest city of Uganda. The coordinates of Olwiyo are 2°32'15.0"N, 31°53'06.0"E (Latitude:2.5375; Longitude:31.8850).

== Power line ==
A 60 kilometres (37 mi) 440 kilovolt electricity line from Karuma Power Station is under construction to a substation in Olwiyo, under the supervision of Intec Gopa International Energy Consultants GmbH of Germany.

== See also ==
- List of roads in Uganda
- List of cities and towns in Uganda
