= Okello Sam =

Ugandan musician, actor, and comedian (born 1969)

Okello Kelo Sam
- Born: December 8, 1969 (age 56); Northern Uganda
- Education: Makerere University
- Occupations: Musician, actor, and comedian
- Spouse: Marian Lubega (m. 1998)

Okello Kelo Sam (born December 8, 1969) is a Ugandan musician, actor, and comedian. He is also the founder of Hope North, a secondary school and sanctuary for young victims of the war, in Uganda.

== Early life ==
Okello Kelo Sam was born on 8 December 1969 in Northern Uganda. He's the 3rd Child in a family that had one father, three wives and 20 siblings. His mother Eromina Alal Oting Lahee and father Oneka Sam. His mother was the first wife of his father. At the age of 16, on his way to school to pick up some test scores, he, and the group of students he was with, were abducted and forced to be part of the Lords Resistance Army. The group of kids were transported to Syria for a gruesome two week basic training. From there, they were split up and brought to various war fronts. About two years later, during a pitched battle, Okello found the opportunity and managed to escape. He managed to hitch a ride to Gulu, where he assumed his family would take shelter. When he did not find them there, Okello went back to his village, finding it an abandoned war zone.

Okello decided to go to the capital, Kampala, where his uncle lived. Okello's uncle gave Okello shelter. Okello stayed in his uncle's two room house along with his uncle's two wives and four children. Okello then did multiple duties such as, washing clothes, carrying water, and cleaning cars to make money and continue his education. He attended Makerere University pursuing a diploma in Performance Arts.

During this time, Okello discovered a dance company called Ndere Troupe and eventually got an interview and was offered to join the company. Through this, Okello's talent as a dancer, musician, actor, choreographer, cultural promoter, trainer, and arts director, became noticed. While in college, Okello married Marian Lubega and in 1994, they had their first child, Lawino Mieke Marilyn.

In 1998, Okello Sam's younger brother, Godfrey, was abducted during school with a group of 50 other children. Okello lived in hope that one day his brother, too, would escape. That is, until one morning, when Okello discovered gruesome photos in the morning newspaper, of 300 people killed in his home village. This included his brother. To honor his brother, Okello created a modern play based on Ugandan and Acholi storytelling and musical traditions which is called "Forged in Fire".

In his own words, "... my relatives, my friends, guys I go to school with, and when I got the news, I just broke down. So I get into my car, driving to the north, just doing it out of anger, out of frustration, so many of the people you know have died and you don’t know what else to do. So we kept on driving, driving, driving and I stopped. And an idea came to my mind."

== Career ==
Okello Kelo Sam is the Chairperson Uganda National Cultural Centre (UNCC), CEO Roots Retreat and Camping Resort and founder Hope North Uganda. His major film roles include "Abducted:War Child", by Robert E. Altman, "Silent Army, by Jean Van de Velde, which premiered at Cannes Film Festival in 2009.He also featured in The King of Scotland which featured youths from Hope North.

== Works ==
He choreographed dances and composed music for the Last King of Scotland. He wrote a play inspired by his brother Godfrey called "Vessels of Fire" which was developed at Dartmouth University with ETI, EastAfrica and Theatre without Boarders. His work with Hope North has brought him acclaim from famous supporters like Forest Whitaker, Susan Sarandon, Mary-Louise Parker, Josh Ritter and Rufus Wainright, and he has been interviewed on WNYC's "The Brian Lehrer Show", "The Big Picture with Thorm Hartmann" and more. Okello leads Workshops throughout Europe and the U.S. on Ugandan dance and music.

== Hope North ==
Okello Kelo Sam founded Hope North in 1998 after his brother's death. Hope North is a school and sanctuary for young victims of the civil war. Hope North assists orphans, refugees, and former child soldiers.

Hope North is accredited as a secondary school with 26 dedicated educators. The school must work with multiple obstacles such as lack of textbooks and no computers. The school has an international arts program, vocal training, and a working farm which is operated by the staff. The staff strive to give children a well-organized education which leads to careers.

Hope North's goal, according to Okello and the educators of Hope North, is to give the children a voice so they can speak up and make a difference.

A teacher at Hope North says, "These are the future leaders. What we do is what they try to copy. So running away from a problem is never a solution."

When Okello was asked why, after all he had been through, he didn't just give up, he replied: "I will not even think of falling. I will not even think of stopping. Because if we all had a challenge and stopped, then what would happen?"
