= Okaasai Sidronius Opolot =

Minister of State for Energy
- Incumbent
- Assumed office 2021
- President: Yoweri Museveni

Member of Parliament for Kumi County
- Incumbent
- Assumed office 2021

Director of Crop Resources, Ministry of Agriculture, Animal Industry and Fisheries
- Incumbent
- Assumed office 2010

Personal details
- Born: May 15, 1958 (age 68) Uganda
- Citizenship: Ugandan
- Party: National Resistance Movement
- Education: Teso College Aloet * Bukalasa Agricultural Training Institute * Nkumba College * University of Tripoli * University of Wales
- Profession: Agriculturalist, politician

Okaasai Sidronius Opolot also known as Sidronius Opolot Okasai (15 May 1958) is a Ugandan politician who serves as a Member of Parliament for Kumi County, Kumi District in the Parliament of Uganda and a Minister of State for Energy in the Ministry of Energy and Mineral Development of Uganda.

== Education background ==
Opolot went to Teso College Aloet in 1980 for his secondary education and from there, he joined Bukalasa Agricultural College, where he initially studied cooperatives and he did not complete the programme because of the insurgency in the Luwero Triangle.

From there, he joined Nkumba College, where he obtained a Diploma in Accounting and a bachelor's degree in Plant Protection, with a major in Plant Protection, from Al-Fateh University in Tripoli, Libya before obtaining a Master of Science in Plant Disease Management from the University of Wales, Aberystwyth, in the United Kingdom.

== Career ==
Opolot began his career in Uganda's agricultural sector in 1983 and in 2003, he became an Assistant Commissioner for Plant Protection at the Ministry of Agriculture, Animal Industry and Fisheries (MAAIF) as well as the project leader of the plant-clinic initiative.

In 2010, he became Director of Crop Resources at the Ministry of Agriculture, Animal Industry and Fisheries (MAAIF). After serving in the agricultural sector, Opolot entered elective politics and was elected to represent Kumi County in the 11th Parliament (2021–2026). In 2021, he was appointed Minister of State for Energy. He was re-elected to the 12th Parliament (2026–2031) and retained as Minister of State for Energy.

== See also ==
- Tress Bucyanayandi
- Frank Tumwebaze
- Wilberforce Kisamba Mugerwa
- Mary Goretti Kitutu
