= Karuma–Olwiyo–Pakwach–Nebbi–Arua Road =

Road in Uganda

Coordinates: 02°27′33″N 31°28′20″E

Route information
- Length: 133 mi (214 km)
- History: Designated 2001; Expected completion in TBD

Major junctions
- Southeast end: Karuma
- Olwiyo; Pakwach; Nebbi
- Northwest end: Arua

Location
- Country: Uganda

Highway system
- Roads in Uganda

The Karuma–Olwiyo–Pakwach–Nebbi–Arua Road is a road in the Northern Region of Uganda, connecting the towns of Karuma, Olwiyo, Pakwach, Nebbi and the city of Arua.

== Location ==
The road starts at Karuma, and proceeds in a northwesterly direction through Olwiyo, crossing the Albert Nile at Pakwach, going through Nebbi and ending at Arua, a distance of approximately 216 kilometres (134 mi), from end to end. However, the roadworks as contracted, measured 237 kilometres (147 mi).

== Upgrading to bitumen ==
In 2001, the government of Uganda borrowed US$64.5 million (USh100 billion at that time), from the International Development Association, to upgrade this road to class II bitumen surface, with drainage channels, culverts and shoulders. The work was completed in sections, starting with the Arua–Nebbi section, which was completed in December 2003. The paved road continues to undergo periodic maintenance and rehabilitation.

== Points of interest ==
- The beginning of the road at Karuma, lies approximately 2 kilometres (1 mi), by road from the location of Karuma Hydroelectric Power Station, the largest hydroelectric power project in Uganda to date.
- The section between Karuma and Olwiyo runs along the northern edge of Murchison Falls National Park.
- At Olwiyo, this road makes a T-junction with the Acholibur–Gulu–Olwiyo Road.
- The Pakwach Bridge on this road, is the fourth permanent bridge across River Nile in Uganda, the others being (1) the Source of the Nile Bridge (2) the Isimba Bridge and (3) the Karuma Bridge.

== See also ==
- List of roads in Uganda
- Transport in Uganda
- Vurra–Arua–Koboko–Oraba Road
