= Musingo =

- Map of Uganda showing the location of Musingo
- Coordinates: 03°46′17″N 33°11′59″E
- Country: Uganda
- Region: Northern Region of Uganda
- Sub-region: Acholi sub-region
- District: Lamwo District
- Elevation: 1,100 m (3,600 ft)
- Time zone: UTC+3 (EAT)

Musingo is a settlement in the Northern Region of Uganda at the international border with South Sudan.

== Location ==
The settlement is located approximately 67 kilometres (42 mi) northeast of Kitgum, the nearest large urban centre. This is about 86 kilometres (53 mi) northeast of Acholibur on the Rwekunye–Apac–Aduku–Lira–Kitgum–Musingo Road. The coordinates of Musingo are 3°46'17.0"N, 33°11'59.0"E (Latitude:3.771389; Longitude:33.199722).

== Points of interest ==
The following points of interest lie within the settlement or near its edges:

- offices of Musingo Town Council
- Musingo central market
- northern terminus of the 350 kilometres (217 mi) Rwekunye–Apac–Aduku–Lira–Kitgum–Musingo Road

== See also ==
- Lamwo District
- Acholi sub-region
- List of cities and towns in Uganda
- List of roads in Uganda
