= Karubanga Jacob =

Ugandan politician

Karubanga Jacob Atenyi
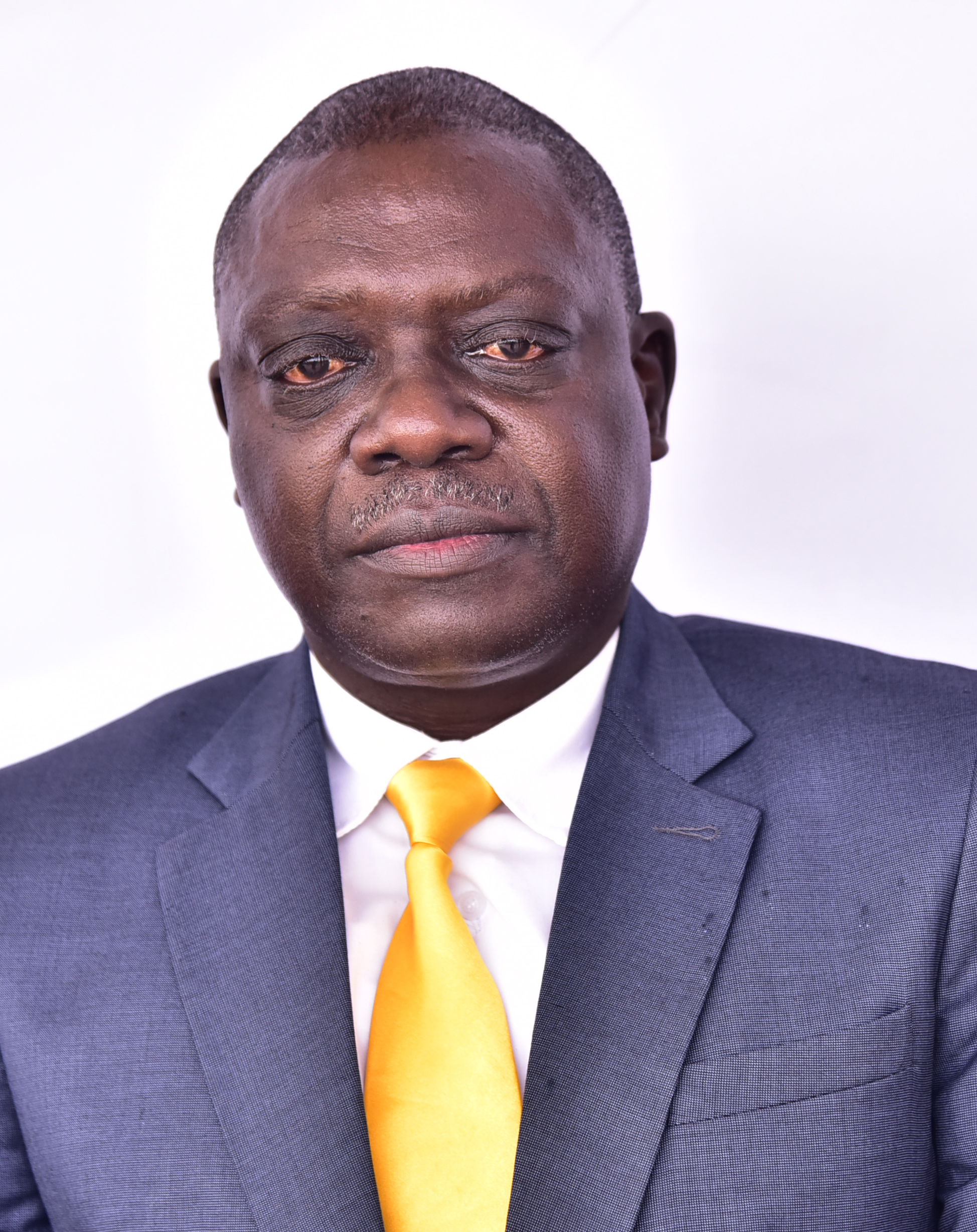

Member Of Parliament
- Incumbent
- Assumed office 2021
- President: YK Museveni
- Constituency: Kibanda South

Personal details
- Born: Kiryandongo

Karubanga Jacob Atenyi (born 15 October 1963) is a Ugandan politician and the current representative of Kibanda South County in the Parliament of Uganda and was formerly the Kigumba Town council mayor.

He served as the speaker of the Masindi District Council and later when Kiryandongo district was created, became the first Kigumba Town Council mayor in 2008.

He introduced a motion in Parliament to recognize the Maragoli as a Ugandan tribe, through tabling a private members bill as a motion in the Parliament of Uganda.

== Early life and education ==
Karubanga was born on 15 October 1963 in Kabukye Cell Ward B, Kigumba Town Council, Kiryandongo district. He went to Kizibu primary school where he completed his primary education (1973-1979). He joined Kibanda SS for S1 and 2 (1980-1981) before completing his O' Level at Kabalega SS in 1983. • He did his A' Level at Muntuyera High School, Kitunga- Ntungamo district (1984-1986). He was a teacher at Kibanda SS and Kigumba SS (1986-1998). He has a diploma in Project Planning and management, from Business Skills Trust, an affiliate of Uganda National Chamber of Commerce (2006-2008). Karubanga has a Bachelor's Degree in Development Studies from Bugema University (2008-2011).

== Career ==
Since 2013 to date, Karubanga has been an adjunct lecturer at Bugema University. He has worked as a consultant and promoter with Kigumba agribusiness Promotional Centre from 2013 to date. He served with Masindi and Kiryandongo district Local Government as General Secretary youth council Kibanda County, acting district chairperson, councillor, council speaker (May 2008-2011 and LC3 Chairperson Kigumba Town Council (2011-2016). He served as NRM secretary for Publicity for Kiryandongo district (2010-2015). He was the Chairperson Board of governors Kigumba SS (2007-2014). Between 2005 and 2010, he served as NRM secretary for Masindi district. From 1996 to date, he is the Chairperson Board of Directors Kigumba Complex Academy Primary School. Since 1993, he has been the director Kigumba Produce dealers and farmers association and director Kigumba Produce dealers and farmers Co. Ltd.
