= Emmy Wasirwa =

Ugandan biomedical engineer

- Born: 20 December 1972 (age 53)
- Citizenship: Uganda
- Education: Makerere University (Bachelor of Medicine and Bachelor of Surgery); Royal Tropical Institute (Diploma in Community Healthcare Management; University of East London (Master of Public Health); Queen Mary University of London (Bachelor of Engineering)
- Occupations: Public Health Specialist, Biomedical Engineer, Entrepreneur & Corporate Executive
- Years active: Since 2010
- Title: Executive Chairman.

Emmy Wasirwa (born 20 December 1972) in Uganda, is a biomedical engineer, public health specialist, entrepreneur and corporate executive, who is the founder and executive chairman of a clean-energy business, based in Kampala, Uganda's capital and largest city.

== Background and education ==
He was born in the Eastern Region of Uganda, on 20 December 1972. He trained as a medical doctor at Makerere University School of Medicine from 1983 until 1998. He spent 1999, performing his mandatory pre-licensing internship.

In 2000, he secured a scholarship from the Nuffic Foundation in the Netherlands, to study at the Royal Tropical Institute, graduating that same year, with a Diploma in Community Healthcare Management.

In 2002, he was admitted to the University of East London, graduating in 2004, with a Master of Public Health degree, in 2004. He went on to study at Queen Mary University of London, from 2005 until 2009, graduating with a Bachelor of Engineering degree in biomedical engineering. For a period of time in 2009, he worked as a research assistant at the Eindhoven University of Technology (TU/e), under the supervision of Dr. Nico Sommerdijk.

== Career ==
In 2008 Emmy Wasira co-founded Wana Energy Solutions Limited, that focuses on the distribution of liquefied petroleum gas (LPG), in Uganda's urban and rural areas, weaning clients off of the dependence on charcoal and firewood. As of January 2018, Wana Energy is he only Ugandan-owned gas supplier out of the 13 in the market. Emmy Wasira's efforts to promote LPG in Uganda has helped the industry to establish policy, safety standards, regulatory framework.

== Other considerations ==
Emmy Wasirwa is the chairperson of the Uganda Liquefied Petroleum Gas Association, an industry lobbying and business group.

== See also ==
- Philippa Ngaju Makobore
- Amy Jadesimi
