= Kahunde =

Kahunde is a surname. Notable people with the surname include:

- Hellen Kahunde, Ugandan parliamentarian
- Laura Kahunde, Ugandan performing artist and television presenter
