= StGiNU =

StGiNU (acronym for Stop the Genocide in Northern Uganda) is an advocacy group formed in the beginning of 2005 by Ugandans living in the United Kingdom. At that time, the situation in the concentration camps in Northern Uganda was claiming lives more than cross fire casualties. In the same year 2005, the Ugandan World Health Organization reported that there were 5000 excess deaths per week due to camp conditions alone.

Jan Egeland UN's Undersecretary General for Humanitarian Affairs stated that the Northern Uganda situation was worse than Iraq. Another UN representative Olara Otunnu said the situation in Northern Uganda was a secret genocide.

StGiNU group carried out their main public demonstration on the 16 April 2005 in Downing Street, and handed a petition to UK PM Tony Blair. Copies of the petition documents were later on sent to several governments including the United Nations office. The documents can be accessed here.

== History ==
Concentration camps in Northern Uganda started on a small scale when Yoweri Museveni took over power from the Ugandan president Tito Okello Lutwa in 1986. All civilians in the Acoli areas of Anaka, Agung, Purongo, Olwiyo etc. were rounded up by Museveni's soldiers then known as National Resistance Army, many civilians were murdered, the survivors were forcefully removed from their lands, put in army trucks and dumped in the Karuma area. By that time there were no rebel movements in the North, but the Ugandan army kept on uprooting people starting from March 1986. They looted livestock, burned food crops, carried out rapes and shot anyone found living in the villages.

In 1996 the Museveni's government ordered all civilians in Acoli sub-region to relocate into concentration camps. Their homes or properties were burned by helicopter gunships. The people were told that this was to 'protect' them against the Lord's Resistance Army (LRA) rebels.

In 2002, the population of some areas of Lira District in Lango sub-region were relocated into concentration camps. In 2003, this was done in some parts of Teso sub-region. By this time there were already various international Non-governmental organizations working in Uganda. Museveni had refused to declare the North a disaster area but allowed NGOs to work on strict conditions that they must publicize the activities of LRA rebels. The Ugandan army, now known as the Uganda People's Defence Force (UPDF), is accused of causing prolonged brutality on the civilian population, including recruitment of children and forceful displacements under the disguise of fighting the LRA. The LRA were also to blame for causing brutality on civilians but they were few and could not out-number the UPDF. The LRA carried out attacks in the North once in a while, but were based in South Sudan, not in Uganda.

It took much campaigning and international pressure asking Museveni to close the concentration camps and to reach agreements with the LRA rebels. On the 26 October 2006 the Museveni's government granted permission that civilians in the North of the country should return to their former villages after years of staying in concentration camps. This marked the beginning of the reconstruction of homes, roads, schools and so on. As a result, most civilians in the North have now returned to their former villages. However, many people died during the forceful relocations. And many civilians contracted diseases such as nodding disease, HIV etc.

== The Lord's Resistance Army ==
The world knew Joseph Kony and The Lord's Resistance Army as the main war culprits in Uganda, Democratic Republic of Congo, Central African Republic or South Sudan. Kony is also well known for abduction and recruitment of child soldiers.

== Land Grabbing in Amuru District ==
The motive behind displacement of the Acoli people in the North has become apparent that the Museveni's government is interested in grabbing lands from the civilian population. The UPDF Uganda People's Defence Force has carried out forceful evictions of the civilian from their lands. There have been rapes, fatalities and ethnic clashes over the land in Amuru district since the people were allowed to return to their former villages after the concentration camps.
