= Anaka General Hospital =

- Uganda Ministry of Health

Geography
- Location: Anaka, Nwoya District, Northern Region, Uganda
- Coordinates: 02°35′59″N 31°56′51″E

Organisation
- Care system: Public
- Type: General

Services
- Emergency department: I
- Beds: 120

History
- Founded: 1969

Links
- Other links: Hospitals in Uganda

Anaka General Hospital, also known as Anaka Hospital, is a hospital in the Northern Region of Uganda.

== Location ==
The hospital is in the town of Anaka in Nwoya District, approximately 55 kilometres (34 mi) south-west of the Gulu Regional Referral Hospital. This is about 321 kilometres (199 mi), by road, north-west of Mulago National Referral Hospital, The geographical coordinates of Anaka General Hospital are 02°35'59.0"N, 31°56'51.0"E (Latitude:2.599707; Longitude:31.947496).

== Overview ==
Anaka General Hospital was built in the 1960s during the administration of Prime Minister Milton Obote. During the Lord's Resistance Army insurgency, the hospital was attacked, ransacked, and vandalized.

The hospital suffers from dilapidated infrastructure, antiquated or non-existent equipment, poor funding, poor staffing, poor pay, late salary payments, and low staff morale. According to a 2012 published report, the hospital had gone several years without a physician or surgeon.

== Renovations ==
Beginning in 2014, the Uganda Ministry of Health began renovating this hospital, using a loan from the World Bank. The improvements, which cost UGX:18.65 billion, included the following: 1. New, bigger outpatients' department 2. Build a mortuary 3. Enlarge the private wing for paying patients 4. Renovate the existing staff housing 5. Renovate the hospital's water source 6. Rehabilitate the hospital's water supply pipe system, both outside and inside the facility 7. Rehabilitate the hospital's sewerage disposal system, both inside and outside the buildings 8. Construct an emergency room (casualty department) 9. Construct a psychiatric department 10. Build an intensive care unit.

== See also ==
- List of hospitals in Uganda
