= Rwekunye–Apac–Aduku–Lira–Kitgum–Musingo Road =

Road in Uganda

Coordinates: 02°22′27″N 34°16′17″E

Route information
- Length: 217.5 mi (350.0 km)
- History: Designation in 2015; Expected completion TBD

Major junctions
- South end: Rwekunye
- Apac; Lira; Acholibur; Kitgum
- North end: Musingo

Location
- Country: Uganda

Highway system
- Roads in Uganda

Rwekunye–Apac–Aduku–Lira–Kitgum–Musingo Road is a road in the Northern Region of Uganda, connecting the towns of Masindi Port in Kiryandongo District to Apac in Apac District, Lira in Lira District, Acholibur in Pader District, Kitgum in Kitgum District, and Musingo in Lamwo District at the international border with South Sudan.

== Location ==
The road starts at Rwekunye, a suburb of the town of Masindi Port, on the Kampala-Gulu highway, about 5 kilometres (3 mi) west of the Victoria Nile. The road continues through five northern Ugandan districts to end at Musingo, a distance of about 350 kilometres (217 mi). The coordinates of the road near Lira are 2°22'27.0"N, 32°56'04.0"E (Latitude:2.374167; Longitude:32.934444).

== Upgrading to bitumen ==
In 2009, the Ugandan government commissioned a feasibility study and a detailed engineering design for this road and for the 167 kilometres (104 mi) Acholibur–Gulu–Olwiyo Road, both in northern Uganda. The reports became available in 2013.

In February 2015, the upgrade from unsealed gravel surface to class II bitumen surface began. President Yoweri Museveni commissioned the start of the project on 21 February 2015. The work on the 86 kilometres (53 mi) from Acholibur to Musingo is assigned to Chongqing International Construction Corporation. Work is expected to last three years. The road project is fully funded by the Ugandan government. The work on the Rwekunye to Acholibur section of the road will be commissioned at a later date.

On 21 October 2020, President Museveni flagged off two other sections of the same road. The 91 kilometres (57 mi) Rwekunye–Apac section was awarded to Sadeem Al Kuwait General Trading & Contracting Company, of Kuwait. The Apac–Lira–Purang’a section, measuring 100.1 kilometres (62 mi)) was awarded to Gulsan Insaat Sanayi Turizm Nakliyat Ve Tecaret A.S. of Turkey. The budgeted cost of renovating these two sections is USh735 billion (approximately (US$201 million).

In February 2022, UNRA officials estimated the scope of work on this road as 80 percent complete.

== See also ==
- List of roads in Uganda
- Economy of Uganda
- Transport in Uganda
