= List of vocational colleges in Uganda =

This is a list of vocational colleges in Uganda. This list is not exhaustive.

- Redan Business and Vocational Institute, Makerere Kampala
- Ntinda Vocational Training Institute
- Uganda Petroleum Institute Kigumba
- Uganda Technical College, Kichwamba
- Bukalasa Agricultural Training Institute
- Uganda Technical College Elgon
- Uganda Technical College Bushenyi
- Uganda Technical College Lira
- Nakawa Vocational Training Institute
- Uganda Hotel and Tourism Training Institute
- Buganda Royal Institute of Business and Technical Education, Mengo
- Karera Technical Institute in Bushenyi District
- Nyamitanga Technical Institute in Mbarara District
- Rwentanga Farm Institute in Mbarara District
- Kitgum Technical Institute in Kitgum District
- Kalongo Technical Institute in Agago District
- Ora Technical Institute in Zombo District
- Butaleja Technical Institute in Butaleja District
- Kasodo Tehanical Institute in Pallisa District
- Kaliro Technical Institute in Kaliro District
- Ssese Farm Institute in Kalangala District
- Lake Katwe Training Institute in Kasese District
- Kaberamaido Technical Institute in Kaberamaido District
- Ogolai Technical Institute in Amuria
- Buhimba Technical Institute in Hoima
- Lwengo Technical Institute in Lwengo
- Namataba Technical Institute in Namataba
- Sasiira Technical Institute in Nakasongola
- Kilak Corner Technical Institute in Pader
- Arua Technical Institute Ragem in Arua City
- Lokopio Technical Institute in Yumbe.
- National Teachers College, Unyama in Gulu District
- National Teachers College, Muni in Arua
- National Teachers College, Mubende in Mubende
- Mende Community Vocational Institute
- National Teachers College, Kabale in Kabale
- National Teachers College, Kaliro in Kaliro
- St. Simon Vocational Institute Hoima, in Hoima
- Uganda Martyrs Polytechnic College Soroti, in Soroti City.
- Royal Academy of Art and Design in Jinja.

Rukungiri Technical Institute Kyamakanda
