= Judith Heard =

Ugandan fashion model (born 1986)

Judith Allen Heard
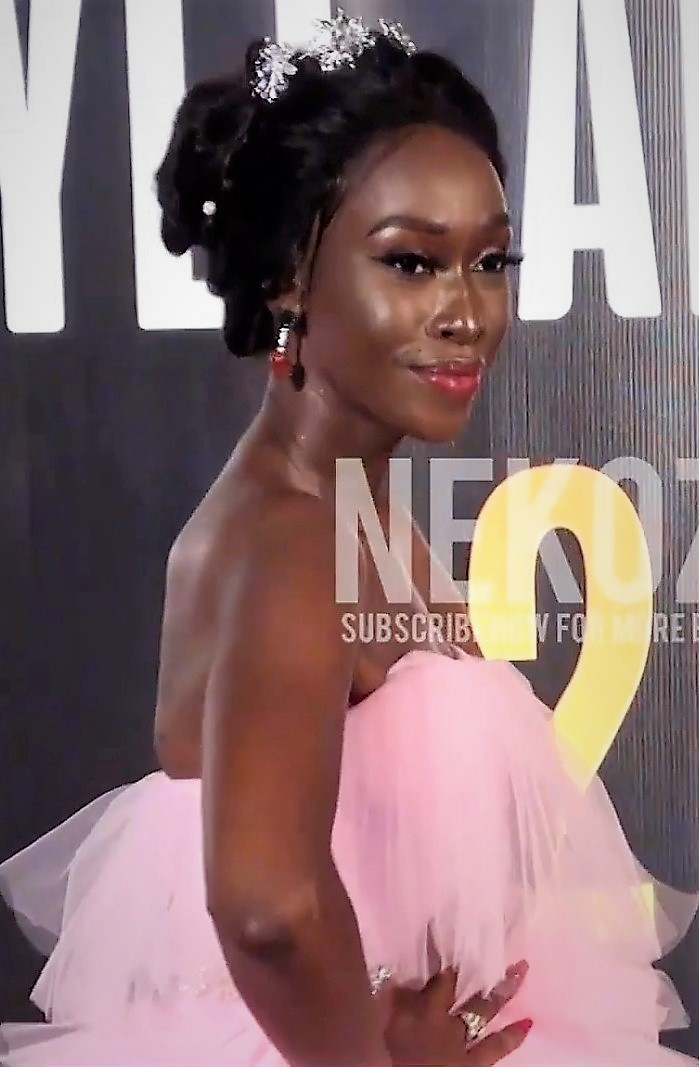
- Photo by Brian Muhumuza Bishanga / BM Publications 2019
- Born: Judith Heard; 13 March 1986 (age 40); Gulu, Uganda
- Citizenship: Uganda
- Occupations: Model, fashion designer
- Years active: 2002 - present
- Known for: Modelling, Tourism

Judith Allen Heard, commonly known as Judith Heard (born 13 March 1986), is a Ugandan fashion model, radio presenter, event host and environmental advocate. She is known for her modelling career and environmental work, including the 50 Million Trees for Africa campaign, which she launched through the Judith Heard Foundation.

She was crowned Miss Africa in Miss Elite Awards 2021 from Egypt, Miss Environment International Africa 2022 in Mumbai, India and Hollywood Green Carpet Fashion Awards’ Global Young Leader for her interplay between ecological action, civil rights, equality and global feminism in 2024.

== Background and education ==
She was born in 1986 in Gulu, Uganda to the Late. John Musana and Olive Night Bitature. Judith studied from Kampala Parents Primary School, Kigali Parents School, Fawe Girls Secondary School and later Ndera Secondary School in Kigali Rwanda.

== Career ==
Judith Heard is a model by profession. Judith moved to Uganda and started working with Sylivia Owori's modelling company and became the face of African Woman Magazine in 2002. She has taken part in different runways such as New York fashion week, Paris Fashion Week, Rwanda Collective Fashion Week, Abryanz Fashion style and Fashion awards. In September 2020, Judith Heard was invited to represent Uganda in Miss Elite Competitions 2020 in Egypt.

Judith Heard at the Abryanz Style and Fashion Awards 2022

== Personal life ==
Judith Heard married Richard Heard in 2003 and they divorced in 2014. She is a mother of 3; Brandon Richard Heard, Branda Jolie Heard and Briana Bella Heard.

== Other considerations ==
In February 2019, Judith launched Day One Global an advocacy organisation that seeks to curb Sexual harassment and rape among women. She has worked with Sanyu babies home in Kampala.

== Nominations and awards ==
| Year | Award | Category | Nominee(s) | Result | Ref. |
|---|---|---|---|---|---|
| 2015 | Abryanz Style And Fashion Awards | Most Stylish Female of the Year | Judith Heard | Won | |
| 2016 | Reel African Hero | Hero of the month | Judith Heard | Won | |
| 2016 | Abryanz Style And Fashion Awards | Most Stylish Female of the Year | Judith Heard | Nominated | |
| 2017 | Starqt Awards | Best Dressed Female Lady | Judith Heard | Nominated | |
| 2017 | Abryanz Style And Fashion Awards | Most Stylish Female Celebrity of the Year | Judith Heard | Nominated | |
| 2018 | Abryanz Style And Fashion Awards | Most Stylish Female Celebrity of the Year | Judith Heard | Nominated | |
| 2021 | Miss Elite Awards | Miss Africa | Judith Heard | Won | |
| 2022 | Miss Environment International | India | Won | | |
