= Nwoya =

- Location in Uganda
- Coordinates: 02°38′06″N 32°00′00″E
- Country: Uganda
- Region: Northern Region of Uganda
- Sub-region: Acholi sub-region
- District: Nwoya District
- Elevation: 3,250 ft (990 m)

Population (2021 Estimate)
  - Total: 4,295

Nwoya is a town in Nwoya District in the Acholi sub-region, in the Northern Region of Uganda. It is the main municipal, administrative, and commercial centre of the district. Nwoya Town Council is classified as a municipality.

== Location ==
Nwoya is on the main Gulu-Arua road, approximately 44 kilometres (27 mi) southwest of Gulu, the largest city in the Acholi sub-region. This is approximately 330 kilometres (205 mi), by road, northwest of Kampala, the capital and largest city of Uganda.

The coordinates of the town are 2°38'06.0"N, 32°00'00.0"E (Latitude:2.6350; Longitude:32.0000). Nwoya Town lies at an average elevation of 990 metres (3,250 ft) above sea level.

== Population ==
As of September 2021, the population, within a 7 kilometres (4 mi) radius of the town centre of Nwoya Municipality is estimated at 4,295.

== Overview ==
Several points of interest lie within or close to the town limits, including the following: (a) the headquarters of Nwoya District Administration (b) the offices of Nwoya Town Council (c) Nwoya central market, the source of daily fresh produce and (d) the Acholibur–Gulu–Olwiyo Road, arriving into town from Gulu in a north-south direction and leaves towards Olwiyo in a northeast-southwest direction.

== Challenges ==
Nwoya Town faces many challenges, including: (1) inadequate garbage collection and disposal (2) insufficient of public toilets downtown (3) inability to restrict roaming of domestic cows, goats, sheep, chicken and ducks (4) inadequate water supply (5) lack of public street lighting (6) inadequate security at night (7) lack of public municipal drainage (8) poor road network and (9) noise pollution.

== See also ==
- Acholi people
- List of cities and towns in Uganda
- List of roads in Uganda
