= Catherine Kyobutungi =

Ugandan epidemiologist

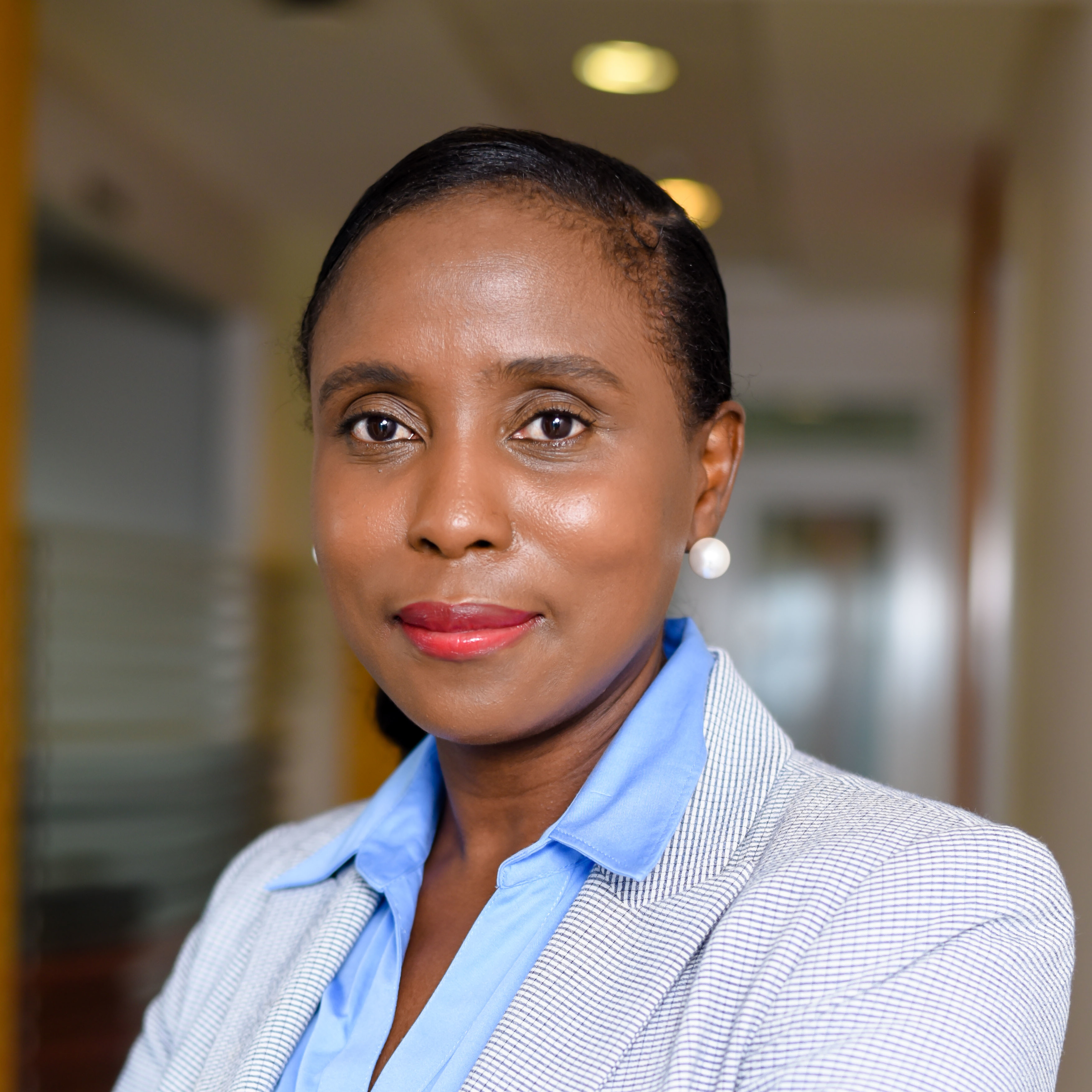
- Catherine Kyobutungi by Billy Miaron
- Born: 7 January 1972 (age 54); Gulu in Uganda
- Education: Makerere University; Ruprecht Karl University of Heidelberg (master's degree in community health) (doctoral degree in epidemiology)
- Scientific career
- Workplaces: Mbarara University of Science and Technology
- Thesis: Ethnic German Immigrants from the Former Soviet Union: Mortality from External Causes and Cancers (2008)

Catherine Kyobutungi (born 1972) is a Ugandan epidemiologist who currently serves as the Executive Director of the African Population and Health Research Center (APHRC) and a Joep Lange Chair at the University of Amsterdam. She was elected to the African Academy of Sciences in 2018.

== Early life and education ==
Kyobutungi was born in 1972 in Gulu in Uganda. She started her medical course at Makerere University in 1990. After graduating in 1996 she worked as a medical officer at Rushere Community Hospital. Kyobutungi moved from clinical medicine to public health because she felt she could save more lives by correcting the African healthcare system. She earned a master's degree in community health and a doctoral degree in epidemiology from the Ruprecht Karl University of Heidelberg in 2002. Her doctoral research was based in the Department of Tropical Hygiene and Public Health supervised by Prof. Dr. rer. nat. Heiko Becher. In 2006 Kyobutungi joined the African Population and Health Research Center as a postdoctoral fellow, and was eventually selected as the Head of the Challenges and Systems research program. After graduating Kyobutungi began to teach at the Mbarara University of Science and Technology.

== Research and career ==
In October 2017, Kyobutungi was made the Director of Research at the African Population and Health Research Center (APHRC). In this capacity she evaluated maternal health and well being challenges in African cities. Kyobutungi looked to strengthen governance in local health services, as well as providing training, infrastructure and equipment. Whilst African researchers in these local health centers can generate large amounts of useful health data, they often do no have the capacities to analyse it. Kyobutungi has described unused African research data as being like a hippo, "at the moment we can only see and access a very small amount – like the ears of a hippo in water – but we know there is a huge potential lying just below the surface".

She was made of Executive Director of the APHRC in 2017. Here her work has considered the epidemiology of cardiovascular disease, prevalence of diabetes in poor urban communities and ways to prevent cardiovascular diseases in Nairobi slums. She was the inaugural Chair of the Kenya Epidemiological Association. Kyobutungi has made efforts to improve girls' access to education, including the development of community resources and trained mentors.

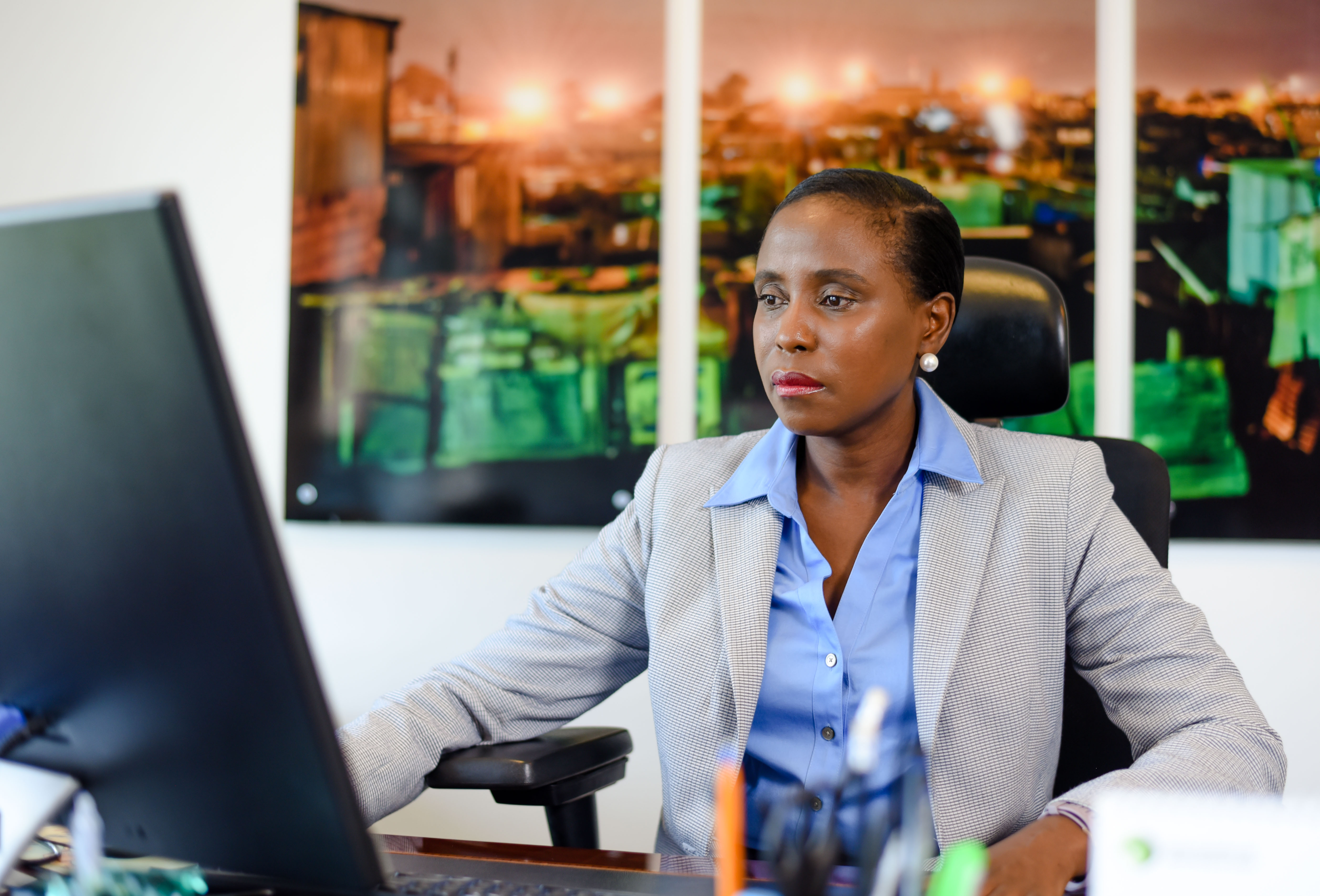
Catherine Kyobutungi

In 2019 Kyobutungi was announced as the Joep Lange Chair, a position in which she investigates non-communicable diseases in African countries. Non-communicable diseases are rising in African countries, and current healthcare systems are not equipped to treat populations affected by them. The focus of foreign money and training to date has been on HIV/AIDS, malaria and tuberculosis, which means that simple medical tests such as measuring blood pressure often get overlooked. Kyobutungi supported health workers to visit local communities with blood pressure cuffs to monitor for hypertension. She found that to encourage patient and doctor participation she had to include an economic incentive, offering 100 schillings for every screened patient who visits the clinic. Alongside establishing a research program investigating the management of chronic diseases and ways to strengthen healthcare systems, Kyobutungi is exploring the role of digital technology in connecting patients with their healthcare systems. She has studied the influence of the WHO Framework Convention on Tobacco Control on tobacco legislation in Sub-Saharan Africa.

Kyobutungi serves on the council of the United States International University Africa. She also serves as director of the Consortium for Advanced Research Training in Africa (CARTA), an organisation which looks to rebuild and strengthen the capacity of African universities. She was elected to the African Academy of Sciences in 2018.

Since 2019, Kyobutungi has been a member of the Lancet–SIGHT Commission on Peaceful Societies Through Health and Gender Equality, chaired by Tarja Halonen.

Kyotobungi is a founding co-Editor-in-Chief of PLOS Global Public Health, an open-access journal that addresses deeply entrenched inequities and makes impactful research visible and accessible to health professionals, policy-makers, and local communities without barriers. She continues to serve in that role.

== Other activities ==
- Partnership for Maternal, Newborn & Child Health (PMNCH), Member of the Board
