= Uganda Technical College, Kichwamba =

Coordinates: 00°42′52″N 30°11′28″E

- Type: Public
- Established: 1947
- Chairperson: Dr. Moses Twesigye-Omwe
- Students: 654 (2010)
- Location: Kichwamba, Kabarole District, Uganda
- Campus: Rural

Uganda Technical College, Kichwamba, also referred to as Kichwamba Technical College, is a government-owned, institution of tertiary education in the field of engineering, offering diploma courses.

== Location ==
The institute is located approximately 15 kilometres (9 mi), by road, northwest of the city of Fort Portal, in Kabarole District, in the Western Region of Uganda. This location lies approximately 310 kilometres (190 mi), by road, west of Kampala, Uganda's capital and largest city.

== History ==
The institution was established in 1947, as a resettlement of World War II veterans and as an Artisan Training Centre. In 1971, it was upgraded to the level of technical institute and in 1983, it became a technical college.

== Kichwamba massacre ==
On 8 June 1998, rebels affiliated with the terrorist group Allied Democratic Front (ADF) attacked the college and set three dormitories of fire, killing 80 students. The ADF abducted another 100 students and destroyed other property including laboratories and school vehicles.

With the help of the Government of Uganda, the Netherlands Organisation for International Cooperation in Higher Education (Nuffic), Hanze University, Kyambogo University, Mountains of the Moon University and the Government of the Netherlands, the college recovered and, by 2010, had increased its student population to over 650.

== See also ==
- ADF Insurgency
- Ugandan Universities
- Education in Uganda
- Ugandan Vocational Colleges
