= Philippa Ngaju Makobore =

Ugandan electrical engineer and academic

- Citizenship: Uganda
- Education: University of Alberta (Bachelor of Science in electrical engineering); University of California, Irvine' (Certificate in embedded systems engineering
- Occupation: Electrical engineer
- Years active: Since 2008
- Title: Department Head of the instrumentation division at the Uganda Industrial Research Institute

Philippa Ngaju Makobore is a Ugandan electrical engineer. She is the head of the instrumentation division at the Uganda Industrial Research Institute (UIRI).

== Early life and education ==
Makobore studied at Gayaza High School but graduated from a high school in Canada. In 2008, she earned a Bachelor of Science in electrical engineering from the University of Alberta Faculty of Engineering in Edmonton, Canada. She also earned a professional certificate in embedded systems engineering from the University of California, Irvine, United States.

== Career ==
From 2009 until 2010, Makobore served as an intern telecommunications engineer at MTN Group. She then worked as a sales engineer.

In early 2011, she joined UIRI and later became the head of its instrumentation division. The division is regularly invited to give oral presentations at medical engineering conferences, including the Canadian Medical and Biological Engineering Conference, the World Congress for Biomedical Engineering and Medical Physics, and the Institute of Electrical and Electronics Engineers. She once was a session chair for the medical devices track at the World Congress. At UIRI, Makobore focuses on the design and development of electronic applications. Her team works on health care, agriculture, and energy projects. Some of these projects have won local and international awards. At UIRI, she has also built partnerships with Columbia University in New York City, Makerere University in Kampala, Addis Ababa University, and the Mbarara University of Science and Technology.

In 2017, Makobore entered the Innovation Prize for Africa with the electronically controlled gravity feed infusion set (ECGF). The ECGF won the second prize (US$25,000). In east Africa, more than 10 percent of children admitted to hospital need IV therapy. Over-infusion in children increases the absolute risk of death by 3.3 percent at 48 hours. The ECGF controls the flow rate of intravenous fluids.

== Awards ==
- 2016: First place Innovation Award at the 2016 World Patient Safety, Science, and Technology Summit
- 2017: Second place Innovation Prize for Africa

== See also ==
- Kwatsi Alibaruho
- Brian Mushana Kwesiga
