= Masindi Port =

Ugandan town

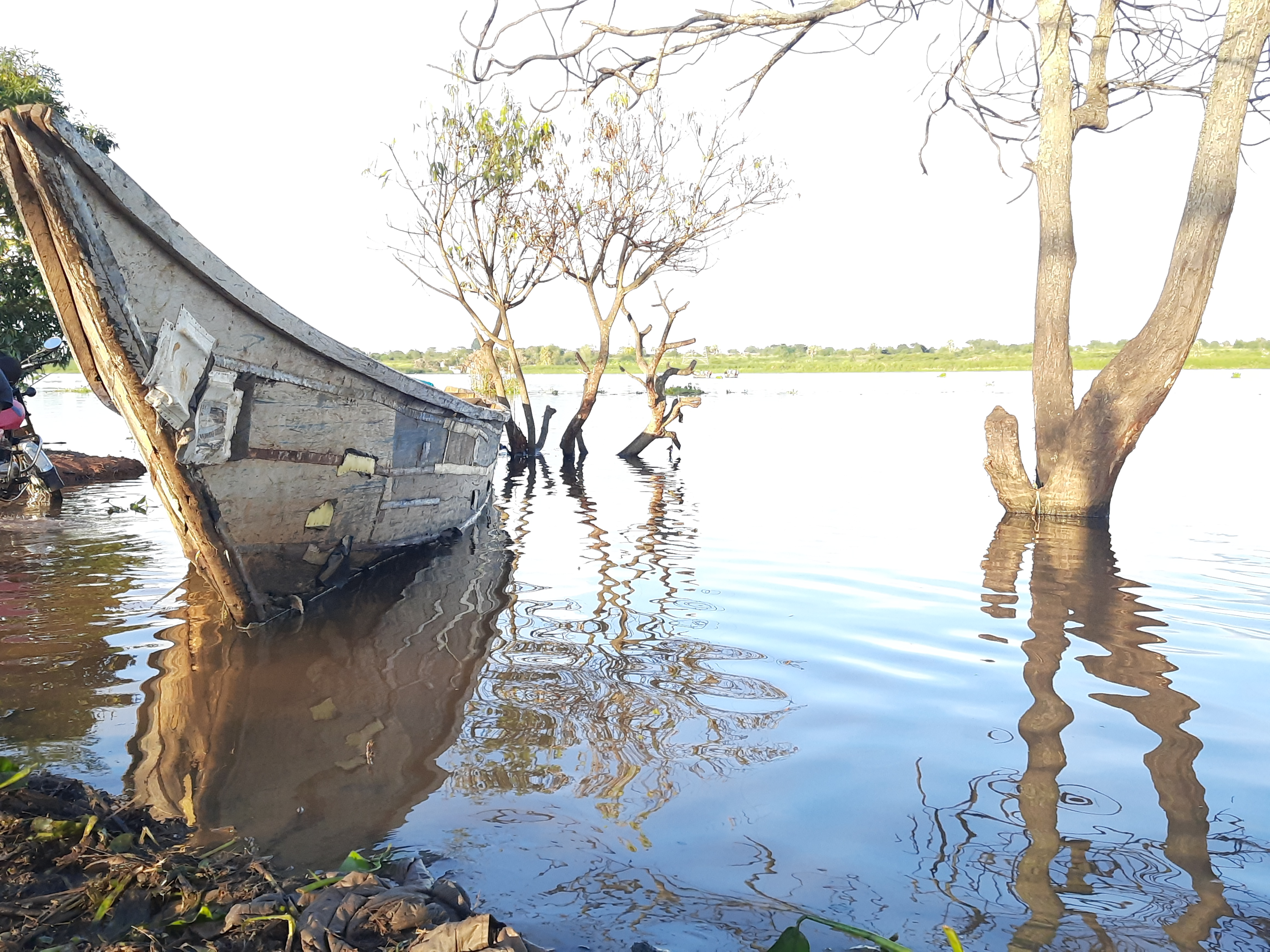
- Boat waiting for passenger at Masindi Port

- Map of Uganda showing the location of Masindi Port.
- Coordinates: 01°41′54″N 32°04′40″E
- Country: Uganda
- District: Kiryandongo District
- Elevation: 1,040 m (3,410 ft)

Population (2020 Estimate)
  - Total: 10,400
- Time zone: UTC+3 (EAT)

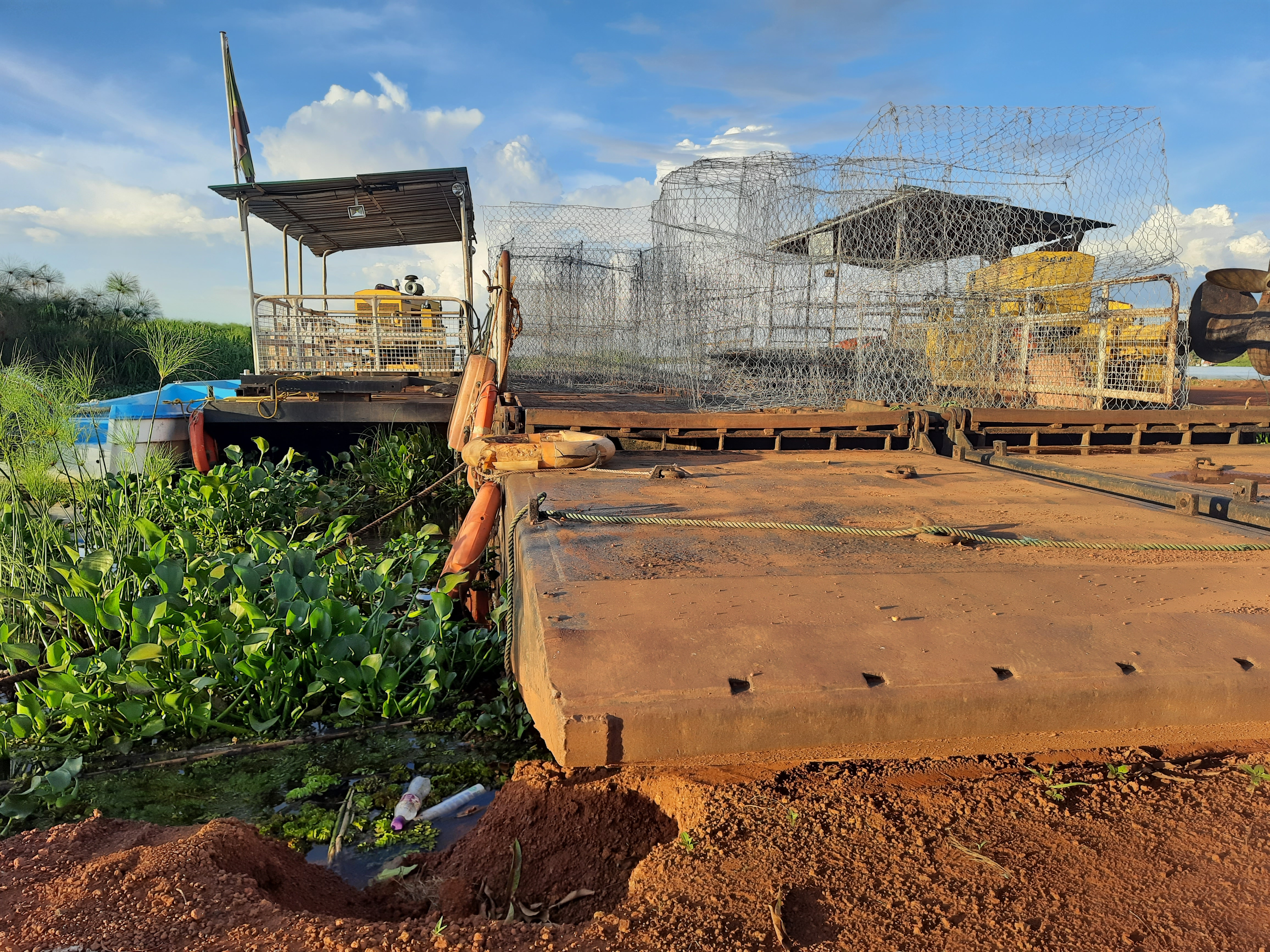
Ferry at Masindi Port

Masindi Port is a town in the Western Region of Uganda. The name also applied to the sub-county, where the own sits and forms the sub-county headquarters.

== Location ==
Masindi Port is located in Kiryandongo District in the Western Region of Uganda, along the western banks of the Victoria Nile, approximately 194 kilometres (121 mi), by road, northwest of Kampala, Uganda's capital and largest city.

This is approximately 49 kilometres (30 mi), by road, south of Kiryandongo, the district capital. The geographical coordinates of Masindi Port are 1°41'54.0"N, 32°04'40.0"E (Latitude:1.6983;, 32.0778).

== Overview ==
Masindi Port was a busy river boat docking station during the late 19th and early 20th centuries. Steamboats were a major mode of transport on the Nile River. Because of the Karuma Falls and the Murchison Falls on the Victoria Nile between Lake Kyoga and Lake Albert, steamboats could not navigate that part of the Nile. Passengers would travel by boat from Lake Victoria, down the Victoria Nile into Lake Kyoga. They would then disembark at Masindi Port and travel by land to Butiaba, a port on Lake Albert, where they would resume their water journey downstream the Nile. With the decline of this mode of river transportation, Masindi Port and Butiaba have been reduced to mainly market towns.

== Population ==
In 2009, the Uganda Bureau of Statistics (UBOS) estimated the population of Masindi Port at about 10,400.

In 2015, UBOS estimated the town's population at 9,100 people. In 2020, the population agency estimated the mid-year population of Masindi Port at 10,400. Of these, 5,500 (52.9 percent) were males and 4,900 (47.1 percent) were females. UBOS calculated the population growth rate of the town to average 2.7 percent annually, between 2015 and 2020.

Historical population
Year	Pop.	±%
2009	10,400	—
2015	9,100	−12.5%
2020	10,400	+14.3%

== See also ==
- List of cities and towns in Uganda
- Rwekunye–Apac–Aduku–Lira–Kitgum–Musingo Road
