= Zhongmei =

Chinese construction & engineering firm

Jiangxi Zhongmei Engineering Construction Co., Ltd.
- Headquarters: Nanchang, Jiangxi, China
- Website: Department of Commerce of Jiangxi Province entry on company

Jiangxi Zhongmei Engineering Construction is a Chinese construction and engineering firm in the construction fields of roads, housing, public works, urban rail, mines, and hydropower as well as the installation of mechanical and electrical equipment and geological exploration. In overseas projects it is active in Kenya, Ethiopia, Ghana, Liberia, Togo, Namibia and Zambia. With 2012 revenue of $367 million from international projects, it was listed in 2013 by Engineering News-Record as the 164th largest international project contractor.

It is the construction contractor in two Kenyan road projects that are designed as part of a development plan for a multi-country corridor. In 2009 it was awarded by the Kenya National Highways Authority in a project funded by African Development Bank to build the Marsabit-Turbi road, which will form a segment of a link between Addis Ababa and Mombasa. The road is also a segment in the much far reaching Cairo – Cape Town Highway.

It was again awarded by the Kenya National Highways Authority in 2012 a contract, this time to develop the Webuye-Kitale highway, a project worth 3.3 billion Kenyan shillings. The World Bank funded project is to form part of the Kisumu to Kitale road, which is important to commerce in western Kenya and for regional integration with South Sudan and Uganda.

In Liberia, Zhongmei constructed 50 water wells fitted with hand pumps in the counties of Bomi, Montserrado and Margibi in a project funded as aid by the government of China. The President of Liberia Ellen Johnson Sirleaf dedicated the project in a ceremony in 2013.
