= Bukalasa Agricultural Training Institute =

Public school in Wobulenzi, Uganda

Location
- Wobulenzi, Luweero District; Uganda
- Coordinates: 00°42′49″N 32°30′36″E

Information
- Type: Public
- Established: 1920 (age 105–106)
- Faculty: 60+ (2018)
- Enrollment: 2000+ (2023)
- Colour: Green
- Nickname: BAC
- Alumni: General Katumba Wamala Edward
- Website: www.bac.ac.ug

Bukalasa Agricultural Training Centre (BATI), also Bukalasa Agricultural College, is a public vocational training institute operated and administered by the Uganda Ministry of Agriculture Animal Industry and Fisheries (MAAIF).see www.bac.ac.ug

== Location ==
The institute is located in the neighborhood of Bukalasa, approximately 3.5 kilometres (2 mi), Bukalasa is approximately 50 kilometres (31 mi), by road, north of Kampala, the capital and largest city of Uganda. The geographical coordinates of the institute are:0°19'49.0"N, 32°36'06.0"E (Latitude:0.330278; Longitude:32.601667).

== Overview ==
The institute was established by the government of Uganda in 1920, as a cotton research centre. Over the years, through mergers with other institutions, the centre was transformed into a comprehensive agricultural research and training institute. In 1952, BATI began offering a two-year certificate course and a diploma course was introduced in 1960. The two main challenges that face the institution are insufficient classrooms and insufficient mechanized equipment for use in teaching modern agricultural methods.

== Courses ==
The institute offers the following courses:

Diploma courses

(a) Diploma in Crop Production and Management (b) Diploma in Animal Production and Management (c) Diploma in Agribusiness Management (d) Diploma in Floriculture.

Certificate courses

(a) Certificate in Crop Production and Management (b) Certificate in Animal Production and Management (c) Certificate in Floriculture and (d) Certificate in Apiary.

== See also ==
- List of schools in Uganda
- List of universities in Uganda
- List of vocational colleges in Uganda
