= Nakawa Vocational Training Institute =

Location
- Kampala; Uganda
- Coordinates: 00°19′56″N 32°37′04″E

Information
- Type: Public
- Religious affiliation: N/A
- Established: 1971 (age 54–55)
- Fred Muwanga: Principal

Nakawa Vocational Training Institute (NVTI), is a public vocational training institute operated and administered by the Uganda Ministry of Education and Sports (MoES).

== Location ==
The institute is located in the neighborhood of Nakawa, in the Nakawa Division of Kampala, Uganda's capital city and largest city. It is off of the Kampala-Jinja Road, approximately 5.5 kilometres (3 mi), east of the central business district of the city. The geographical coordinates of the institute are: 0°19'56.0"N, 32°37'04.0"E (Latitude:0.332222; Latitude:32.617778).

== Overview ==
The government of Uganda established this institute in 1971, in collaboration with the government of Japan through the Japan International Cooperation Agency (JICA). The institute's primary objective is the provision of "vocational training skills to school leavers and apprentices in enterprises and to upgrade and assess competencies of industrial workers".

Training is in three major areas, (a) electric factory automation and programmable logical control (b) electronic digital technology and (c) automotive electronic fuel injection.

Beginning in 2007, a program for the training of vocational skills instructors was established. This program is dubbed "Instructor Training for Vocational Education Training" (ITVET). The institute's courses have attracted participants from Uganda and the neighboring countries, including Kenya, Tanzania, Zambia and Eritrea.

== Courses ==
Available courses to school leavers and apprentices include: (1) Electricity, (2) motor vehicle mechanics and (3) metal fabrication (4) carpentry (5) plumbing (6) welding and metal fabrication (7) masonry and brick-laying/brick fabrication (8) automotive engine repair. In 2017, the institute began instruction in a new course called "mechatronics", combining mechanical engineering and electronic engineering. Another new course started at the institution is information communication technology (ICT), bringing the number of courses at the institute to ten. Courses are offered at certificate and diploma levels. as of 2018, the institute admitted the first 20 students for each of their new diploma programs. The diploma courses introduced are Vocational Diploma in Electrical Electronics engineering and Diploma in Automotive engineering. These are two of the more expected diploma courses to be added at the institute.

== See also ==
- List of schools in Uganda
- Uganda Industrial Research Institute
- List of vocational colleges in Uganda
