= Lira–Kamdini–Karuma Road =

Road in Uganda

Route information
- Length: 50 mi (80 km)
- History: Designated in 2008; Completed in 2011

Major junctions
- East end: Lira
- Kamdini
- West end: Karuma

Location
- Country: Uganda

Highway system
- Roads in Uganda

The Lira–Kamdini–Karuma Road, also known as the Karuma–Kamdini–Lira Road, is a road in the Northern Region of Uganda, connecting the town of Lira, in Lira District, with the towns of Kamdini and Karuma, both in Oyam District.

== Route description ==
The road starts at Lira, the largest town in the Lango sub-region, and continues westwards through Kamdini, where it takes a southwesterly direction to end at Karuma, a distance of approximately 80 kilometres (50 mi). The road is part of the Tororo to Arua and the Tororo to Juba transportation corridors. The coordinates of the road near Kamdini are 2°13'43.0"N, 32°20'08.0"E (Latitude:2.228599; Longitude:32.335545).

== History ==
The road was upgraded to class II bitumen surface with shoulders and drainage channels during the three years leading up to August 2011 when work was competed. The total road length was quoted as 88 kilometres (55 mi). The work extended to Karuma Bridge itself.

== See also ==
- List of roads in Uganda
- Transportation in Uganda
- Economy of Uganda
- Uganda National Roads Authority
