= Ronald Reagan Okumu =

Ugandan politician

Ronald Reagan Okumu is a Ugandan politician and an intellectual PhD. in Global Leadership and Change[ PepperdineUniversity], MA New York University, BA.SS.Makerere University and Associate Arts in Political Science, Uganda Martyrs University. He served Parliament of Uganda as a member of parliament from Aswa County, Commissioner of Parliament of Uganda, ChairmanPublic Accounts Committeeof COSASE, ChairmanPublic Accounts Local Government, Deputy ChairmanPresidentialand Foreign Affairs committee, Member of Presidential Peace Team, National Ebola Task Force, and EAC National Task Force Member. He is a member of Forum for Democratic Change and serves as the vice president of the party for North region.

== Political career ==
Okumu was elected to the parliament in 1996 and 2001 on no party democracy in Uganda, 2006 and 2011 on the ticket of the Forum for Democratic Change until 2016 election when the Electoral Commission influenced thy NRM ruling party, removed FDC symbol from the national ballot paper to confuse voters so that he does not win his parliamentary seat and assigned him an, but he was elected with a landslide despite the last minute confusion.

His election was challenged in court by an alleged FDC candidate Christopher Acire who alleged irregularities in the electoral process that Okumu used party symbols and colors in his election. The case ended in favour of Okumu who served out his term in the parliament. He lost his parliamentary seat in the 2021 election for the first time since 1996. He was defeated in contraversal elections in 2021 by National Resistance Movement (NRM) candidate Simon Wokorach who allegedly scored about 14,000 votes to Okumu's 2,200 votes.

In April 2005, he was arrested together with Michael Nyeko Ocula for the suspected murder of Alfred Bongomin. Later, they were acquitted. It is suspected the charges were fabricated to eliminate opposition politicians, as Okumu had challenged the NRM no party system in the Constitutional Court of Uganda leading to multiparty that led to him forming the FDC party in 2005. Muhammad Ssegirinya and Allan Ssewanyana.
