= Uganda Industrial Research Institute =

Government organization in Kampala, Uganda

Coordinates: 00°20′10″N 32°37′31″E

- Company type: Parastatal
- Industry: Industrial research
- Founded: 2003
- Headquarters: Nakawa, Kampala, Uganda
- Key people: Charles Kwesiga; Executive Director
- Products: Electrical gadgets, paper and wood products, farm implements and others
- Website: Homepage

The Uganda Industrial Research Institute (UIRI) is a parastatal company, wholly owned by the government of Uganda, whose primary objective is to carry out scientific and industrial research, develop competitive technical services, improve the capacity and competence of indigenous entrepreneurs to embark on sustainable industrial production, to produce high quality marketable products, for the benefit of Uganda's citizens.

== Location ==
The Institute is located in the industrial area of the neighborhood of Nakawa, in the Nakawa Division of the city of Kampala, approximately 6.5 kilometres (4 mi), by road, east of the city center, off of the Kampala–Jinja Highway. The geographical coordinates of the institution's campus are: 0°20'10.0"N, 32°37'31.0"E (Latitude:0.336111; Longitude:32.625278).

== Overview ==
UIRI was established by Act of Parliament in 2002, which was assented to and signed into law by the president of Uganda on 30 July 2003. It is organised under the Uganda Ministry of Trade, Industry and Cooperatives. It is divided into several divisions and departments, and is led by an executive director, currently Charles Kwesiga.

One of the successes that UIRI has achieved is the award-winning invention of the ECGF (Electronically Controlled Gravity Feed Infusion Set), which controls the rate of fluid flow of intravenous (IV) fluids to prevent under-infusion or over-infusion. The research was led by Philippa Ngaju Makobore, an electrical engineer trained in Canada, the United States and South Africa.

As of 2014, the institute was plagued by underfunding and duplication of services by other government agencies.

== See also ==
- Uganda Investment Authority
- Healthcare in Uganda
- Nakawa Vocational Training Institute
