= Acholibur =

- Location in Uganda; Placement on map is approximate
- Coordinates: 03°08′37″N 32°54′49″E
- Country: Uganda
- Region: Northern Region of Uganda
- District: Pader District
- Municipality: Acholibur
- Elevation: 3,810 ft (1,160 m)

Acholibur is a town in Pader District in the Northern Region of Uganda.

== Location ==
Acholibur is approximately 19 kilometres (12 mi) south of Kitgum, the nearest large urban centre. The coordinates of Acholibur are 03°08'37.0"N, 32°54'49.0"E (Latitude:3.143611; Longitude:32.913611).

== Points of interest ==
These are some of the points of interest in or near Acholibur:

- offices of the Acholibur Town Council
- headquarters of the Acholibur sub-county
- northern end of the Acholibur–Gulu–Olwiyo Road
- Rwekunye–Apac–Aduku–Lira–Kitgum–Musingo Road, passing through town in a generally north/south direction

== See also ==
- List of cities and towns in Uganda
- List of roads in Uganda
