= Mapenduzi Ojara =

Ugandan journalist and politician

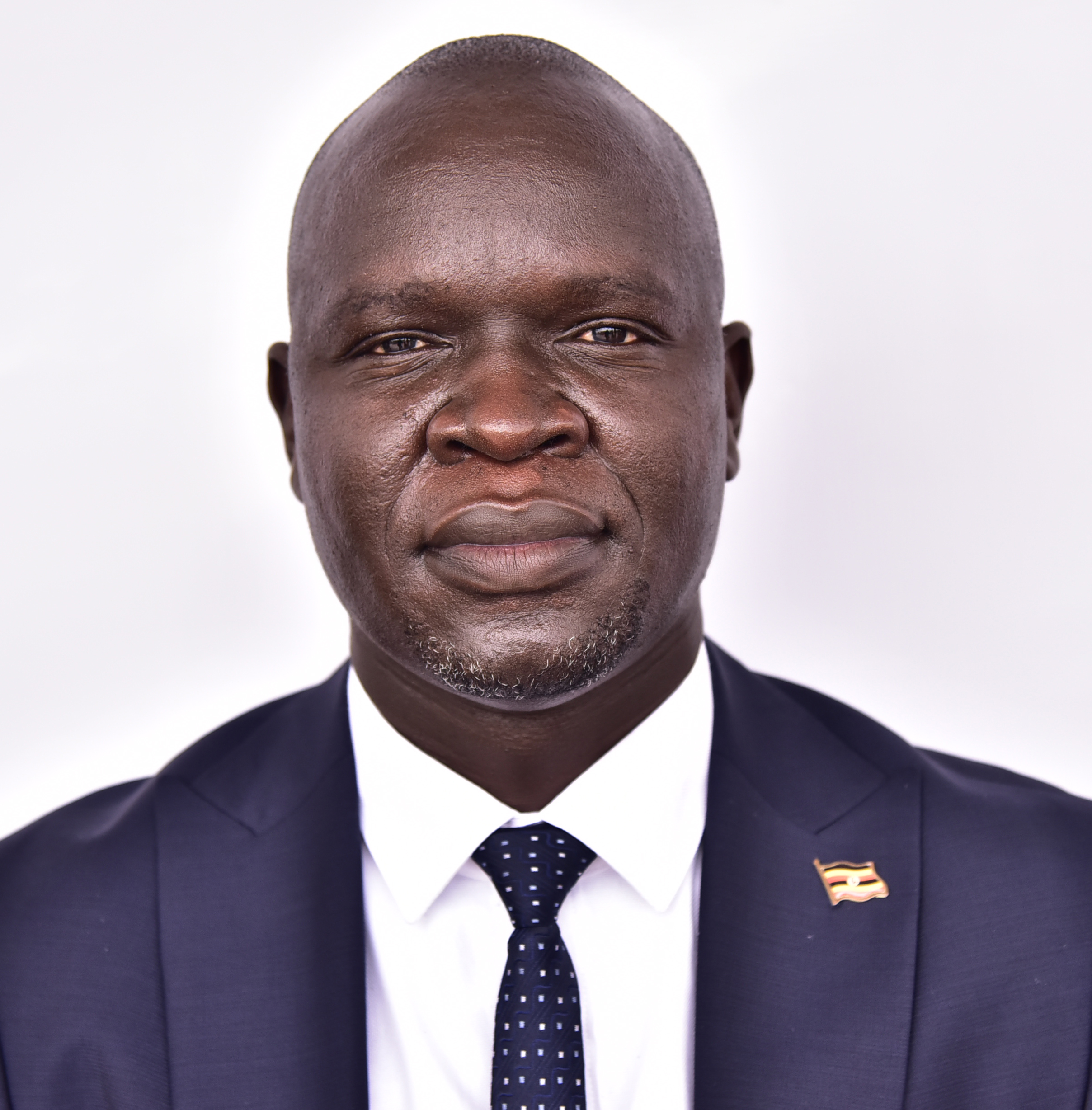
Ojara Martin Mapenduzi.jpg

Ojara Martin Mapenduzi is a Ugandan journalist, politician and member of the Parliament representing Gulu West (Bardege-Layibi Division). He previously served as the Chairman of the Gulu District Local Government.

== Early life and education ==
Ojara was born in a family of 18 children. He received his Bachelor of Education degree from Gulu University, and taught literature at Gulu Central School as a part-time teacher. Thereafter he began practicing journalism working with Choice FM in Gulu and rose to the position of News Editor and Program Manager in two years.

== Political career ==
Ojara became active in politics in 2006, when he contested and won the councillorship seat for Bardege Ward in the Gulu Municipality and became speaker of the house. In 2023, he was elected Chairman of the Gulu District local council, where he served until 2021 when he was elected to the national parliament in Gulu West. In the parliament, he was appointed Chairperson of the Local Government Accounts committee by the major opposition party in the parliament, National Unity Platform, NUP.
