= Nwoya District =

- District
- District location in Uganda
- Coordinates: 02°38′N 32°00′E
- Country: Uganda
- Region: Northern Uganda
- Sub-region: Acholi sub-region
- Established: 1 July 2010
- Capital: Nwoya

Area
  - Total: 4,736.2 km^{2} (1,828.7 sq mi)

Population (2012 Estimate)
  - Total: 54,000
  - Density: 11.4/km^{2} (30/sq mi)
- Time zone: UTC+3 (EAT)
- Website: www.nwoya.go.ug

Nwoya District is a district in Northern Uganda. Like most districts in Uganda, it is named after its main municipal, administrative and commercial center, Nwoya, the location of the district headquarters.

== Location ==
Nwoya District is bordered by Amuru District to the north, Gulu District to the north-east, Oyam District to the east, Kiryandongo District to the south-east, Masindi District to the south, and Buliisa District to the south-west. Nwoya, the main political, administrative and commercial center in the district, is approximately 44 kilometres (27 mi) south-west of the city of Gulu, the largest metropolitan area in the sub-region. This location is approximately 330 kilometres (210 mi), by road, north of the city of Kampala, Uganda's capital and largest metropolitan area.

== Overview ==
Nwoya District is one of the newest districts in Uganda. It was established by an Act of Parliament and began functioning on 1 July 2010. Prior to that date, it was part of Amuru District. The district is part of the Acholi sub-region.

== Population ==
In 1991, the district population was estimated at 37,900. In 2002, the population was recorded at 41,010. In 2012, the mid-year population was estimated at 54,000. In the 2024 National Housing and Population Census, the population was recorded at 220,593.

== Economic activity ==
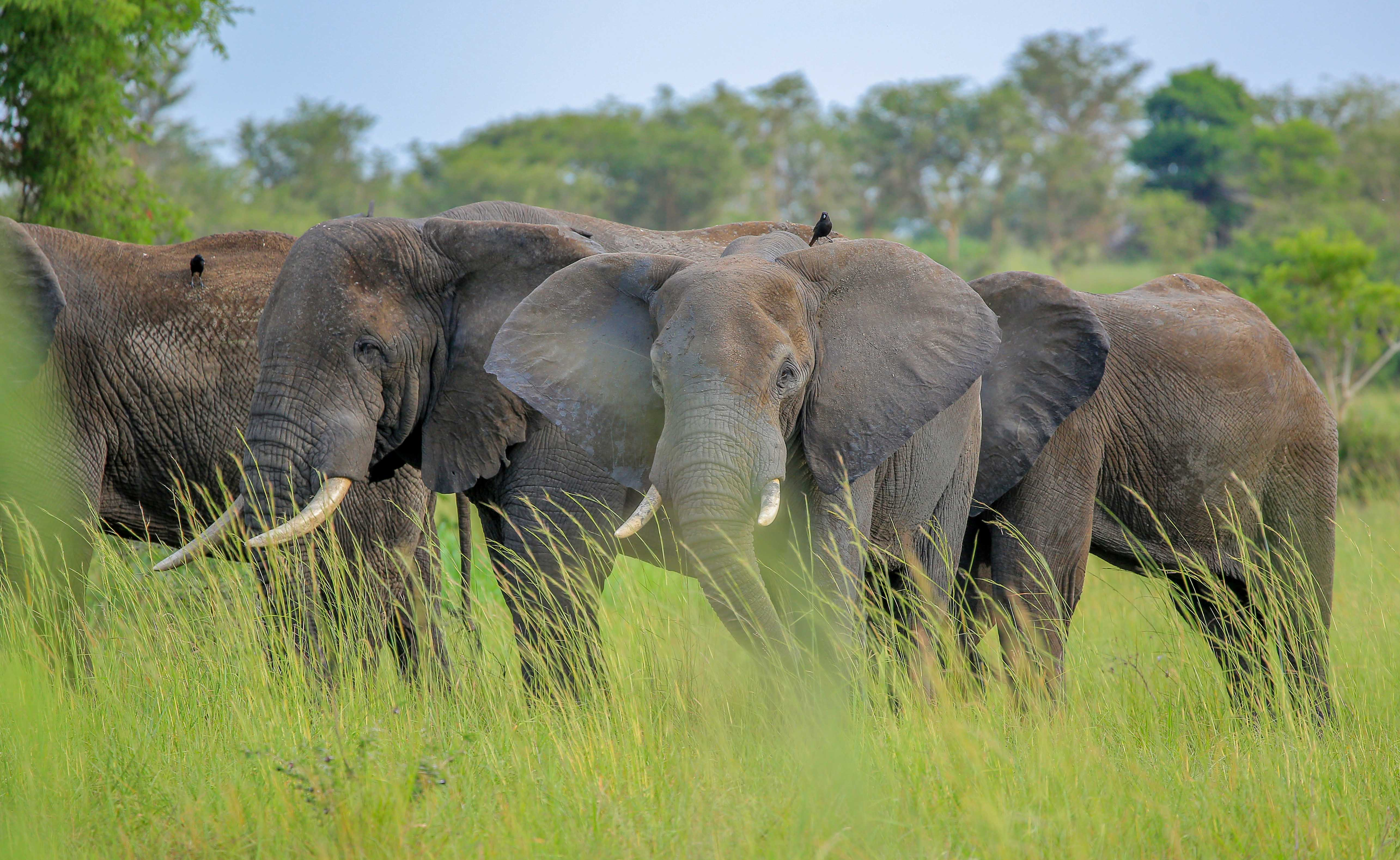
Elephants in Nwoya

Prior to 2013, subsistence agriculture and livestock husbandry were the main economic activity in the district. More recently, crude oil deposits have been found and commercial extraction is being planned.

== See also ==
- Nwoya
- Acholi sub-region
- Acholi people
- Northern Region, Uganda
- Districts of Uganda
