= Karuma =

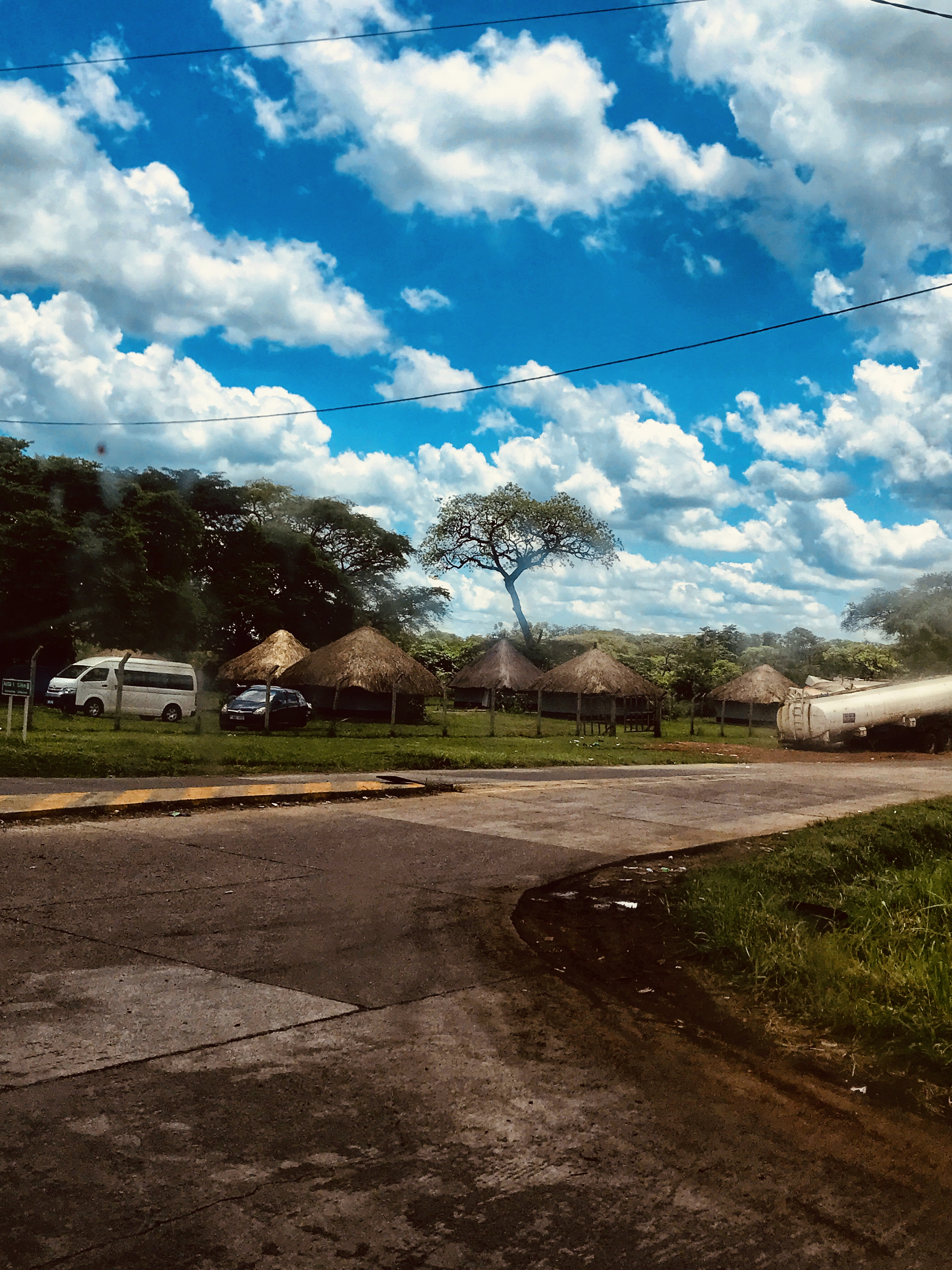

- Location in Uganda
- Coordinates: 02°15′16″N 32°14′37″E
- Country: Uganda
- Region: Western Uganda
- Sub-region: Bunyoro sub-region
- District: Kiryandongo District
- Elevation: 3,468 ft (1,057 m)

Karuma is a settlement in the Western Region of Uganda.

== Location ==
Karuma is in Kiryandongo District, Bunyoro sub-region. The town is approximately 2.7 kilometres (1.7 mi), by road, north of Karuma Falls. The town is also approximately 11 kilometres (6.8 mi), by road, west of Kamdini, on the Lira–Kamdini–Karuma Road. This location is approximately 261 kilometres (162 mi) north of Kampala, Uganda's capital and largest city., The coordinates of the town are 2°15'16.0"N, 32°14'37.0"E (Latitude:2.254445; Longitude:32.243611).

== Overview ==
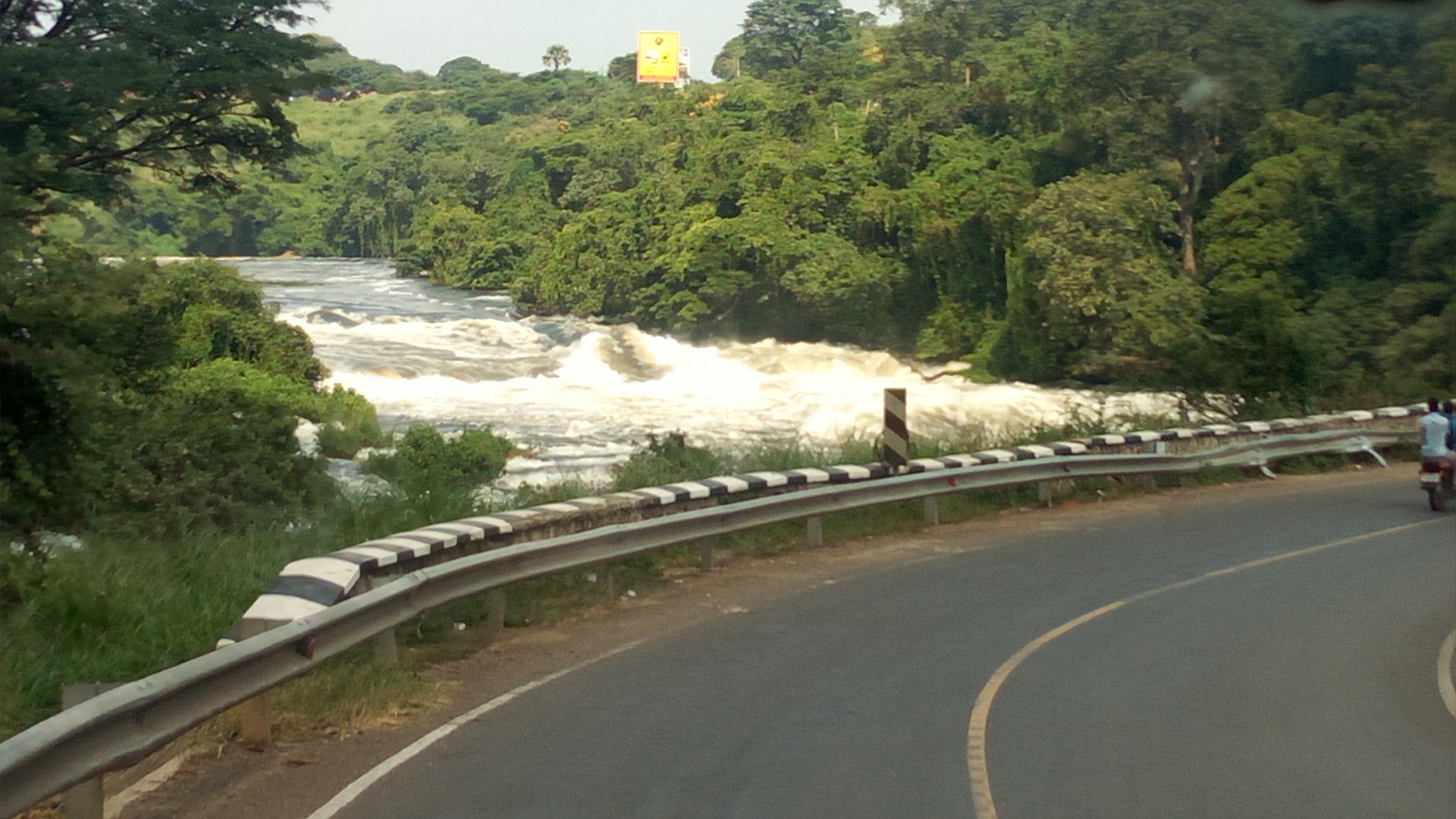
Karuma Bridge

Karuma is where the Lira–Kamdini–Karuma Road connects to the Kampala–Karuma Road and the Karuma–Olwiyo–Pakwach–Nebbi–Arua Road.

== See also ==
- Murchison Falls National Park
- List of cities and towns in Uganda
- List of roads in Uganda
