= Gulu =

City in northern Uganda

- City
- Location within Uganda
- Coordinates: 02°46′54″N 32°17′57″E
- Country: Uganda
- Region: Northern Region
- Sub-region: Acholi sub-region
- District: Gulu District
- Elevation: 1,100 m (3,600 ft)

Population (2024 Census)
  - Total: 233,271
- Postal code: 256
- Website: Official website

Gulu is a city in the Northern Region of Uganda and is the commercial and administrative centre of Gulu District.

The coordinates of the city of Gulu are 2°46'54.0"N 32°17'57.0"E. The city of Gulu is 333 kilometres (207 mi) from Kampala by road, making Gulu a common stopover or road travel midpoint between the Ugandan capital and South Sudan's capital, Juba, which lies 321 kilometres (199 mi) to the north-northwest. Gulu is served by Gulu Airport.

== History ==
During the British rule in the 19th and 20th centuries, Northern Uganda was less developed than the rest of the country. The people were conscripted into the army and the police, with many sent to fight in the First and Second World Wars.

In the 1960s, many Sudanese, Rwandan and Congolese refugees settled in the city.

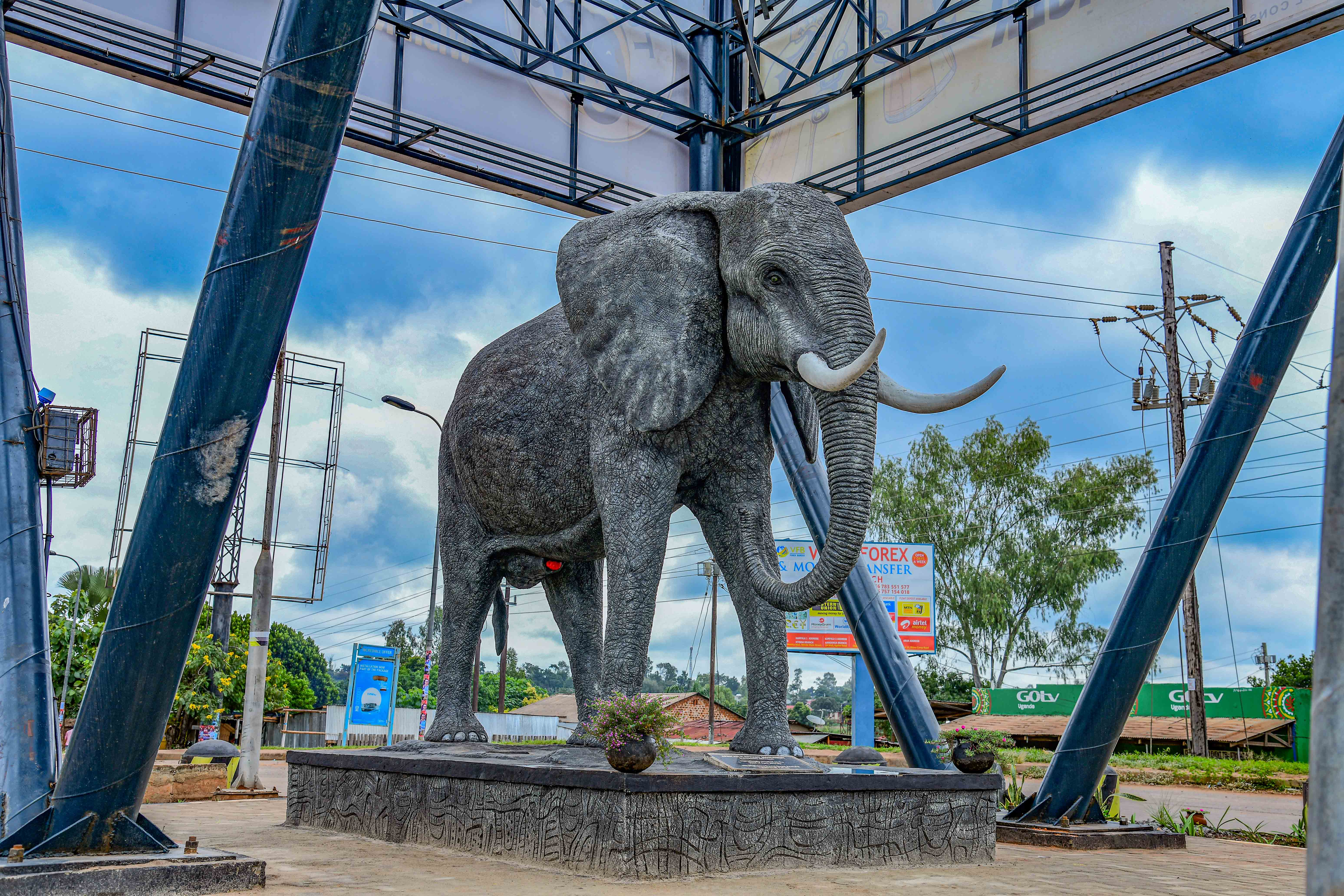
Giant elephant monument in Gulu

The Lord's Resistance Army (LRA), under the leadership of Joseph Kony, sprung up in the 1990s after Auma/Lakwena went to Kenya. The LRA became increasingly violent in Gulu and surrounding communities. Up to 15,000 children, known as "night commuters", would flee into the city for safety every evening. In 1996, the Ugandan government ordered all civilians in northern Uganda to relocate to internally displaced person (IDP) camps. Several organizations, such as Stop the Genocide in Northern Uganda, called the camps "concentration camps" and demanded their immediate closure. At one time, an estimated two million people lived in the camps.

In April 2009, all IDP camps were closed, and the people were allowed to return to their villages. By July 2009, an estimated 1,452,000 people (80.7 percent of those living in the camps) had voluntarily left the camps to return home. Since the spring of 2007, there has been relative peace in the region as the LRA became a much less significant threat.

== Climate ==
Gulu's climate is tropical wet and dry (Aw) according to the Köppen-Geiger climate classification system.

Climate data for Gulu (1961–1990)
Month	Jan	Feb	Mar	Apr	May	Jun	Jul	Aug	Sep	Oct	Nov	Dec	Year
Mean daily maximum °C (°F)	31.3 (88.3)	31.7 (89.1)	30.7 (87.3)	29.2 (84.6)	28.4 (83.1)	27.9 (82.2)	27.0 (80.6)	27.4 (81.3)	28.5 (83.3)	28.6 (83.5)	28.6 (83.5)	29.1 (84.4)	29.0 (84.3)
Mean daily minimum °C (°F)	16.5 (61.7)	17.5 (63.5)	18.0 (64.4)	17.9 (64.2)	17.8 (64.0)	17.3 (63.1)	16.9 (62.4)	16.9 (62.4)	16.9 (62.4)	17.1 (62.8)	16.8 (62.2)	16.3 (61.3)	17.2 (62.9)
Average rainfall mm (inches)	16.5 (0.65)	29.4 (1.16)	84.7 (3.33)	166.2 (6.54)	175.6 (6.91)	152.1 (5.99)	168.6 (6.64)	237.8 (9.36)	174.6 (6.87)	186.9 (7.36)	109.0 (4.29)	37.4 (1.47)	1,538.8 (60.57)
Average rainy days (≥ 1.0 mm)	2.5	4.2	8.4	13.9	14.8	12.2	13.5	16.1	14.5	16.3	11.4	3.8	131.6
Source: World Meteorological Organization

== Demographics ==
The national census in 2002 estimated Gulu's population at 119,430. The Uganda Bureau of Statistics (UBOS) estimated the population at 149,900 in 2010. In 2011, UBOS estimated the mid-year population at 154,300. The 2014 population census put the population at 152,276.

In 2020, the mid-year population of Gulu City was projected by city division as follows: Bar Dege (47,700), Laroo (32,300), Layibi (43,900) and Pece (53,500), for a total of 177,400.

Historical population
Year	Pop.	±%
2002	119,430	—
2010	149,900	+25.5%
2011	154,300	+2.9%
2014	152,276	−1.3%
2015	153,800	+1.0%
2020	177,400	+15.3%

== Education ==
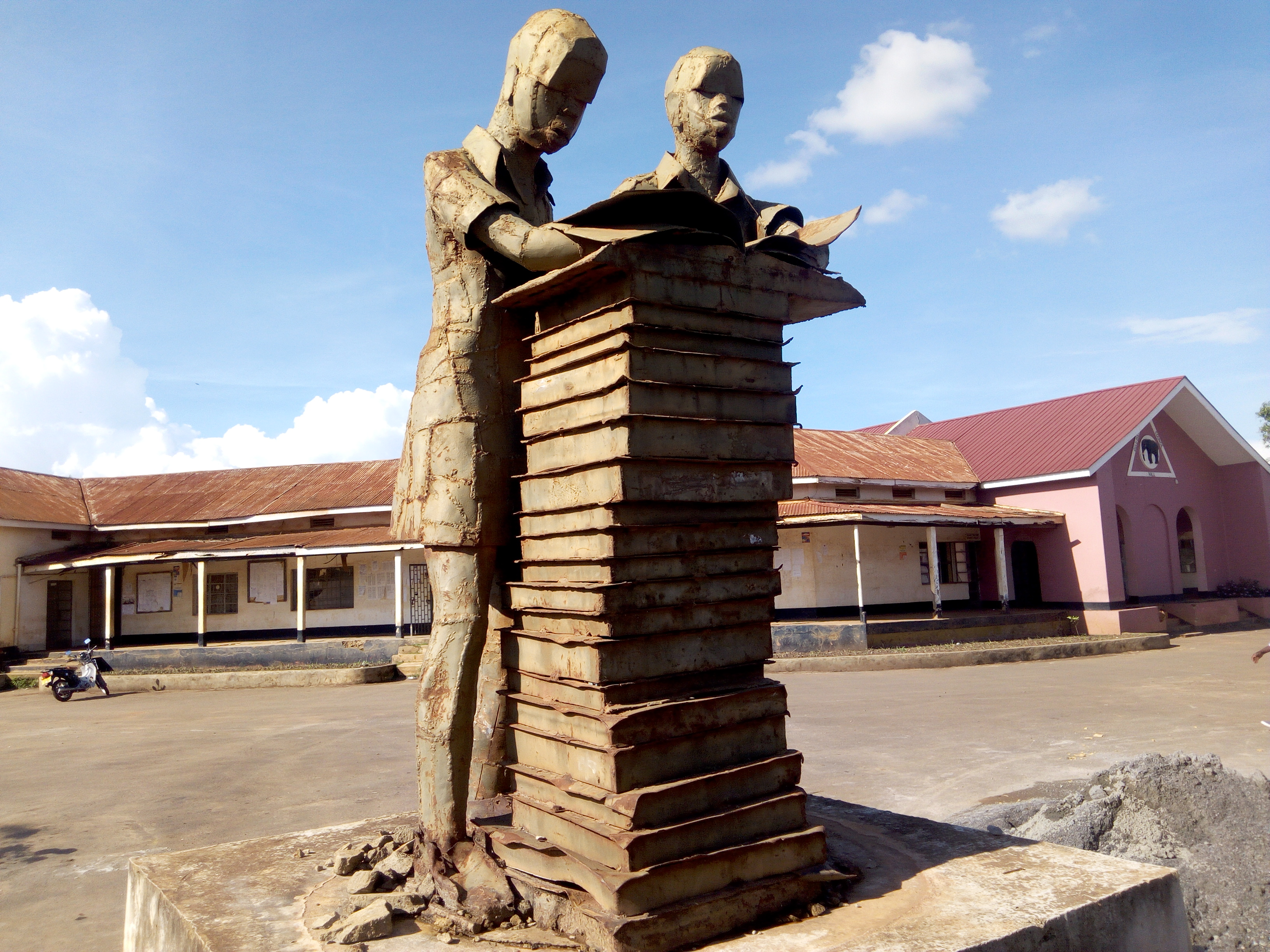
Metal peace monument established in 2009 by the Dutch Embassy at the Gulu District Local Government headquarters. It depicts two children reading a book on top of a pile of 20 other books. The monument was established in honor of the end of the 20 years war of the Lord's Resistance Army led by Joseph Kony.

Gulu is the home of Gulu University, which has a wide range of programs including agriculture, medicine, business management, and conflict resolution. It is one of the three public universities in the Northern Region, the others being Muni University in Arua and Lira University in Lira. Gulu University is the parent institution of the Gulu University School of Medicine, one of the nine accredited medical schools in Uganda as of February 2015. The Uganda Management Institute, a government-owned tertiary teaching and research institution in management and administration, has a campus in Gulu. Gulu also hosts University of the Sacred Heart Gulu, a private university affiliated with the Roman Catholic Archdiocese of Gulu.

== Health ==
There are three hospitals in the city: St. Mary's Hospital Lacor, the Gulu Regional Referral Hospital, and Gulu Independent Hospital.

There is also a center for non-medical integrative therapies, Thrive-Gulu, founded by Boston-based professor Judy Dushku and her husband Jim Coleman, and part-funded by Eliza Dushku. It has received funding support from Irish aid agency Trocaire and a Scandinavian foreign aid provider.

== Transport ==
=== Air ===
The city is served by Gulu Airport, which has a tarmac runway that measures 10,314 feet (3,144 m). Gulu Airport is the second biggest airport in Uganda after Entebbe International Airport.

=== Rail ===
Gulu has a station on the metre gauge railway that connects Tororo and Pakwach, which had been out of service since 1993. Rift Valley Railways funded the clearing of vegetation and the repair of infrastructure, thus allowing the first commercial train for 20 years to run through Gulu on 14 September 2013.

== Sport ==
The home venue for Gulu United FC is Pece War Memorial Stadium, which has a capacity of 3,000 people. The stadium was built by the British in 1959, with long-delayed renovations starting in April 2017.

== Places of worship ==
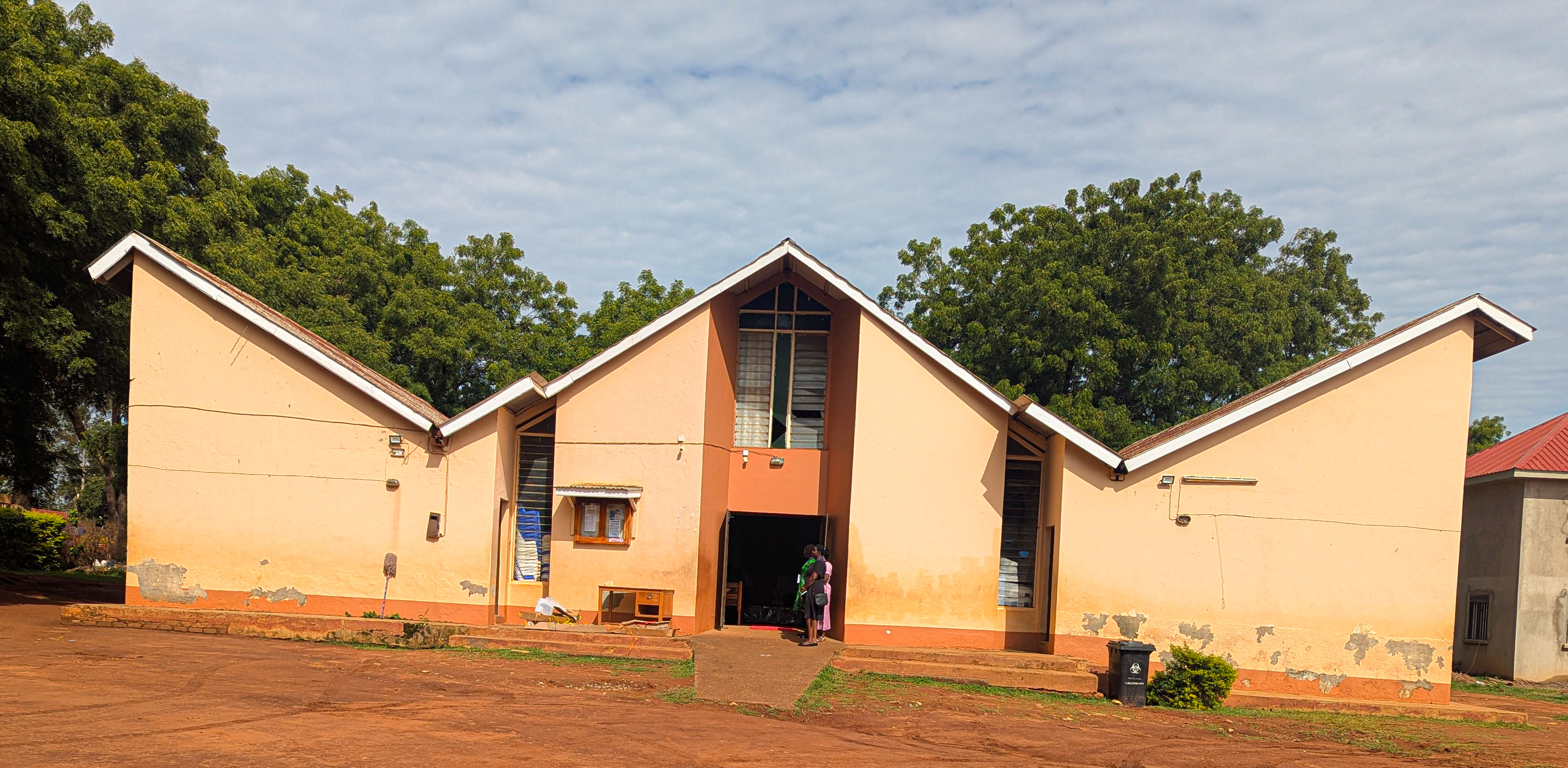
St Philip's cathedral (Church of Uganda)

Predominant among the places of worship are Christian facilities for communities including the: Roman Catholic Archdiocese of Gulu (Catholic Church), Eastern Orthodox Diocese of Gulu (Patriarchate of Alexandria), Church of Uganda (Anglican Communion), Presbyterian Church in Uganda (World Communion of Reformed Churches), Baptist Union of Uganda (Baptist World Alliance), Watoto Church, Assemblies of God, and the Church of Jesus Christ of Latter-day Saints. There are also Muslim mosques.

On October 11, 2026, the Hindu temple BAPS Swaminarayan Mandir was reopened, originally built in 1965 and abandoned in the 1970s.

== Water and sanitation ==
With loans obtained from the World Bank and KfW, the government of Uganda in 2020, completed Phase I of the Gulu Water Supply and Sanitation Project. The project required USh82.3 billion (US$22+ million) to be implemented. With the improvements, Gulu City has storage capacity of 42,000,000 cubic metres (1.1×10^{10} US gal) of potable water. In addition, at least 42 public toilets have been built, capable of accommodating 250 people simultaneously. A new sewage sludge treatment plant in Cubu has been constructed.

Phase II of the project involves establishment of a drinking water intake plant, upstream of Karuma Hydroelectric Power Station, with pumping capacity of 10,000 cubic metres (2,600,000 US gal) daily. This new potable water source will supply 341,000 people in Gulu and neighboring communities. It also includes the expansion of safe sanitation services to 170,000 new customers. KfW and the CDC Group are expected to fund the second stage, starting in June 2021.

== Notable people ==
- Okot p'Bitek, poet
- Taban Lo Liyong, poet and writer
- Otema Alimadi, former premier of Uganda
- Lumix Da Don, musical artist
- Judith Heard, fashion model
- Catherine Kyobutungi, born here in 1972
- Pen-Mogi Nyeko, veterinarian, academic and statesman; former vice chancellor of Gulu University, 2002–2018
- Professor George Openjuru Ladaah, academic and academic administrator, who serves as the Vice Chancellor of Gulu University, a public university in the Northern Region of Uganda, since 13 January 2018.
- Ronald Reagan Okumu, politician, philanthropist, researcher, lobbyist and peace activist; former Member of Parliament of Uganda Aswa County, Gulu District 1996–2021
- Betty Aol Ocan, politician, former leader of Opposition in the 10th Parliament of Uganda
- Norbert Mao, president of Democratic Party; former Member of Parliament, Gulu Municipality; former LC5 Gulu District; current Minister of Justice and Constitutional Affairs in the Museveni's NRM Government
- Ojara Martin Mapenduzi, Ugandan journalist, politician and member of the Parliament representing Gulu West (Bardege-Layibi Division)

== Languages spoken by people of Gulu district ==
- Luo-Acholi
- Lango
- Swahili
- English

== See also ==
- Railway stations in Uganda
- Acholi sub-region
- List of cities and towns in Uganda
