= Kiryandongo District =

- District
- District location in Uganda
- Coordinates: 02°00′N 32°18′E
- Country: Uganda
- Region: Western Uganda
- Sub-region: Bunyoro sub-region
- Capital: Kiryandongo

Area
  - Land: 3,624.1 km^{2} (1,399.3 sq mi)
- Elevation: 1,160 m (3,810 ft)

Population (2012 Estimate)
  - Total: 317,500
  - Density: 87.6/km^{2} (227/sq mi)
- Time zone: UTC+3 (EAT)
- Website: www.kiryandongo.go.ug

Kiryandongo District is a district in Western Uganda. Like many other Ugandan districts, it is named after its 'chief town', Kiryandongo, where the district headquarters are located.

== Location ==
Kiryandongo District is bordered by Nwoya District to the north, Oyam District to the northeast, Apac District to the east, and Masindi District to the south and west. Kiryandongo, the location of the district headquarters, lies approximately 225 kilometres (140 mi) northwest of Kampala, Uganda's capital and largest city. The coordinates of the district are:02 00N, 32 18E (Latitude:2.0000; Longitude:32.3000).

Kiryandongo District is made up of several Administrative units and these include Counties, Sub counties, Parishes and Villages.

=== Kibanda North County ===
There seven sub county and three Town Councils Form up Kibanda North County and these include.

==== Bweyale Town Council ====
- Central Ward
- Northern Ward
- Southern Ward

==== Diima ====
- Diima
- Okwece

==== Kiruma Town Council ====
- Central Ward
- Northern Ward
- Southern Ward

==== Kichwabugingo ====
- Chope Lwor
- Karungu
- Kichwabugingo
- Nyinga

==== Kiryandongo ====
- Kibeka
- Kikube
- Kitwara
- Kyembera

==== Kiryandongo Refugee Camp ====
- Ranch i
- Ranch xviii
- Ranch xxxvii

==== Kiryandongo Town Council ====
- Northern Ward
- Southern Ward

==== Kyankende ====
- Diika
- Kahara
- Kyankende

==== Mutunda ====
- Kakwokwo
- Kimogoro
- Panyadoli

==== Nyamahasa ====
- Alero
- Laboke
- Nanda
- Nyamahasa

=== Kibanda South County ===
Below are the sub county, Town council, and Parishes that form up the great Kibanda South County.

==== Kigumba ====
- Buhoomozi
- Kigumba
- Kiigya
- Mpumwe

==== Kigumba Town Council ====
- Ward A
- Ward B
- Ward C

==== Masindi Port ====
- Kaduku
- Kitukuza
- Waibango
- Wakisanyi

==== Mboira ====
- Apodorwa
- Kifuruta
- Mboira
- Nyakabale

== Overview ==
Kiryandongo District was established on 1 July 2010. It was previously part of Masindi District. The district is part of Bunyoro sub-region, which is coterminous with Bunyoro Kingdom. The districts that constitute Bunyoro sub-region include the following: 1. Buliisa District 2. Hoima District 3. Kibaale District 4. Kiryandongo District and 5. Masindi District. In 2002, the sub-region was home to an estimated 750,000 inhabitants, according to the national population and household census conducted that year.

== Population ==
The 1991 Uganda national census estimated the district population at 83,405. According to the 2002 national census, that population had increased to about 187,700. In 2012, the population of Kiryandongo District was estimated at 317,500. A new national census is planned for August 2014. in 2014 the population was estimated as 266,197, and in 2024 it was estimated as 364,872.

== Economic activity ==
- Maize
- Beans
- Bananas
- Coffee
- Livestock farming
- trade and commerce
- fishing

== Livestock kept by the population ==
- Cattle
- Goat
- Sheep
- Pigs
- Poultry

== See also ==
- Kiryandongo
- Karuma Power Station
- Bunyoro sub-region
- Western Region, Uganda
- Districts of Uganda
- Parliament of Uganda
