= Catherine Amusugut =

Ugandan geologist and corporate executive

- Born: 1983 (age 42–43); Uganda
- Citizenship: Uganda
- Education: Makerere University (Bachelor of Science in Geology and Chemistry); University of Aberdeen (Master of Science in Petroleum Geoscience)
- Occupation: Geologist
- Years active: 2007–present
- Known for: Technical competence
- Title: Geoscience Manager at Uganda National Oil Company (UNOC)

Catherine Amusugut is a Ugandan geologist and corporate executive, who serves as a Geoscience Manager at the Uganda National Oil Company (UNOC), since August 2017. Before that, from January 2007 until August 2017, she served as a Geologist at the Petroleum Exploration and Production Department (PEPD), in the Uganda Ministry of Energy and Mineral Development.

== Background and education ==
She was educated at Makerere University, Uganda's largest and oldest public university, where she graduated with a Bachelor of Science in Geology and Chemistry. Later, in 2010, she obtained a Master of Science in Petroleum Geoscience, from the University of Aberdeen, in Scotland.

== Career ==
Amusugut joined the PEPD in January 2007, beginning as Geologist-trainee, while she was still an undergraduate at Makerere University. Following her graduation with a BSc degree in geology, she was hired full-time as a geologist. Her responsibilities included reviewing the work plans submitted by the oil companies to make sure the plans are efficient and geologically, environmentally and commercially "viable". If all the criteria are met, permission to proceed with drilling is granted. In this capacity, she interacted with corporate executives of international oil companies, on the best plan of action.

In 2017, she was hired as Geoscience Manager at Uganda National Oil Company (UNOC).

== Scientific writings ==
Amusugut has written several scientific papers in her area of expertise, which have been presented at international conferences and/or published in peer journals.

== See also ==
- Pauline Irene Batebe
- Proscovia Nabbanja
- Josephine Wapakabulo
- Economy of Uganda
