= Tanga Oil Refinery =

Planned crude oil refinery in Tanzania

- Location within Tanzania
- Location: Tanga, Tanga Region, Tanzania; 05°30′03″S 39°04′41″E

Refinery details
- Owners: 1. Tanzania Petroleum Development Corporation; 2. Uganda National Oil Company; 3. Vitol Bahrain EC
- Opened: 2036 (Expected)
- Capacity: 200,000 barrels per day (32,000 m^{3}/d)

The Tanga Oil Refinery is a planned crude oil refinery in the city of Tanga on the Indian Ocean shores of mainland Tanzania. The refinery is planned to be fed by the East African Crude Oil Pipeline (EACOP) that stretches from the oil fields in the Western Region of Uganda to the Port of Tanga in Tanzania. The refinery is part of a broader project that intends to develop Tanga into "a regional energy hub".

== Location ==
The refinery would be located at Tanga along the shores of the Indian Ocean on the coast of mainland Tanzania. Tanga is located approximately 338 kilometres (210 mi) north of Dar es Salaam, the largest city in the country.

== Overview ==
The two neighboring countries of Tanzania and Uganda plan to jointly develop the Tanzanian port city of Tanga into a regional energy hub. They have enlisted the participation of Vitol Bahrain EC in the plan. "The proposed hub is expected to support petroleum storage, blending, logistics, marine services and fuel trading". The proposed infrastructure developments include, but are not limited to:

- The eastern end of the East African Crude Oil Pipeline (EACOP) at the Port of Tanga
- The Tanga Oil Refinery
- The proposed Tanga-Namwabula Oil Products pipeline, carrying the refined products from this refinery back to Uganda.
- Storage facilities for crude oil and petroleum refined products.
- The Tanzania-Uganda Natural Gas Pipeline
- Other related infrastructure.

== History ==
In August 2026 the Tanzania Petroleum Development Corporation (TPDC), the Uganda National Oil Company (UNOC) and the Vitol Baharain EC (VBEC) signed a memorandum of understanding (MOU) to begin feasibility studies for this oil refinery and related infracture that is not yet in place. The price of construction is estimated at US$20 billion.

== Ownership ==
As of August 2026, the tentative ownership table was as follows:

Tanga Oil Refinery Stock Ownership (Tentative)
Rank	Name of Owner	Percentage Ownership
1	Vitol Bahrain EC	
2	Tanzania Petroleum Development Corporation	
3	Uganda National Oil Company	
4	Other Investors	
	Total	100.00

== See also ==
- Uganda Oil Refinery
- Lamu Oil Refinery
- East African Crude Oil Pipeline
- Tanzania–Uganda Natural Gas Pipeline
