= Kampala Fuel Storage Facility =

Fuel storage depot in Uganda

- Location within Uganda
- Abbreviation: KFSF
- Formation: 17 September 2026
- Type: Parastatal
- Headquarters: Namwabula, Mpigi District, Buganda Region, Uganda
- Coordinates: 00°18′38″N 32°24′38″E
- Region served: East Africa
- Parent organization: Uganda National Oil Company
- Budget: Construction (US$310 million)

The Kampala Fuel Storage Facility (KFSF) is an oil depot under construction in Uganda. It is intended to improve and "strengthen fuel security" in Uganda and "build infrastructure around its emerging oil industry". The facility will be the convergence of three pipelines, namely (a) the Hoima–Kampala Petroleum Products Pipeline (b) the Eldoret–Kampala Petroleum Products Pipeline and the (c) Kampala–Kigali Petroleum Products Pipeline. When construction is completed, the 320,000,000 liters (70,390,159 imp gal; 84,535,057 U.S. gal) facility will be the largest tank farm in Uganda.

== Location ==
KFSF sits on an estate that measures 300 acres (121 ha) in Namwabula Village, Mpigi District, Central Region, Uganda. Namwabula lies approximately 30 kilometres (19 mi), west of Kampala, Uganda's capital city off of the Kampala–Mityana Road. Namwabula lies approximatekly 8 kilometres (5 mi) southwest of the suburb of Buloba in Wakiso District. Namwabula Village is located approximately 1,218 metres (3,996 ft) above mean sea level.

== Overview ==
When the Uganda Oil Refinery is constructed, a 211 kilometres (131 mi) refined petroleum products pipeline, the Hoima–Kampala Petroleum Products Pipeline, will connect the refinery of KFSF. The pipeline is expected to transport at least four products to Namwabula (1) gasoline, (2) diesel fuel, (3) jet fuel and (4) kerosene. The products will be distributed by truck from KFSF to airports, petrol stations and other oil depots in the Kampala Metropolitan Area and in the districts of the Central Region of Uganda.

The facility will also incorporate the "planned Mpigi Remote Refinery Terminal (MRRT)". Once the refinery, pipeline, MRRT and storage terminal are operational, the country "expects to have an integrated system for receiving, storing and distributing both imported and domestically refined petroleum products". If and when the Tanga-Kampala Refined Petroleum Products Pipeline is built, its eastern end will be located at the KFSF.

== Ownership ==
KFSF is owned 100 percent by the Uganda National Oil Company (UNOC).

== Construction ==
As of September 2026, the Engineering, procurement, and construction (EPC) contractor has not been announced publicly. Construction started on 18 September 2026 and is expected to last approximately 3 years. The budgetted construction cost is US$310 million.

== See also ==
- East African Crude Oil Pipeline
- Uganda National Pipeline Company
