= End Fossil Occupy Uganda =

Grassroots youth movement of climate campaigners

End Fossil Occupy Uganda is a Ugandan youth climate organisation founded in 2023 and affiliated with the international End Fossil: Occupy! student climate campaign. The organisation is based in Kampala and is listed as a project of the Kutas Green Foundation. It states its aims as a phase-out of fossil fuels and a just transition for Africa, with a focus on opposing the East African Crude Oil Pipeline (EACOP) and pressuring financial institutions to withdraw support from fossil fuel projects.

== History ==
End Fossil Occupy Uganda was founded by climate activist Nicholas Omonuk a climate justice activist from Pallisa in eastern Uganda, in 2023. Omonuk grew up in a pastoralist family whose livelihood was disrupted by droughts that dried up wells, caused malnutrition among livestock, and forced many households to sell animals and migrate to towns including Kampala and Jinja, or to neighbouring countries. After attending a university climate workshop in 2021, Omonuk began participating in local climate strikes and digital activism. He founded End Fossil Occupy Uganda two years later. He has described his personal experience of climate impacts as central to his campaigning: "Whenever I speak about my story, it hurts me emotionally and sometimes I want to cry. But I know that if I don't let the world know about it, they will not act on such climate injustices.

== Activities ==
=== Insurance divestment campaign ===
In February 2024, End Fossil Occupy Uganda participated in protests in Kampala as part of the first Insure Our Future Global Week of Action, during which approximately 60 actions took place across 27 countries.The protests called on insurance companies to stop underwriting fossil fuel projects. Omonuk stated: "Without insurance, fossil fuel projects cannot be built or operated. Insurance companies have the power to expedite the shift to renewable energy and support a just and equitable transition.

In a statement issued ahead of the protests, End Fossil Occupy Uganda described insurance companies as "increasing the wound of climate injustice by insuring fossil fuels production rather than a just transition," and called on them to "choose people and the planet over fossil fuel companies.

During the same campaign period, Probitas, an insurance company with reported involvement in EACOP, announced it would not insure the project or the West Cumbria coal mine, following a blockade by Extinction Rebellion at Lloyd's of London.

In late 2023, Human Rights Watch wrote to 15 insurance and reinsurance companies, sharing its findings on the environmental and human rights risks of EACOP and calling on them to withdraw support for the project. Two companies, Lloyd's of London and Chubb, responded. Neither agreed to reassess their involvement.

=== Opposition to the East African Crude Oil Pipeline (EACOP) ===
End Fossil Occupy Uganda opposes the East African Crude Oil Pipeline (EACOP), a $4.8 billion pipeline spanning 1,443 kilometres, described as the longest heated crude oil pipeline in the world. The pipeline is designed to transport crude oil from Uganda's Tilenga and Kingfisher oil fields in the Albertine region to the Tanzanian port of Tanga on the Indian Ocean. It is owned by a consortium comprising TotalEnergies (62%), the Uganda National Oil Company (15%), Tanzania Petroleum Development Corporation (15%), and CNOOC (8%).

In July 2025, End Fossil Occupy Uganda issued a statement asserting that the pipeline had affected over 100,000 people across Uganda and Tanzania, threatened biodiversity including ecosystems around Murchison Falls National Park and Lake Albert, and would generate more than 34 million tonnes of CO2 annually according to the group. Trade publications covering related London protests cited separate estimates that the pipeline would produce 379 million tonnes of CO2 equivalent over its full operational lifetime. Group spokesperson Felix Musinguzi said: "EACOP has already devastated thousands of families who have lost their land with unfair compensation. With oil fields already in the middle of ecosystems and biodiversity like Murchison Falls National Park and the shores of Lake Albert, this project represents an unacceptable threat to Uganda's people, wildlife, and future.

Human Rights Watch has separately documented harms to communities in Uganda arising from the pipeline's land acquisition process. Research conducted by the organisation found that many affected farming households received no compensation for years after their land was evaluated for acquisition, leaving them unable to tend their crops during that period. When payments were eventually made, those interviewed by Human Rights Watch described them as falling short of what would be needed to buy equivalent replacement land. The resulting financial pressure led families to sell livestock and take on debt to cover basic living costs, a situation Human Rights Watch associated with household food insecurity and children leaving school.

The July 2025 statement by End Fossil Occupy Uganda followed announcements by Standard Bank, Stanbic Bank Uganda, KCB Bank Uganda, and Saudi Arabia's Islamic Development Corporation that they were financing the project. The group called on those institutions to withdraw their support and urged the Ugandan government to redirect investment toward renewable energy.

In August 2025, End Fossil Occupy Uganda activists held protests in Kampala, with demonstrators carrying signs including "Every loan to big oil is a debt to our children" and "It's not economic development; it is corporate greed. Following a demonstration at Stanbic Bank headquarters, 12 activists including students were remanded to Luzira prison.

== Government response and human rights context ==
The Ugandan government has described the EACOP project as a national development priority. Uganda's Energy Minister Ruth Nankabirwa has characterised it as "strategic," and in July 2025, Hadi Watfa, project manager for Uganda's section of the pipeline, stated that construction had reached 62 percent completion, with first oil expected by the end of 2026. The government has dismissed anti-EACOP protests as orchestrated by "foreign saboteurs" seeking to undermine national development.

Human Rights Watch documented in its November 2023 report "Working On Oil is Forbidden" that environmental defenders in Uganda opposing oil development faced harassment, arbitrary arrests, office raids, and intimidation. Since October 2021, the report recorded at least 30 arrests of individuals protesting or raising concerns about oil projects. Civil society organisations operating near Uganda's oilfields in Buliisa, Kikuube, and Hoima faced sustained pressure from government and security officials.

The report described police raids on the offices of the Africa Institute for Energy Governance (AFIEGO) in Hoima, Buliisa, and Kampala in October 2021, during which computers were seized and staff arrested. Security officials were quoted telling activists to "stop working on oil" and characterising them as "anti-government" and "anti-development." One arrested student described to Human Rights Watch being questioned about protest funding at an undisclosed location and regaining consciousness in hospital two days later with injuries.

Human Rights Watch wrote in April 2024 that this situation had created "a chilling effect that stifles free expression related to concerns about one of the most controversial fossil fuel projects in the world," and called on the Ugandan government to end arrests and threats against environmental defenders and protesters.

Human Rights Watch also called on insurance companies to refuse support for EACOP, citing land acquisition harms, forced displacement, food insecurity, and environmental risks.

== See also ==
- East African Crude Oil Pipeline
- Extinction Rebellion
- Nicholas Omonuk
