= Petroleum Geology & Experiment =

Petroleum Geology and Experiment
- Discipline: Geology, Earth and planetary sciences
- Language: Chinese
- Edited by: Guo Xusheng

Publication details
- Former names: Experimental Petroleum Geology; Petroleum Geology Experiment Abstract; Petroleum Geology & Experiment
- History: 1963–present
- Frequency: Bimonthly
- Open access: Yes
- License: CC-BY-NC-ND

Standard abbreviations
- ISO 4: Pet. Geol. Exp.

Indexing
- CODEN: SSDIET
- ISSN: 1001-6112 (print); 2363-7625 (web)
- LCCN: 91644671
- OCLC no.: 24032027

Links
- Journal homepage; Online access; Online archive

Petroleum Geology & Experiment (Chinese: 石油实验地质) is a bimonthly peer-reviewed open access scientific journal covering the survey, exploration, engineering, and production of petroleum resources. It was established in 1963 and is sponsored by the China Petrochemical Corporation Petroleum Exploration and Production Research Institute and the Petroleum Geology Professional Committee of the Geological Society of China. The editor-in-chief is Guo Xusheng (Chinese Academy of Engineering).

== History ==
The journal was established in 1963 as Petroleum Geology Experiment Abstract (Chinese: 石油地质实验文摘) and renamed Experimental Petroleum Geology (Chinese: 石油地质实验) in 1965. In 1966, the journal ceased publication after three issues, but resumed publishing in 1978. In 1979, it obtained its current name, moving to a bimonthly frequency in 2002.

== Scientific conferences ==
The journal has sponsored and organized several scientific conferences and seminars in the past few years concerning oil and gas exploration in China.

== Abstracting and indexing ==
The journal is abstracted and indexed in EBSCO, Petroleum Abstracts (PA), GeoRef, Directory of Open Access Journals (DOAJ),Chemical Abstracts Service, GEOBASE, and Scopus.

== Notable articles ==
According to Scopus, the following three articles have been cited most:

- Suotang, Fu; Jingli, Yao; Shixiang, Li; Xinping, Zhou; Mingrui, Li (28 September 2020). "Enrichment characteristics and resource potential of continental shale oil in Mesozoic Yanchang Formation, Ordos Basin". Petroleum Geology & Experiment. 42 (5). Editorial office of Petroleum Geology and Experiment: 698–710. doi:10.11781/sysydz202005698. ISSN 1001-6112 – via Scopus.
- Suyun, Hu; Jianzhong, Li; Tongshan, Wang; Zecheng, Wang; Tao, Yang; Xin, Li; Lianhua, Hou; Xuanjun, Yuan; Rukai, Zhu; Bin, Bai; Qingong, Zhuo (28 September 2020). "CNPC oil and gas resource potential and exploration target selection". Petroleum Geology & Experiment. 42 (5). Editorial office of Petroleum Geology and Experiment: 813–823. doi:10.11781/sysydz202005813. ISSN 1001-6112 – via Scopus.
- Tonglou, Guo; Shu, Jiang; Peixian, Zhang; Ping, Zeng (28 September 2020). "Progress and direction of exploration and development of normally-pressured shale gas from the periphery of Sichuan Basin". Petroleum Geology & Experiment. 42 (5). Editorial office of Petroleum Geology and Experiment: 837–845. doi:10.11781/sysydz202005837. ISSN 1001-6112 – via Scopus.

== See also ==
- Journal of Petroleum Geology
- Marine and Petroleum Geology
- Natural Gas Industry
- Petroleum Geoscience
