= Fred Kabanda =

Ugandan geologist, engineer and business executive (born 1970

- Born: 1970 (age 55–56); Uganda
- Citizenship: Uganda
- Education: Makerere University; Bachelor of Science in Geology and Chemistry; Norwegian University of Science and Technology; Master of Science in Petroleum Engineering
- Occupations: Geologist, Petroleum Engineer and business executive
- Years active: 1990 — present
- Known for: Oil matters
- Title: Executive director Petroleum Authority of Uganda (beginning 1 December 2026)

Fred Kabanda is a Ugandan geologist, petroleum engineer and business executive. He was appointed as the executive director of the Petroleum Authority of Uganda in September 2026. He is expected to take up this position on 1 December 2026, after "the completion of the recruitment and onboarding process". Before that he served as Head of the Extractives Division at the African Development Bank.

== Background and education ==
He was born in Uganda circa 1970. He studied at Makerere University, the county's oldest and largest public university, where he graduated with a Bachelor of Science degree in Geology and Chemistry in 1993. His degree of Master of Science in Petroleum engineering was awarded by the Norwegian University of Science and Technology.

== Career ==
As of 2026, his career in "petroleum regulation, policy development and extractives governance", extended over a more than thirty year timeline. During that period, he worked in the Ugandan Ministry of Energy and Mineral Development, rising to the rank of "Assistant Commissioner and Head of the Regulatory Unit in the Petroleum Exploration and Production Department". He was one of the technocrats who formulated the Uganda National Oil and Gas Policy of 2008.

In June 2016, when the position of executive director at PAU was advertised, Fred Kabanda applied but the board selected Ernest Rubondo. In 2026, following the expiry of Rubondo's two consecutive terms at the helm, the board appointed Fred Kabanda to succeed him.

He was then employed by the African Development Bank where he has been responsible for policy support and strategy formulation on "extractives development across the continent". He is reported to assume the helm at PAU when the organizational focus shifts to supervision of "production, transportation and commercialisation of Uganda's crude oil".

== See also ==
- Uganda Oil Refinery
- Uganda National Oil Company
