= Tanzania–Uganda Natural Gas Pipeline =

Proposed natural gas pipeline

Location
- Country: Tanzania and Uganda
- Coordinates: 01°00′14″S 31°25′48″E
- Direction: Southeast to Northwest
- Start: Dar es Salaam, Tanzania
- Passes through: Tanga; Mwanza; Biharamulo; Mtukula; Masaka
- To: Kampala, Uganda

General information
- Status: Planned
- Owner: Tanzania Petroleum Development Corporation & Uganda National Pipeline Company
- Expected: 2028 Estimate

Technical information
- Length: 1,716 km (1,066 mi)

The Tanzania–Uganda Natural Gas Pipeline is a proposed natural gas pipeline, carrying natural gas from Tanzania to Uganda.

== Location ==
The pipeline would start in Dar es Salaam, Tanzania's financial capital and largest city. It would travel north to Port Tanga. From Port Tanga, the pipeline would travel westwards to the lakeside city of Mwanza. From Mwanza, the pipeline would loop around Lake Victoria to the border town of Mtukula, where it would cross into Uganda, continuing through Masaka, before ending in Kampala, Uganda's capital and largest city, a total distance of approximately 1,716 kilometres (1,066 mi).

== Overview ==
As far back as May 2016, the government of Tanzania expressed their intention to build a natural gas pipeline to Uganda, to evacuate liquid natural gas for sale to their northern neighbor.

Tanzania has proven natural gas reserves of 57 trillion cubic feet, with at least 49.5 trillion cubic feet of those reserves offshore in the Indian Ocean.

In August 2018, the Tanzania Petroleum Development Corporation (TPDC), began to actively search for an expert to carry out a feasibility study to determine the most economic route for this pipeline and to determine the potential and size of the regional market for Tanzania's natural gas.

The two countries agreed in 2016, to jointly develop the 1,450 kilometres (900 mi) East African Crude Oil Pipeline to bring land-locked Uganda's crude oil to the Tanzanian coast for export. In August 2018, the Uganda Minister of Energy, Irene Muloni, stated that the country was in direct talks with the Tanzanian government, regarding the importation of natural gas for use in Uganda's fledgling steel industry. Later that month, the two countries signed a definitive agreement to construct this gas pipeline.

== Developments ==
In November 2023, the two governments signed agreements to start the selection of a project consultant and commence feasibility studies. A joint implementation committee was established to lead the way forward. The two governments plan to fund the pre-construction feasibly and related studies on a 50/50 basis. Uganda plans to use the gas in industry; particularly in the steel industry, electricity generation, domestic use; replacing wood and charcoal and transportation; replacing gasoline and diesel. As at April 2024, those high level discussions were ongoing.

== See also ==
- Uganda–Tanzania Crude Oil Pipeline
- Tanzania Liquefied Natural Gas Project
- Mtwara–Dar es Salaam Natural Gas Pipeline
