= Pauline Irene Batebe =

Ugandan chemical and mechanical engineer

- Born: c. 1982 (age 43–44); Uganda
- Education: University of Dar es Salaam (Bachelor of Science in Chemical and Process Engineering); KTH Royal Institute of Technology (Master of Science in Mechanical Engineering); University of Manchester (Master of Science in Advanced Chemical Process Design)
- Occupations: Chemical Engineer and Non-Executive Chairwoman
- Years active: 2009 to present
- Known for: Technical competence
- Title: Chairperson of Uganda Refinery Holding Company & Chemical Engineer in the Uganda Ministry of Energy and Mineral Development

Pauline Irene Batebe also Irene Pauline Batebe or Irene Batebe, is a Ugandan chemical and mechanical engineer, who serves as the Permanent Secretary in the Uganda Ministry of Energy and Mineral Development, since August 2021.

Before that, she was the chairperson of the Uganda Refinery Holding Company (URHC), a subsidiary company of the Uganda National Oil Company (UNOC). When the Uganda Oil Refinery is built, URHC will own the shareholding that the government of Uganda will acquire in the joint venture.

Irene Batebe, a board member of the UNOC, also served as the Principal Refining Engineer in the Uganda Ministry of Energy and Mineral Development, since February 2009. She is responsible for ensuring that the machinery and equipment imported into the country to build the Uganda Oil Refinery and Uganda–Tanzania Crude Oil Pipeline meet standards and specifications. Batebe is one of the most senior engineers in the Energy ministry. She often accompanies the president of Uganda and or the Minister of Energy on international trips concerning the proposed oil refinery and crude oil pipeline. She is the government technocrat whose primary responsibility is building the oil refinery, the crude oil pipelines and petroleum products pipeline.

== Background and education ==
She was born in Uganda circa 1982. She attended Ugandan schools for her pre-university education. In 2001, she was admitted to the University of Dar es Salaam, graduating in 2005 with a Bachelor of Science degree in chemical and processing engineering. In 2007 she was admitted to the KTH Royal Institute of Technology, in Stockholm, Sweden, graduating in 2010 with a Master of Science degree in mechanical engineering, with focus on sustainable energy engineering. She then entered the University of Manchester in the United Kingdom, where in 2011, she was awarded the Master of Science degree in advanced chemical process design, with a focus on refinery design and operation.

== Career ==
Batebe was hired in February 2009 as the chief refining engineer at the Uganda Ministry of Energy and Minerals. Her responsibilities at the ministry included the certification that all the equipment and machinery imported into Uganda to construct the refinery and the East African Crude Oil Pipeline meet international standards and is of the right quality and specification. She has also presented papers at various oil and gas summits in Uganda and abroad including the SPE/AAPG Africa Energy and Technology Conference that was held in Nairobi Kenya in 2016.

== Family ==
Irene Batebe was married to the late Stephen Okello.

== Other considerations ==
In August 2015, when the National Oil Company of Uganda was established, Pauline Irene Batebe was named to its seven-person board of directors, where she still serves as of November 2017. She is also one of a handful of Ugandan women involved in the country's nascent extractives industry. In January 2017, she was appointed Chairperson of the board of directors of the Uganda Refinery Holding Company Limited, the holding company of the proposed oil refinery in Kabaale, Buseruka sub-county, in Hoima District. This holding company is a 100 percent subsidiary of the state-owned Uganda National Oil Company.

== See also ==
- Catherine Amusugut
- Proscovia Nabbanja
- Josephine Wapakabulo
- Uganda Oil Refinery
