= Nicholas Omonuk =

Ugandan climate justice activist

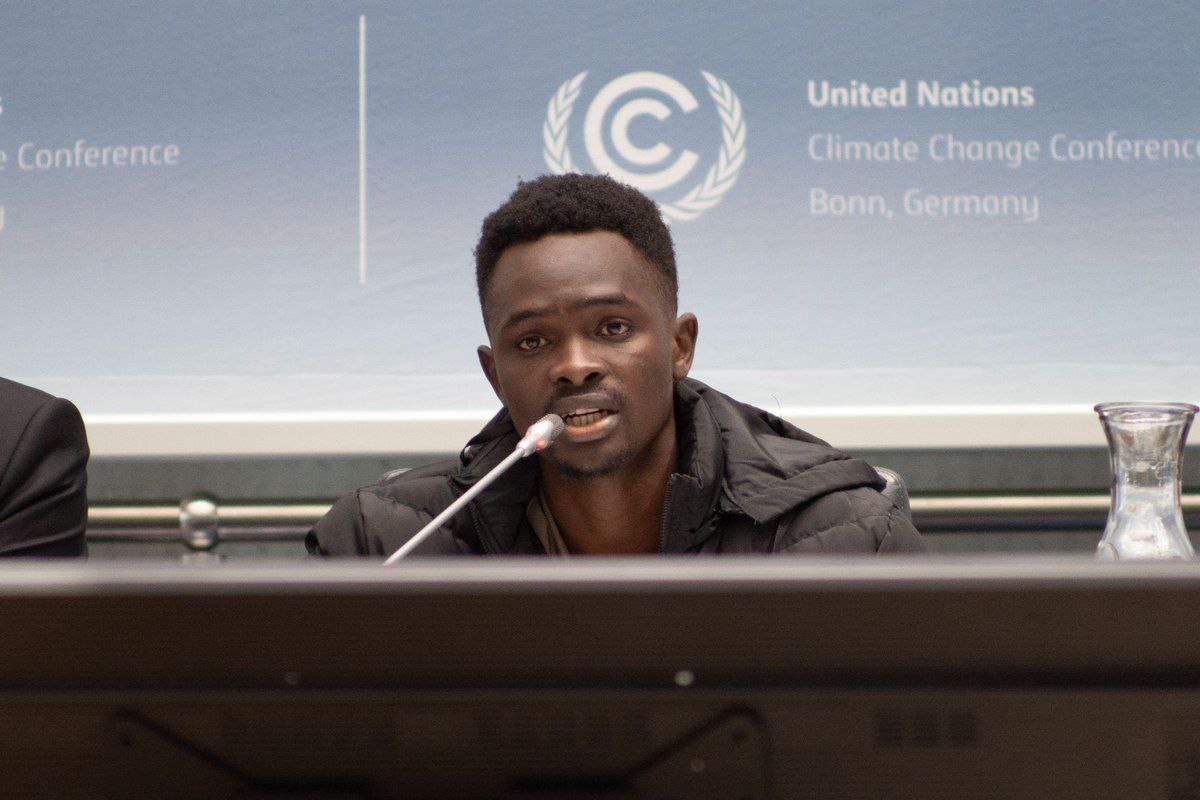
- Omonuk speaks at a UN Conference in Bonn, Germany
- Born: 1999 (age 26–27); Pallisa, Eastern Uganda
- Education: Bachelor's degree in Land Economics, Land and Property Evaluation (Surveying)
- Alma mater: Kyambogo University
- Occupation: Climate justice activist
- Organization: End Fossil Occupy Uganda

Nicholas Omonuk Okoit (born c. 1999) is a Ugandan climate justice activist and founder of End Fossil Occupy Uganda, a movement advocating for the phase out of fossil fuels and just transition (a process of transforming economies and societies towards sustainability while ensuring fairness and equity for all, particularly those most vulnerable to the changes) in Africa. Omonuk holds a degree in Land Economics from Kyambogo University, and has participated in international climate campaigns and conferences, including global climate events like the European Forum Alpbach in Austria, and UNFCCC annual climate conferences like the yearly United Nations Climate Change Conferences.

== Early life and education ==
Omonuk is from a pastoralist family in Pallisa, Eastern Uganda. He comes from the Iteso tribe, where each child has specific household responsibilities. According to sources, his activism was influenced by experiencing the effects of environmental challenges, such as drought, during his youth. Growing up in a rural community heavily reliant on farming and pastoralism, he experienced the direct impacts of climate change during his youth. In an interview published in Hermann (2024), he recalls that as a child, he and his brothers were responsible for looking after the family's livestock, initially traveling short distances to access water from a borehole. Over time, however, increasing drought conditions forced them to travel increasingly longer distances to find water and grazing land, eventually making it impossible to sustain their herd. According to Omonuk, the family was forced to sell off much of their livestock, with his father resorting to keeping chickens and selling eggs to fund his children's education.

Omonuk holds a bachelor's degree of science in Land Economics, Land and Property Evaluation (Surveying) from the Kyambogo University. Upon arriving at university, Omonuk observed that the majority of students did not come from rural communities, despite over 70% of Uganda's population living in rural and marginalized areas. According to sources, this observation, combined with his personal experience of climate-driven displacement of traditional livelihoods and culture, motivated his entry into climate activism.

== Activism ==
=== End Fossil Occupy Uganda and Agape Earth Coalition ===
Omonuk founded End Fossil Occupy Uganda, a local climate movement advocating for the phase out of fossil fuels and a just transition for Africa. He has been part of climate campaigns to urge governments and development partners to stop financing fossil fuel energy all over the globe in order to have a sustainable future for everyone. In February 2024, he launched a five-week campaign together with the End Fossil Occupy Uganda movement to amplify demands for climate justice.

During the European Forum Alpbach in Austria, he supported a climate strike, where he also tells through a podcast how climate change is forcing countless people from his homeland to sell their belongings and flee to other countries.

He supported a swimming climate action at the Dreirosenbrücke in Basel, Switzerland that aimed at demonstrating the connection between oil production and migration.

Omonuk represented the Most Affected People and Areas (MAPA) at COP27 and COP28, advocating for the phase-out of fossil fuels and operationalizing the Loss and Damage Fund.

In December 2023, he attended the COP28 Climate Conference in UAE. The United Nations Climate Change Conference or Conference of the Parties of the UNFCCC, more commonly referred to as COP, was the 28th United Nations Climate Change conference held annually for two weeks.

In 2024, he co-organized the Agape Earth Coalition, a unified organization with youth climate campaigners, NGOs, and grassroots movement groups as members. In late autumn 2024, Omonuk, alongside fellow Ugandan activists Evelyn Acham and Aidah Nakku, representing different movements and initiatives united under the Agape Earth Coalition, travelled through Europe to gather support for climate finance negotiations ahead of COP29. According to a published account, the group visited London, Strasbourg, and Berlin, with Bonn as their next destination, meeting with NGOs, politicians, academics, and young people in each country. On 29 and 30 November 2024, they visited Freie Universität Berlin as part of a lecture series on film and the ecological crisis, where they discussed climate justice activism, corporate accountability, and the realities of climate activism in the Global South. He was also invited to the COP29 in Azerbaijan.

=== Criticism of Fossil Fuels ===
Fossil fuel projects like Uganda's East African Crude Oil Pipeline (EACOP), are seen as a potential to drive economic growth and improve energy access, though they have sparked environmental concerns and have been opposed by environmental activists including Omonuk. Omonuk has criticized the involvement of corporations in controversial fossil fuels projects at local and international level. A major focus of Omonuk's activism is his campaign against the East African Crude Oil Pipeline (EACOP), which, at 1,443 kilometres, is to become the longest heated crude oil pipeline in the world, extending from the oil fields of Kingfisher and Tilenga in northern Uganda to the coast of the Indian Ocean in Tanzania.The pipeline is initiated by French oil and gas company TotalEnergies, with Chinese company CNOOC also involved in its construction. According to published sources, TotalEnergies holds a 62 percent stake, while CNOOC holds 8 percent and Uganda and Tanzania each hold 15 percent through their respective state companies. He opposed fossil fuel projects for their potential effects on local communities.

EU CSDDD

In October 2023, Omonuk alongside a human rights lawyer Maxwell Atuhura called on EU lawmakers to support the Corporate Sustainability Due Diligence Directive (CSDDD). He stated that the directive could establish mechanisms for accountability, enabling remedies for environmental and human rights abuses related to European Companies in Uganda, where legal recourse is limited.

However, the directive is opposed by some stakeholder groups and EU Member States who have a view that it would impose excessive regulatory burdens, increase compliance costs and potentially harm competitiveness, particularly for small and medium sized enterprises.

=== Publications and Authorship ===
Omonuk's advocacy extends to writing and contributing to academic and political discourse on corporate accountability and climate justice.

He is featured in the academic and cultural compilation Climatic Subjects: Cultural Interventions, Writing Climate, and a Burning Planet, co-authored with Evelyn Acham and Aidah Nakku. In a published interview conducted at Freie Universität Berlin on 29–30 November 2024, he discusses the intersections of climate justice, corporate accountability, Indigenous knowledge, and the realities of climate activism in the Global South, including the specific dangers faced by activists in Uganda.

He is also interviewed in the book What Do We Want? Der Klimastreik – von Systemwandel bis Klimagerechtigkeit (What Do We Want? The Climate Strike – From System Change to Climate Justice), published by Rotpunktverlag, Zürich, alongside fellow activist Patience Nabukalu. In the interview, conducted by author Cyrill Hermann, Omonuk discusses in detail his personal experiences growing up in Pallisa, the impacts of the EACOP project on local communities, the achievements of the Stop EACOP campaign, the structural inequalities underlying fossil fuel projects in Africa, and his vision for a genuinely just transition.

In a publication with Konzeptwerk Neue Ökonomie, Omonuk argues that the impunity of transnational companies enables human rights violations and environmental destruction, calling for the dismantling of unjust legal systems and the enforcement of genuine corporate accountability to secure climate reparations.

In an opinion piece co-authored in Table.Briefings, Omonuk criticizes the lack of progress ten years after the Paris Agreement and calls for fairer COP negotiation structures and greater youth inclusion in global climate policy processes.

== See also ==
- Owiny Hakim
- Vanessa Nakate
- Leah Namugerwa
- Nyombi Morris
- Greta Thunberg
- Evelyn Acham
- Hilda Flavia Nakabuye
