= Tanzania Mbolea and Petrochemical Company =

Coordinates: 10°19′27″S 40°12′13″E

- Type: Private
- Industry: Manufacture of Fertilizer
- Founded: 2016
- Headquarters: Mtwara, Tanzania
- Products: Fertilizer, Ammonia, Urea
- Number of employees: 5,000+ (2020)

Tanzania Mbolea and Petrochemical Company (TMPC), a Tanzanian company that was specifically formed to design, build and operate a fertilizer-manufacturing factory in the Mtwara Region of Tanzania, using natural gas as raw material.

When completed, the plant will be the largest fertilizer-manufacturing factory in Africa, with capacity of 3.8 million metric tonnes of product annually.

== Location ==
The factory is located on 400 hectares (988 acres) of land in Mtwara, in the Mtwara Region, in extreme southeastern Tanzania, "close to large offshore gas plants". This is approximately 565 kilometres (351 mi), by road, southeast of Dar es Salaam, the commercial centre and largest city of Tanzania. This is about 1,005 kilometres (624 mi), by road, southeast of Dodoma, the capital of the country.

== Overview ==
Tanzania Mbolea and Petrochemical Company, is a special purpose vehicle company (SPVC), established in 2016, to specifically design, build and operate the "Mtwara Fertilizer Factory". The consortium in TMPC includes 1. The Tanzania Petroleum Development Corporation (TPDC) 2. Ferrostaal Industrial Projects of Germany 3. Haldor Topsoe AS of Denmark and 4. Fauji Fertiliser Company Limited of Pakistan. This SPV will own 20 percent of the factory. Other potential investors in the factory include National Social Security Fund of Tanzania and Minjingu Mines.

The factory is valued at $3 billion, as of August 2017. The factory is expected to employ a total of 5,000 people, during construction and manufacturing operations. Construction began in 2016, with commissioning expected in 2020. In 2021, the company began building a petrochemical complex in Lindi, Tanzania.

== Ownership ==
Tanzania Mbolea and Petrochemical Company is owned by the following corporate entities as outlined in the table below:

Tanzania Mbolea and Petrochemical Company Stock Ownership
| Rank | Name of Owner | Percentage Ownership |
|---|---|---|
| 1 | Tanzania Petroleum Development Corporation | 25.0 |
| 2 | Ferrostaal Industrial Projects of Germany | 25.0 |
| 3 | Haldor Topsoe AS of Denmark | 25.0 |
| 4 | Fauji Fertiliser Company Limited of Pakistan | 25.0 |
| | Total | 100.00 |

== See also ==
- Mtwara Thermal Power Station
- Tanzania Liquefied Natural Gas Project
- Mtwara–Dar es Salaam Natural Gas Pipeline
