= Uganda Refinery Holding Company =

Government owned parastatal company

Coordinates: 00°18′48″N 32°34′55″E

- Type: Parastatal
- Industry: Petroleum industry
- Founded: 2015
- Key people: Pauline Irene Batebe; Chairwoman; Michael Nkambo Mugerwa; General Manager
- Products: petroleum, oil, gas

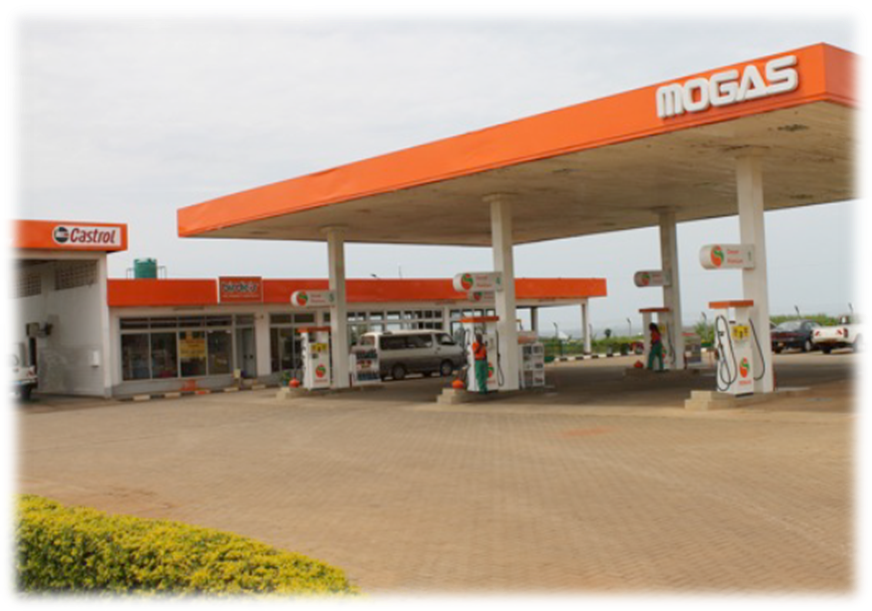
MOGAS Station

Uganda Refinery Holding Company (URHC), is a government of Uganda-owned parastatal company, that is a 100 percent subsidiary of the Uganda National Oil Company, whose purpose is to hold the shareholding in the Uganda Oil Refinery and related infrastructure, that is assigned to the Ugandan government. The company was incorporated as a private limited liability company, under the Companies Act of 2012. The company was incorporated as a private limited liability company, under the Companies Act of 2012.

== Location ==
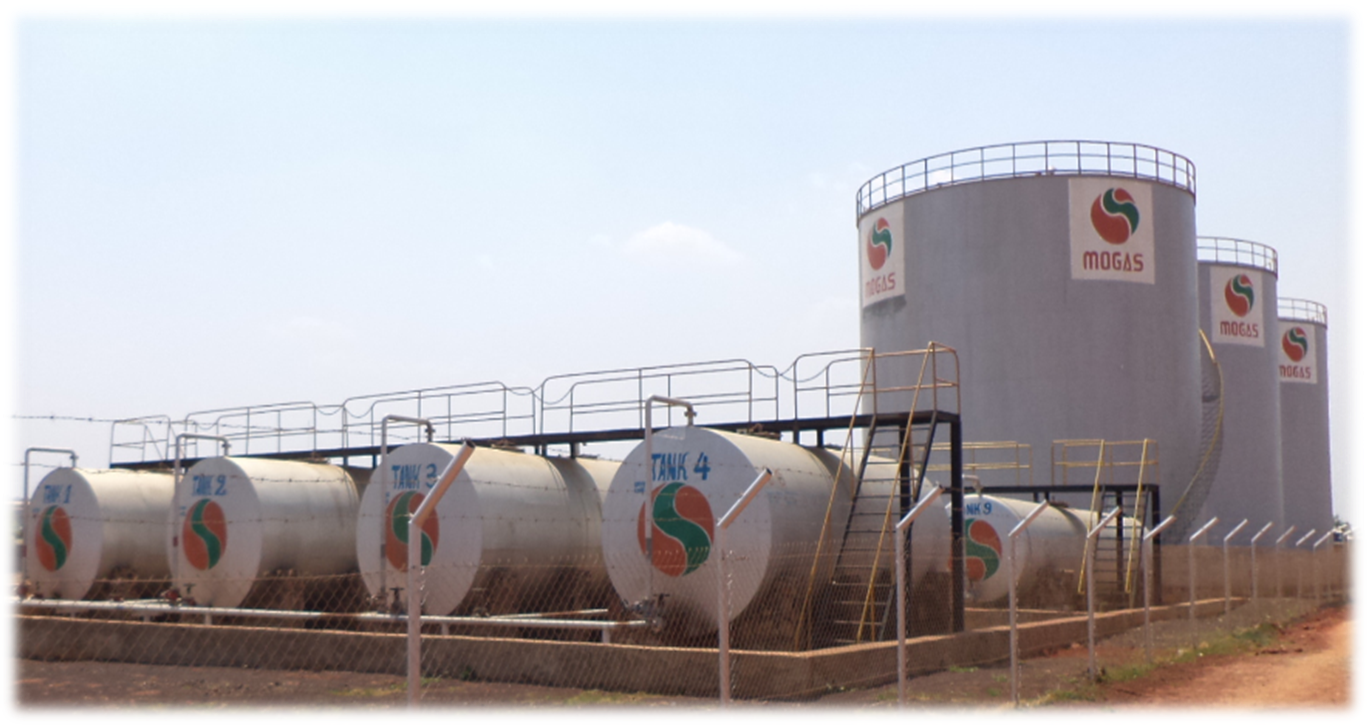
MOGAS Terminal

The headquarters of UNOC are located at the 4th Floor, Amber House, 29-33 Kampala Road in Kampala, Uganda's capital and largest city. The coordinates of UNOC headquarters are: 0°18'48.0"N, 32°34'55.0"E (Latitude:0.313333; Longitude:32.581944).

== See also ==
- Uganda National Oil Company
- Uganda National Pipeline Company
- Uganda-Tanzania Crude Oil Pipeline
- Uganda Oil Refinery
- Petroleum Authority of Uganda
