= Wapakhabulo =

Wapakhabulo is a surname. Notable people with the surname include:

- Angelina Wapakhabulo (born 1949), Ugandan activist
- James Wapakhabulo (1945–2004), Ugandan lawyer and politician
- Josephine Wapakhabulo (born 1976), Ugandan electric engineer, founding CEO of Uganda National Oil Company (June 2016–August 2019).
