= Natural Gas Industry =

- Journal cover of Natural Gas Industry, Vol.45, No.4
- Discipline: Energy
- Language: Chinese
- Edited by: Wen Long (Chinese name: 文龙)

Publication details
- History: 1981–present
- Publisher: Natural Gas Industry Journal Agency (China)
- Frequency: Monthly
- Open access: Yes
- License: CC BY-NC-ND
- ISO 4: Find out here

Indexing
- ISSN: 1000-0976

Links
- Journal homepage; Online Access

Natural Gas Industry is an open-access and peer-reviewed journal dedicated to reporting technological applications in the natural gas industry. Governed by the China National Petroleum Corporation (CNPC) and sponsored by PetroChina Southwest Oil & Gasfield Company, it is currently China's sole scientific publication reporting innovations in upstream, midstream, and downstream sectors of the natural gas industry. The journal is the official publication of Natural Gas Committee of the Chinese Petroleum Society and the Sichuan Petroleum Institute. The editor-in-chief is Wen Long (文龙), Deputy General Manager of PetroChina Southwest Oil & Gasfield Company.

== Overview and history ==
Natural Gas Industry (Chinese name:《天然气工业》) was founded in 1981 as a quarterly journal, originating from China's Sichuan Basin. In 1989, it transitioned to a bimonthly publication, and in 2004, it adopted a monthly frequency to accommodate the growing research output.

In 2014, the journal partnered with Elsevier to co-publish its English-language edition, Natural Gas Industry B, both operated by the Natural Gas Industry Journal Agency. That same year, it was included in the inaugural list of recognized academic journals (5,737 journals in total) by China’s former State Administration of Press, Publication, Radio, Film, and Television (SAPPRFT).

Columns include Spotlights, Geology and Exploration, Development and Production, Drilling Engineering, Storage, Transportation and Gas Processing, Health, Safety, and Environment (HSE), Economic Management, and New Energy Sources.

== Notable article ==
In 2004, the journal published its first academic paper on shale gas research, titled “Reservoiring Mechanism of Shale Gas and Its Distribution”. The paper introduced the concept of “shale gas” to China for the first time. Since then, evaluations of shale gas resource potential and related trials have been conducted across China. To date, it remains the most cited article among all Scopus-indexed papers published by the journal.

Initiated by this research, China entered a shale gas discovery and exploration phase from 2004 to 2012. This phase primarily involved learning from international shale gas exploration and development experiences, conducting theoretical research, and evaluating target areas. It was marked by the re-evaluations of existing wells and new test drilling projects.

== Abstracting and indexing ==
The journal is now indexed and abstracted by Ei Compendex, Scopus, Petroleum Abstracts (PA), Directory of Open Access Journals (DOAJ), and GeoRef. It has a 2025 CiteScore of 11, ranking 9th in the category of Geology (Earth and Planetary Sciences).

== See also ==
- Journal of Petroleum Geology
- Petroleum Geology & Experiment
- Petroleum Geoscience
