= Jane Mulemwa =

Ugandan chemist and educator

- Born: September 18, 1953 (age 72); Eastern Region, Uganda
- Citizenship: Uganda
- Education: Makerere University (Bachelor of Science in chemistry and biology) (Diploma of Education) (Master of Science in chemistry); Queen's University Belfast (Doctor of Philosophy in physical chemistry)
- Occupations: Chemist and educator
- Years active: 1976 — present
- Known for: Education
- Title: Chairperson; Petroleum Authority of Uganda

Jane Nambakire Mulemwa is a Ugandan chemist and educator. She is the chairperson of the Petroleum Authority of Uganda.

== Background and education ==
She was born in the Central Region of Uganda on 18 September 1953. She attended Mount St Mary's College Namagunga. She studied chemistry and biology at Makerere University, graduating with a Bachelor of Science degree and a concurrent Diploma of Education. From 1976 until 1979, she studied for her master's degree in chemistry, also at Makerere. She attended Queen's University Belfast from 1980 until 1982, graduating with a Doctor of Philosophy in chemistry in 1982.

== Career ==
While pursuing her master's degree at Makerere University from 1976 until 1979, Mulemwa taught undergraduates in the Department of Education at the university and taught high school students at the nearby Makerere College School. Between 1980 and 1982, while pursuing her doctorate degree in Belfast, she was a "demonstrator" to undergraduates in chemistry at Queen's University Belfast, Northern Ireland.

She returned to Uganda in 1982 to be a lecturer in chemistry and science education at Makerere University. In 1988, she served as senior lecturer in chemistry and science education at the Department of Science and Technical Education, serving in that capacity until 1998. She then joined the Education Service Commission, rising to the rank of deputy chairperson.

In 2015, she was appointed by President Yoweri Museveni to chair the newly created Petroleum Authority of Uganda, the autonomous regulator of the petroleum industry. In September 2015, Uganda's parliament approved her appointment.

== See also ==
- Uganda Oil Refinery
- Uganda National Oil Company
