= AFRU =

AFRU may refer to:

- Asian Rugby Football Union, now Asia Rugby
- No. 7 Service Flying Training School RAAF, later called the Advanced Flying and Refresher Unit
- Africa Renewal University
