= Ernest Rubondo =

Ugandan geologist and business executive (born 1958)

- Born: 1951 (age 74–75); Western Region, Uganda
- Citizenship: Uganda
- Education: Imperial College London (Master of Science in Petroleum Reservoir Geology)
- Occupations: Geologist and business executive
- Years active: 1990 — present
- Known for: Oil matters
- Title: Executive director Petroleum Authority of Uganda

Ernest Rubondo is a Ugandan geologist and business executive. He served as the executive director of the Petroleum Authority of Ugandafrom June 2016. In 2026, following two consecutive five-year terms in office he retired and was succeeded by Fred Kabanda.

== Background and education ==
He was born in the Western Region of Uganda. He holds a Master of Science in Petroleum Reservoir Geology awarded by the Imperial College London in 1990.

== Career ==
Following his studies in London, he worked briefly with Scott Pickford Plc in the United Kingdom. He returned to Uganda and began to work at the Uganda Ministry of Energy, Oil and Mineral Development. He is a member of the Uganda government team that promotes the country's petroleum potential to industry and also negotiates production sharing agreements with oil companies for acreage in the Albertine Graben. From 2008 until 2014, he served as commissioner for petroleum exploration and production department. He then served as director for petroleum in the Ministry of Energy, Oil and Mineral Development.

In 2015, when the government of Uganda created the Directorate of Petroleum in the Energy ministry, Rubondo was appointed its acting director. In June 2016, he was named executive director of Uganda's Petroleum Authority.

== See also ==
- Uganda Oil Refinery
- Uganda National Oil Company
