= Grace Tubwita =

Ugandan politician

- Born: Uganda
- Occupation: Politician
- Years active: 1996–present

Grace Tubwita Bagaya Bukenya (née Grace Tubwita), commonly known as Grace Tubwita, is a Ugandan female physical planner and politician. She is the Chairperson of the Uganda Institute of Physical Planners.

== Background and career ==
Grace Tubwita was born in Nakasongola District and she speaks the local dialect(Ruluuli). She represented the district in the Uganda parliament on two consecutive times; during the 7th parliament (2001 to 2006) and the 8th parliament (2006 to 2011), on the ruling National Resistance Movement (NRM) political party. She lost her seat during the 2010 NRM primary elections. She lost to Margaret Komuhangi, the incumbent, whom she had defeated twice, in 2003 and 2015.

== Other considerations ==
Tubwita sits on the boards of directors of several companies including the Uganda National Oil Company, the national oil parastatal. She is also a board member of the National Forestry Authority (NFA), another government-owned agency, as announced by then Minister of Information and National Guidance, Rose Namayanja, on 17 July 2014. In September 2016, Tubwita Grace Bagaya Bukenya was awarded the "Parliamentary Medal of Honor" in recognition of her parliamentary service to Uganda.

== See also ==
- Ingrid Turinawe
- Pauline Irene Batebe
