= TPDC =

TPDC may refer to:

- Tai Po District Council, the district council for the Tai Po District in Hong Kong
- Tanzania Petroleum Development Corporation, the national oil company of Tanzania
