= Nabbanja =

Nabbanja is a surname. Notable people with the surname include:

- Proscovia Nabbanja (born 1978), Ugandan geologist and corporate executive
- Robinah Nabbanja (born 1969), Ugandan school teacher, politician and cabinet minister
