= Lamu Oil Refinery =

Planned crude oil refinery on Lamu Island, Kenya

- Location within Kenya
- Location: Lamu Island, Lamu County, Kenya; 02°12′12″S 40°54′57″E

Refinery details
- Opened: 2032 (Expected)
- Capacity: 700,000 barrels per day (110,000 m^{3}/d)

The Lamu Oil Refinery, also the Dangote East Africa Refinery is a crude oil refinery under construction on Lamu Island, in Lamu County, on the shores of the Kenyan Indian Ocean coast. The refinery is planned to be fed by the oil-producing countries of East Africa and suppliers from Central Africa, such as Angola and from West Africa, such as Nigeria. The refined petroleum products of this refinery are primarily intended for use in eight neighboring countries of Eastern Africa, with the rest marketed internationally.

== Location ==
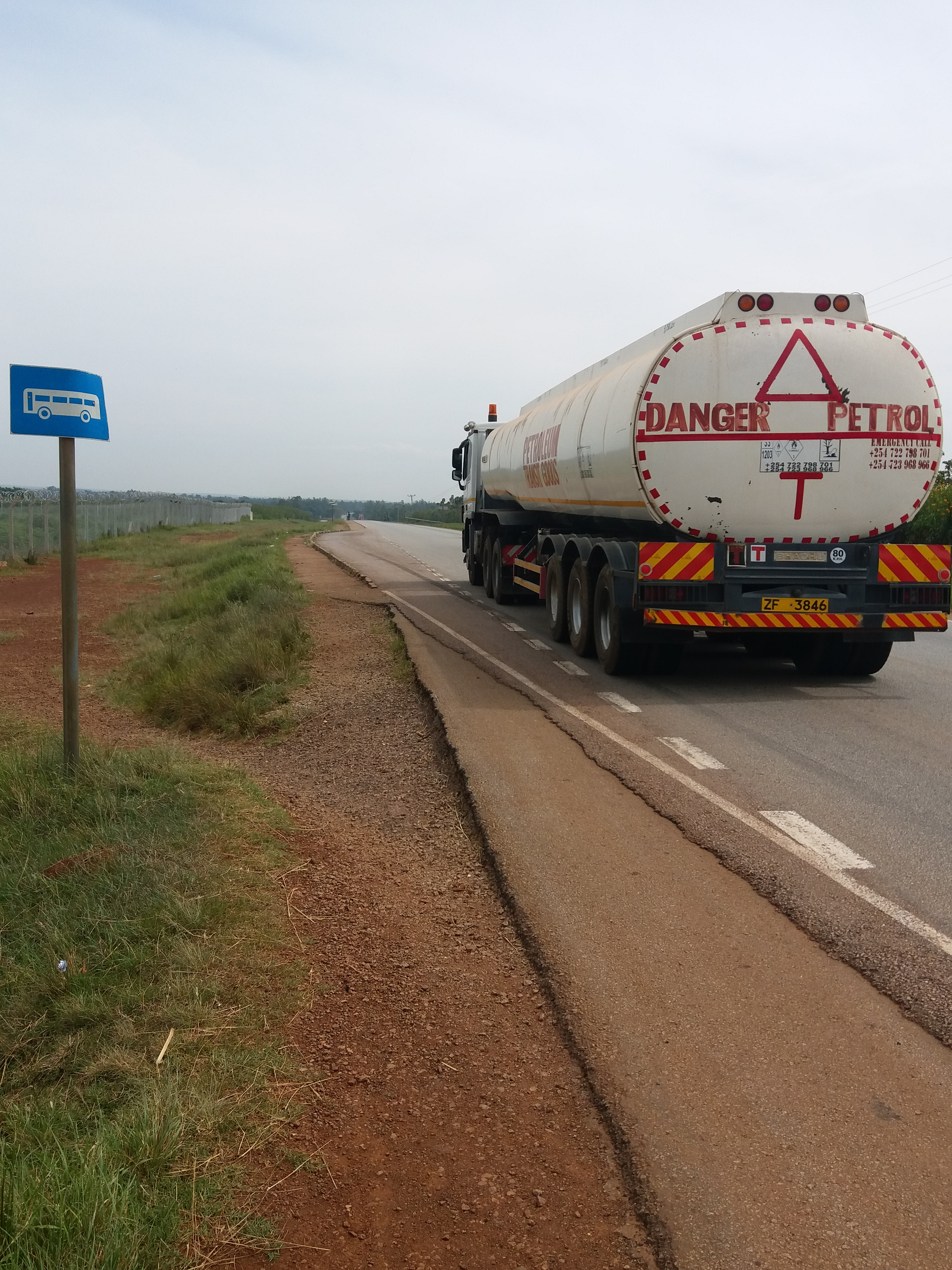
A truck transporting Petroleum oil

The refinery is under construction on the eastern coast of Lamu Island, adjacent to the Port of Lamu, in Lamu County in Kenya. This is approximately 470 kilometres (290 mi) as the crow flies, southeast of Nairobi, Kenya's capital city. Lamu is located approximately 700 kilometres (430 mi), by road southeast Nairobi.

== Overview ==
The refinery is the brainchild of Aliko Dangote, Africa's wealthiest individual and Chairman, President and proprietor of Dangote Group based in Lagos, Nigeria. Initially he wanted to build the refinery in the port city of Tanga, Tanzania. Then attention shifted to Mombasa, Kenya. Finally, the port city of Lamu was selected due to the existence of a deep port, Kenya's advanced economy and the existence of the Lamu Port and Lamu–Southern Sudan–Ethiopia Transport Corridor, a project already in development.

== Specifications ==
The project, which was in the pre-construction phase as of September 2026, is planning a refinery with capacity of 700,000 barrels per day (110,000 m^{3}/d), with construction costs initially estimated at US$17 billion. Crude oil is planned to be sourced from Uganda, Kenya, South Sudan and the Democratic Republic of the Congo. If need be, other African countries will be approached to provide the crude oil. The planned consumer countries of the refined products include Burundi, Ethiopia, Congo-Kinshasa, Kenya, Rwanda, South Sudan, Tanzania and Uganda.

== Ownership ==
The anchor owner is the Dangote Group. It is expected that the governments of several East African countries including Kenya will invest in the project. Mohammed Dewji, the wealthiest individual in Tanzania, has pledged to invest $100 million in the project. In August 2026, it was reported that 30 percent equity in the refinery will be reserved for Eastern African countries. Kenya is committed to 10 percent shareholding. Rwanda and Ethiopia have indicated interest in equity investment. The table below illustrates tentative ownership at that time.

Lamu Oil Refinery Stock Ownership (Tentative)
Rank	Name of Owner	Percentage Ownership
1	Dangote Group	70.0
2	Government of Kenya	10.0
3	Government of Ethiopia	10.0
4	Government of Rwanda	10.0
	Total	100.00

== Developments ==
In July 2026, the government of Kenya appointed a committee headed by Vice President Kithure Kindiki to work with the Dangote Group to get the development project started. The government set aside $165 million as seed capital into the refinery. The construction and operation of the refinery is projected to create an estimated 60,000 direct and indirect jobs.

In August 2026, Aliko Dangote explained that the cost of this refinery had been revised down from US$17 billion to approximately US$16 billion. Breaking ground on construction is tentatively planned in October 2026 with a construction timeline of four to five years. Financing is planned to comprise 30 percent equity and 70 percent debt.

On 26 September 2026, the vessel MV Da Yang docked at the Port of Lamu carrying 2,930 metric tonnes of heavy machinery for the project.

In late September 2026, the Environment and Land Court in Malindi, presided over by Justice Jane Onyango, issued temporary orders halting construction activities, including clearing, excavation, fencing and demolition, on the occupied portions of the project land in the Hindi/Manda Magogoni area of Lamu County. The orders followed a petition by Salim Tima Swale and 132 other residents. The court declined to stop the groundbreaking ceremony and scheduled the matter for further hearing on 14 October 2026.

== Construction ==
Groundbreaking for the construction phase took place on 30 September in a ceremony attended by the Heads of State of six African countries. It is expected to take three years and cost Ksh 2 trillion.

== See also ==
- Kenya Pipeline Company
- Kenya–Uganda–Rwanda Petroleum Products Pipeline
- Dangote Oil Refinery
