= Specioza Kimera Ndagire =

- Born: Uganda
- Citizenship: Uganda
- Occupations: Businesswoman, corporate executive
- Years active: 1995–present

Specioza Kimera Ndagire is a Ugandan businesswoman, and corporate executive. She is the former managing director of Uganda Energy Credit Capitalisation Company (UECCC), a Uganda government parastatal company that coordinates funding from the Ugandan government, international development partners and the private sector, for investment in renewable energy infrastructure in Uganda.

== Career ==
In March 2014, she was appointed as managing director and chief executive officer of UECCC. She was the first person and the first woman to serve in that capacity. The company works with the private sector to identify, survey, attract and source funding for and develop renewable energy power sources in Uganda. UECCC informs and educates Ugandan businesses, including small and medium-sized enterprises on how to sustainably utilize the electricity that they consume.

Prior to her appointment as CEO, Ndagire was the company's general manager for five years from 2009, when the company was established, until 2014, when she was confirmed as the chief executive. The company's focus is to promote investment in the solar sector.
