= Uganda Energy Credit Capitalisation Company =

Ugandan state company

Coordinates: 00°18′48″N 32°34′55″E

Uganda Energy Credit Capitalisation Company (UECCC)
- Company type: Parastatal
- Industry: Energy, Finance
- Founded: 2009; 17 years ago
- Headquarters: Amber House, 3rd Floor; 29-33 Kampala Road; Kampala, Uganda
- Key people: Ramathan Ggoobi; Chairman; Roy Nyamutale Baguma; Managing Director and Chief Executive Officer
- Products: Loans, equity partnerships, financial advisory services, credit guarantees, asset finance
- Total assets: UGX:58.4 billion (US$15.25 million) (June 2022)
- Owner: Government of Uganda
- Website: Homepage

The Uganda Energy Credit Capitalisation Company (UECCC) is a company owned by the government of Uganda. It is responsible for coordinating funding from the Ugandan government, international development partners and the private sector, to invest in renewable energy infrastructure in Uganda, with emphasis on the promotion of private sector participation.

== Location ==
UECCC's headquarters is located in Amber House, at 29-33 Kampala Road, in the centre of Kampala, Uganda's capital and largest city. The coordinates of the company headquarters are 00°18'48.0"N, 32°34'55.0"E (Latitude:0.313340; Longitude:32.581949).

== Overview ==
The company was established in 2009 and coordinates investment into renewable energy sources in the country. The company offers technical, financial, and advisory services to the lending financial institution and to the renewable energy project developer. Services offered include the following: (a) Liquidity refinance option (b) Cash reserving (c) Partial risk guarantee (d) Solar refinance facility to participating microfinance institutions (e) Bridge financing facility (f) Subordinated debt finance (g) Interest rate buy down and (h) Transaction advisory services. Participating international development partners include the World Bank and KfW.

== Ownership ==
The company is jointly owned by the Uganda Ministry of Energy and Mineral Development and the Uganda Ministry of Finance, Planning and Economic Development. As of June 2022, the company's total assets were USh58.4 billion (US$15.257 million). At that time the company was involved in developing nine mini-hydroelectric power stations in the country, that were yet to come online.

== Developments ==
In July 2024, UECCC signed contracts for the construction of the ORIO Mini Hydropower Project, in the Western Region of Uganda. The project involves the construction of 9 mini-grid dams with total capacity of 6.7 MW. The project will benefit up to 71,081 households and 2,300 small and medium enterprises (SMEs) in the districts of Kasese, Bushenyi, Mitooma, Hoima, Kabarole, Bunyangabu and Bundibugyo. The construction is budgeted at USh53.3 billion (approx. US$14.4 million).

HNAC Technology Company Limited from China will be responsible for the civil and hydro-mechanical works. Ossberger GmbH from Germany will be responsible for the design, manufacture, supply, and installation of the electromechanical components. The project is co-financed by the Government of Uganda and the ORIO Infrastructure Fund. The government of the Netherlands provided a grant of €13.1 million towards this project.

== See also ==
- Specioza Kimera Ndagire
- Energy in Uganda
- Economy of Uganda
- List of power stations in Uganda
- Ministry of Energy and Mineral Development (Uganda)
