= Angelina Wapakhabulo =

Ugandan social worker and diplomat

- Born: Angelina Chogo; Tanzania
- Other name: "Mama Angelina" (Uganda)
- Education: University of Dar es Salaam
- Occupations: Social Worker, HIV/AIDS Activist & Diplomat
- Years active: 1980–present
- Title: Former Uganda's High Commissioner to Kenya
- Spouse: James Wapakhabulo

Angelina Chogo Wapakhabulo (widely known as Mama Angelina in Uganda) is a Ugandan social worker and diplomat. She was Uganda's High Commissioner to Kenya. She is a founding member and co-chair of the United Way Board. Wapakhabulo is a community activist and a social worker.

== Career ==
As the Program Coordinator of the Market Vendors AIDS Project (MAVAP), she transformed Kampala's markets into a one stop shopping where vendors and customers do trade but are also encouraged to check their HIV status and get treatment. Wapakhabulo and United Way President and CEO Brian Gallagher represented the United Way at the White House Summit on Malaria in Washington, D.C., on 14 December 2006.

== Personal ==
Wapakhabulo was born and raised in the Iringa District of Tanzania. While a student at the University of Dar es Salaam, she met James Wapakhabulo (23 March 1945 – 27 March 2004), the late former Minister of Foreign Affairs, from 2001 until 2004. They were married and had four children together. Their daughter, Josephine Wapakabulo is the former Executive Director of Uganda National Oil Company.

Wapakhabulo and her husband were contemporaries at Dar es Salaam University, with President Yoweri Museveni in the 1960s.

== See also ==
- Sironko District
- Parliament of Uganda
- Law Development Centre
- Iringa District
