= Hoima–Kampala Petroleum Products Pipeline =

Proposed oil pipeline in Uganda

- Uganda Map of Hoima–Kampala Petroleum Products Pipeline

Location
- Country: Uganda
- Coordinates: 00°54′32″N 31°45′42″E
- Direction: West to East
- Start: Hoima, Uganda
- Passes through: Kiboga, Uganda
- To: Namwabula, Uganda

General information
- Type: Petroleum products pipeline
- Commissioned: 2019 (Expected)

Technical information
- Length: 131 mi (211 km)

The Hoima–Kampala Petroleum Products Pipeline (HKPPP) is a proposed pipeline to transport refined oil products from the Uganda Oil Refinery in Hoima to a distribution terminal near Buloba in Wakiso District, approximately 28 kilometres (17 mi), by road, west of Kampala's central business district.

== Location ==
The pipeline will begin at the Uganda Oil Refinery at Kabaale Township, Buseruka Sub-county, Hoima District, Western Uganda near the international border with the Democratic Republic of the Congo. The pipeline will end at an oil products distribution terminal to be constructed in the neighborhood of Buloba along the Kampala–Mityana Road. The total length of the pipeline will be approximately 211 kilometres (131 mi).

== Background ==
The pipeline will transport various products, including jet fuel, gasoline, kerosene, and diesel fuel. From Buloba, the products will be distributed by truck to various locations in Uganda. Buloba will also be the point of sale to the international market of any excess petroleum products. The Kenya–Uganda–Rwanda Petroleum Products Pipeline will interface with this pipeline at Buloba to ease transfer of product between the two pipelines when needed.

In October 2018, the Uganda National Oil Company (UNOC) secured 300 acres (1.2 km^{2}) of raw land in Namwabula Village, Mpigi District, approximately 28 kilometres (17 mi), west of downtown Kampala, where a greenfield petroleum products depot is being developed.

== Construction ==
As of January 2015, the government of Uganda was evaluating bids by several international firms to determine which had the best plan to construct the pipeline. The selected firm will "conduct a baseline environmental study for the project and generate a blueprint for the pipeline’s route". Another company, yet to be selected, will be hired to implement the resettlement plan for the people who will displaced by the pipeline. All the companies under consideration are from outside Africa, although their names have not been disclosed.

In July 2015, the Ugandan government selected Ramboll Group A/S, a Danish consulting engineering company to conduct a detailed route and environmental study for an oil products pipeline that will run from Hoima to Buloba. The 211 kilometres (131 mi) pipeline will be accompanied by information and communication technology cables, a dual-carriage highway, and power transmission lines between Hoima and Kampala, all contained in a 110 metres (360 ft) "utility corridor". Ramboll's report is expected in about one year.

== Ownership ==
In April 2018, Proscovia Nabbanja, the chief operating officer of Uganda National Oil Company (UNOC), revealed that UNOC will own 51 percent of the Buloba terminal, JK Minerals Africa (South Africa) shall own 20 percent and a strategic partner, yet to be identified, will own 29 percent. The terminal will have capacity of 240,000,000 litres (52,792,620 imp gal; 63,401,293 US gal). The cost of building the fuel products terminal is budgeted at US$51.7 million (USh194 billion), to which UNOC will contribute US$10.5 million (USh39.4 billion), in equity.

== See also ==
- Uganda National Oil Company
- Petroleum Authority of Uganda
