= Uganda National Pipeline Company =

Ugandan company managing national pipeline and storage infrastructure

Coordinates: 00°18′48″N 32°34′55″E

Uganda National Oil Company
- Type: Parastatal
- Industry: Petroleum industry
- Founded: 2015
- Key people: John Bosco Habumugisha; General Manager
- Products: petroleum, oil, gas
- Website: Homepage

UNPC was incorporated under the Companies Act of 2012, with the main objective being to hold the Uganda Government's interest in the East African Crude Oil Pipeline, the Hoima-Kampala Petroleum Products Pipeline and the natural gas pipelines together with storage facilities and associated infrastructure, within the country's nascent petroleum industry.

Uganda National Pipeline Company (UNPC), whose official name is National Pipeline Company Uganda Limited (NPCUL), is a Ugandan private limited liability company that is a 100 percent subsidiary of the Uganda National Oil Company (UNOC).

== Location ==
The headquarters of UNOC are located at the 4th Floor, Amber House, 29-33 Kampala Road in Kampala, Uganda's capital and largest city. The coordinates of UNOC headquarters are: 0°18'48.0"N, 32°34'55.0"E (Latitude:0.313333; Longitude:32.581944).

== See also ==
- Ministry of Energy and Mineral Development (Uganda)
- Uganda Refinery Holding Company
- Uganda Oil Refinery
- Uganda-Tanzania Crude Oil Pipeline
