= Mtwara–Dar es Salaam Natural Gas Pipeline =

Location
- Coordinates: 08°25′11″S 39°09′34″E
- Direction: South to North
- Start: Mtwara, Tanzania
- Passes through: Somanga, Tanzania
- To: Dar es Salaam, Tanzania

General information
- Type: Natural gas pipeline
- Commissioned: 10 October 2015

Technical information
- Length: 331 mi (533 km)

The Mtwara–Dar es Salaam Natural Gas Pipeline (MDNGP) is a pipeline that transports natural gas from Tanzania's natural gas fields in Mnazi Bay, Mtwara Region to Dar es Salaam.

== Location ==
The pipeline starts in Madimba Village, in Mtwara Region, in southeastern Tanzania, and runs in a northerly direction, through Somanga, in Lindi Region, to end at Dar es Salaam, Tanzania's largest city, a total distance of approximately 542 kilometres (337 mi).

== Background ==
As of October 2015, Tanzania's total electricity generation capacity stood at 1,500 MW. In 2014, hydro-power generation represented 33 percent of total capacity. Due to prolonged drought, hydro turned out to be an unreliable power source for the country. In order to diversify the national energy pool, and to take advantage of the vast natural gas resources onshore and offshore in the Mtwara and Lindi regions, a natural gas pipeline was designed and constructed, to deliver the natural gas to Dar es Salaam for use in power generation, industrial applications, household cooking and in propulsion of transport vehicles.

== Technical details ==
The main pipeline from Madimba in Mtwara Region, to Dar es Salaam, measures 36 inches (91 cm) in diameter. At Somanga, in Lindi Region, the main pipeline is joined by a smaller 24 inches (61 cm) pipeline delivering natural gas from Songo Songo Island. Both processing plants, one in Madimba and the other in Songo Songo, are two trains (processing units) each, and together are capable of processing 350,000,000 cubic feet (9,910,896 m^{3}) of natural gas every 24 hours.

== Construction, funding and time table ==
The construction contract was awarded to China Petroleum and Technology Development Company, a subsidiary of China National Petroleum Company, with a US$1.225 billion concessional loan from Exim Bank of China. The Tanzania Petroleum Development Corporation invested US$274.492 million into the project. Construction began in June 2013, with commissioning in October 2015. The contract included the construction of the two-train gas processing plant in Madimba Village, Mtwara Region.

== See also ==
- Tanesco
- Tanzania Liquefied Natural Gas Project
- Tanzania Petroleum Development Corporation
- List of power stations in Tanzania
- Uganda–Tanzania Crude Oil Pipeline
