= Africa Renewal University =

Private Christian university in Uganda

Africa Renewal University logo
- Former names: Gaba Bible Institute; Africa Renewal Christian College
- Established: 2007
- Chancellor: Peter Kasirivu
- Location: Buloba, Wakiso District, Uganda; 00°19′34″N 32°26′27″E
- Website: afru.ac.ug
- Location in Uganda

Africa Renewal University (AfRU) is a private Chartered Christian university in Uganda. It was founded in 2007 as the Gaba Bible Institute, before being renamed Africa Renewal Christian College. The university's main focus was founded based on Africa's great need for Christian leaders to rise up to share the compassion of Christ and the gospel of hope in a church and society that is desperately longing for transformation. At the end of 2013, it received a Provisional License from the Uganda National Council for Higher Education to be a Private University. It was then launched under its present name in early 2014.

== See also ==
- Education in Uganda
- List of universities in Uganda
