= Proscovia Nabbanja =

Ugandan geologist and corporate executive

- Born: 1978 (age 47–48); Uganda
- Citizenship: Uganda
- Education: Makerere University (Bachelor of Science in geology and chemistry); Imperial College London (Master of Science in Petroleum Geoscience); Imperial College Business School (Master of Business Administration & Management); Institute for Petroleum Management Inc. (Certificate in International Petroleum, Oil and Gas Management)
- Occupations: Geologist and corporate executive
- Years active: 2000–present
- Title: CEO of Uganda National Oil Company

Proscovia Nabbanja is a Ugandan geologist and corporate executive, who is the chief executive officer of the Uganda National Oil Company, since 1 October 2019. From 15 August 2019 until 1 October 2019, she was the acting CEO at the company. She replaced the founding CEO, Josephine Wapakabulo.

Previously, between November 2016 and August 2019, Nabbanja was the chief operating officer (upstream) of the Uganda National Oil Company. Prior to that, she was a senior geologist at the Petroleum Exploration and Production Department (PEPD), in the Uganda Ministry of Energy and Mineral Development, the first woman to hold that position.

== Background and education ==
Nabbanja was educated at Makerere University, Uganda's oldest and largest public university, graduating with a Bachelor of Science in geology and chemistry. Later, she obtained a Master of Science in Petroleum Geoscience, from the Imperial College of Science, Technology and Medicine, in London, United Kingdom. She also holds a Master of Business Administration awarded by the Imperial College Business School, obtained in 2017. Her Certificate in International Petroleum, Oil and Gas Management was awarded by the Institute for Petroleum Management Inc., in Austin, Texas, United States.

== Career ==
Nabbanja was hired by PEPD in 2000, right out of Makerere University, being the first female technical staff member to be employed there. Over the years, she was promoted and as of May 2013, she was at the rank of senior geologist. In that capacity, she supervised a team of professionals who review the technical proposals from the oil companies, on all oil wells-related issues. The team collects data which is used to estimate how much oil and gas lies beneath the ground in the country. For a period of nineteen months, from April 2015 until October 2016, Nabbanja was acting principal geologist at PEPD, the position she left to join UNOC.

In October 2019, the UNOC Board of Directors confirmed Nabbanja as the substantive CEO at the company.

== Personal life ==
Nabbanja is a married mother of three children.

== Other responsibilities ==
Nabanjja was appointed by Minister of Health in 2020 as a member of the board of directors of Malaria Free Uganda, a private public initiative by the Government of Uganda under the Ministry of Health charged with helping the National Malaria Control Division (NMCD) in removing barriers towards implementation of a national strategic plan through advocacy, resource mobilization and accountability to stakeholders.

== See also ==
- Cabinet of Uganda
- Economy of Uganda
