= Uganda Atomic Energy Council =

- UAEC

Agency overview
- Formed: 2009
- Jurisdiction: Government of Uganda
- Headquarters: Kampala, Uganda
- Agency executives: Chairman, Akisophel Kisolo; Secretary general
- Parent agency: Uganda Ministry of Energy and Mineral Development
- Website: Homepage

The Uganda Atomic Energy Council (UAEC) is a corporate body, established by the Atomic Energy Act of 2008, which was enacted by the Parliament of Uganda.

== Location ==
The headquarters and offices of UAEC are located in Amber House at 29-33 Kampala Road, in the central business district of Kampala, the capital city of Uganda. The coordinates of the agency's headquarters are:0°18'49.0"N, 32°34'54.0"E (Latitude:0.313611; Longitude:32.581667).

== Overview ==
UAEC is responsible for the regulation of the peaceful applications of ionising radiation, with the following specific objectives: (a) Protect the safety of individuals, society, and the environment from the dangers resulting from ionising radiation (b) Provide for the production and use of radiation sources and the management of radioactive waste (c) Provide for compliance with international safety requirements for the use of ionising radiation, radiation protection, and security of radioactive sources.

== National outlook ==
Since 2012, Uganda has indicated its willingness, determination, and intention to develop nuclear power for peaceful means, using locally available uranium deposits. With an electrification rate of 20 percent as of June 2016, according to the Uganda Bureau of Statistics, the country will need more than what it can develop from hydroelectric sites, to satisfy the need for electricity nationwide. The country plans to generate 40,000 megawatts of electricity to meet its goals under the Vision 2040 development plan. In October 2016, Uganda asked Russia for help in the development of nuclear power.

== Board of directors ==
The five-member board included the following members as of July 2009:

1. Akisophel Kisolo, academic physicist, chairman
2. Rosemary Nsaba Byanyima - consultant radiologist
3. Maxiwell Otim - biomedical scientist
4. Kirya Kabanda - hydrological engineer.

== See also ==
- Uganda Revenue Authority
- Insurance Regulatory Authority of Uganda
- Uganda Retirement Benefits Regulatory Authority
- National Social Security Fund (Uganda)
