= Kenya–Uganda–Rwanda Petroleum Products Pipeline =

Oil pipeline in Africa

- East Africa Map of Kenya–Uganda–Rwanda Petroleum Products Pipeline

Location
- Country: Kenya; Uganda; Rwanda
- Coordinates: 01°33′00″N 31°09′36″E
- Direction: East to West
- Start: Mombasa, Kenya
- Passes through: Kampala, Uganda
- To: Kigali, Rwanda

General information
- Type: Oil products
- Partners: Kenya; Uganda; Rwanda
- Commissioned: 2030 (Expected)

Technical information
- Length: 1,100 mi (1,800 km)

The Kenya–Uganda–Rwanda Petroleum Products Pipeline is a pipeline that carries refined petroleum products from the Kenyan port city of Mombasa to the country's capital of Nairobi and continues to the city of Eldoret in the Eastern Rift Valley. There are plans to extend the pipeline to Uganda's capital, Kampala, continuing on to Rwanda's capital, Kigali.

== Location ==
The pipeline originates in the Indian Ocean port of Mombasa and travels to Nairobi, continuing to Eldoret. That part of the pipeline is in existence as of May 2014.

It has been proposed that the pipeline be extended to Kigali, Rwanda, through Kampala, Uganda. The route of the pipeline, as proposed, stretches over a distance of approximately 1,800 kilometres (1,100 mi).

== Background ==
The pipeline extension will connect Eldoret in Kenya to Kampala in Uganda, passing through Malaba. The pipeline will extend to Kigali in Rwanda and possibly to Bujumbura, Burundi in the future. Each country will be responsible for developing the infrastructure within its borders; however, a joint "transaction advisor" will be selected to maintain quality control.

== Construction ==
The feasibility study for the Eldoret to Kampala pipeline extension was awarded to an international firm in 1997. The study was completed in 1998, and the report was submitted the following year. The study was funded by the European Investment Bank. The report indicated that building the pipeline was feasible. The feasibility study for the Kampala to Kigali extension was awarded to the East African Community in September 2011, funded with $600,000 from the African Development Bank. The governments of Kenya, Uganda, and Rwanda accepted the findings of both feasibility studies.

The construction contract was initially awarded, in 2007, to Tamoil, a company owned by the government of Libya. That contract was voided in 2012 after the company failed to implement the project. As of April 2014, fourteen companies have submitted bids to construct the pipeline extension from Kenya to Rwanda. Construction was expected to begin in 2014, with a 32-month construction timeframe. Commissioning was expected in 2016.

== Construction costs ==
The total construction cost for the Eldoret-Kampala-Kigali portion of the pipeline is estimated at approximately US$5 billion. In November 2014, the International Finance Corporation, an arm of the World Bank, pledged to lend US$600 million towards the construction of the Eldoret-Kampala section of the project.

== Developments ==
In May 2024, the presidents of Kenya and Uganda jointly agreed to extend this pipeline from Eldoret in Kenya to Kampala in Uganda. The first meeting to plan this extension was convened in Nairobi, Kenya between Kenyan and Ugandan authorities, in July 2024. The same intention was re-stated in December 2024 by representatives of the governments of Rwanda, Uganda and Kenya who met in Entebbe, Uganda.

== See also ==
- Uganda Oil Refinery
- Uganda National Oil Company
- Petroleum Authority of Uganda
- Uganda–Kenya Crude Oil Pipeline
- Hoima–Kampala Petroleum Products Pipeline
- Uganda–Tanzania Crude Oil Pipeline
