= Guo Xusheng =

Chinese geologist (born 1965)

- 郭旭升
- Born: April 1965 (age 61); Chiping District, Liaocheng, Shandong, China
- Education: Shandong Normal University
- Scientific career
- Fields: Oil-gas exploration
- Workplaces: Sinopec Exploration Company

Guo Xusheng (Chinese: 郭旭升; pinyin: Guō Xùshēng; born April 1965) is a Chinese geologist specializing in oil-gas exploration. He is an academician of the Chinese Academy of Engineering (CAE) and serves as general manager of the Sinopec Exploration Company.

== Biography ==
Guo was born in Chiping District of Liaocheng, Shandong, in April 1965. He holds a bachelor's degree and a master's degree from Shandong Normal University. After graduating in 1988, he assumed various posts in the Shengli Oilfield Geological Research Institute, including assistant, engineer, and senior engineer. He joined the Sinopec Exploration Company in June 2000, becoming its general manager in December 2007.

== Honours and awards ==
- January 2014 Li Siguang Geological Science Award
- 2016 Science and Technology Progress Award of the Ho Leung Ho Lee Foundation
- November 22, 2019 Member of the Chinese Academy of Engineering (CAE)
