= Tanzania Liquefied Natural Gas Project =

- Location within Tanzania
- Location: Lindi, Lindi, Lindi Region, Tanzania, Tanzania; 09°57′36″S 39°42′32″E

Refinery details
- Opened: 2025 (expected)

The Tanzania Liquefied Natural Gas Project (TLNGP), also Likong’o-Mchinga Liquefied Natural Gas Project (LMLNGP), is a planned liquefied natural gas processing plant in Tanzania.

== Location ==
The plant would be located on approximately 2,071.705 hectares (5,119 acres) in Likong'o Village in the town of Lindi on the Indian Ocean coast, approximately 461 kilometres (286 mi), by road, south of Dar es Salaam. This is about 103 kilometres (64 mi), by road, north-west of Mtwara, the nearest large town.

== Overview ==
Tanzania has proven natural gas reserves of 57 trillion cubic feet, with at least 49.5 trillion cubic feet of those reserves far offshore in the Indian Ocean. The government of Tanzania, through the Tanzania Petroleum Development Corporation, in partnership with the BG Group (a division of Shell), Equinor, ExxonMobil, and Ophir Energy, plans to build an onshore liquefied natural gas export terminal at this location in Lindi.

== History ==
The first offshore discovery of natural gas in Tanzania was made in 2010. Since then, other finds have been made by several petroleum prospecting companies, which decided in 2014 to build a liquefaction facility in Lindi, targeting primarily the Asian market. In August 2016, Tanzanian President John Magufuli publicly urged government bureaucrats to fast track the project so that construction could start. The government of Tanzania announced in May 2016 its plan to build a gas pipeline to neighboring Uganda.

== Stakeholders ==
Talks between the government of Tanzania and the six oil companies involved in the project began in earnest in September 2016.

As of 2022, the oil companies involved included:

- Equinor
- ExxonMobil
- Ophir Energy
- Pavilion Energy
- Shell

Also participating in the talks were the following parastatal agencies of the Tanzanian government.

- Tanzania Petroleum Development Corporation
- Petroleum Upstream Regulatory Authority
- Tanzania Electric Supply Company

== Negotiations ==
In May 2018, The East African reported that the government of Tanzania was searching for a transaction adviser, to guide the Tanzania Petroleum Development Company through negotiations for a host government agreement with the gas project developers. The two year contract for the selected adviser involves the development of a technical, legal and commercial framework for the LNG project. The adviser is also responsible for supporting and building capacity of the government team, as well as crafting the appropriate strategy in the negotiations towards the host government agreement. In June 2018, the Tanzanian English-language newspaper The Citizen reported that the projected start date had changed to 2022. In 2022, the government finalized an agreement with the companies for the construction of the LNG. A team of experts was in negotiations with some investors, as the project will be executed in Lindi region. The project is all set to begin soon.

== Construction ==
In May 2019, the EastAfrican newspaper reported that construction was planned to start in 2022 and conclude in 2028, as announced by the Tanzanian Minister of Energy, Medard Kalemani. In June 2022, the government of Tanzania signed agreements with Equinor of Norway and British Shell, reviving discussions and negotiations about moving the project forward. Final investment decision (FID) of this project, whose development cost is projected at US$30 billion, is now expected in 2025.

In May 2023, TanzaniaInvest reported that Jared Kuehl, Shell's vice president for Tanzania and country chair, disclosed that in the coming weeks, the International Energy Companies (IECs) involved in the Tanzania LNG project anticipated signing a host government agreement (HGA) for the onshore elements of the project, and a production sharing agreement (PSA) for its upstream component. However, there were no official updates from the parties involved after that announcement. In March 2024, the United States issued a serious warning to Tanzanian authorities regarding delays in finalizing negotiations for the country's lucrative liquefied natural gas project.

In May 2024, The Citizen newspaper reported that Tanzania's attorney general had raised queries on the draft HGA submitted for his vetting.

== See also ==
- Mtwara–Dar es Salaam Natural Gas Pipeline
