= Evelyn Acham =

Ugandan climate activist

- Born: Evelyn Acham
- Citizenship: Uganda
- Occupation: Climate justice activist
- Years active: 2017–present
- Political party: Rise Up Movement

Evelyn Acham (born circa 15 June 1991) is a climate justice activist from Kampala Uganda and national Ugandan coordinator of the Rise Up Movement, which was founded by her friend and fellow organizer Vanessa Nakate.

== Career ==
Acham is part of the +1Tree Project, where her goal is to plant 9,000,000 trees.

On May 26, 2020, Acham was one of the panelists for ActionAid and Women's Agenda's webinar series "Women Leading Climate Action", a virtual interactive discussion on how women were fighting climate change during COVID-19.

Acham presented alongside Inge Relph, the executive director and co-founder of Global Choices, and Emma Wilkin, the coordinator of Global Choices' Arctic Angels, at the 2020 Model United Nations (MUN) Impact Global Summit.

In 2021, she attended the 2021 United Nations Climate Change Conference and represented Fridays For Future's Most Affected People and Areas (MAPA). Fridays for Future MAPA was one of the climate advocacy groups that formed after Climate activists Greta Thunberg's 2018 strike.

Acham is a co-founder of Climate Justice for Healthy Communities (CJHC), a non-governmental organization based in Kampala, Uganda. The organization's mission is to safeguard and enhance the health and well-being of individuals, particularly those in high-risk communities, from the hazards associated with climate change, Acham is working in conjunction with the Girl on the Move initiative, which was established by her fellow activist Isaac Ssentumbwe, to offer vocational training to 5,000 girls who have abandoned their education as a result of climate change by 2030. Acham was featured in The New York Times' 2021 Climate Hub discussion "Passing the Torch: Intergenerational Climate Dialogues", alongside Jerome Foster II, Aya Chebbi, and Mary Robinson.

Acham's other affiliations include Youth for Future Africa and Global Choices' action network, Arctic Angels.

== Awards and recognition ==
- Became a Global Witness Advisory Council member in 2022
- Voted among the 100 women creating a better Africa in 2023
- Volunteered as an Arctic Angel with Global Choices since 2020
- Active member of Fridays For Future MAPA since 2020
- Attended and spoke at COP26 in Scotland, the inauguration ceremony of the mayor of Grenoble in France, and speaker at the Austrian world summit and Youth Climate Conservation Summit at Princeton University
