= Owiny Hakim =

Ugandan activist (born 1986)

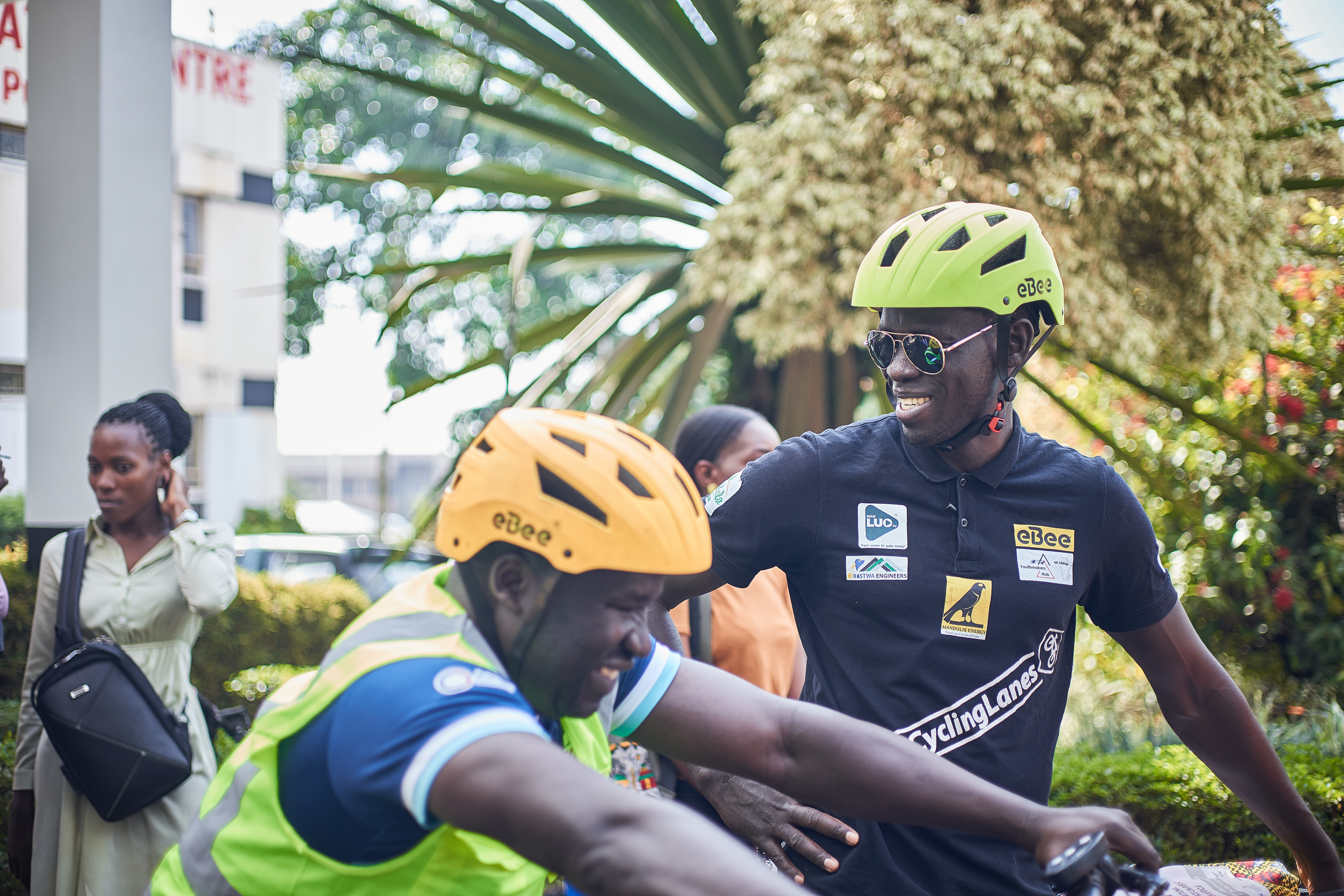
- Hakim, on the right in black T-shirt and green helmet
- Born: April 13, 1986 (age 40); Uganda
- Education: Bachelor's degree in Public Administration, Kampala International University
- Occupations: Community civic educator, environmental conservation activist
- Known for: Cycling 650–655 km from Uganda to Nairobi (2023) to advocate for safe cycling lanes and attend the Africa Climate Summit; Walking 2,421 km to Addis Ababa (2019) to popularize Africa Agenda 2063; Mandela Washington Fellow (2021)
- Notable work: Climate activism, civic education for youth
- Awards: Mandela Washington Fellowship (2021)

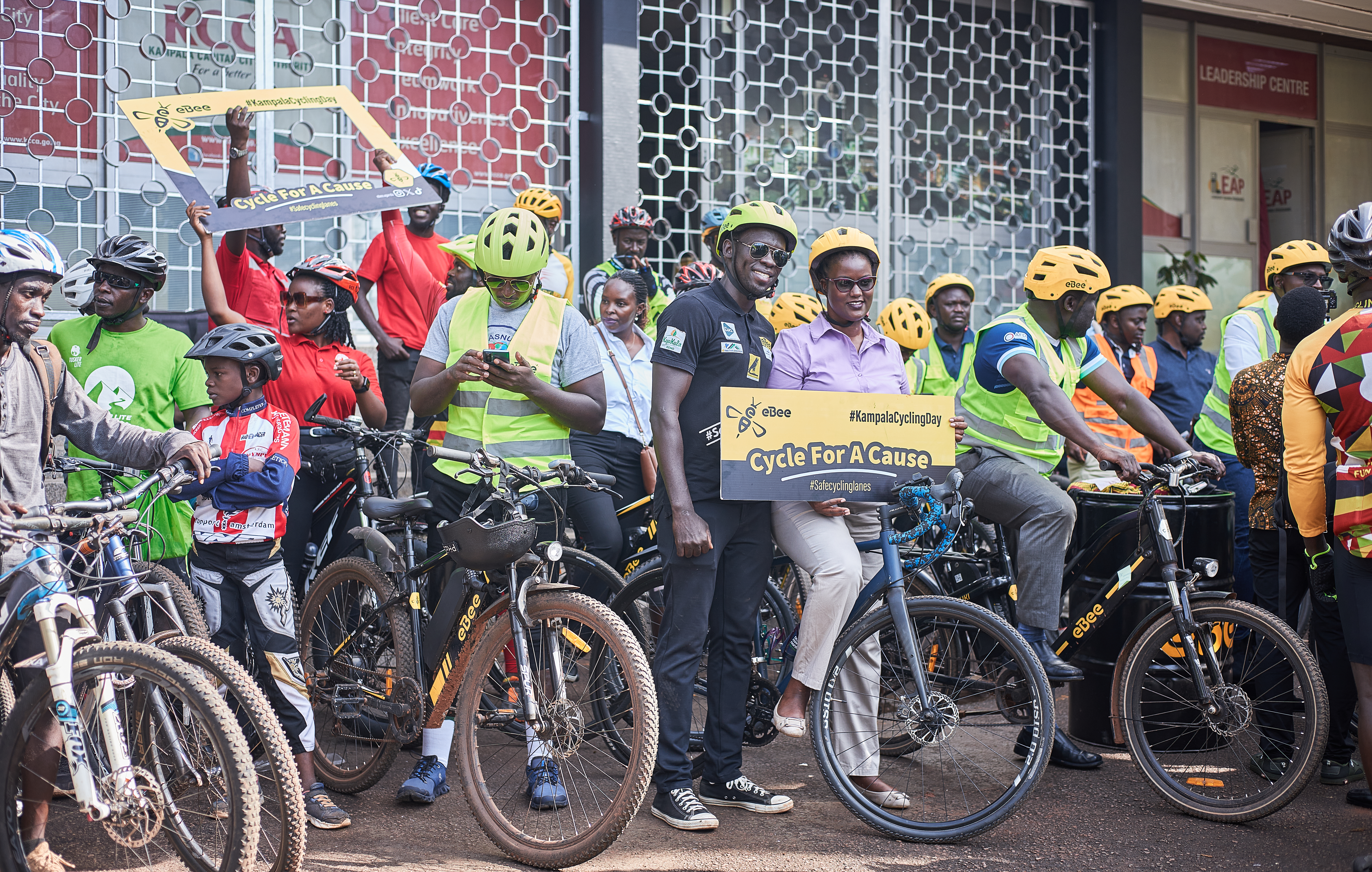
Hakim (in black T-shirt and green helmet)

Owiny Hakim (born 13 April 1986) is a Ugandan community civic educator and environmental conservation activist. He cycled about 650–655 kilometers from Uganda to Nairobi Kenya to create awareness about safe city cycling lanes on Uganda's road network in 2023, and to attend Africa Climate Summit 2023 in Nairobi, Kenya to discuss mechanisms for mitigating climate change. In 2019, Hakim walked to Addis Ababa, Ethiopia for two months, covering a distance of 2,421 kilometres (km) to popularize Africa's agenda for 2063. He was the 2021 Mandela Washington Fellow.

== Early life and background ==
In the early 1980s, Hakim grew up in internally displaced persons (IDP) camps in Northern Uganda, which experienced conflict and political instability, disinformation and misinformation fueled violence, social division, and unrest due to the rampant spread of false characterizations of the people in IDP camps as violent.

In 2014, he lost a friend named Akena to a shooting in Kampala, having survived Lord's Resistance Army (LRA) rebellion days. Both Hakim and Akena went to Layibi College in Gulu district and then sat for advanced level in 2004.

Hakim studied at Kampala International University and attained a bachelor's degree in Public administration.

== Activism ==
Hakim is a community educator who has empowered youth to examine community challenges and seek to prevent crises and violence, with the major goal of developing safe and inclusive communities for the next generation.
