= Buloba =

- Map of Uganda showing the location of Buloba
- Coordinates: 00°19′30″N 32°27′00″E
- Country: Uganda
- Region: Central Uganda
- District: Wakiso District
- County: Busiro
- Constituency: Busiro East

Government
  - Member of Parliament: Medard Lubega Sseggona

Area
  - Total: 13 km^{2} (5.0 sq mi)
- Elevation: 1,170 m (3,840 ft)
- Time zone: UTC+3 (EAT)

Buloba is an urban area in Wakiso District in the Buganda Region of Uganda. The area is primarily a middle-class residential neighborhood.

== Location ==
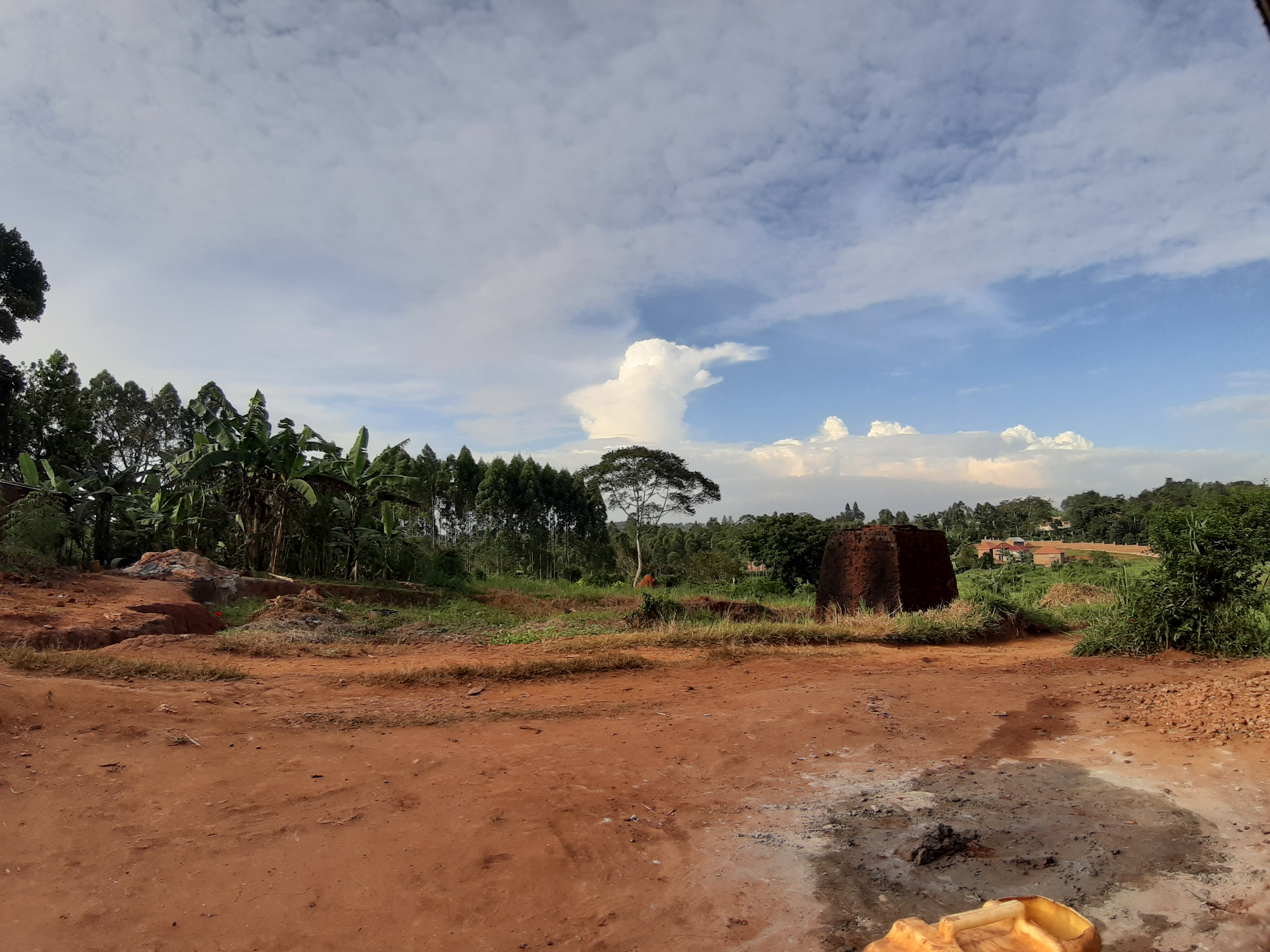
Buloba, off Mityana Road at Kinyanya, Kilimamboga

Buloba is on the tarmacked Kampala–Mityana Road. It is approximately 22 kilometres (14 mi), by road, west of Kampala, Uganda's capital and largest city. The coordinates of Buloba Main, immediately north of Buloba Police Station are 0°19'30.0"N, 32°27'26.0"E (Latitude:0.325000; Longitude:32.457222). It lies at an average elevation of 1,170 metres (3,839 ft), above sea level.

== Overview ==
Buloba is divided into four administrative zones, from east to west: (a) Buloba ku Mwenda ("Buloba Nine Miles"), approximately 9 miles (14 km) west of Kampala (b) Buloba Kasero, about 10.5 miles (17 km) west of Kampala (c) Buloba Main, about 12 miles (19 km) west of Kampala and (d) Buloba Kiweesa, about 14 miles (23 km) west of Kampala. The neighborhood of Buloba has an estimated size of 1,295 hectares (3,200 acres) or 13 km2.

When the Uganda Oil Refinery is built, it is anticipated that Hoima–Kampala Petroleum Products Pipeline, the refined petroleum products will be piped to a location near Buloba, for distribution within Kampala and other towns such as Entebbe.

== Points of interest ==
Buloba Police Station, an establishment of the Uganda Police Force, is located in "Buloba Main". Health facilities include Buloba Health Centre and Lynaset Health Care Services.

The neighborhood also hosts Buloba High School, Buloba Teacher's Training College, Buloba Vocational Institute and a campus of Africa Renewal University. Kasero Church of Uganda and St. Peter Catholic Church are also located here.
