= Journal of Petroleum Geology =

- Discipline: Petroleum geology
- Language: English
- Edited by: Christopher Tiratsoo

Publication details
- History: 1978–present
- Publisher: Wiley-Blackwell on behalf of Scientific Press Ltd.
- Frequency: Quarterly
- Impact factor: 1.872 (2017)

Standard abbreviations
- ISO 4: J. Pet. Geol.

Indexing
- ISSN: 1747-5457
- LCCN: 2005265047
- OCLC no.: 300302561

Links
- Journal homepage; Online access; Online archive

The Journal of Petroleum Geology is a quarterly peer-reviewed scientific journal covering the geology of petroleum and natural gas. It was established in 1978 and is published by Wiley-Blackwell on behalf of Scientific Press Ltd. The editor-in-chief is Christopher Tiratsoo (Scientific Press Ltd.). According to the Journal Citation Reports, the journal has a 2017 impact factor of 1.872, ranking it 99th out of 190 journals in the category "Geosciences, Multidisciplinary".
