= Ruth Nankabirwa =

Ugandan politician (born 1965)

Hon Ruth Nankabirwa
- Born: November 28, 1965 (age 60); Kiboga, Uganda
- Citizenship: Uganda
- Education: Makerere University (BA in Fine Art) (MA in Peace & Conflict Studies)
- Occupations: Artist & Politician
- Years active: 1994 — present
- Known for: Politics
- Title: Minister of Energy and Mineral Development

Ruth Nankabirwa Ssentamu (born 28 November 1965) is a Ugandan politician who serves as the Minister of Energy and Mineral Development in the Ugandan Cabinet, effective 8 June 2021. Although she told her supporters "If the cows vote, let them vote, I want to get 120%" she lost her seat as Women MP for Kiboga District in January 2021.

Before that, from 1 March 2015 until 3 May 2021, she served as the Chief Government Whip, a Cabinet-level position in Uganda. replacing Justine Lumumba Kasule, who was given the post of Secretary General of the ruling National Resistance Movement political party in Uganda on 23 December 2014. Prior to that, from 27 May 2011 until 1 March 2015, Nankabirwa served as the State Minister for Fisheries in the Cabinet of Uganda replacing Fred Mukisa, who was dropped from the cabinet. Prior to that, she served as State Minister for Microfinance, from 16 February 2009 until 27 May 2011.

== Early life and education ==
Ruth Nankabirwa was born on 28 November 1965. She hails from Kiboga District in Central Uganda. She attended Bamusuuta Primary School for her Primary Education. She studied at Nabisunsa Girls' Secondary School, for both O-Level and A-Level education. She holds a Bachelor of Arts degree in Fine Art from Makerere University. She also holds the degree of Master of Arts in Conflict Studies, also from Makerere.

== Career ==
From 1994 through 1995, she served as a delegate to the Constituent Assembly. In 1996, Ruth Nankabirwa was elected to serve as the member of parliament for Woman Delegate for Kiboga District. She held that position from 1996 until 2021. From 1998 through 2001, she served as Minister of State for Luweero Triangle in the Office of the Prime Minister. Between 2001 and 2009, she served as State Minister for Defense, a post she held until she was appointed to be the State Minister for Microfinance. In the Cabinet reshuffle of 27 May 2011, she was moved to the Fisheries Ministry as State Minister, a position she held until she was named Chief Government Whip.

Ruth Nankabirwa has been a regular attendee and speaker at the annual Ugandan North American Association (UNAA) convention in the USA.

== See also ==
- Cabinet of Uganda
- Parliament of Uganda
- Kiboga District
