= Ministry of Energy and Mineral Development (Uganda) =

Government ministry of Uganda

Coordinates: 00°18′48″N 32°34′55″E

- Coat of Arms of Uganda

Ministry overview
- Type: Ministry
- Jurisdiction: Government of Uganda
- Headquarters: Amber House Kampala Road Kampala, Uganda
- Ministry executive: Hon. Ruth Ssentamu Nankabirwa, Minister of Energy and Mineral Development
- Website: Homepage

The Ministry of Energy and Mineral Development, also Ministry of Energy, Oil and Mineral Development is one of the governmental bodies of Uganda. The ministry has the function of developing and implementing policies related to electricity, minerals, petroleum and petroleum products. The ministry is part of the national cabinet and is headed by a cabinet minister. The current Cabinet Minister of Energy is [Hon. Ruth Ssentamu Nankabirwa].

== Location ==
The headquarters of the ministry are located in Amber House on Kampala Road in the Kampala Central Division in Kampala, the capital and largest city of the country. The coordinates of the headquarters are 0°18'48.0"N, 32°34'55.0"E (Latitude:0°18'48.0"N; Longitude:32°34'55.0"E)

== Scope of activities ==
The ministry is responsible for energy policy, investments in mining, and the establishment of new power generating infrastructure using hydro power, thermal power, solar power, wind power and nuclear power. The two largest power development projects in the country are the 183 megawatt Isimba Hydroelectric Power Station, expected online in 2016, and the 600 megawatt Karuma Hydroelectric Power Station, expected online in 2018. According to a 2012 published report, Uganda was considering the use of nuclear energy for electricity generation.

== Subministries ==
- State Minister for Mineral Development, currently Hon. Peter Lokeris
- State Minister for Energy, currently Hon.Sidronius Okaasai Opolot

== Upcoming projects ==
It is expected that after Isimba and Karuma come on-line, construction of Ayago Power Station will begin. Uganda is increasingly developing other energy sources besides hydroelectricity, including evaluation of nuclear energy. The energy generated is expected to be used internally through the expansion of electricity access in Uganda from estimated 20 percent in 2016 (about 900,000 subscribers) to 40 percent in 2020 (about 3 million subscribers). Any surplus energy is expected to be sold to neighboring countries including South Sudan and DR Congo.

== List of ministers ==
- Ruth Nankabirwa (8 June 2021 - present)
- Mary Goretti Kitutu (14 December 2019 - 8 June 2021)
- Irene Muloni (27 May 2011 - 14 December 2019)
- Hilary Onek (16 February 2009 - 27 May 2011)
- Daudi Migereko (1 June 2006 - 16 February 2009)
- Syda Bbumba (2002 - 1 June 2006)

== Auxiliary institutions and allied agencies ==
1. Electricity Regulatory Authority (Uganda)
2. Uganda Electricity Generation Company Limited
3. Uganda Electricity Transmission Company Limited
4. Uganda Electricity Distribution Company Limited
5. Umeme Limited
6. Rural Electrification Agency
7. Uganda Energy Credit Capitalisation Company
8. Petroleum Authority of Uganda
9. Uganda National Oil Company
10. Uganda Oil Refinery
11. Uganda Atomic Energy Council

== See also ==
- Energy in Uganda
- Government of Uganda
- Cabinet of Uganda
