= Josephine Wapakabulo =

Electrical engineer and business executive

- Born: 1976 (age 49–50); Tanzania
- Citizenship: Uganda, United Kingdom
- Education: Loughborough University (BEng in Electronic & Electrical Engineering) (MSc in Information Technology) (PhD in Information Science); INSEAD Business School (Global Executive MBA)
- Occupations: Electrical engineer & business executive
- Years active: 2000–present
- Title: Former chief executive officer Uganda National Oil Company, founder of TIG Africa

Josephine Wapakabulo is an electrical engineer and business executive. She served as the founding chief executive officer of Uganda National Oil Company (UNOC). She was appointed in June 2016, as the first person to serve in that position, and the first woman to ever be a founding CEO of a national oil company. She resigned as UNOC CEO, with effect from 13 August 2019, "to focus on her family and new opportunities".

== Early life and education ==
Wapakabulo was born in Arusha, Tanzania. She is the daughter of Angelina Wapakhabulo and the late James Wapakhabulo.

She studied at Loughborough University in the United Kingdom, as an electronic and electrical engineer, obtaining a BEng, an MSc and a PhD at the same university. She also holds an Executive MBA from INSEAD Business School in France.

== Career ==
From 2000 until 2002, Wapakabulo worked as a leadership trainee and community organizer in Coventry, United Kingdom. From 2002 to 2006, she worked as a research associate at LSC Group Consulting in Lichfield, United Kingdom. In 2006, she joined Rolls-Royce in Derby, United Kingdom, as a business process and information engineering specialist, serving in that capacity until 2011. From 2011 until 2014, she served as a quality executive and engineering chief of quality and continuous improvement at Rolls-Royce in Berlin, Germany.

Between 2014 and 2015, she served as the chief operating officer at the Walk Free Foundation in Perth, Australia. In 2015, she returned to her native Uganda and worked as a business consultant in Kampala until 2016. She was named CEO by the board of UNOC in June 2016.

She took up her appointment at Uganda National Oil Company on 1 August 2016, with over 16 years' experience in effective leadership, team building, project management and innovation in multinational companies, across multiple continents. She is the founder and current managing director of TIG AFRICA, chief future officer at The Whitaker Group, and advisory board member of the Bloomberg New Economy Forum.
