= East African Crude Oil Pipeline =

Pipeline from Uganda to Tanzanian coast

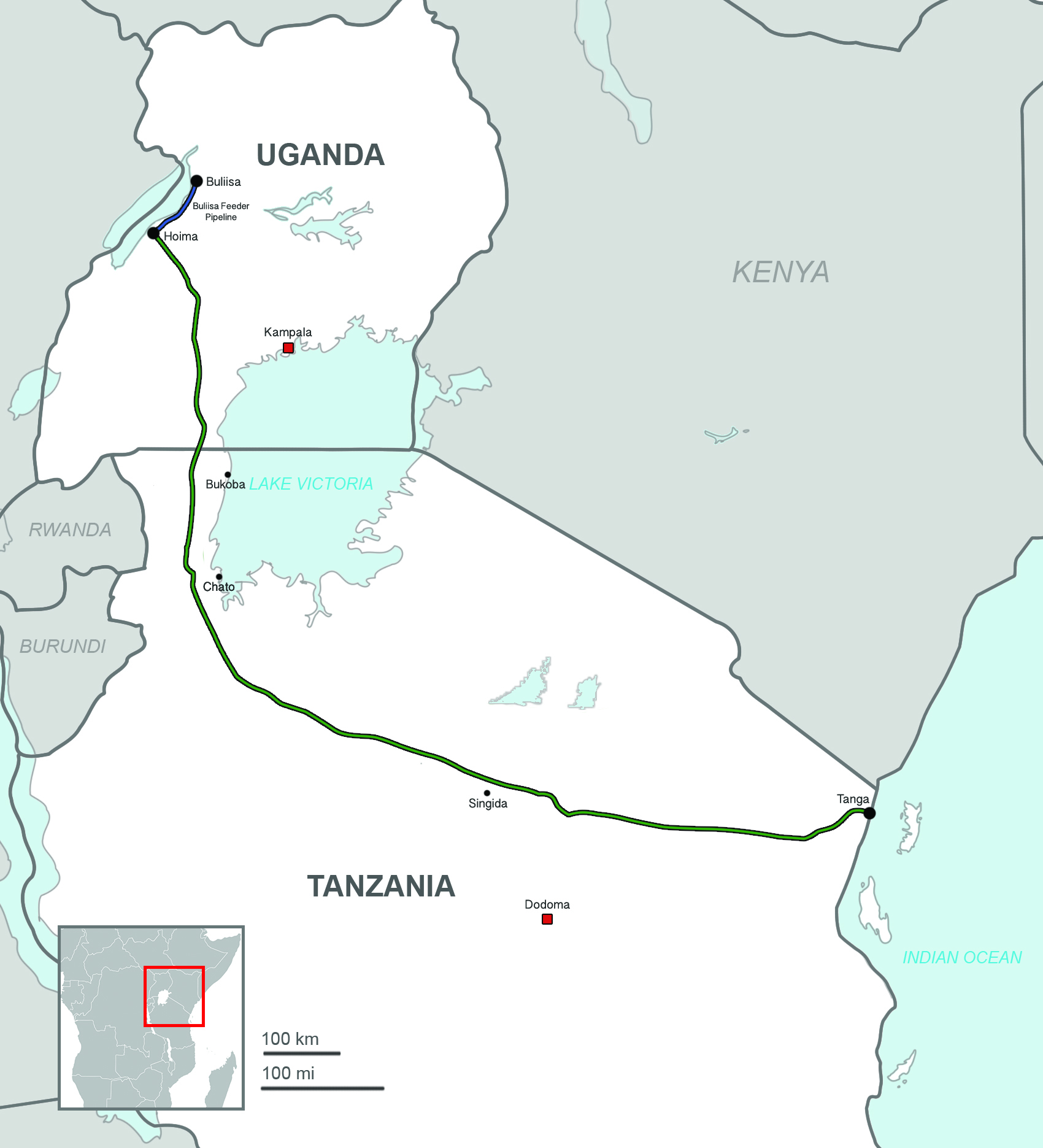
- Map of East African Crude Oil Pipeline

Location
- Country: Uganda and Tanzania
- Coordinates: 01°15′54″S 31°40′33″E
- Direction: West to southeast
- Start: Hoima, Uganda
- Passes through: Bukoba, Tanzania
- To: Tanga, Tanzania

General information
- Type: Crude oil pipeline
- Partners: TotalEnergies
- Commissioned: July 2026 (expected)

Technical information
- Length: 897 mi (1,444 km)
- Maximum discharge: 216,000 barrels per day
- Diameter: 24 in (610 mm)

The East African Crude Oil Pipeline (EACOP), also known as the Uganda–Tanzania Crude Oil Pipeline (UTCOP), is a 1,443 km crude oil pipeline in planning since 2013, under construction since 2017. As of December 2025, 79 percent of the construction work had been completed, with first exports expected for October 2026. It is majority owned by TotalEnergies at 62 percent, Uganda's National Oil Company (UNOC) at 15 percent, Tanzania Petroleum Development Corporation (TPDC) 15 percent and CNOOC at 8 percent. The pipeline is intended to export crude oil from Uganda's Tilenga and Kingfisher oil fields to the Port of Tanga, Tanzania on the Indian Ocean.

Uganda wants to develop its oilfields under the two projects Tilenga, operated by TotalEnergies, and Kingfisher, by China National Offshore Oil Corporation (CNOOC). The price of the project has increased to US$5 billion. Financing as of January 2024 remained uncertain, as 24 banks had distanced themselves from the project with only two banks namely South Africa's Standard Bank, through its subsidiary Stanbic Bank Uganda, and Sinosure still advising on the project. In March 2025, African Export-Import Bank and KCB Bank Uganda Limited joined the deal.

Once completed, the pipeline would be the longest electrically heated crude oil pipeline in the world. Because of the large scale displacement of communities and wildlife, the threat to water resources, and contribution to anthropogenic climate change, global environmental groups and the European Union have been protesting its construction and finance. Peaceful activism and protests in Uganda have been met with repression and arrests.

== Location ==
As of March 2016, the East African Crude Oil Pipeline (EACOP) was to start in Buseruka sub-county, Hoima District, at the Lake Albert (Africa) basin in Uganda's Western Region. It would travel along the Albertine Rift in a general south-easterly direction to pass through Rakai District in Uganda, Bukoba in Tanzania, loop around the southern shores of Lake Victoria, continue through Shinyanga and Singida, to end on the Chongoleani peninsula near the Port of Tanga, for export a distance of approximately 1,410 kilometres (880 mi).

In 2006, the Kingfisher oil field was discovered on the eastern bank of Lake Albert, the border between Uganda and the Democratic Republic of the Congo, spread over 344 square kilometres (133 mi^{2}) in the Albertine Rift basin in western Uganda. The Kingfisher project will be developed by China National Offshore Oil Corporation (CNOOC).

The Tilenga oil fields are located Northeast of the Kingfisher oilfield in the Buliisa and Nwoya districts. TotalEnergies has been planning to operate the Tilenga project (56.6 percent), in partnership with CNOOC and the Uganda National Oil Company (UNOC) by developing six fields, one of which is located inside Murchison Falls National Park and to drill roughly 400 wells at 31 locations. Buried pipelines would deliver the raw material to an oil treatment plant built in Kasenyi, to separate and treat the fluids.

== Overview ==
As of 2015, Uganda proven oil resources (oil in place) exceeded 6.5 billion barrels, of which about 2.2 billion barrels were recoverable.

In 2013, Uganda had agreed to build a joint Uganda–Kenya Crude Oil Pipeline to the Kenyan port of Lamu. In 2015, concerns regarding security and cost, however, motivated parallel negotiations with Tanzania regarding a shorter and safer route to Port of Tanga, with the support of TotalEnergies.

In April 2016, at the 13th Northern Corridor Heads of State Summit in Kampala, Uganda officially chose the Tanzania route for its crude oil, in preference to the Mombasa or Lamu routes through Kenya. The presidents of Kenya and Rwanda were present, along with representatives from Ethiopia, South Sudan, and Tanzania. At the same conference, President Uhuru Kenyatta announced that Kenya would build the Kenya Crude Oil Pipeline on its own, thereby abandoning the Uganda–Kenya Crude Oil Pipeline. As of August 2017, the pipeline was planned to have a capacity of 216,000 barrels of crude oil per day. to be 24 inches (61 cm) in diameter, and Uganda was to pay Tanzania US$12.20 for every barrel flowing through the pipeline.

In December 2021, the Ugandan parliament passed the East African Crude Oil Pipeline Special Provisions Bill into Ugandan law which governs the country's participation in the then estimated US$3.5 billion construction, operations and maintenance. Uganda's contribution was estimated at US$293 million, of which US$130 million had been paid in advance. A similar law had been passed by the Parliament of Tanzania, in August 2021.

== Cost and timetable ==
As of March 2016, construction was planned to start in August 2016 and expected to last three years at a cost of US$4 billion, providing approximately 15,000 construction jobs and 1,000 to 2,000 permanent jobs. In March 2016, the Daily Monitor newspaper reported that Total E&P was prepared to spend US$4 billion (UGX:13 trillion) to fund EACOP construction. In July 2016, following meetings between delegations led by the oil ministers of Tanzania and Uganda, held in Hoima, it was announced that construction of the 1,443 kilometres (897 mi) pipeline would begin in January 2017, and completion was planned for 2020.

As of August 2017, the construction budget for the 1,445 kilometres (898 mi) pipeline was US$3.5 billion.

In September 2020, TotalEnergies and the government of Uganda signed a host government agreement about Total's rights and obligations with respect to the development, construction, and operation of EACOP, at State House Entebbe with an expected final investment decision by the end of 2020. Two days later in September 2020, President Yoweri Museveni of Uganda and President John Pombe Magufuli of Tanzania signed an agreement in Chato, Tanzania to jointly construct the 1,445 kilometres (898 mi) East Africa Crude Oil Pipeline, at an estimated cost of US$3.5 billion. Work was scheduled to start by the end of 2020. Construction was expected to last about 36 months.

In October 2020, TotalEnergies and the government of Tanzania signed a host government agreement to govern their dealings regarding the EACOP, because 70 percent of the pipeline will pass through Tanzanian territory. Laying of the pipeline was anticipated to begin during the first quarter of 2021.

In April 2021, presidents Museveni of Uganda and Samia Suluhu of Tanzania met in Entebbe, Uganda with Patrick Pouyanné, the Chairman/CEO of TotalEnergies and Chen Zhuoubiao, President of CNOOC Uganda along with Ugandan and Tanzanian technocrats, lawyers and government ministers, to sign a number of agreements, allowing construction to begin. Construction was slated to begin in July 2021, with first oil anticipated in 2025.

In August 2021, the project cost had risen to US$5 billion, of which $2 billion were to be raised by the owners of the pipeline as equity investment and the remaining $3 billion were to be borrowed from external sources.

As of September 2024, as reported by The Citizen, 47 percent of the pipeline had been laid, with completion scheduled for July 2026. As of March 2025, more than 50 percent of the pipeline had been built. The project employs over 8,000 Tanzanians and Ugandans.

=== Ownership ===
In August 2017, the plan was to raise 70 percent of $3.5 billion financing capital needed from international lenders and 30 percent through Total, the Anglo-Irish Tullow and China National Offshore Oil Corporation (CNOOC), the Tanzania Petroleum Development Corporation and Uganda National Oil Company; the final investment decision was expected at the end of 2017. Uganda and Tanzania were advised by Standard Bank of South Africa, while Total SA was advised by Sumitomo Mitsui Banking Corporation. The London-based firm law firm Clifford Chance was advising TotalEnergies on legal matters, while CNOOC was advised by the Imperial Bank of China.

In March 2019, Uganda's National Oil Company took 15 percent shares in EACOP, Tanzania 5 per cent, Tullow shares 10 per cent, Chinese CNOOC 35 percent and Total 35 percent.

In April 2020, Tullow Oil Plc sold its "entire interests in Uganda's Lake Albert development project, including the East African Crude Oil Pipeline", to TotalEnergies for US$575 million with all tax liabilities. That ownership changed in April 2021, at the signing of the definitive investment agreements.

East African Crude Oil Pipeline stock ownership over time
Rank	Name of owner	Ownership in 2019 (%)	Ownership in 2020 (%)	Ownership in 2021 (%)	Notes
1	TotalEnergies	35	45	62	
2	China National Offshore Oil Corporation	35	35	8	
3	Uganda National Pipeline Company	15	15	15	
4	Tanzania Petroleum Development Corporation	5	5	15	
5	Tullow Oil Plc	10	0	0	
	Total	100	100	100	

In February 2022, Museveni and the Vice President of Tanzania Philip Mpango, the Executive Chairman/CEO of TotalEnergies, Patrick Pouyanné, the president of CNOOC Uganda Limited, Chen Zhuobiao; Ugandan cabinet ministers, oil technocrats from Uganda and Tanzania and other invited guests gathered at Kololo in Kampala, to witness the signing of the final investment decision by TotalEnergies and CNOOC. Other related parties to the EACOP included the Uganda National Oil Company, Petroleum Authority of Uganda, TotalEnergies Uganda and Tanzania Petroleum Development Corporation.

=== Funding ===
In May 2023, Sumitomo Mitsui Financial Group said it was not financing the pipeline, as was Standard Chartered, joining 24 banks who have distanced themselves from the project. As of June 2023, only two banks, the South African Standard Bank, through its subsidiary Stanbic Uganda, and the Industrial and Commercial Bank of China, were financial advisors to the project. In August 2023, it was reported that US$3 billion in loans were expected from Export–Import Bank of China, Islamic Development Bank and Afrexim Bank, while the pipeline shareholders would provide about US$2 billion. In January 2024 it was reported that Sinosure would only announce its final decision by June 2024.

In June 2024, the Standard Bank Group announced that they had decided to fund the pipeline. In March 2025, EACOP Limited, the company that owns and is building the pipeline announced that it had closed on the first tranche of international funding from a consortium comprising Afrexim Bank, Standard Bank of South Africa, Stanbic Bank Uganda Limited, KCB Bank Uganda Limited and the Islamic Corporation for the Development of the Private Sector (ICD), a division of the Islamic Development Bank. As of May 2025 it was reported that only South Africa's Standard Bank, through its subsidiary Stanbic Bank Uganda, African Export-Import Bank and KCB Bank Uganda Limited were financing.

== Construction ==
In 2017, Museveni laid the foundation stone, and the press reported that construction had begun.

In July 2022, the engineering, procurement and construction (EPC) contract was awarded to a joint venture comprising the Australian Worley Limited (formerly Worley Parsons Limited) and China Petroleum Pipeline Engineering. Construction was expected to begin in the first half of 2023 at an estimated cost of between US$3–4 billion with first oil expected in 2025.

In August 2023 the Daily Monitor reported that construction would start in the first quarter of 2024 with Bollore Logistics of France being a sub-contractor, responsible for transport, storage, handling and construction management of construction hardware.

In November 2023, The Independent Uganda reported that the first 100 kilometres (62 mi) of pipe was ready for shipment from the factory in China to Tanzania. At that time construction was expected to start in Q1 2024 and conclude in Q4 2025.

In April 2026, The Independent Uganda reported that all the pipes required for pipepeline construction had been delivered to sites in Uganda and Tanzania. The pipeline has three construction zones, one in Uganda and two in Tanzania. Construction Zone One stretches from Buliisa to Mutukula. Zone Two covers Mtukula to Singida and Zone Three runs from Singida to the port of Tanga in Tanzania. With first oil expected in H2 2026, oil will flow before the Uganda Oil Refinery is built.

== Pipeline insurance ==
In August 2022, Ugandan online media reported that licensing, registration and shareholding paperwork had been submitted, received and approved by the Insurance Regulatory Authority of Uganda for the Insurance Consortium for Oil and Gas Uganda (ICOGU) to insure the EACOP.

In February 2023, Ugandan, Tanzanian and US organisations filed a complaint against the US insurance broker Marsh with the OECD about violating "the guidelines governing the actions of multinational corporations with regard to respect for human rights and the environment".

== Oil refinery ==
As of 2013, the country had planned to build a refinery in the Western Region to meet local and regional demand, and to export the rest via pipeline to the Indian Ocean coast.

The US$2.5 billion project was to be developed under a public-private partnership, with 50 percent of the project owned by a private developer and 10 percent owned by Jk Minerals Africa of South Africa, the remaining 40 percent to be distributed among the East African countries. In April 2016, Tanzania agreed to buy 8 percent of the shares in the refinery for US$150.4 million.

== Social and environmental impact ==
According to a report by the Climate Accountability Institute, EACOP is expected to emit 379 million tonnes of CO_{2} during 25 years of operation, during peak crude oil flow, in years three through six, the attributed emissions total 34.8 million tonnes per year. However the construction and operation of the pipeline only accounts for 1.8% of the estimate, with 87.22% of estimated emissions coming from eventual product use of the oil and not from the pipeline itself. The estimated total over the 25 year period exceeds France's national emissions in 2020 at 277 million tonnes, and is slightly less than Australia's at 392 million tonnes. It carries significant global impacts by contributing to global warming.

The pipeline poses high risks of freshwater pollution and degradation, particularly to the Lake Victoria basin, where 400 kilometres of the pipeline will be laid. Once built, EACOP will cause irreversible damage to biodiversity, natural habitats and water sources.

As of July 2023, it is projected that the project will displace 100,000 people in Uganda and Tanzania and put key wildlife habitat and coastal waters at risk. As of 2020, civil society organizations have petitioned funding agencies not to support the project, citing potential social and environmental harm that the pipeline will cause. According to an Environmental Impact Assessment and social impact assessment from 2019 commissioned by Oxfam, the pipeline will disproportionately and negatively impact women including loss of income because of displacement, loss of land, loss of power in the household if men earn cash wages, increase in sex work as well as more unpaid care work.

The #StopEACOP campaign is a global campaign against the construction of the pipeline. Campaigners argue that, as the world's longest heated oil pipeline which will run through many populated areas, it will contribute to poor social outcomes for those displaced. They also mention the significant risk to nature and biodiversity, as the pipeline runs through large areas of savannah, zones of high biodiversity value, mangroves, coastal waters, and protected areas, before arriving at the coast where an oil spill could be dire. Spills are deemed more likely given the route through areas with seismic activity. Critics of the project point to the negative hydrological impact on the surface and groundwater resources of Lake Turkana and also to the fact that the pipeline will add another major source of oil to global markets and thereby contribute to anthropogenic climate change.

== Repression against critics and protesters in Uganda ==
Critics of the project in Uganda have been met with intimidation, shutdown of their organization (Africa Institute for Energy Governance) and arrests as early as October 2021.

In September 2022, the European Parliament passed a resolution condemning the EACOP project, calling for "the end of the extractive activities in protected and sensitive ecosystems, including the shores of Lake Albert". Afterwards, 9 Ugandan students who demonstrated in support of this EU resolution were arrested.

In October 2023, the Guardian reported about four dozen students attempting to deliver a petition to parliament who were beaten and four of them arrested. In spite of all these reports, TotalEnergies has stated it is "unaware of any allegations by human rights and environmental defenders of threats or retaliation".

In April 2025, 11 activists handing a petition to the office of Kenya's largest bank, KCB Uganda Limited in Kampala to withdraw their support of EACOP were arrested and taken to Luzira Maximum Security Prison. As refining is to occur overseas EACOP has been called "an example of typical neo-colonial extraction". Likewise 9 students who delivered a similar petition to Stanbic Bank were arrested.

== See also ==
- Petroleum Authority of Uganda
- Kenya–Uganda–Rwanda Petroleum Products Pipeline
- Hoima–Kampala Petroleum Products Pipeline
- Tanzania-Uganda Natural Gas Pipeline
