= Petroleum Geoscience =

Petroleum Geoscience is a quarterly peer-reviewed scientific journal published by the Geological Society of London and the European Association of Geoscientists and Engineers. It covers research in geoscience and technology associated with petroleum and reservoir engineering. According to the Journal Citation Reports, the journal has a 2011 impact factor of 1.161.
