= Petroleum Authority of Uganda =

Ugandan government oil regulatory parastatal

Coordinates: 00°03′15″N 32°28′52″E

Petroleum Authority of Uganda (PAU)
- Type: Government Agency
- Industry: Petroleum
- Founded: 2014
- Headquarters: 34-36 Lugard Avenue, Entebbe, Uganda
- Key people: Lynda Biribonwa; Chairperson; Ernest Rubondo; Executive Director
- Products: Exploration licences, refining licences, transportation licences, marketing licences, investment advice
- Number of employees: 37+ (2017)
- Website: Homepage

The Petroleum Authority of Uganda (PAU), also known as the Uganda National Petroleum Authority, is governmental organisation that regulates the petroleum industry in Uganda, an African country and member of the East African Community. Its responsibilities include licensing, regulation, supervision of exploration, harvesting, refining, marketing, and disposal of petroleum products in the country. Although owned by the Ugandan government, it is expected to act independently.

== Overview ==
The law authorising the creation of PAU is known as the Petroleum (Exploration, Development and Production) Act 2013. It was passed by the Ugandan parliament on 7 December 2012 and was assented to by the president of Uganda on 12 March 2013. The law was gazetted on 15 April 2013. PAU was established once the president named its board of directors and once Uganda's parliament approved the board members. In August 2017, PAU advertised 37 mainly managerial positions, in preparation for first oil, at that time expected in 2020.

== Location ==
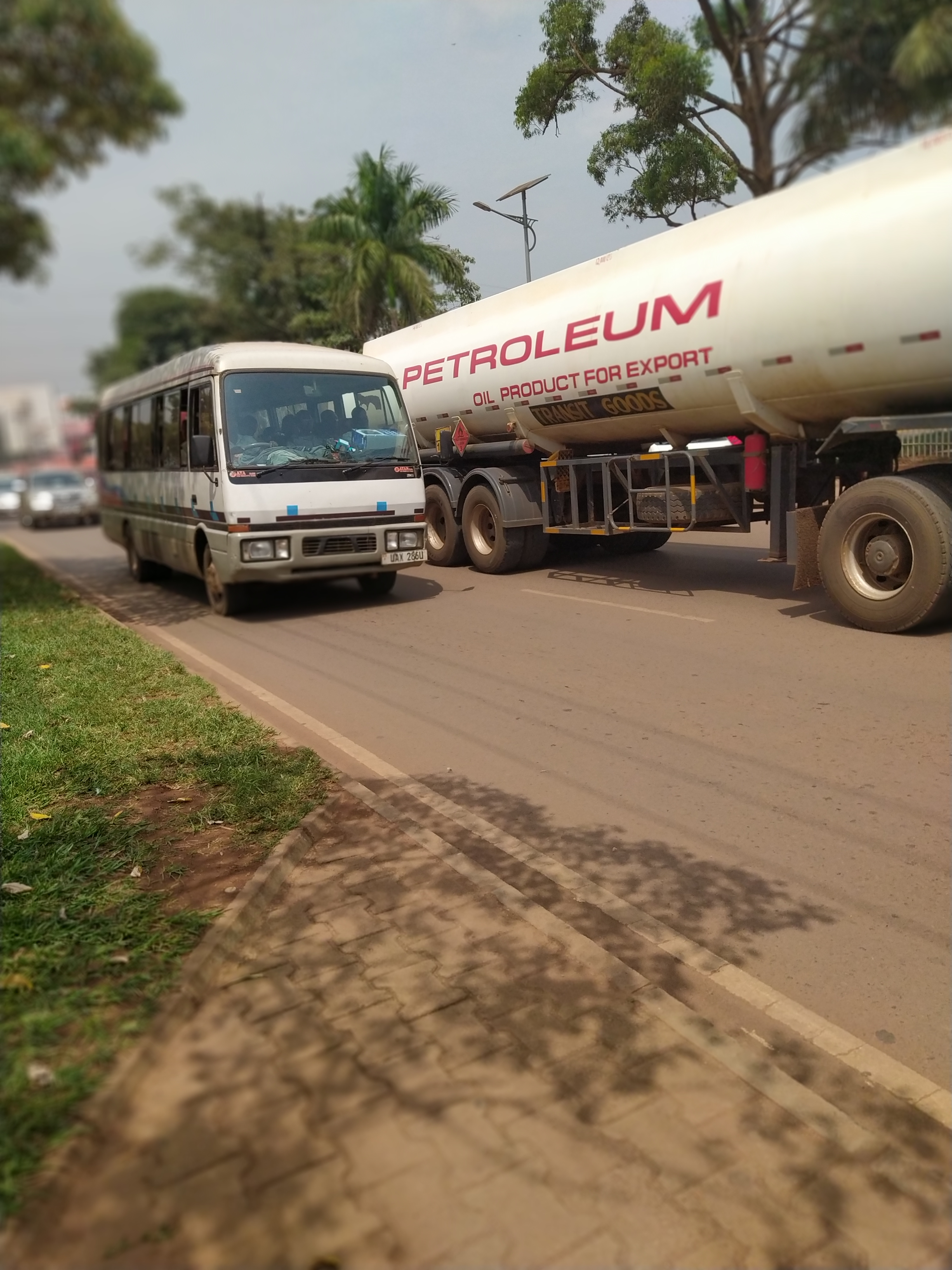
Petroleum truck on the road

The headquarters of PAU is at 34-36 Lugard Avenue, in Entebbe, on the northern shores of Lake Victoria. The coordinates of the headquarters of the authority are:0°03'15.0"N, 32°28'52.0"E (Latitude:0.054167; Longitude:32.481111).

== Governance ==
The chairperson of the board was Jane Mulemwa, a Ugandan chemist and academic. Other members of the board are Bernard Ongodia, Kevin Aanyu, Noble Banadda, Lynda Biribonwa, Doreen Kabasindi Wandera and Kiryowa Kiwanuka. In June 2016, Ernest Rubondo was appointed as the executive director and chief executive officer of PAU. Having served the prescribed four years, the first board was disbanded and a new board was appointed and sworn in, in 2020.

In 2024, a new board was appointed by the head of state and vetted by parliament. The composition of that board as of 19 July 2024, is as illustrated in the table below.

Board of Directors of Uganda Petroleum Authority 2024 - 2028
Rank	Director	Position	Specialty	Notes
1	Lynda Biribonwa	Chairperson	Environmental Manager	
2	Bernard Ongodia	Member	Principal of Uganda Petroleum Institute Kigumba	
3	Innocent Kihika	Member	Lawyer	
4	Adrian Mulindwa Bukenya	Member	Country Director, Mastercard Foundation	
5	Solome Galiwango	Member	Renewable Energy Specialist	
6	Mary Oduka Ochan	Member	Finance Specialist	
7	Vincent Bagire	Member	Economics Professor, Makerere University Business School	
Total	7			

== Other considerations ==
In January 2019, the Cabinet of Uganda made a decision "to formally join the Extractive Industries Transparency Initiative (EITI) as a member state". According to the government spokesperson, the decision was intended "to enhance the revenue collection process, boost finances and minimize mismanagement of oil and gas revenue".

== See also ==
- Uganda Oil Refinery
- Economy of Uganda
- Uganda National Oil Company
- Uganda–Kenya Crude Oil Pipeline
- Kenya-Uganda-Rwanda Petroleum Products Pipeline
- Energy Regulators Association of East Africa
