= Tanzania Petroleum Development Corporation =

National petroleum corporation of Tanzania

- Type: Parastatal
- Industry: Petroleum and Natural gas
- Founded: 30 May 1969
- Headquarters: Dar es Salaam, Tanzania
- Key people: Mussa M. Makame (MD)
- Owner: Tanzanian Government (100%)
- Number of employees: 400
- Subsidiaries: Tanoil; Gasco
- Website: tpdc.co.tz

The Tanzania Petroleum Development Corporation (TPDC; Swahili: Shirika la Maendeleo ya Petroli Tanzania) is the national oil company of Tanzania and owner of all licenses for energy development in the country. The company was established through the Government Notice No.140 of 30 May 1969 under the Public Corporations Act No.17 of 1969. The Corporation began operations in 1973. It is a wholly owned Government parastatal, with all its shares held by the Treasurer Registrar. In the summer of 2015, the Parliament of Tanzania passed three legislative Acts dealing with energy and directly impacting the company: the Petroleum Act 2015, the Tanzania Extractive Industry (Transparency and Accountability) Act 2015, and the Oil and Gas Revenues Management Act 2015.

According to The Economist, "Estimates put the country’s reserves at a little over 50 trillion cubic feet of gas, a figure the government thinks may double as additional exploration wells are drilled, making them potentially a considerable potential source of revenue."
