= Uganda National Oil Company =

National oil company of Uganda

Coordinates: 00°19′42″N 32°34′57″E

- Type: Parastatal
- Industry: Petroleum industry
- Founded: 2014; 12 years ago
- Headquarters: 15 Yusuf Lule Road, Nakasero, Kampala, Uganda
- Area served: Uganda
- Key people: Mathias Katamba (Chairman); Proscovia Nabbanja (CEO)
- Products: Petroleum; Oil; Gas
- Website: unoc.co.ug

The Uganda National Oil Company (UNOC), also known as the National Oil Company of Uganda, is a limited liability petroleum company in Uganda owned by the Ugandan government. The 2013 Petroleum (Exploration, Development and Production) Act of Uganda provides for the establishment of the national oil company. UNOC's board of directors was inaugurated on 23 October 2015 by the president of Uganda.

== Location ==
The headquarters of UNOC are located in Fairway Tower, at 15 Yusuf Lule Road, on Nakasero Hill, in Kampala, Uganda's capital and largest city. The coordinates of UNOC headquarters are 0°19'42.0"N, 32°34'57.0"E (Latitude:0.328333; Longitude:32.582500).

== Overview ==
The goal of the government of Uganda (GOU), as set out in the country's energy policy (2002) and National Oil and Gas policy (2008), is to ensure the sustainable utilization of discovered petroleum resources to contribute to early achievement of poverty eradication and create lasting value to society. One of the key objectives is to ensure an adequate, reliable, and affordable supply of quality petroleum products in the country. The petroleum deposits discovered so far are estimated at 6.5 billion barrels, of which 1.4 billion barrels are considered recoverable.

The state can participate with between 15 and 20 percent in production, according to existing production-sharing agreements between the state and the three oil exploration companies: Tullow Oil of the United Kingdom, TotalEnergies of France, and the China National Offshore Oil Corporation. It is the National Oil Company that will participate in production on behalf of the state. The Uganda Oil Refinery that is in the development phase calls for 40 percent participation by the state. The national oil company will invest in the refinery on behalf of the state. It is also expected that the new oil company will maintain a petroleum products retail network.

=== Financing ===
Plans were underway to develop a 60,000 barrel per day refinery to serve Uganda and its immediate neighbours. The refinery is being developed on a private-public partnership basis (60 percent to 40 percent). GOU is in the process of finalising the selection process of a strategic investor who will take up the private shareholding. The refinery is expected to boost the security of supply of petroleum products and provide an outlet for the discovered resources.

In February 2022, Proscovia Nabbanja, the chief executive of the Uganda National Oil Company, said the project promised a tenfold return on every dollar invested.

In July 2022, the ownership in Uganda's crude oil production facilities the Albertine Graben was as illustrated in the table below. This excludes ownership in the East African Crude Oil Pipeline and the Uganda Oil Refinery.

Shareholding In Uganda's Upstream Oil Facilities
Rank	Shareholder	Domicile	Percentage	Notes
1	TotalEnergies	France	56.67	
2	CNOOC Group	China	28.33	
3	Government of Uganda	Uganda	15.00	
	Total		100.00	

== Subsidiaries ==
UNOC has two wholly owned subsidiaries: the Uganda Refinery Holding Company headed by General Manager Michael Nkambo Mugerwa, and the Uganda National Pipeline Company headed by General Manager John Bosco Habumugisha.

In May 2017, UNOC began managing the Jinja Petroleum Storage Terminal (JPST), which has a storage capacity of 30,000,000 litres (6,599,077 imp gal; 7,925,162 US gal). JPST is joint venture between UNOC and a private company, One Petroleum Limited. The facility had 15,000,000 litres (3,299,539 imp gal; 3,962,581 US gal) in storage as of November 2017.

In December 2018, the shareholders of UNOC resolved that the company will own 15 percent equity in East African Crude Oil Export Pipeline (EACOP), up to 40 percent equity in the Uganda Oil Refinery and at least 51 percent equity in the Kampala Fuel Storage Facility (KFSF) to be located at Namwabula Village in Mpigi District. UNOC is expected to operate and manage the KFSF.

== Governance ==
The founding board was chaired by Emmanuel Katongole, an economist and businessman. He is a co-founder of Quality Chemical Industries Limited, a pharmaceutical company in Eastern Africa and the major supplier of anti-retroviral medications in Uganda. He was first appointed in August 2014 and was re-appointed for another five years on 12 November 2019.

The board members included Francis Nagimesi, a former chief executive officer of the defunct Coffee Marketing Board of Uganda; Francis Twinamatsiko, a principal economist in the Ugandan Ministry of Finance, Planning and Economic Development; Grace Tubwita Bagaya Bukenya, a physical planner; Pauline Irene Batebe, a chemical/refinery engineer in the Petroleum Directorate of Uganda; Godfrey Andama, a senior geoscientist; and Stella-Marie Biwaga, a lawyer working with FIDA, Uganda. In November 2019, Zulaika Mirembe Kasaija replaced Grace Tubwita Bagaya Bukenya on the board.

In March 2024, after the expiry of the second five-year term of the first board, a new board chaired by Mathias Katamba a retired banker was appointed and approved by parliament. Other members of the six-member board include Moses Kabanda from the Ministry of Finance, Herbert Mugizi, an engineer from the Ministry of Energy, Ivan Lule, a chemical engineer, Justine Isenyi from the office of the Vice President and Zulaika Kasajja Mirembe, an attorney.

In June 2016, Josephine Wapakhabulo, an electric and electronics engineer, was appointed managing director and chief executive officer of UNOC, being the first person to serve in that position. In August 2019 Wapakhabulo resigned. After serving in acting capacity for 45 days, Proscovia Nabbanja, a geologist, was confirmed as the substantive CEO, the second person to serve in that capacity.

== First oil ==
In March 2018, UNOC concluded the bidding for transporters to move 45,211 barrels of waxy test crude oil, equivalent to 1,898,862 US gallons (7,187,975 L; 1,581,133 imp gal) from the oilfields in Hoima District, to the Kenyan port of Mombasa. The winner of the tender was expected to be made public in April 2018. At prevailing crude oil prices of US$60 per barrel, the crude, extracted during testing and exploration was valued at about US$2.7 million (KSh271 million).

When the first bidding process failed to attract a credible buyer, the oil was re-advertised in June 2018. Failure to dispose of the crude oil before the Uganda oil refinery is completed, will make the refinery the default buyer. At the prevailing trading price of $74 (UShs280,000) per barrel of Brent crude oil, the 45,211 barrels could fetch about US$3.3m (about UShs 13 billion), as of June 2018.

In November 2019, the Daily Monitor newspaper reported that Uganda National Oil Company had secured a buyer for the test crude oil. The crude oil is stored in specialized containers at four sites; Kasemene 1, Ngara-1, Ngiri-2 in Buliisa District and at Tangi Camp in Nwoya District. At the prevailing price of WTI crude oil at US$55.06 (USh:202,048) per barrel, the 45,211 barrels could potentially yield US$2,489,318 (about USh9 billion), as of November 2019.

== Bulk petroleum products trading ==
In March 2020 UNOC signed a memorandum of understanding (MOU) with Stabex International Limited, an oil products distributor in the African Great Lakes Region. UNOC will import oil products in bulk and sell them to Stabex for onward distribution. Other distributors are being sought.

According to The EastAfrican, the MV Uhuru, a Kenyan vessel, owned by the Kenya Pipeline Corporation, transports bulk refined oil products (gasoline, diesel-fuel, kerosene and jet fuel) from Kisumu to Jinja Petroleum Storage Terminal and UNOC distributes them nationally and regionally.

Following the changes implemented in April 2023, in the way Kenya sources its refined petroleum products, from an "Open Tender System" (OTS) to a "Government to Government System" (G2GS), the government of Uganda enacted changes to mitigate inconveniences and financial losses that resulted from those changes.

In November 2023, Uganda disclosed that effective 1 January 2024, UNOC was to become the sole refined petroleum products importer in Uganda. UNOC would then distribute to oil marketing companies (OMCs) in the country. Under a five-year contract, the products will be supplied by Vitol Bahrain EC (VBEC), a member of the Vitol Group. The supplied products will solely be imported though the Port of Dar es Salaam, in Tanzania. VBEC will provide the necessary funding to start the process and will work with UNOC to build a new Kampala Storage Terminal (KST) storage space with capacity of 320,000,000 liters, at Namwabula in Mpigi District, near Buloba in Wakiso District.

== Developments ==
In Q2 2023, the Uganda government (GoU) requested the government of Kenya (GoK) for UNOC to use the Kenya Refined Oil Products Pipeline to transport the assets acquired from Vitol between Mombasa and Kisumu. The Kenya government turned down that request. The GoU then opened up discussions with the government of Tanzania (GoT) to get permission to use Tanzanian ports to import the petroleum products.

As of February 2024, the discussions between Tanzania and Uganda are ongoing with the two countries exploring the possibility of building a petroleum products pipeline between Port Tanga and Kampala. Meanwhile, there is a High Court injunction in Kenya, prohibiting the GoK from reconsidering their earlier decision. Uganda has also opened a lawsuit against Kenya in the East African Court of Justice claiming that denial of the use of the Kenya Petroleum Pipeline runs contrary to the spirit of the East African Community. Both cases await final determination. In a twist in the developments, Kenya has since approached Uganda to explore the construction of the "Eldoret-Malaba-Kampala-Kigali Petroleum Products Pipeline".

In March 2024, UNOC started selling petroleum products in small quantities, to oil marketing companies (OMCs) in Tanzania and Uganda, as the company tests out the supply chain and logistics involved. Once the details are sorted in the weeks and months ahead, UNOC is expected "to start directly importing from Vitol Bahrain under a five-year deal".

In March 2024, Uganda and Kenya resolved their petroleum dispute. The court cases in Kenya and Tanzania were both withdrawn. Kenya will issue an OMC licensee to UNOC, which will use Kenya Pipeline infrastructure to transport its petroleum assets between Mombasa and Kisumu.

The UNOC signed an agreement with Alpha MBM Investments for the development of a refinery at Kabaale in the Hoima District. The negotiations began on 16 January 2024 for the refinery that will have a capacity of 60,000 barrels of crude oil per day.

In March 2025, the UNOC acquired a 15% stake in the East African Crude Oil Pipeline (EACOP) which is being constructed and operated by the EACOP Ltd..

UNOC signed an Early Project Activities Agreement (EPAA) in July 2025 with VIVO Energy for Liquified Petroleum Gas (LPG) storage and distribution from the Kingfisher and Tilenga projects.

In 2026, the UNOC acquired a 20.15% stake into the Kenya Pipeline Company (KPC).

== See also ==
- Ruth Nankabirwa
- Irene Muloni
- Petroleum Authority of Uganda
- National Oil Corporation of Kenya
- Uganda–Kenya Crude Oil Pipeline
- East African Crude Oil Pipeline
- Oil companies in Uganda
