= Oil companies in Uganda =

There are several classes of oil companies in Uganda. One class is that of oil exploration companies. The second class is of oil marketing companies. And third class, is that of oil distribution companies. Some companies fall in more than one class. There are more companies in the space than are listed on this page.

== Oil exploration companies ==
1. Total E&P Uganda
2. China National Offshore Oil Corporation
3. Armour Energy Australia
4. Uganda National Oil Company

== Former oil exploration companies ==
1. Tullow Oil
2. Heritage Oil

== Oil marketing and distribution companies ==
1. Total M&S Uganda
2. Vivo Energy Uganda
3. Stabex International Limited
4. Ola Energy Uganda
5. Hass Petroleum Uganda Limited
6. Maestro Oil and Gas Solutions (MOGAS)
7. Hared Petroleum Company Limited
8. Rubis Energy Uganda Limited
9. Nile Energy Limited (Gaz)

== Other companies ==
- Uganda National Oil Company
- Uganda Refinery Holding Company
- Uganda National Pipeline Company
- Alpha MBM Investments
- J&H Internationals Group Uganda
- Albertine Graben Refinery Consortium
- EACOP

== Market share of petroleum products marketing companies in Uganda ==
As of February 2020, the market share among petroleum products marketing companies in Uganda was as illustrated in the table below.

Market Share of Petroleum Products Marketing Companies In Uganda As of February 2020
Rank	Oil Company	Percentage	Notes
1	Vivo Energy	22.7	
2	Total M&S Uganda	19.6	
3	Oryx, Kobil and Mogas	9.0	
4	Independent oil marketers	49.0	
	Total	100.0	

By April 2022, the market share among Ugandan oil marketing companies in the country had the composition illustrated in the table below.

Market Share of Petroleum Products Marketing Companies In Uganda As of April 2022
Rank	Oil Company	Percentage	Notes
1	Vivo Energy	16.86	
2	Total M&S Uganda	13.31	
3	Stabex Uganda Limited		
4	Rubis Uganda Limited		
5	Other Independent oil marketers		
	Total	100.00	

== See also ==
- Uganda Oil Refinery
- East African Crude Oil Pipeline
- Oil companies in Kenya
- Petroleum Authority of Uganda
- Kenya–Uganda–Rwanda Petroleum Products Pipeline
