= List of companies of Kenya =

Location of Kenya

Kenya is a country in East Africa and a founding member of the East African Community (EAC). Its capital and largest city is Nairobi. The capital, Nairobi, is a regional commercial hub. The economy of Kenya is the largest by GDP in East and Central Africa. Agriculture is a major employer; the country traditionally exports tea and coffee, and has more recently begun to export fresh flowers to Europe. The service industry is also a major economic driver. Kenya is a member of the East African Community trading bloc.

== Notable firms ==
This list includes notable companies with primary headquarters located in the country. The industry and sector follow the Industry Classification Benchmark taxonomy. Organizations which have ceased operations are included and noted as defunct.

Notable companies Status: P=Private, S=State; A=Active, D=Defunct
Name	Industry	Sector	Headquarters	Founded	Notes	Status	
98.4 Capital FM	Consumer services	Broadcasting & entertainment	Nairobi	1996	Radio	P	A
ABC Bank	Financials	Banks	Nairobi	1981	Commercial bank	P	A
ALS – Aircraft Leasing Services	Consumer services	Airlines	Nairobi	1985	Regional airline	P	A
ARM Cement Limited	Industrials	Building materials & fixtures	Athi River	1974	Cement, fertilizers, minerals, mining, KN: ARM	P	D
Bamburi Cement	Industrials	Building materials & fixtures	Nairobi	1951	Cement, KN: BAMB	P	A
Carbacid Investments	Basic materials	Commodity chemicals	Nairobi	1961	Carbon dioxide, KN: CARB	P	A
Chase Bank Kenya Limited	Financials	Banks	Nairobi	1996	Commercial bank	P	D
CIC Insurance Group	Financials	Full line insurance	Nairobi	1968	Insurance	P	A
CMC Aviation	Consumer services	Airlines	Nairobi	1961	Charter airline, defunct 2011	P	D
Commercial Bank of Africa	Financials	Banks	Nairobi	1962	Commercial bank	P	A
Consolidated Bank of Kenya	Financials	Banks	Nairobi	1989	Commercial bank	P	A
Cooper Motor Corporation	Consumer goods	Automobiles	Nairobi	1912	Automotive, KN: CMC	P	A
Cooperative Bank of Kenya	Financials	Banks	Nairobi	1965	Commercial bank, KN: COOP	P	A
Credit Bank	Financials	Banks	Nairobi	1986	Commercial bank	P	A
CRI Nairobi 91.9 FM	Consumer services	Broadcasting & entertainment	Nairobi	2006	Radio station	P	A
Davis & Shirtliff	Energy	Energy equipment	Nairobi	1946	Equipment supplier for water and energy	P	A
Dawa Limited	Healthcare	Pharmaceuticals	Nairobi	1974	Pharmaceutical company	P	A
Del Monte Kenya	Consumer goods	Food products	Thika	1965	Pineapple cultivation, part of Fresh Del Monte Produce (US)	P	A
Development Bank of Kenya	Financials	Banks	Nairobi	1963	Commercial bank	P	A
Diamond Trust Bank Group	Financials	Banks	Nairobi	1945	Banking group, KN: DTK	P	A
Dubai Bank Kenya	Financials	Banks	Nairobi	1982	Commercial bank, defunct 2015	P	D
East African Breweries	Consumer goods	Brewers	Nairobi	1922	Beer, KN: EABL	P	A
Equity Group Holdings Limited	Financials	Banks	Nairobi	1984	KN: EQTY	P	A
Eveready East Africa	Consumer goods	Nondurable household products	Nairobi	1967	Batteries, disposable shavers, KN: EVRD	P	A
Jubilee Insurance Company Limited	Financials	Full line insurance	Nairobi	1937	KN: JUB	P	A
Kakuzi Limited	Consumer goods	Food products	Thika	1906	Coffee, tea, fruit, KN: KUKZ	P	A
KCB Group Limited	Financials	Banks	Nairobi	1896	Banking, investments, KN: KCB	P	A
KenolKobil	Oil & gas	Exploration & production	Nairobi	1959	Petroleum, KN: KENO	P	A
Kenya Airways	Consumer services	Airlines	Nairobi	1977	Flag airline, KN: KQNA	P	A
Kenya Electricity Generating Company	Utilities	Conventional electricity	Nairobi	1954	Electricity generation, KN: KEGN	P	A
Kenya Railways Corporation	Industrials	Railroads	Nairobi	1977	National railways	S	A
Kenya Reinsurance Corporation	Financials	Full line insurance	Nairobi	1971	Reinsurance	S	A
KOKO Networks	Energy	Alternative energy	Nairobi	2014	Bioethanol fuels and cooking equipment	P	A
Mobius Motors	Consumer goods	Automobiles	Nairobi	2009	Automotive	P	A
Mumias Sugar Company Limited	Consumer goods	Food products	Nairobi	1971	Sugar estates and manufacture, KN: MSC	P	A
Nation Media Group	Consumer services	Broadcasting & entertainment	Nairobi	1959	Newspapers, magazines, radio, television, KN: NMG	P	A
National Oil Corporation of Kenya	Oil & gas	Exploration & production	Nairobi	1981	Petroleum	S	A
Naivas Limited	Consumer services	Food retailers & wholesalers	Nairobi	1990	Grocery	P	A
Olympia Capital Holdings	Industrials	Building materials & fixtures	Nairobi	1968	Flooring, building materials, KN: OCH	P	A
Postal Corporation of Kenya	Industrials	Delivery services	Nairobi	1999	Postal services	P	A
Rea Vipingo Sisal Estate	Consumer goods	Farming & fishing	Nairobi	1939	Plantations, KN: REA	P	A
Safaricom	Telecommunications	Mobile telecommunications	Nairobi	1997		P	A
Sameer Group	Industrials	Diversified industrials	Nairobi	1969	High tech, agribusiness, manufacturing, transport, KN: FIRE	P	A
Sasini Tea and Coffee	Consumer goods	Food products	Nairobi	1952	Tea, coffee, KN: SASN, part of Sameer Group	P	A
Serena Hotels	Consumer services	Travel & toruism	Nairobi	1970	Tourism promotion services, hotels, resorts, KN: TPSE	P	A
Telkom Kenya	Telecommunications	Fixed line telecommunications	Nairobi	1999	State telecom provider	S	A
Uchumi Supermarkets	Consumer services	Food retailers & wholesalers	Nairobi	1975	KN: UCHM	P	A
Unga Group	Consumer goods	Food products	Nairobi	1908	Flour milling, KN: UNGA	P	A
WPP-Scangroup	Consumer services	Broadcasting & entertainment	Nairobi	1996	Advertising, KN: SCAN	P	A

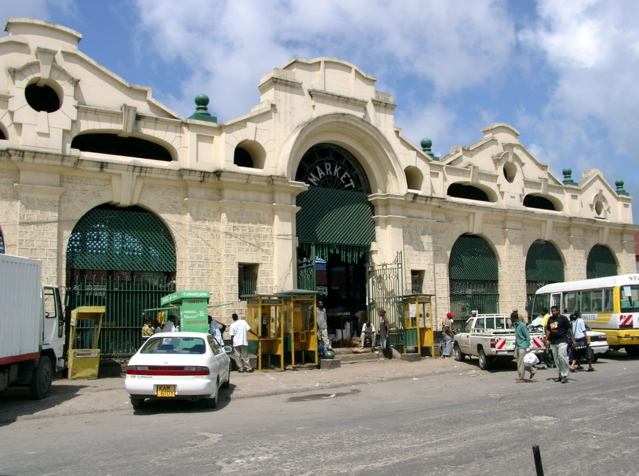
A market hall in Mombasa

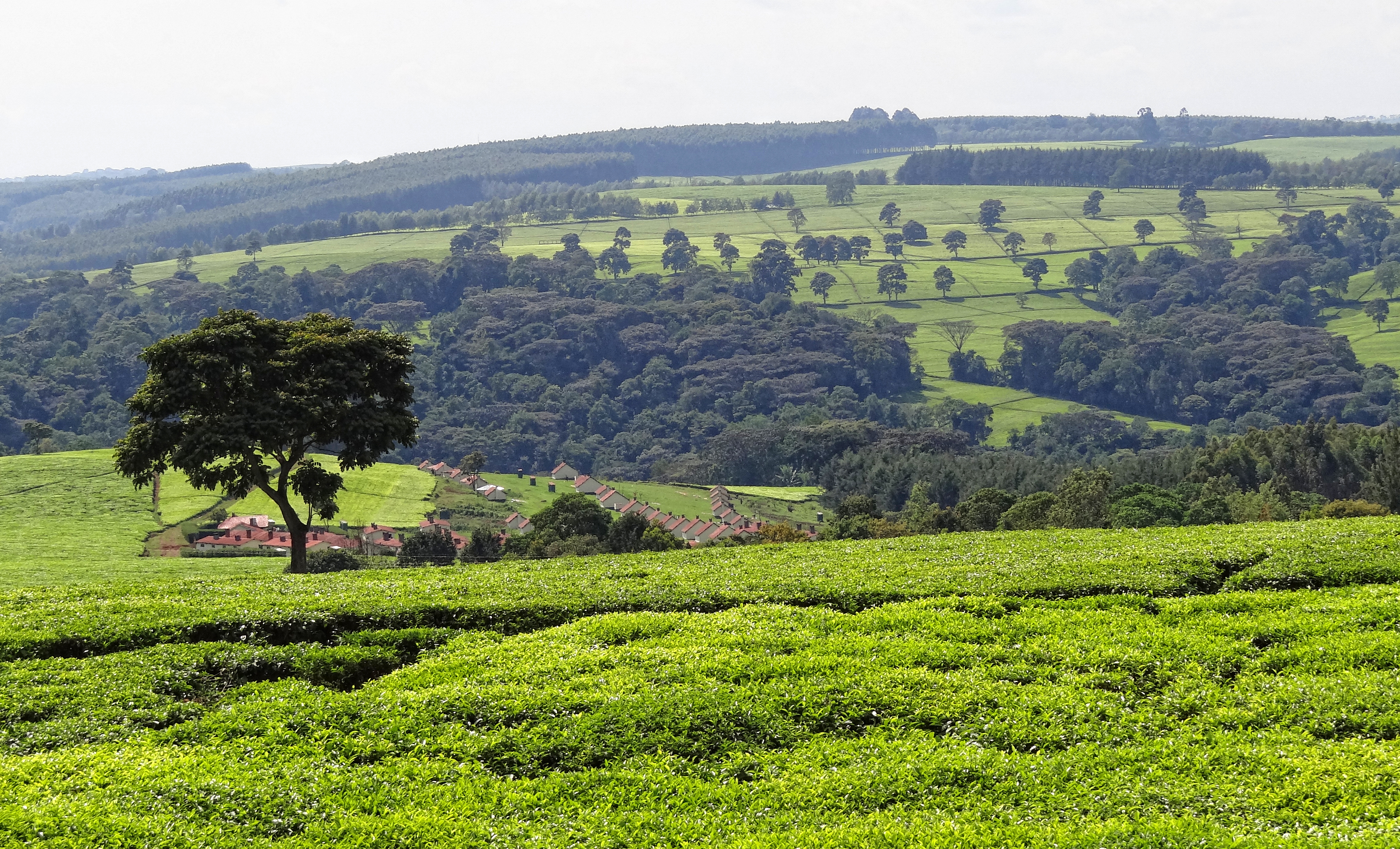
A tea farm near Kericho, Kericho County

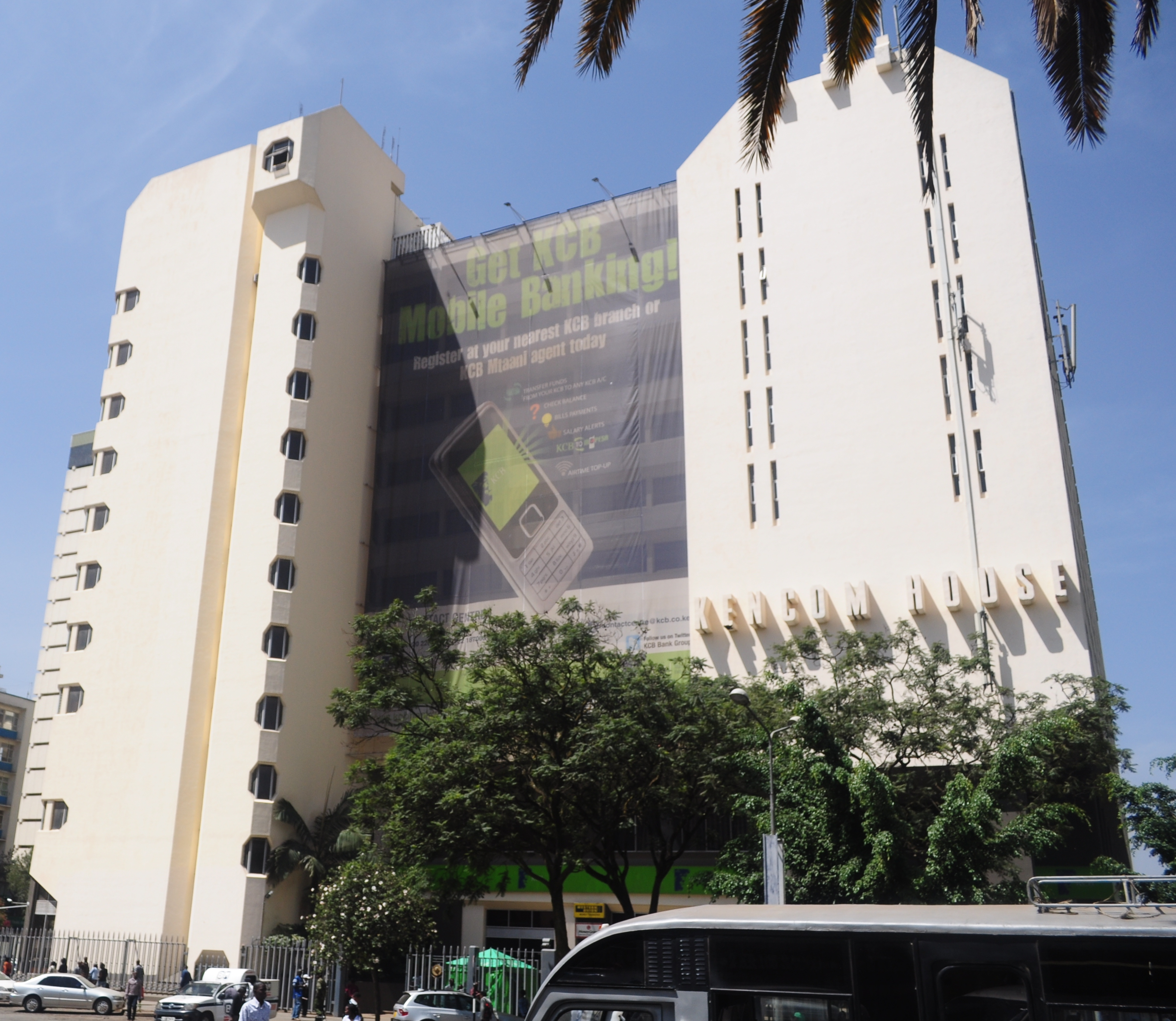
The Kenya Commercial Bank headquarters in Nairobi

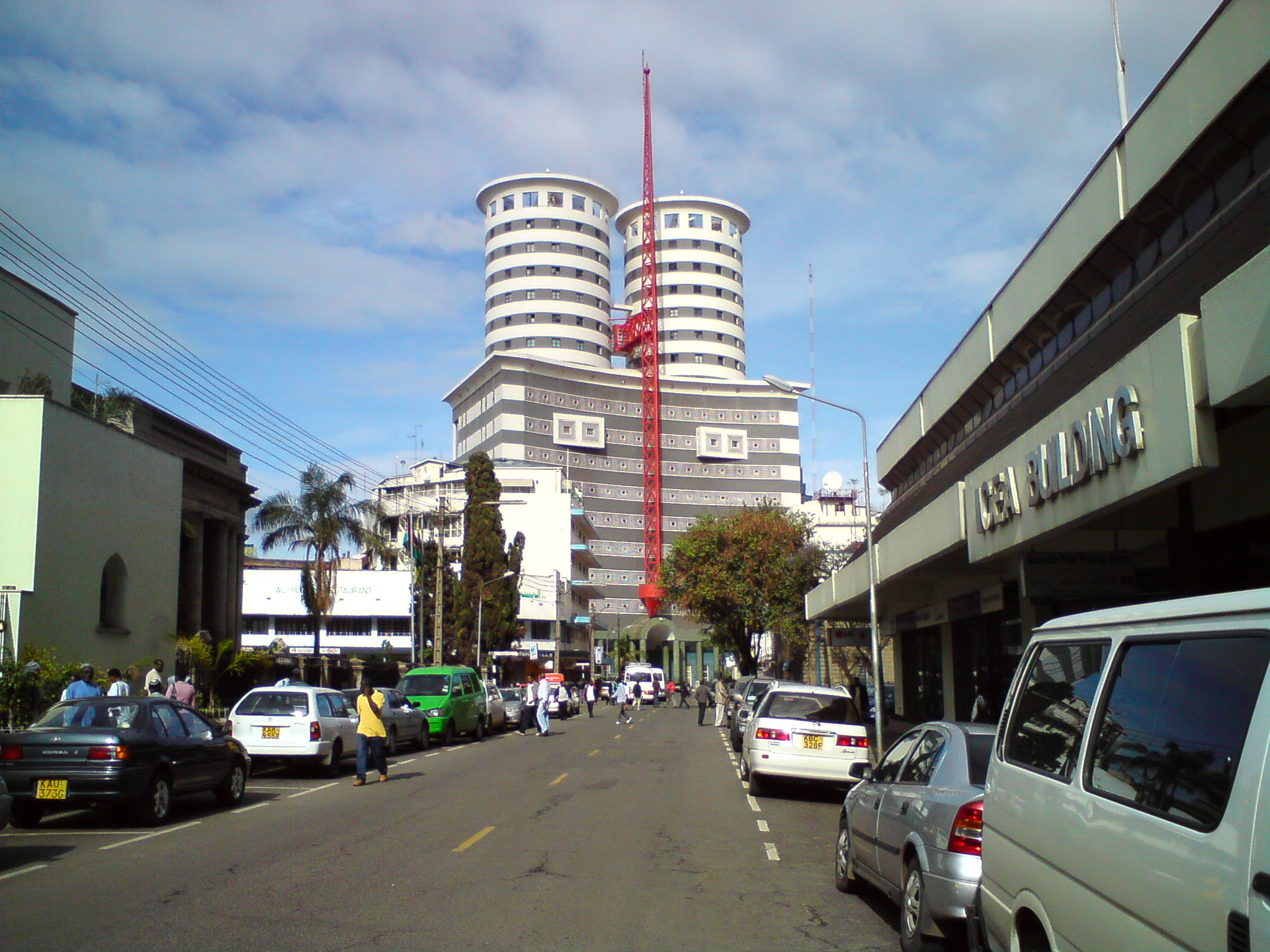
Headquarters of the Nation Media Group

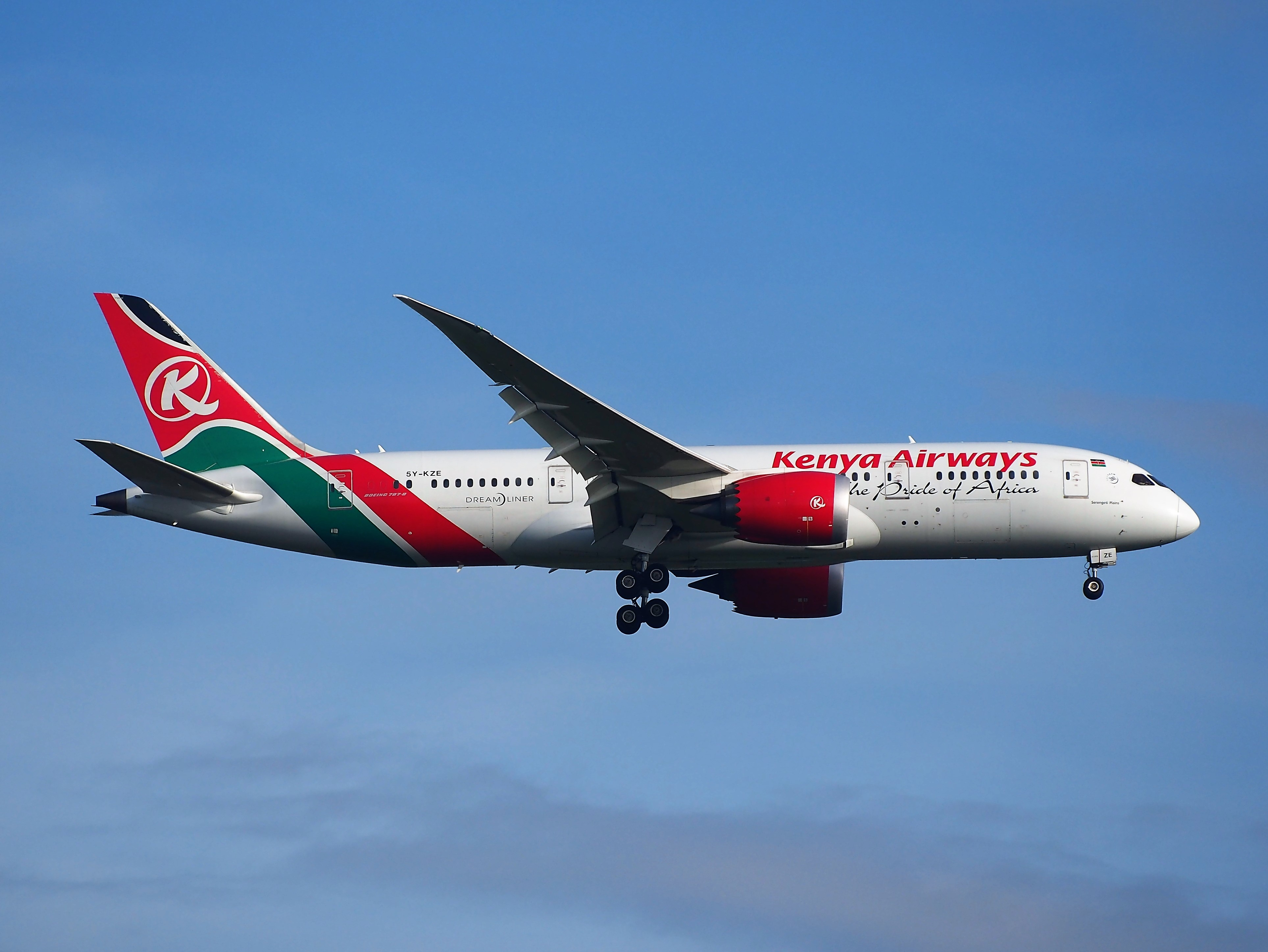
Kenya Airways Boeing 787-8 Dreamliner

== See also ==
- Nairobi Securities Exchange
- List of companies and organizations based in Nairobi
