= Petroleum industry in Kenya =

The petroleum industry in Kenya is relatively new in terms of mining and exploration. British firm Tullow Oil began operations in Kenya in 2010 after signing agreements with Africa Oil and Centric Energy, purchasing a 50% interest in five onshore licences. In 2012, the Ngamia-1 exploration well was a success and has since been followed by further exploration in the South Lokichar Basin. Drilling for oil at the Lokichar oil fields, Turkana county is expected to begin next year between January and February 2026

== History ==
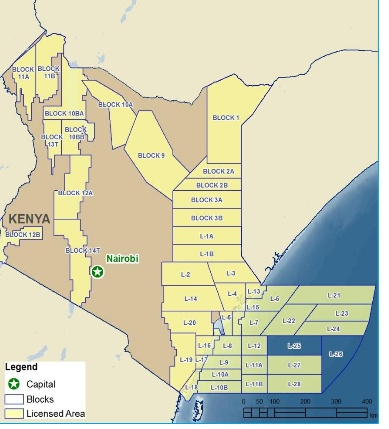
Oil Exploration Blocks in Kenya

The history of oil marketing in Kenya began in 1903, during colonial times. Initially, kerosene was the main import in tins, but later gasoline was imported in tins and drums. Royal Dutch Shell established the first depot on the Mombasa Island at Shimanzi.

According to Deloitte in 2013, Kenya has four prospective sedimentary basins: Anza, Lamu, Mandera, and the Tertiary Rift. The Lamu basin extends offshore.

Oil is regulated by the Energy Regulation Commission and the Ministry of Mining. Current traders include the National Oil Corporation of Kenya, Shell, Tullow Oil, KenolKobil, MOGAS, Hass, Hashi Energy, Gulf Energy, Olympic, Dalbit Petroleum, and Petrocam. In August, 2019, Kenya exported its first crude oil from the port of Mombasa. This was an experimental stage to test the country’s crude oil before full production and exportation, which was expected to begin in 2024. Tullow oil, which was the pioneer of oil extraction in Kenya, sold its assets to Gulf Energy in September 2025

== See also ==
- Oil companies in Kenya
- National Oil Corporation of Kenya
