= List of companies and organizations based in Nairobi =

Nairobi is the business and financial centre of Kenya. This is highlighted by the number of companies and organizations headquartered in the city.

== Companies headquartered in Nairobi ==
The following is a list of prominent companies and organizations with their main headquarters in Nairobi:

- East African Breweries
- Equity Group Holdings Limited
- Gulf African Bank
- KCB Group Limited
- Kenya Airports Authority
- Kenya Airways
- Kenya Commercial Bank Group
- Kenya Electricity Generating Company (KenGen)
- Mumias Sugar Company
- Nation Media Group
- National Oil Corporation of Kenya
- National Social Security Fund
- NIC Bank Group
- Sameer Group
- Serena Hotels
- Standard Group
  1. The Standard
  2. Kenya Television Network
- Unga Group
- United Nations
  1. United Nations Environment Programme
  2. United Nations Human Settlements Programme
- Safaricom
- WPP-Scangroup

== International companies with African headquarters in Nairobi ==
The following is a list of multinational companies and organizations, with their African (continent-wide or regional) headquarters in Nairobi:

| Organization | Office location in Nairobi | Region covered | Reference |
|---|---|---|---|
| (Taiwan) Asus | | East Africa | |
| (China) AVIC International | Westlands | Africa | |
| (Germany) BASF | Ruaraka | Sub-Saharan Africa | |
| Bank of China | Kilimani | East Africa | |
| (India) Bharti Airtel | | Africa | |
| (United States) United Nations | Gigiri | Africa | |
| (Canada) BlackBerry Ltd | | East Africa and Central Africa | |
| (Germany) Bosch | | East Africa | |
| (United States) Cisco Systems | Upper Hill | East Africa | |
| (United States) Chartis | Westlands | Africa | |
| China-Africa Development Fund | | East Africa | |
| China Central Television | Hurlingham | Africa | |
| China Daily | CBD | Africa | |
| China Radio International | Hurlingham | Africa | |
| (United States) Coca-Cola | Upper Hill | Africa | |
| (United Kingdom) Diageo | | Africa | |
| (Norway) Eltek | Upper Hill | Sub-Saharan Africa | |
| (United Arab Emirates) GEMS Education | Langata | Africa | |
| (United States) General Electric | Westlands | Africa | |
| (European Union) GSM Association | Upper Hill | Africa | |
| (Germany) Hapag-Lloyd | | East Africa | |
| (Netherlands) Heineken | High Ridge | East Africa and the Indian Ocean | |
| (United States) Hill International | | Sub Saharan Africa | |
| (China) Huawei | Upper Hill | East Africa | |
| (United States) IBM | | Africa | |
| (United Nations) ICAO | Gigiri | East Africa and Southern Africa | |
| (United States) IMF | Upper Hill | Africa | |
| (United States) Intel Corporation | Westlands | East Africa | |
| (United Kingdom) ITF | Westlands | Africa | |
| (Switzerland) IUCN | Mukoma | East Africa | |
| (Norway) Jotun | | East and Central Africa | |
| (Russia) Kaspersky Lab | | East Africa | |
| (United States) Kiva | | Africa | |
| (South Korea) LG | Westlands | East Africa and Indian Ocean | |
| (United States) MasterCard | | East Africa | |
| (Germany) Merck KGaA | | Africa | |
| (Japan) Mitsubishi Motors | | Africa | |
| (United States) Motorola Solutions | | Sub-Saharan Africa | |
| (Switzerland) Nestlé | | East Africa, Central Africa and West Africa | |
| (India) NIIT | | East Africa and Central Africa | |
| (Finland) Nokia | | East Africa | |
| (Finland) Nokia Research Hub | | Africa, India and the Middle East | |
| (Switzerland) Panalpina | | East Africa | |
| (United States) Pfizer | Industrial Area | East Africa | |
| (United States) Qualcomm | | Sub-Saharan Africa | |
| (United States) Rockefeller Foundation | Upper Hill | Africa | |
| (Switzerland) Red Cross | | | |
| (United States) RTI International | Westlands | Africa | |
| (United Kingdom) Sage Group | Westlands | East Africa | |
| (Sweden) Scania AB | | Africa | |
| (Japan) Sony | | East Africa and Central Africa | |
| (United Kingdom) Standard Chartered Bank | Westlands | Africa | |
| (Sweden) Stockholm Environment Institute | Gigiri | Africa | |
| (Netherlands) TNT | Upper Hill | East Africa and Central Africa | |
| (Japan) Toyota | Mombasa Road | Africa | |
| (United States) Visa Inc. | | Sub Saharan Africa | |
| (United States) World Bank | Upper Hill | Africa | |
| (China) Xinhua News Agency | Upper Hill | Africa | |

== See also ==
- Economy of Kenya
- List of companies of Kenya
