= Oil companies in Kenya =

As of October 2015, there were more than 60 registered oil companies in Kenya.

== History ==
The history of oil marketing in Kenya began in 1904 during colonial times. Initially, kerosene was the main import in tins but later gasoline was imported in tins and drums. Royal Dutch Shell established the first depot at Shimanzi, in Mombasa, in the early 1900s.

== Today ==
On 26 August 2019 President Uhuru Kenyatta of Kenya flagged off the first consignment of 200,000 barrels of crude oil for export as the Eastern Africa nation joins the league of petroleum exporting countries. The first consignment of Kenyan crude oil which left the Port of Mombasa for Britain, makes Kenya the first Eastern Africa country to become an oil exporting nation, said Kenyatta at a ceremony in the coastal city.

As of July 2018, there were over 60 registered oil companies in Kenya. The industry was controlled by major companies such as Libya Oil Kenya Limited, Vivo Energy Kenya Limited and TotalEnergies with competition from some locally established companies such as KenolKobil, Kenya National Oil Corporation, Tosha and Dalbit Petroleum. At that time, the shareholding among the oil marketing companies in Kenya, were as illustrated in the table below:

Market Sharing Among Oil Marketing Companies In Kenya Between January And March 2018
Rank	Name of Company	Market Share
1	Vivo Energy Kenya	28.0
2	Total Kenya Limited	23.1
3	KenolKobil	9.9
4	National Oil Corporation of Kenya	7.4
5	Ola Energy Kenya	7.2
6	Over 45 other companies	24.4
	Total	100.00

As of December 2023, the shareholding among the oil majors in Kenya was as illustrated in the table below:

Market Sharing Among Oil Marketing Companies In Kenya In April 2022
Rank	Name of Company	Market Share
1	Vivo Energy Kenya	22.07
2	Total Kenya Limited	14.88
3	Rubis Kenya Limited	14.05
4	Ola Energy Kenya	7.06
5	Over 45 other companies	41.94
	Total	100.00

== See also ==
- Energy in Kenya
- Petroleum industry in Kenya
