= Rubis Energy Kenya =

African downstream oil company

KenolKobil PLC
- Company type: Private
- Traded as: KN: KENO
- Industry: Oil and gas
- Founded: 13 May 1959; 67 years ago
- Founder: R S Alexander
- Headquarters: Nairobi, Kenya
- Area served: Africa
- Key people: NON
- Services: Fuel stations
- Revenue: ▼KES: 91.32 billion (2014)
- Net income: ▲KES: 1.09 billion (2014)
- Total assets: ▼KES: 15.49 billion (2014)
- Total equity: ▲KES: 7.33 billion (2014)
- Website: Homepage

KenolKobil Plc, is a pan African downstream oil company. The group's operations span seven countries across Eastern, Central and Southern Africa and encompass the supply, storage, distribution and retail of a wide range of petroleum products.

== Overview ==
Headquarters are in Nairobi, Kenya with subsidiaries in Burundi, Ethiopia, Kenya, Mozambique, Rwanda, Uganda and Zambia.

According to the Petroleum Institute of East Africa's report released in December 2014, KenolKobil was ranked third with 13.9 percent market share behind Total Kenya and Vivo Energy.

== History ==
KenolKobil, then Kenya Oil Company Limited (abbreviated Kenol), was founded on May 13, 1959, by R S Alexander as a Private limited company. The Company started its operations as a wholesaler of packaged Kerosene under the brand name "SAFI". The company later began investing in service stations. In September 1959, Kenya Oil Company listed its shares on the Nairobi Securities Exchange making it the first petroleum company to be quoted on the exchange.

In the early 1980s, Kenol faced numerous financial challenges and was placed under receivership. The company came out of receivership in 1983 and its shareholders resumed full control of the business. In 1986, Kenol and Kobil Petroleum Limited, a Delaware registered holding company that acquired Mobil Oil's assets in Kenya and Uganda in 1984, entered into a joint operations and management agreement. This agreement resulted in the sharing of distribution cost and managerial services thus enabling both companies to lower their operating costs and enhance profitability.

The year 1999 marked the beginning of regional expansion. That year, the group acquired a 100% stake of Galana Oil Uganda Limited and renamed it Kobil Uganda Limited. At the point of acquisition, Kobil Uganda owned 19 service stations. In 2001, Kenol expanded into Tanzania through the incorporation of Kobil Tanzania Limited as a wholly owed subsidiary. The group expanded further south in 2002 when it acquired 100% interest in Jovenna Zambia Limited and renamed it Kobil Zambia Limited.

The group expanded to Ethiopia in March 2005 when it incorporated Kobil Ethiopia. In February 2006, Kenol acquired Shell Rwanda SARL from Royal Dutch Shell and renamed it Kobil Rwanda. In 2007, the group acquired KLSS Rwanda's assets and merged them to Kobil Rwanda. In the same year, the group acquired the assets Shell Ethiopia and merged them to Kobil Ethiopia.

Kenol and Kobil joint operations and management agreement came to an end in 2007 when Kenol acquired 100% of the shares in Kobil Petroleum. This transaction involved allotting 45.5 million shares in exchange for 100% of the issued shares of Kobil. To reflect its status as a merged company, the group's name was changed from Kenya Oil Company Limited to KenolKobil.

In 2009, the group acquired Oil Burundi from Engen and rebranded it to Kobil Burundi SA. In 2011, the group resumed its expansion in the Southern African region through the incorporation of Kobil Zimbabwe in Zimbabwe and Kobil Mozambique in Mozambique. In the same year, the Group completed acquisition of a depot in Lubumbashi, in the Democratic Republic of Congo. The main purpose of Kobil Zimbabwe was to form a joint venture with Engen to acquire the whole operations of Shell and BP in Zimbabwe. The partners were not able to receive government approval due to the Indigenization Law in Zambabwe. Kobil Zimbabwe has since been a dormant company. 2011 also saw the group acquire 25.5% stake in Lublend Limited through Kobil Zambia.

In May 2012, KenolKobil received a US$800 million takeover bid from Puma Energy, a subsidiary of Swiss Based Trafigura. However Puma Energy later terminated its bid to acquire the group.

Company logo prior to 2019 acquisition

In 2019, Rubis completed its full acquisition of KenolKobil and the company rebranded to Rubis Energy Kenya.

== Member companies ==
The companies that comprise the KenolKobil Limited include, but are not limited, to the following:

- KenolKobil Limited – Nairobi Kenya – 100% Shareholding – The flagship company of the group. Importing, marketing and distributing petroleum products in Kenya.
- Kobil Petroleum – Delaware, USA – 100% Shareholding – Investment holding company.
- Kobil Uganda Limited – Kampala, Uganda – 100% Shareholding – Importing, marketing and distributing petroleum products in Uganda.
- Kobil Zambia Limited – Lusaka, Zambia – 100% Shareholding – Importing, marketing and distributing petroleum products in Zambia.
- Kobil Rwanda SARL – Kigali, Rwanda – 100% Shareholding – Importing, marketing and distributing petroleum products in Rwanda.
- Kobil Ethiopia Limited – Addis Ababa, Ethiopia – 100% Shareholding – Importing, marketing and distributing petroleum products in Ethiopia.
- Kobil Burundi SA – Bujumbura, Burundi – 100% Shareholding – Importing, marketing and distributing petroleum products in Zambia.
- Kobil Mozambique – Maputo, Mozambique – 100% Shareholding – Dormant company.
- Lublend Limited – Ndola, Zambia – 25.5% Shareholding – A Manufacture of petroleum lubricating oil and grease. Majority owned by Mobil Zambia Limited.

== Ownership ==
The shares of the stock of KenolKobil Limited are traded on the Nairobi Securities Exchange, under the symbol: KENO. At 3, December 2018 the shareholding in the group's stock was as depicted in the table below:

== KenolKobil Stock Ownership as at December 2018 ==
Rank	Name of Shareholder	Percentage Ownership
1	Rubis Énergie	23.7
2	Petro Holdings Limited	8.2
3	KenolKobil ESOP	5.8
4	Other investors	62.3
	Total	100.00

== Governance ==
KenolKobil is governed by a six-person board of directors and David Ohana as the group managing director.

== See also ==
- NSE
- Oil companies in Kenya
- Kenya Pipeline Company
- Petroleum industry in Kenya
- List of companies of Kenya
