= Crown Agents =

International development organisation

Crown Agents Ltd
- Company type: Private limited company
- Industry: International Development
- Founded: 1833. UK statutory public corporation, 1980–1997; 21 March 1997 (Ltd.)
- Headquarters: Southwark, London, England
- Area served: Worldwide
- Key people: James Cameron (Chair); Fergus Drake (CEO)
- Website: www.crownagents.com

Crown Agents Ltd is a not-for-profit international development company with head office in London, United Kingdom, and subsidiaries in the United States and Japan. Incorporated as a private limited company Crown Agents Ltd has only one shareholder – the Crown Agents Foundation, a not-for-profit company. Crown Agents Ltd's registered office is in Southwark, London. Crown Agents was placed into insolvency on the 1 August 2024.

== History ==
=== Early history ===
Prior to 1997, Crown Agents was a UK public statutory corporation, overseen by the British Ministry of Overseas Development.

Crown Agents originated as a body conducting financial transactions for British colonies. Agents were first appointed in 1749 to transfer and account for grants made to colonies from the British Treasury. These representatives were known unofficially as 'Crown Agents' from at least 1758, and were accountable to colonial governments, though selected on the recommendation of the British government. A single body was created in 1833, when the Crown Agents' business was consolidated under two Joint Agents General for Crown Colonies with an office of several staff.

The opening words of A. W. Abbott's history were telling in the light of events to follow. “The Crown Agents have no formal Constitution and are not part of the United Kingdom Civil Service or of the United Kingdom Government machine. The Crown Agents are simply two individuals …who have been appointed by the Secretary of State for the Colonies.

In 1861 the office was renamed Crown Agents for the Colonies. Crown Agents' responsibilities on behalf of colonial governments included accounting for Treasury grants, purchasing supplies, recruiting certain staff and raising capital on the markets. Crown Agents also oversaw specific colonial projects, such as certain stamp issues and some infrastructure construction.

As decolonisation accelerated, the office was renamed Crown Agents for Oversea Governments and Administrations in 1954, and the rules were changed to allow it to take on projects for independent states (Iraq being the first example). Crown Agents expanded its activities to include more international development projects and investment management. The world's first sovereign wealth funds were managed by Crown Agents.

=== The Property Collapse of 1974 ===
==== Background ====
The financial collapse of the Crown Agents, which necessitated a bail-out by the Government, was one of the most high-profile failures of the 1974 property and secondary banking crisis, and widely considered a scandal. The decline in its traditional government business had led the Crown Agents “to consider ways of diversifying…and operating on their own account rather than acting as agents for others…So began a short but disastrous period in an otherwise long and distinguished service to others” The move into own account trading dated back to March 1967 and by the end of the 1960s, the activities of the Agents were being publicly queried by The Sunday Times and Private Eye. By 1970, concerns were being raised in Parliament. Judith Hart later referred back to her earlier comments, saying the "constitutional relationship between the Crown Agents and the Government, which was somewhat obscure..."

==== The Fay Report and Tribunal ====
The impact of the financial and property collapse on the Crown Agents’ finances became increasingly apparent during 1974 and in October John Cuckney was appointed to sort out the problems. To meet the potential financial shortfall, the Crown Agents received an £85m grant from the Government. Recognition of the severity of the Agents’ problems, the necessity for further financial support and the political ramifications led to the establishment of the Fay Committee of Enquiry in April 1975; that Committee reported on 1 December 1977. Among its detailed findings was the estimate that losses would exceed £200m.

The Fay report gives extensive detail on the Crown Agent's activities. It was a body without effective supervision in which inexperienced officers engaged in a wide range of speculative banking and property developments on a worldwide basis. “It is manifest from the minutes of the committee that during the period from 1967 to 1974 the conduct of the affairs of the Crown Agents and, in particular, the actions of certain of its staff, lacked competence and good judgement.” The parliamentary debate on the Fay report in turn led to the establishment in March 1978 of a Tribunal "to inquire to what extent there were lapses from accepted standards of commercial or professional conduct or of public administration in relation to the operations of the Crown Agents as financiers on own account in the years 1967–1974. The Tribunal findings were submitted in March 1982. In a formal statement to the House of Commons, the Prime Minister reported that “the tribunal has identified a number of serious shortcomings that existed at that time, not only in relation to the conduct of individuals, in respect of some of whom lapses or criticisms falling short of lapses were formally specified, but also in relation to the operation of institutions and procedures.”

==== The Investments ====
The best-known of the Crown Agents’ investments was with the William Stern group; Stern himself became Britain's largest ever bankrupt to date and the losses of the Crown Agents were reported to be £54m. Less well-known but also a substantial problem were the Australian property investments held under the umbrella of English and Continental Group, where losses were estimated as a possible £35m. There was also a commitment to a wide range of secondary banks. Margaret Reid regarded the Crown Agents’ support for them as “much the biggest and widely discussed amount of finance for the Bank of England's Lifeboat support operation”. Institutions singled out included Triumph Investment Trust, Sterling Industrial Trust and Burston Group.

Crown Agents also acquired Greenshields Cowie, a freight forwarding limited company, in 1973/74.

==== Recovery ====
The appointment of John Cuckney in October 1974 was the first step in rescuing the Crown Agents and restoring confidence in its traditional functions. He instituted a programme of controlled disposals, realizing what he could from the property and banking investments. Probably the most intransigent were the Australian property investments which took some years to bring under the Agents' full control. One of the most important organizational decisions made by Cuckney was in March 1977, concerning the Agents’ subsidiary, Millbank Technical Services. Millbank had been established in 1967 to offer services “outside their traditional agency role.” In effect, it had become a substantial exporter of military equipment. Millbank was transferred to the Ministry of Defence, thereby returning the Agents to its traditional activity. However, uncertainty continued over the legal status of the Crown Agents and it was not until the Crown Agents Act 1979 that the legal and constitutional position was regularized. The Act established the Agents as a corporate body under formal name of Crown Agents for Oversea Governments and Administrations.

The Crown Agents Act 1996 provided for the Crown Agents to become a private sector Foundation as a company limited by guarantee, with Crown Agents for Oversea Governments and Administrations as a wholly-owned subsidiary. This change came into effect in March 1997, with David Rowe-Ham as the first President of the Foundation and D. H. Probert as the first Chairman of the company.

In April 2016 its financial services arm, Crown Agents Bank and Crown Agents Investment Management, was sold to Helios Investment Partners.

==== Insolvency ====
On 28 July 2024, Crown Agents was reported to be on the verge of collapse. Crown Agents was placed into insolvency on the 1 August 2024, largely due to cuts in funding from the UK Government and cost reduction efforts in the Foreign & Commonwealth Office. An additional contributing factor that management mentioned was the ongoing cost of funding a pension liability.

== International development work ==
=== Disaster response and COVID-19 PPE and vaccine procurement & logistics work ===
The company provided support for the victims of the 2010 Earthquake in Haiti, the 2014 Ebola outbreak and Hurricane Irma in 2017. Since the outbreak of the COVID-19 pandemic in 2020, Crown Agents has been involved in transporting medical equipment and vaccines to remote locations.

On 15 January 2021, Crown Agents was appointed procurement agent to secure Covid-19 vaccines on behalf of the Ministry of Health of Ukraine. On 23 February, 500,000 doses of the Oxford AstraZeneca (Covishield) vaccine were delivered to the country.

=== Flagship programmes and global presence ===
==== Accelerating the Sustainable Control and Elimination of Neglected Tropical Diseases (Ascend) ====
Ascend is the UK Foreign, Commonwealth and Development Office's (FCDO) £200 million flagship health programme to protect millions of people worldwide from Neglected Tropical Diseases (NTDs). The programme works towards the sustainable control and elimination of NTDs in approximately 20 high burden countries in Africa and Asia and focuses on five NTDs: lymphatic filariasis, schistosomiasis, visceral leishmaniasis and trachoma. The programme contributes to Sustainable Development Goal (SDG) targets 3.3 and 3.8. Implemented between September 2019 to March 2022, Ascend consists of two Lots - one focusing on South Asia, East and Southern Africa (Lot 1) and the other on West and Central Africa (Lot 2). Crown Agents leads Ascend Lot 1 and works with a consortium of technical partners, including Abt Associates, Oriole Global Health and the Royal Tropical Institute. Central to the Ascend Lot 1 approach is close collaboration with National Governments and other implementing partners to enhance national approaches to NTD control and elimination.

==== South Sudan ====
In South Sudan, Crown Agents provides 10 million people with life-saving healthcare through the South Sudan Health Pooled Fund (now in its third phase- HPF3). HPF is a partnership with the Government of South Sudan's Ministry of Health (MoH).

==== Zimbabwe ====
In Zimbabwe, Crown Agents implements the Results-Based Financing (RBF) programme in partnership with Zimbabwe Ministry of Health.

==== Sierra Leone ====
In Sierra Leone, Crown Agents is delivering the Saving Lives Programme as part of a public health consortium. Saving Lives is one of the Foreign, Commonwealth & Development Office's (FCDO) flagship health programmes. Phase 1 of the programme has been delivered and focused on increasing access to preventive services, including family planning, water, sanitation and long lasting insecticide treated bednets. It also improved service quality in line with the maternal and child health priorities of the President's 10-24 Month Recovery Plan. Now in the second phase the programme builds on the gains of the first phase, increasing equitable access to improved reproductive, maternal, newborn, child health services, whilst strengthening local health systems for more sustainable service delivery.

Crown Agents is also working with partners at the Sierra Leone Ministry of Health and Sanitation, the U.S. Center for Disease Control and Prevention, the Public Health Informatics Institute and the International Association of National Public Health Institutes on the Child Health and Mortality Prevention Surveillance (CHAMPS) Sierra Leone programme. With the country having some of the highest rates of child mortality in the world, CHAMPS’ goal is to produce the data needed to inform evidence-based policies that can prevent deaths of under 5-year olds. To achieve this, the programme seeks to identify definitive causes of death of children under 5 using digital data collection tools and Minimally Invasive Tissue Samples (MITS). Crown Agents is contracted by Emory University, who leads the programme globally, as the Fiscal Agent for Sierra Leone while also providing management oversight of the programme.

==== Ukraine ====
Since 2015, Crown Agents has been supporting the Ministry of Health in Ukraine in strengthening the country's health sector procurement. Crown Agents’ achievements in Ukraine have been recognised in the international magazine The Economist: “The health ministry contracted Crown Agents…and two United Nations bodies to buy medicines on its behalf…When the results came back…they showed a 38% saving compared with 2015, without compromising on the quality of the drugs. Whereas before, two or three suppliers dominated supply, Crown Agents have brought in almost 30, thus defeating the tricks previously used to corner the market.”

==== Libya ====
In Libya, Crown Agents implements the three-year programme Tazeez, financed by the UK Government's (FCDO's) Conflict Stability and Security Fund (CSSF) and supported by the Government of Libya.

==== Nepal ====
In Nepal, Crown Agents manages the Nepal Safer Schools Project (NSSP), a Foreign, Commonwealth and Development Office (FCDO)-funded project seeking to increase the safety of more than 200 vulnerable schools in Nepal and build the resilience of pupils, staff and the wider community to disasters. To achieve this, the NSSP upgrades physical infrastructure to be more resilient, strengthens disaster risk management in schools and ensures disaster resilience informs curriculum and teacher training and resources.

Crown Agents also works in partnership with donors and the Government of Nepal to support public financial management (PFM) reform at the national, sub-national and sectoral level, encouraging greater financial accountability throughout the system. The Nepal Public Financial Management and Accountability Programme (PFMA) supports reforms in government policies, systems and activities to improve PFM and revenue systems, reducing opportunities for corruption in Government of Nepal (GoN) service delivery sectors that matter most for the poor. PFMA2 builds on some elements of a previous programme (Deepening Public Financial Management and Accountability in Nepal) that supported PFM reforms within specific sectors (such as health, climate change, and peace and justice) and delivered analysis on fiduciary risks across the UK Aid Nepal portfolio.

==== Training and Professional Development ====
Through training and professional development programmes, Crown Agents has worked for over 50 years with governments, NGOs, private and public sector corporations offering scheduled training courses, customised programmes and consultancy services.

==== Other work ====
Furthermore, the company has provided governmental services as large as reforming the customs system of Angola, and transforming the central medical stores in Zambia.

Crown Agents is a member of the Partnership for Supply Chain Management, a partnership of thirteen private sector, non-governmental and faith-based organizations that implements the SCMS project, providing a reliable, cost-effective and secure supply of products for HIV/AIDS programs.

== Partners ==
Crown Agents partners with development agencies, donors, private corporations, foundations and governments. Some of them are:

- African Development Bank
- Asian Development Bank
- Bill & Melinda Gates Foundation
- Children's Investment Fund Foundation
- Commercial Bank of Ethiopia
- European Union
- Government of Ghana
- Government of Lebanon
- Government of Nigeria
- Government of Tajikistan
- Government of Ukraine
- Government of Zimbabwe
- Millennium Challenge Corporation
- UK Department for International Trade
- UK Foreign, Commonwealth and Development Office
- UNICEF
- United Nations Development Programme
- United States Agency for International Development
- United States Trade and Development Agency
- World Bank

=== Member organizations ===
Additionally, the Crown Agents Foundation includes a number of member organizations. Those include:

- Aga Khan Foundation
- Amref Health Africa
- British Expertise
- British Standards Institution
- Caribbean Council
- Charities Aid Foundation
- Chartered Institute of Logistics and Transport
- Chartered Institute of Purchasing & Supply
- Christian Aid
- Concern Worldwide
- Institute of Development Studies
- International Chamber of Commerce
- Practical Action
- Royal Commonwealth Society
- Royal Society of Arts
- Standard Chartered Bank
- Transparency International
- Unilever

Former members include the Chartered Institute of Building and Care International.

== Awards ==
The work of Crown Agents has won several awards throughout the years. The most notable are:

- Supply Chain Excellence Awards: Extreme Logistics Category, (2018 and 2019)
- Supply Chain Excellence Awards: Public and Third Sector Category (2016)

== Sources ==
- Sunderland, David (2004). Managing the British Empire: The Crown Agents, 1833–1914. Boydell. ISBN 0-86193-267-6.
- Sunderland, David (2007). Managing British Colonial and Post-Colonial Development: The Crown Agents, 1914-1974. Boydell. ISBN 978-1-84383-301-7.
