= Institute of Business Ethics =

Professional organization in London, England

- Founded: November 1986; 40 years ago
- Founder: Neville John Cooper
- Registration no.: 11594672
- Location: London, England
- Region served: Worldwide
- Key people: Simon Webley (Research Director 1998–2016); Philippa Foster Back (director 2001–2020); Lauren Branston (CEO since 2024)
- Website: www.ibe.org.uk

The Institute of Business Ethics or IBE is a non-profit professional organisation based in London, which works to promote business ethics through consciousness raising and institutional collaborations nationwide and internationally.

== History ==
The Institute of Business Ethics was founded by Neville John Cooper (1924–2002), the chairman of the Christian Association of Business Executives (CABE) from 1985 and a member of the governing council of the Confederation of British Industry (CBI) in 1985–1986, who had worked as a telecom executive during the 1970s and had been an activist for Moral Re-Armament before 1964. The IBE originated out of CABE in response to Cooper being tasked by Sir Terence Beckett, the director-general of CBI, with propagating written codes of ethical conduct in British corporate practice. It emerged as part of a wave of business ethics institutionalisation across Europe during the mid-1980s.

The IBE was launched in November 1986 with an appeal at the Mansion House by the Lord Mayor of London, Sir David Rowe-Ham, against the backdrop of the deregulation of the City of London in 1986, known as The Big Bang. According to Philippa Foster Back CBE, the director of IBE in 2016, the founders reacted to the deregulation by fostering a new framework of business trust rooted in ethics, instead of law. The IBE has been credited with seeking to uphold the London Stock Exchange's motto "My Word Is My Bond" under the changed conditions in which short-term financial transactions prevailed.

Originally, the IBE operated as a fund within the CABE, which is a registered charity established in 1937 (as Catholic Industrialists' Conference, under the aegis of UNIAPAC) to promote the study and application of Christian moral principles in the conduct of business. In 2000, the IBE obtained separate charitable status; its charitable goals being "to advance public education in business ethics and related subjects with particular reference to the study and application of ethical standards in the management and conduct of industry and business generally in the United Kingdom and elsewhere".

In 1991, the IBE was among the backers of the Cadbury Committee, which helped spread the concept of corporate governance internationally.

Since its founding, the IBE has published more than 20 books on business ethics topics; conducted surveys on the use of codes of ethics within companies; developed training programmes in business ethics, from induction programmes to the board room; worked with academics and business schools to promote the study of business ethics within MBA and business studies courses; and offered advice and support to business ethics practitioners and their companies.

The Anglican economist Simon Webley – who had pioneered business ethics surveys for the free market corporate lobby group Aims of Industry in 1966, and later served as the British director of the British-North American Committee from 1969 to 1998 and as a board member of the Centre for Policy Studies until 1989 – joined as a consultant at the IBE's inception in 1986 and assumed the post of Research Director in 1998. He remained in this capacity in 2016, before the IBE was incorporated anew in 2018. He authored or co-authored 20 of the IBE's 91 freestanding publications between 1987 and 2017, and was responsible for the IBE's 30th anniversary video series titled "Pearls of Wisdom".

In the estimation of a scholar, the IBE over the thirty years of its activity from 1986 to 2016 failed to deliver on its mission to improve the moral standards of business activity or change its image in society.

== Bibliography ==
- Mees, Bernard (2020), The Rise of Business Ethics, New York: Routledge, ISBN 978-1-138-61407-9
