= CAB Payments =

British payments processor

CAB Payments Holdings plc
- Company type: Public
- Traded as: LSE: CABP
- Industry: Financial services
- Founded: 2016
- Headquarters: Southwark, London, England
- Key people: Anne Cairns (Chairman); Neeraj Kapur (CEO)
- Revenue: ▲£119.0 million (2025)
- Operating income: ▲£18.5 million (2025)
- Net income: ▼£13.6 million (2025)
- Website: www.cabpayments.com

CAB Payments Holdings plc is a British payment processing and foreign exchange business. It is listed on the London Stock Exchange.

== History ==
The business originated when the Crown Agents' business was consolidated under two Joint Agents General for Crown Colonies with an office of several staff in 1833. In April 2016 Crown Agents demerged its financial services arm, Crown Agents Bank and Crown Agents Investment Management, and sold it to Helios Investment Partners.

The company launched its new online foreign exchange platform, EMPowerFX, which was primarily intended for the exchange of currencies used in developing countries, in February 2018.

In 2019, it went on to acquire a payment gateway system from Segovia, a financial technology company focused on cross-border payments.

The company was the subject of an initial public offering on the London Stock Exchange, which valued the company at £851 million, in July 2023.

On 24 October 2023, only three months after its IPO, CAB Payments issued a profit warning causing its share price to collapse by 74% on the day.
