= MOGAS Group =

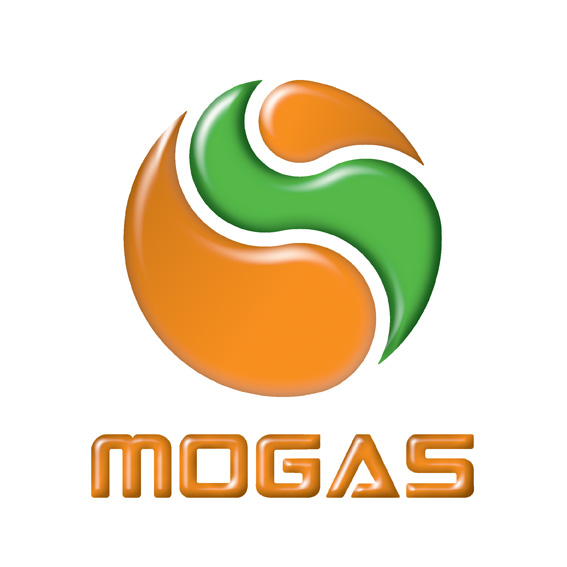
- Company type: Privately-owned Corporation
- Industry: Oil and Gas
- Founded: 1987 – Kampala, Uganda
- Headquarters: Kampala, Uganda (Corporate Office); Dubai, UAE (Registered Office)
- Area served: Uganda, Tanzania, Kenya, Burundi, Rwanda, DR Congo, United Arab Emirates
- Key people: Geoffrey Rugazoora (CEO)
- Products: Fuel and lubricants
- Website: http://www.mogasoil.com

Maestro Oil and Gas Solutions (MOGAS) is a multinational integrated downstream oil marketing company. As of 2015, its business operations include international oil trading, fuels and lubrication services and retail networks. The company is registered in the UAE and has its head office in Kampala, Uganda but is operational in Uganda, Kenya, Tanzania, DRC, U.A.E, Rwanda and Burundi.

== History ==
In 1987, MOGAS began its operations in Uganda as the distributor of lubricants brand Castrol and as a fuel reseller. Since then MOGAS has gone on to expand its business across East and Central Africa as well as having operations outside of the African continent under MOGAS International Limited in the UAE. As of February 2015, the MOGAS Group has established offices in seven countries as well as serving a number of others.

== Operational Countries ==
Areas served by MOGAS GROUP
Operational countries		Additional areas served	
Uganda	Kenya	Algeria	Egypt
Tanzania	DR Congo	India	Pakistan
Rwanda	Burundi	Tunisia	
UAE			

=== Uganda ===
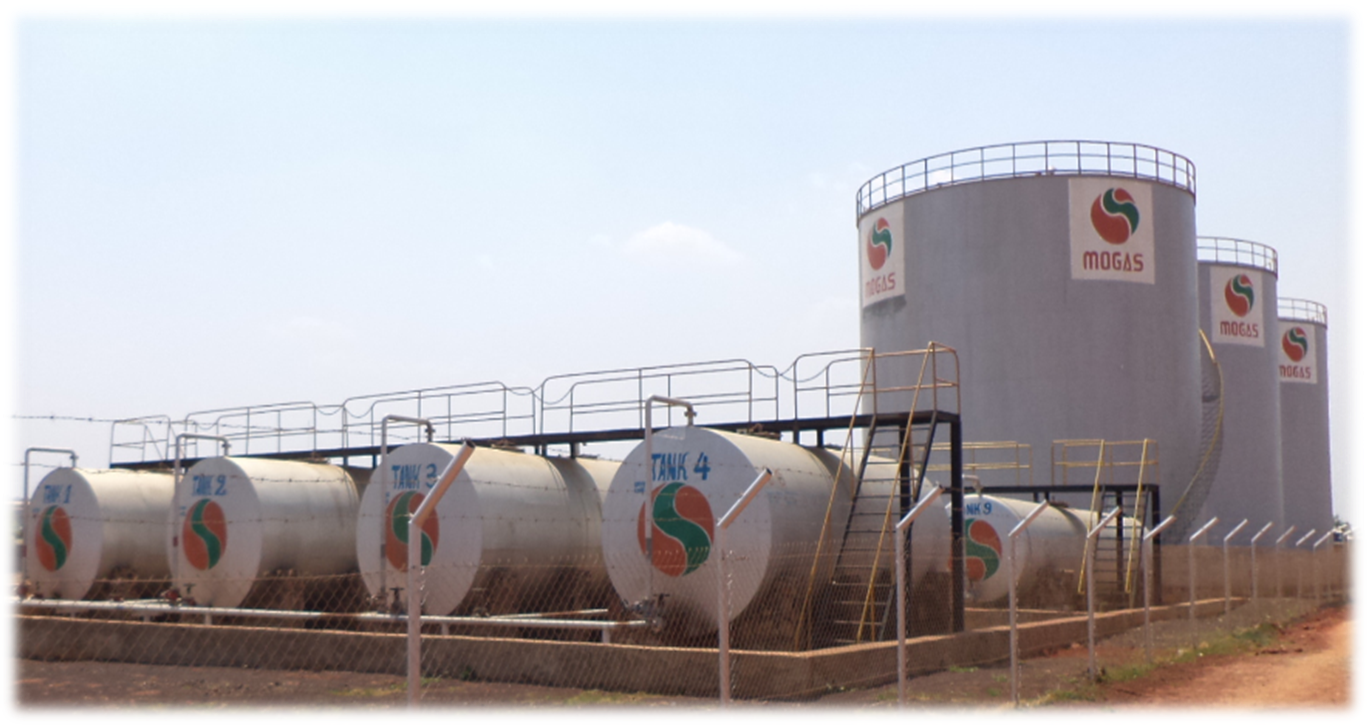
MOGAS Terminal

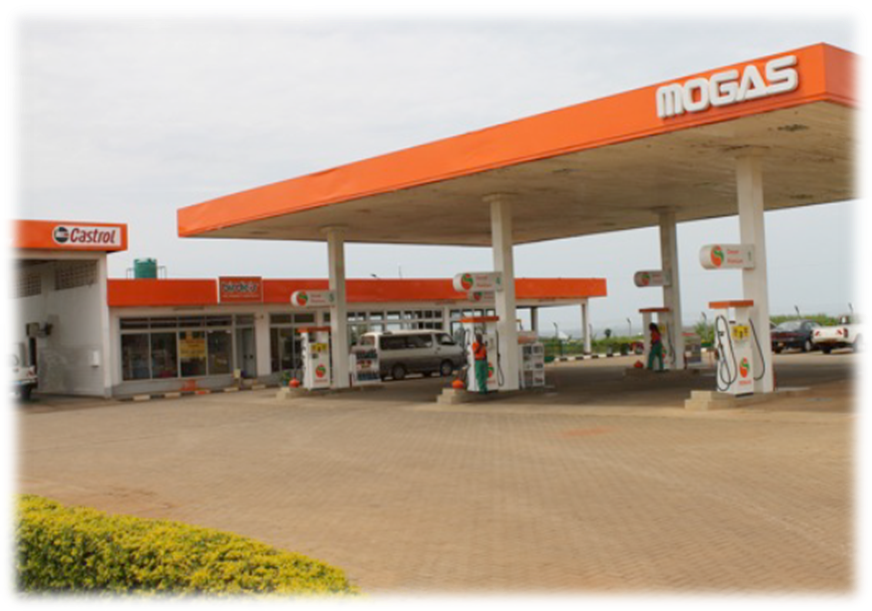
MOGAS Station

As of June 2015, the company has over 35 modern retail outlets spread across a number of major towns and highways in Uganda with on-going plans to expand in areas the traditional oil companies may have shunned. MOGAS Uganda’s main operations are in Banda, Wakiso District where it built a multimillion-dollar depot on a four-acre plot of land.

=== Kenya ===
MOGAS has been operating in Kenya since early 2000. The company is licensed and amongst the oil companies in Kenya that import and market petroleum products and, participate in overland fuel trading. As of June 2015, the company has over 17 modern retail outlets spread across a number of major towns and highways in Kenya including those that connect Kenya to other East African Countries. MOGAS Kenya has its head office in Nairobi.

=== Tanzania ===
MOGAS Tanzania Limited has been in operation since 1998 and accommodates the core assets of the MOGAS Group including two marine terminals. These terminals are used to support MOGAS Tanzania as well as MOGAS Congo, MOGAS Burundi and MOGAS Rwanda. As of June 2015, the company has over 13 service stations spread across the country and has its head office in Dar es Salaam.

=== Democratic Republic of Congo ===
MOGAS Congo SPRL has been operating in DRC since 2007. The company’s main operation in Congo is in the South and East of the country and is based in Lubumbashi, where it has an inland storage facility.

=== Rwanda ===
MOGAS Rwanda Limited has been in operation since 2010. The company obtains the products it sells from the marine terminals in Tanzania and additional supplies from Mombasa in Kenya. MOGAS Rwanda has one retail station and its main offices are located in Kigali.

=== Burundi ===
MOGAS Burundi SPRL has been in operation since 2010. The company is supported by the marine terminals in Tanzania and is key in the overland trading and supply of MOGAS Group products to Eastern DRC. As of June 2015, MOGAS Burundi has a retail network of 7 service stations and its main offices are located in Bujumbura and is one of the trusted petroleum suppliers in Burundi.

== International Operations ==
MOGAS International Limited is located at the AG (Silver) Tower in Dubai, UAE and has been in operation since 2005. MOGAS International is the central hub for the supply and trading activities of the business. It is also the location where blending of MOGAS’ lubricants are blended. MOGAS International’s key customers are located in North Africa and Asia.

== Corporate social responsibility ==
=== Work with the Uganda Heart Institute ===
In 2011, MOGAS Uganda worked in collaboration with Rotary, Gift of Life and the Uganda Heart Institute. MOGAS Uganda donated US$10,000 to the project that enabled Uganda Heart Institute to carry out cardiac surgery on underprivileged citizens suffering from a number of different heart conditions.

=== Motorcyclists (Boda-boda) ===
In February 2015, MOGAS Uganda in partnership with Mulago hospital and the Boda-boda Riders association launched the Boda-boda Welfare club in Kampala. This event included representatives of MOGAS visiting a ward in Mulago Hospital dedicated to caring for victims of motorcycle accidents. During the visit, a cheque of 5 million Uganda Shillings (approx. US$1,735) was given to the hospital to help cover the medical costs of the victims.
