= Del Monte Kenya =

Kenyan food processing company

Del Monte Kenya Limited
- Type: Subsidiary
- Industry: Food
- Founded: 1965; 61 years ago
- Headquarters: Thika, Kenya
- Key people: Stergios Gkaliamoutsas, managing director
- Products: Pineapple cultivation, processing and canning; production of juice concentrates, mill juice sugar and cattle feed
- Revenue: KSh.4.5 billion/= (2011 estimate)
- Number of employees: Approximately 6,000 (2006 estimate)
- Parent: Del Monte Corporation
- Website: http://www.delmonteeurope.com/

Del Monte Kenya Limited is a Kenyan food processing company that operates in the cultivation, production, and canning of pineapple products. The company produces canned solid pineapple, juice concentrates, mill juice sugar and cattle feed. Kenya's largest single manufactured export is canned pineapple, and the country ranks among the top five pineapple exporters in the world, both of which feats are direct results of the company's existence and operations. In the past, the company received negative publicity stemming from conflicts with workers and human rights groups, and the company has been targeted by human rights groups for hazardous conditions at the facility, poor living and working conditions for workers and for intimidating trade union groups. In 2001, the company took significant steps to address and correct matters per these concerns, however as of 2025 there have been numerous fatalities in incidents on Kenyan farms owned by Del Monte.

== History ==
The company was previously known as Kenya Canners, which formed in 1948. Del Monte Kenya was later renamed Del Monte Royal after control was acquired by two South African families who each owned a 30% share of the company. The remaining 40% was owned by many small shareholders. This occurred after the sale of the US company Del Monte Corporation in 1965. In 2002, Cirio Alimentare acquired a 98% stake in the company, and following this the company changed its name to Cirio Del Monte Kenya Limited. The company was certified under the International Organization for Standardization SA8000 in 2002, and was recertified in March 2006. Del Monte Kenya also acquired the International Organization for Standardization 9002 certificate.

== Overview ==
Del Monte Kenya owns a 10,000-acre (40 km^{2}) pineapple plantation and employs approximately 6,000 workers (2006 estimate). Approximately 60% of the workforce is female (2004 estimate). The company employs three types of employees: permanent staff, seasonal workers and casual laborers. Permanent staff receive sick pay, holidays, rental assistance, severance pay and have a contract. Seasonal workers earn less and do not receive severance pay, although they also have a contract. Casual labourers receive no benefits and are not covered by a contract. All compensation is aligned with Kenya's governmental laws that mandate a minimum wage of approximately KSh.2,800/= a month (2004 figures). The company's pineapple plantations are patrolled by security guards on horseback that utilise dogs, or in Jeeps.

== Production ==
In 2011 the company's annual revenue was estimated at KSh.4.5 billion/= and its processing capacity was 1,500 tons of pineapples daily. Due to the company's existence and operations, the largest single manufactured export from Kenya is canned pineapple. Additionally, Kenya ranks among the top five pineapple exporters in the world due to the presence and operations of Cirio Del Monte Kenya. Their products are primarily exported to the European market. 34% of the company's production is juice concentrate, 22% is solid pineapple, 21% is mill juice sugar and 22% is cattle feed.

== Controversy ==
The company experienced labour disputes that generated negative publicity and had received the attention of human rights groups. A report in 1999 by Société Générale de Surveillance concluded that Del Monte did not allow workers freedom to join trade unions, and union workers were not allowed to communicate with employees. The report also found that the company routinely threatened shop stewards with termination. Additional findings were that Del Monte did not have a safety plan in the event of an emergency, did not make first aid kits available to employees, did not provide ear protection to workers in high decibel environments and did not provide gas masks to employees using chemical sprays.

In 1999, Centro Nuovo Modello di Sviluppo (CNMS), an Italian human rights group, began a campaign for consumers in Italy to boycott Del Monte pineapples after research conducted by the group found conditions at the company's factory to be inferior. This campaign was backed by the Kenya Human Rights Commission, which stated that wages were not enough to meet basic needs, that living quarters and sanitation was "disgraceful," toxic pesticides deemed by the World Health Organization as "Extremely hazardous" and "Highly hazardous" were being used, and that the company was intimidating internal trade union leaders, among other concerns. In the past, Del Monte Royal had asserted that no evidence had been existent to corroborate CNMS' claims of any illness, disease of fatalities resulting from unsafe conditions.

On 5 October 2000, the company was asked by the Kenya Human Rights Commission (KHRC) to cease intimidation of trade unionists with Del Monte Kenya. KHRC also requested that Del Monte Kenya address matters regarding worker protection from chemicals, housing concerns and environmental pollution.

In the book Responsibility in World Business: Managing Harmful Side-Effects of Corporate Activity, published in 2004, it was stated that "the hue and cry over human rights violations that rocked Del Monte Kenya is now over."

The company has been at the center of an ongoing tussle with the local community in a land ownership row with the local community whose members claim the company's land as their rightful ancestral home.

In June 2023, British newspaper The Guardian reported that multiple killings occurred at Del Monte's pineapple farm in Kenya, where security guards allegedly murdered trespassers and showed general violence against locals. Multiple alleged thieves were beaten to death by the guards, and at least one of the thieves was found with his throat cut. Locals claim serious human rights violations and are seeking for compensation from the company. In response, Del Monte's customers, such as Tesco of the UK, suspended their orders of pineapples pending Del Monte's internal investigation of the matter. In August 2025 Michael Muiruri Murigi was killed by a pick-up truck on the farm and in the ensuing days "violent" protests erupted on the farm, leading to police killing a man identified as either Harrison Kibandi Marubu or Stephen Marubu. County police claimed the death happened after approximately 150 pineapple thieves “armed with machetes [and] stones” attacked officers and G4S guards.

=== Company responses ===
In July 2001, the company signed an agreement to support the campaign for worker rights, and shop stewards stated that positive changes were occurring. Additionally, in December 2001, the company started a tree-planting campaign in its neighborhood as part of a pledge to promote sustainable land use and environmental protection.

=== Legal matters ===
On 22 October 2004, the company was ordered by a Kenyan court to compensate three of its prior employees who were exposed to toxic emissions there with almost KSh.5.5 million/=.

== See also ==
- Del Monte Corporation
- List of companies of Kenya

== Bibliography ==
- Bomann-Larsen, Lene; Wiggen, Oddny (2004) Responsibility in World Business: Managing Harmful Side-Effects of Corporate Activity. United Nations University Press. pages 160–174. ISBN 9280811037
