= Total M&S Uganda =

Ugandan petroleum company

- Type: Subsidiary of a public limited company
- Industry: Petroleum products marketing and distribution
- Founded: 1955
- Headquarters: Kampala, Uganda
- Key people: Florentin de Loppinot managing director
- Products: Oil, natural gas, lubricants
- Parent: Total S.A.
- Website: Homepage

Total M&S Uganda (TMSU) is a petroleum products marketing, distribution, and services company in Uganda. It is a subsidiary of TotalEnergies, the multinational oil, gas, and petrochemical conglomerate, headquartered in Paris, France. It is not to be confused with another Ugandan subsidiary, Total E&P Uganda, which is responsible for exploration and production and has been in the country since 2010.

== Location ==
The headquarters of the company are in the industrial area of Kampala, the capital and largest city of Uganda, at 4 Eighth Street. The coordinates of the company head offices are 0°18'49.0"N, 32°35'54.0"E (Latitude:0.313597; Longitude:32.598324).

== Operations ==
In June 2016, Total SA acquired the assets and liabilities of Gapco Limited, a petroleum products company that was operating in Kenya, Tanzania, and Uganda. Following that transaction, Total M&S Uganda acquired 37 new fuel service stations, bringing the total number of fuel stations it operates in the country to 162, the highest owned by any fuel marketing and distribution company in the country.

== Partnership ==
In September 2016, Total M&S Uganda signed a partnership agreement with Good African Coffee (GAC), a Ugandan coffee processing company, where GAC will exclusively sell instant, roast, and ground coffee at Total Uganda's 125 service stations countrywide. GAC buys raw coffee from least 14,000 farmers, which it markets locally and in two British supermarket chains, Sainsbury's and Waitrose.

== See also ==
- Uganda Oil Refinery
- Uganda National Oil Company
- Uganda-Tanzania Crude Oil Pipeline
