= David Rowe-Ham =

British accountant (1935–2020)

Arms of the City of London, with dragon supporters

Sir David Kenneth Rowe-Ham (19 December 1935 – 21 July 2020), until about 1959 David Kenneth Ham, was a British chartered accountant who served as Lord Mayor of London, Master of the Company of Chartered Accountants, and President of the Crown Agents.

== Early life ==
Born in Brighton in December 1935, as David K. Ham, the only son of Kenneth Henry Rowe Ham and his wife Muriel Phyllis Mundy, as a child the young Ham lived in Worcester. He was educated at the Dragon School and Charterhouse. In July 1955, as David Kenneth Ham, a cadet from the Mons Officer Cadet School, he was commissioned into the Royal Armoured Corps as a second lieutenant on the National Service list. In October 1956, he transferred as Second Lieutenant D. K. Ham into the Emergency Reserve of Officers of the Mobile Defence Corps; later, with a promotion to Lieutenant and a change of name to Rowe-Ham, he received further Emergency Reserve commissions in February 1957, February 1959, and April 1960.

In 1957, Kenneth, Muriel, and David K. Ham were voters together in Edgbaston.

== Career ==
As Ham, Rowe-Ham was articled for five years at Carter and Company, a large provincial accountancy practice, and qualified as a chartered accountant from Edgbaston in 1962. The same year, in the name of Kenneth Rowe-Ham, his father was managing director of Bradley and Co. Ltd., hollow-ware manufacturers.

In the 1970s, Rowe-Ham was elected as a member of the Court of Common Council of the City of London Corporation and was a consultant to Touche Ross from 1984 to 1993. He was Sheriff of the City of London for 1984–1985 and Lord Mayor of London for 1986–1987. He was also Master of the Worshipful Company of Chartered Accountants in England and Wales for 1985–1986.

During his year as Lord Mayor, Rowe-Ham initiated the Lord Mayor's Dragon Awards, awarded for community engagement. At a banquet in the City for King Fahd of Saudi Arabia in March 1987, Rowe-Ham "stressed the esteem in which the British people hold the Kingdom and its people". He also hosted King Hassan II of Morocco.

In 1995, The Director described Rowe-Ham as "a leading light in the City with a wealth of directorships". In March 1997, he became the first President of the Crown Agents when they were converted into a private sector company limited by guarantee, with D. H. Probert as the first Chairman. In 1999, he was chairman of Brewin Dolphin. From 2006 until the end of 2010 he was Chairman of Arden Partners, of Edgbaston, a stockbroking and financial services company. From before 1991 until he resigned in 2018, he was a director of Olayan Europe Limited, of 140 Piccadilly.

Rowe-Ham continued for many years to hold office as an Alderman of the City of London and in October 2002 and May 2004 stepped in as "Lord Mayor Locum Tenens", acting as a deputy for Lord Mayors while they were indisposed.

== Personal life ==
In 1963, in Stratford upon Avon, Rowe-Ham married Elizabeth Jane Aston, and they had one son. In 1980, he married secondly Sandra Celia Nicholls, the widow of Ian Glover (died 1975), and with her had a second son, as well as gaining a young step-son.

He died on 21 July 2020, while living at Virginia Water.

== Honours ==
- Officer of the Order of Saint John of Jerusalem, July 1985
- Knight Grand Cross of the Order of the British Empire, October 1986
