= Davis & Shirtliff =

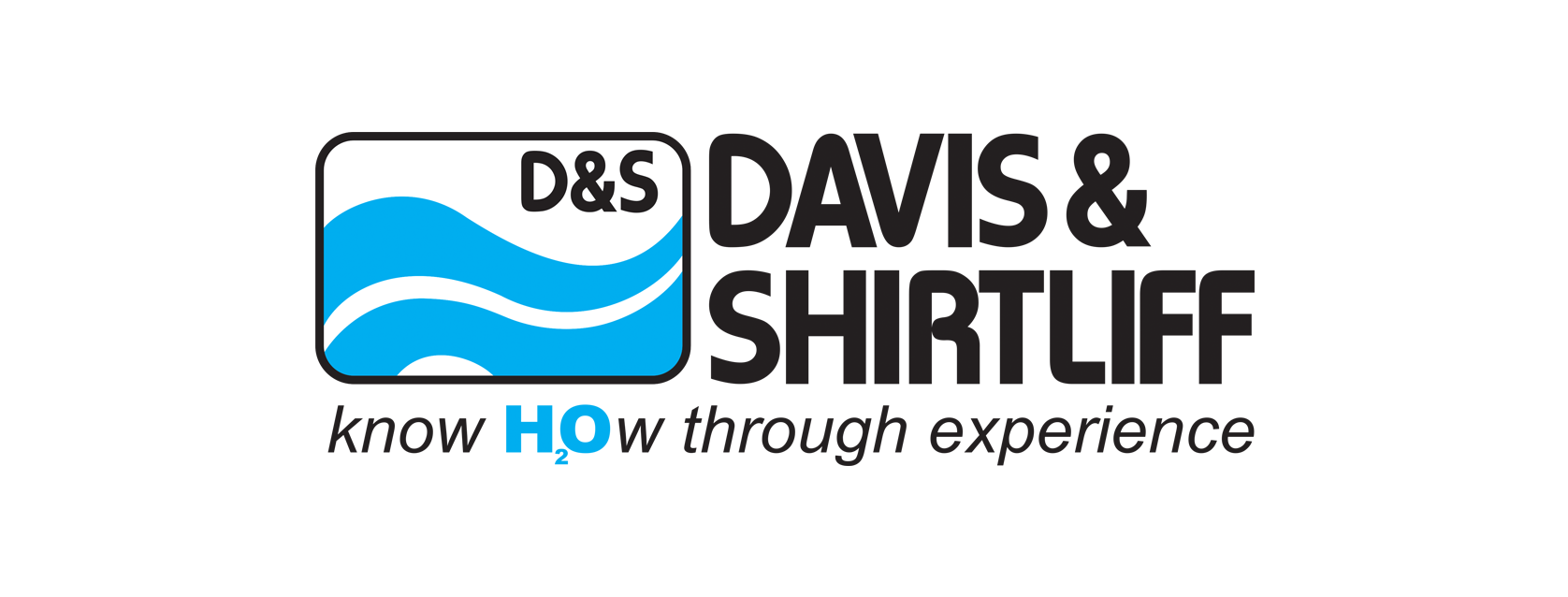

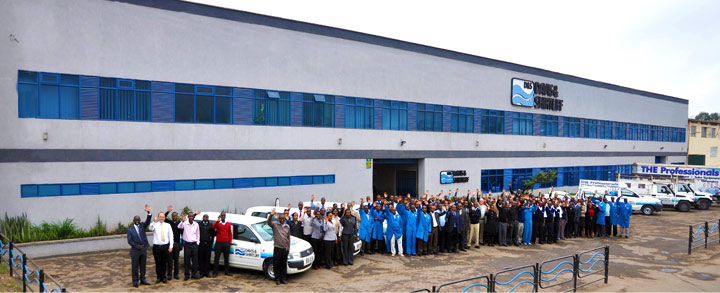
- Staff outside the HQ in Industrial Area, Nairobi
- Company type: Privately held company
- Industry: Water; Energy
- Founded: 1946; 80 years ago in Nairobi, Kenya
- Founder: Eddie Davis & Dick Shirtliff
- Headquarters: Nairobi, Kenya
- Area served: Kenya; Uganda; Tanzania; Zambia; Rwanda; Ethiopia; South Sudan; Democratic Republic of the Congo; Zimbabwe; Burundi; Ghana
- Key people: Alec R. Davis (Chairman); George Mbugua (CEO); Edward Davis (MD)
- Products: Water Pumps; Solar Solutions; General Machinery; Swimming Pools; Water Treatment; Chemicals; Irrigation & Water Supply Accessories; Controllers & Digital Solutions
- Brands: Dayliff, iDayliff, Bioliff
- Number of employees: 1200 (2024)
- Website: www.davisandshirtliff.com

The Davis & Shirtliff is a supplier of water related equipment in the East African region. Founded in Kenya in 1946, business activities are focused on six principal product sectors - water pumps, boreholes, swimming pools, water treatment, generators, solar energy equipment and irrigation. The group operates through a network of national branches as well as regional subsidiaries in Uganda, Tanzania, Zambia, Rwanda, South Sudan, Democratic Republic of the Congo, Zimbabwe and a partnership in Ethiopia.

== History ==
The Davis & Shirtliff Group was founded in 1946 as a partnership between EC 'Eddie' Davis and FR 'Dick' Shirtliff after Dick Shirtliff purchased 50% of RH Paige & Co., a small plumbing and water engineering firm founded in 1926 and which was bought into by Eddie Davis in 1945.

In 1947, it became a founding member of the Kenya Association of Building and Civil Engineering Contractors (KABCEC) and, in 1955, after purchasing two new plots of land and constructing new offices and workshops, moved its operations to its new site.

In 1965 it took delivery of the first consignment of pumps from Grundfos in Denmark and, in 1968, imported a consignment of Davey pumps from Australia. In 1982 the range of Grundfos products was expanded to include solar pumps.

1985 saw the appointment of Butech Limited as the Mombasa distributor of their products and the commencement of fibreglass filter production. In 1992, the group & Shirtliff purchased a 20% shareholding in Butech Limited; which was finally bought out in 2000, becoming the Mombasa Branch of Davis & Shirtliff.

In 1993 they imported their first Linz pumps from Pedrollo, Italy.

In 1995 they introduced the 'Pump Centre' and the establishment of a countrywide range of dealers. 1995 also saw the opening of a Branch in Eldoret.

Subsidiaries opened in Kampala and Dar-es-Salaam in 1996 and 1998 respectively.

== Operations ==
The company has expanded since inception. Throughout the first decade of the millennium, Davis & Shirtliff opened branches and subsidiaries in Lusaka; Kigali; Nakuru and Arusha; Zanzibar and Kitwe; Malindi; Addis Ababa, Mwanza and Diani;, Juba; and Mbeya in, 2001, 2004, 2005, 2006, 2007, 2008, 2010 and 2021 respectively, thereby expanding the distribution of its products and its consumer base. In 2001, Davis & Shirtliff was appointed the regional distributor for Pedrollo Pumps. In 2003, the firm's solar division was established as a regional distributor for Shell Solar. Also, in 2004, it became a Certikin distributor and, in 2005, was appointed as a Lister Petter engine generator distributor for the region.

The Davis and Shirtliff group is headquartered in Nairobi, Industrial Area. It is fully Kenyan owned and run. Its primary activities are water treatment, irrigation, borehole solutions, generators solar power solutions and water pumps. The group chairman and a 10-member executive team manage the company's day to day activities.

== Community work ==
The company assists needy institutions to obtain water supplies. Funding for community activities is largely provided through an annual contribution from the company and its staff. Business partners are also involved and Grundfos has been supportive of the group’s activities through the donation of money, equipment and supplies.

Davis and Shirtliff has also partnered with Kenya Airways on a water project in Runana.
