= Gulf Energy SAOC =

Gulf Energy SAOC (GES), an affiliate of National Energy Services Reunited (NESR), is an oilfield services company in the Middle East and North Africa region. GES is one of the largest oil companies in Oman, and has additional operations in Kuwait, Saudi Arabia and Algeria.

== History ==
In November 2017, US-based National Energy Services Reunited Corp. (NESR) announced it will acquire GULF Energy SAOC, as well as National Petroleum Services. The acquisition was completed in June 2018.

In November 2019, the company opened its first manufacturing facility for cementing and casing accessories in Oman, in order to support its operations in the country.

Gulf Energy currently works with almost all of the major operators in Oman including Petroleum Development Oman (PDO), Occidental Petroleum (OXY), PTT Exploration and Production (PTTEP), MEDCO, Petrogas E&P and Daleel Petroleum.
