= Dawa Life Sciences =

Company based in Nairobi, Kenya

Coordinates: 01°14′48″S 36°52′27″E

- Company type: Private Company
- Industry: Pharmaceuticals; Animal Health
- Founded: 1994; 32 years ago
- Headquarters: Nairobi, Kenya
- Key people: Raju Mohindra Chairman; Ajay Patel Managing Director
- Revenue: US$ 23.7 million (KES 2.4 billion) (2018)
- Number of employees: 800+ (2021)
- Website: www.dawalifesciences.com

Dawa Life Sciences is a Kenyan life sciences company with core competencies in healthcare. It was founded by Dr. Raju Mohindra and Dr. Ajay Patel in 1994. Dawa Life Sciences provides better medication for humans and animals (Pharmaceuticals and Animal Health). The company is based in Kenya and is structured to offer a wide range of products and support throughout the region and beyond.

== Location ==
Dawa Life Sciences Pharmaceuticals: Dawa Limited, Nairobi, Kenya

Dawa Life Sciences Animal Health: Medisel Kenya Limited, Thika, Kenya

== History ==
1994 – Medisel Kenya Limited established in 1995 by Dr. Raju Mohindra and Dr Ajay Patel, focusing on distributing imported pharmaceuticals.

2004 – Acquisition of Dawa Pharmaceuticals Limited, adding pharmaceutical manufacturing capabilities

2013 – Construction of dedicated Beta Lactam manufacturing facility

2016 – Construction of Animal Health manufacturing facility

2020 – Dawa 2.0 Upgrade and expansion of existing general formulation block

2021 – Unification of identity to Dawa Life Sciences .

2023 - Disposal of KEL Chemicals

The pharmaceutical business division manufactures and distributes nearly 200 generic medicines in the region. The major dosage forms of products are tablets, capsules, syrups & suspensions.

== Pharmaceuticals ==
Dawa Limited, established as Dawa Pharmaceuticals Ltd. in 1974, was at the forefront of pharmaceutical manufacturing in East and Central Africa and made products under contract for the UK’s Beecham Pharmaceuticals which is now known as GSK. It was bought by Medisel Kenya Limited in 2004 as a strategy to grow and enhance the pharmaceutical industry in Kenya and then renamed Dawa Limited.

It has since grown and acquired a significant presence across African continent with commercial operations in more than eight countries in the sub-Saharan Africa. It is now one of the largest pharmaceutical manufacturers in the region and offers a wide range of pharmaceutical products. It had less than 50 personnel in October 2004 and has steadily grown to a staff of mire than 450 employees in 2021.

The pharmaceutical division focuses on providing generics in the therapeutic areas of infectious diseases, cardiology, neurology, gastroenterology, and endocrinology. Each year, Dawa Life Sciences Pharmaceuticals Division provides over 100 million treatments across 25 markets on the African continent.

== Animal health ==
Dawa Life Sciences Animal Health division concentrates on marketing products focused on livestock and companion animals. The dedicated facility can produce liquids, sachets, boluses, premixes, and external preparations for Animal Health.

== Operations ==
Dawa Life Sciences is a leading manufacturer and marketer in Kenya. It is expanding its scope of operation to become a global manufacturer while meeting various market demands. It has already an established a high-end manufacturing facility for penicillin products. It has business operations in Kenya, Uganda, Rwanda, Burundi, Zambia, Malawi, Ivory Coast, Democratic Republic of the Congo and South Sudan.

In 2023, Dawa Life Sciences disposed of its interest in KEL Chemicals as part of a strategic realignment of its core business operations.

== Ownership ==
The shares of stock of Dawa Life Sciences Pharmaceuticals and Animal Health Divisions are privately owned; belonging to Dawa Life Sciences.

== Dawa Life Sciences ==
Dawa Life Sciences is a conglomerate of three separate entities, all of which are aligned towards achieving the Group’s overall strategy. The companies and their lines of business are as below:

Dawa Limited: It is a pharmaceutical manufacturer & marketer in Africa (the anchor company).

Medisel (K) Limited: It is the parent and flagship company of the Dawa Life Sciences, an importer and marketer of pharmaceutical (for both human & animal health) & surgical products.

Forest Road Development Limited: It is a real estate company dedicated to the development of properties in varied segments including residential and commercial.

== See also ==
- Economy of Kenya
