= Boda boda =

Type of motorcycle or bicycle with a space for a passenger or for carrying goods

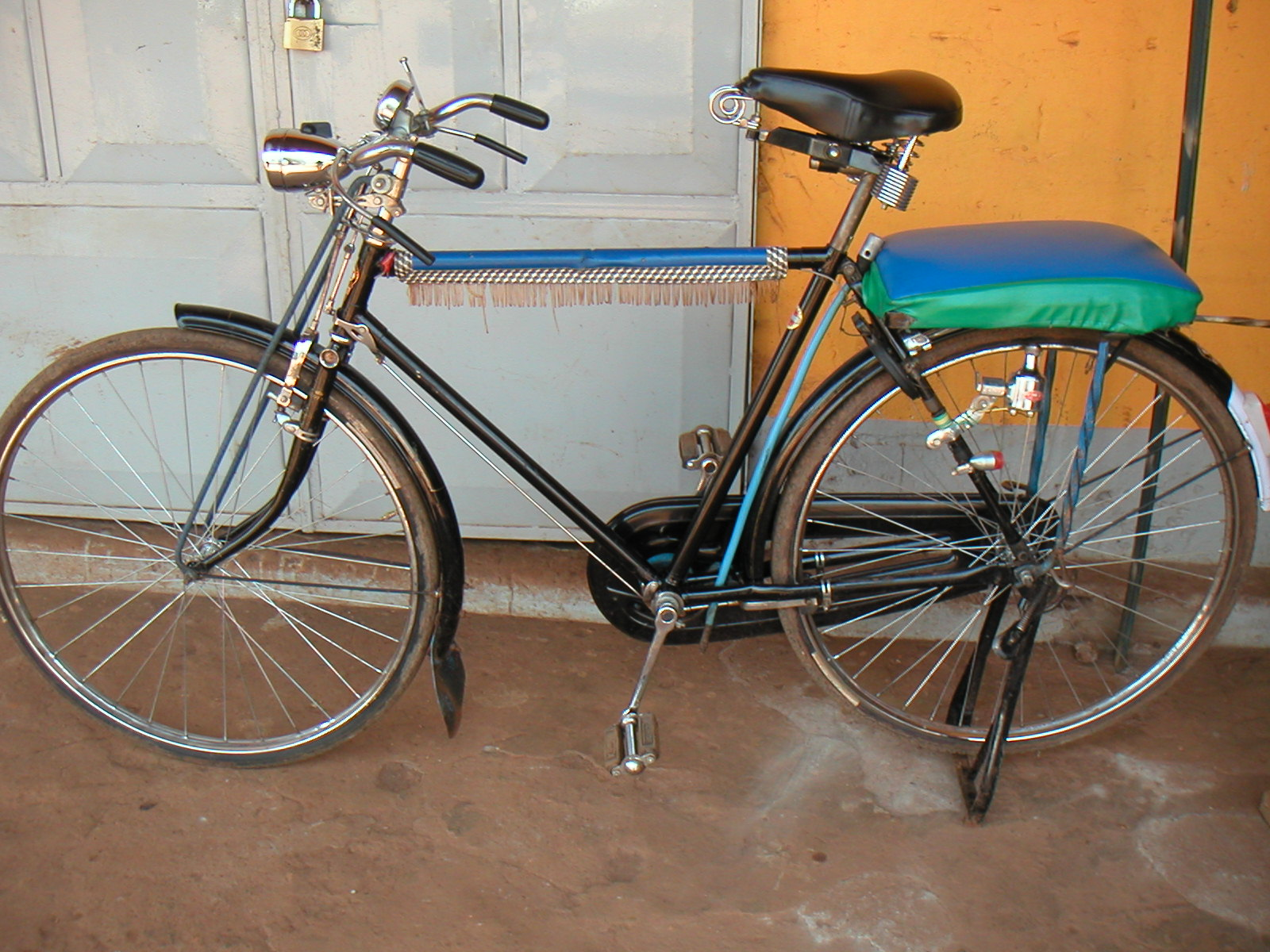
Bicycle boda boda in Masindi, Uganda c. 2009

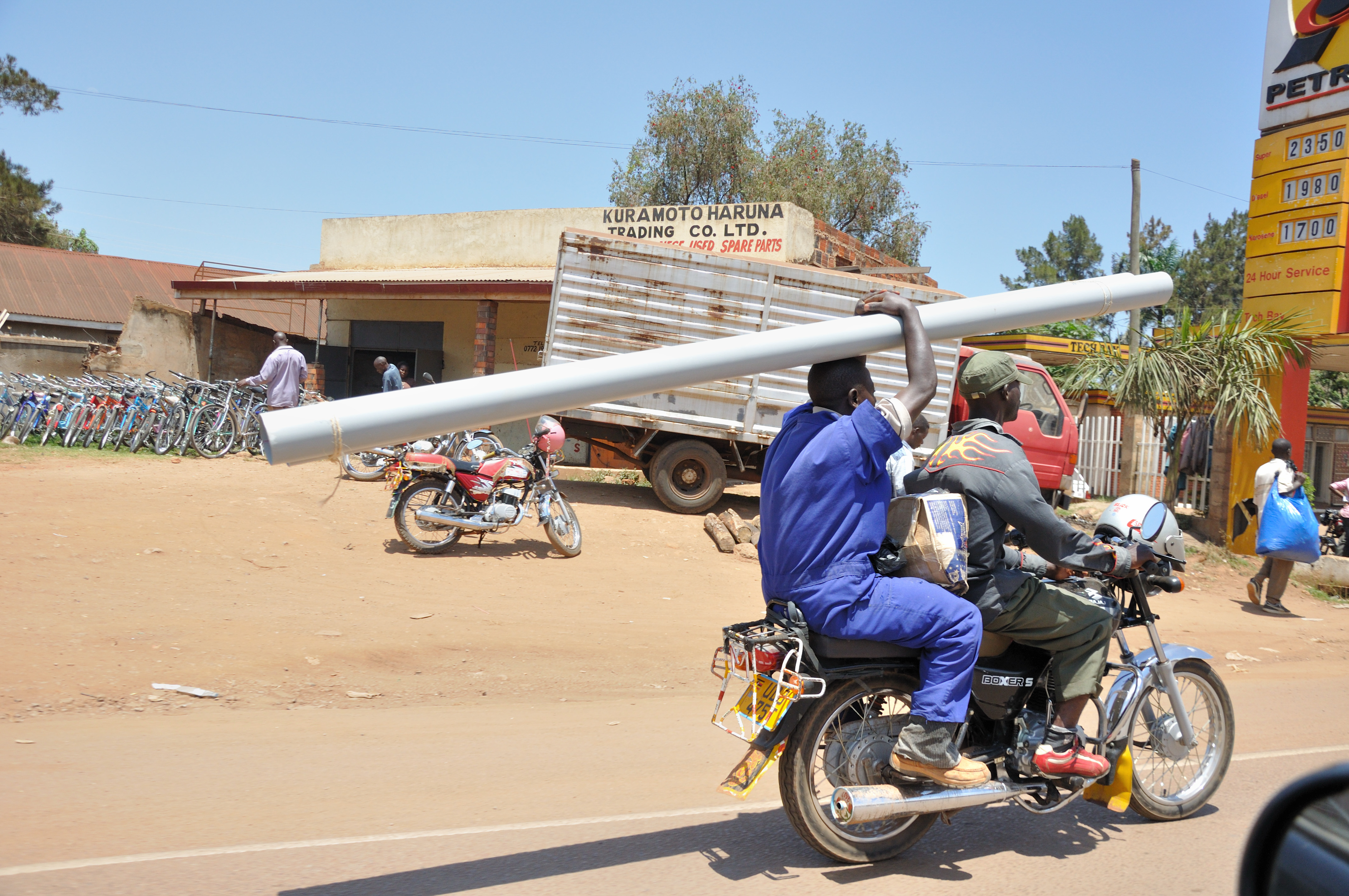
Motorcycle boda boda in Uganda c. 2010

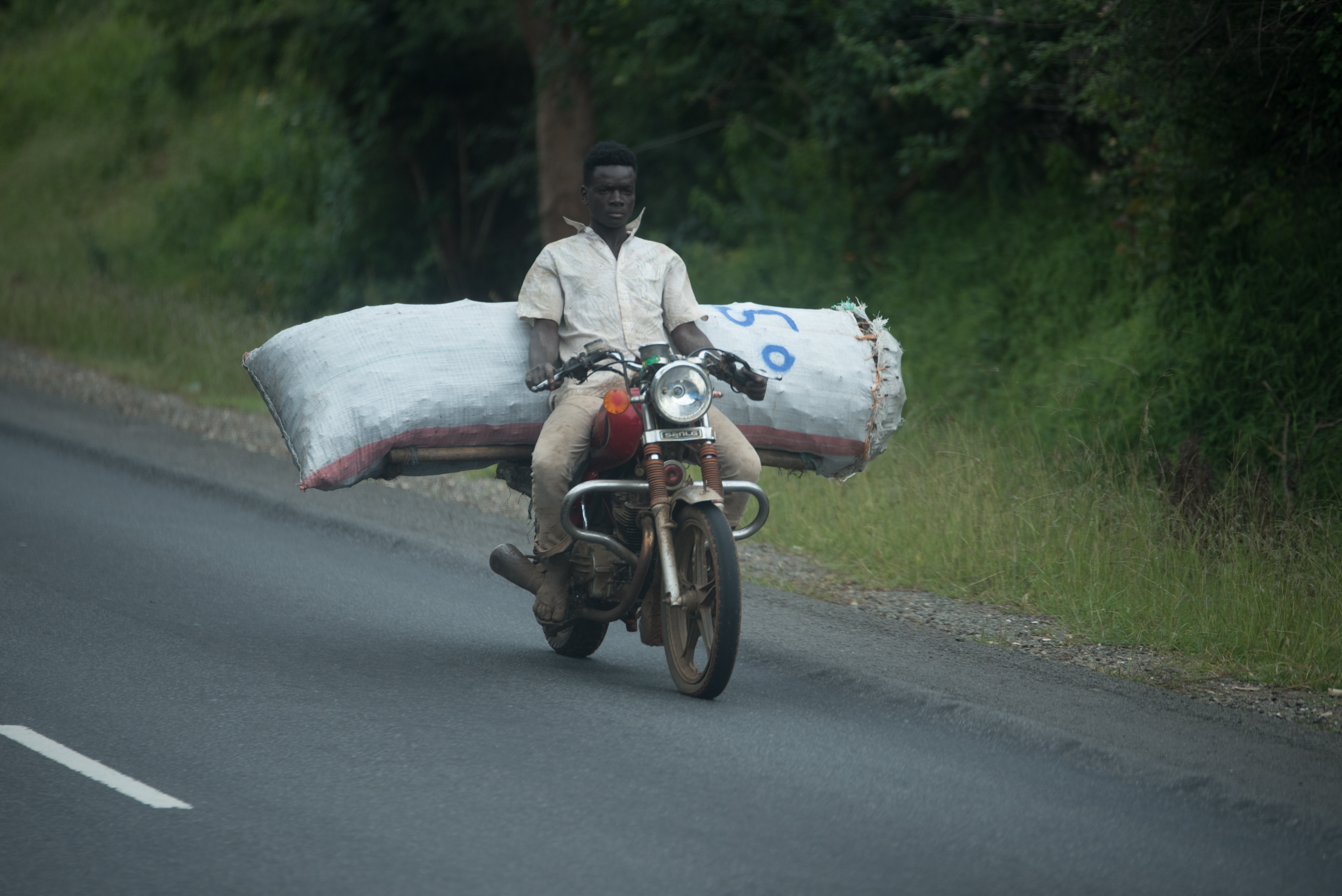
Boda boda driver in Tanzania c. 2017

A boda boda is a bicycle or motorcycle taxi commonly found in East Africa. While motorcycle taxis like boda bodas are present throughout Africa and beyond, the term boda boda is specific to East Africa. In Kenya, they are more frequently called piki pikis or Boda. Their ubiquitous presence in East African cities is the result of a number of factors including an increasing demand for public transit, the ability to purchase motorcycles on credit, and an influx of cheap imports from Indian manufacturers like Bajaj and high level of unemployment among the youth. In the countries where they are present, boda bodas can provide transportation options to riders and job opportunities to drivers while at the same time resulting in an increase in road hazards and collisions and unnecessary injuries and deaths.

== Etymology ==
The name boda boda comes from the concept of travelling from border to border.

The term originally referred to the carrier business within smuggling operations across the Uganda Kenya border in the 1980s and early 1990s. The carriers either walked, used bicycles or motorcycles across the border. It was the carrier business that was locally referred to as boda boda meaning border to border. The rider carriers were known to be very fast and expert riders. Soon enough some people in the bicycle transport business labeled their bicycles with writing boda boda as a proud badge for being fast expert riders. When one wanted a fast ride or delivery they hired a boda to boda rider and the public started referring to them as boda-boda. That is how initially the bicycle transport got the name boda boda. When the motorcycles entered the smuggling and transport businesses they out competed bicycles because of their speed, endurance and potential for distance and thus retained the label boda-boda which was synonymous with fast riders.

== Number in operation ==
While there is no doubt boda bodas are commonplace in East African cities like Kampala and Nairobi, estimates of their number vary.

=== Dar es Salaam ===
Figures show a substantial increase (nearly 10,000%) of motorcycle imports to Tanzania from 2003 to 2015.

=== Kampala ===
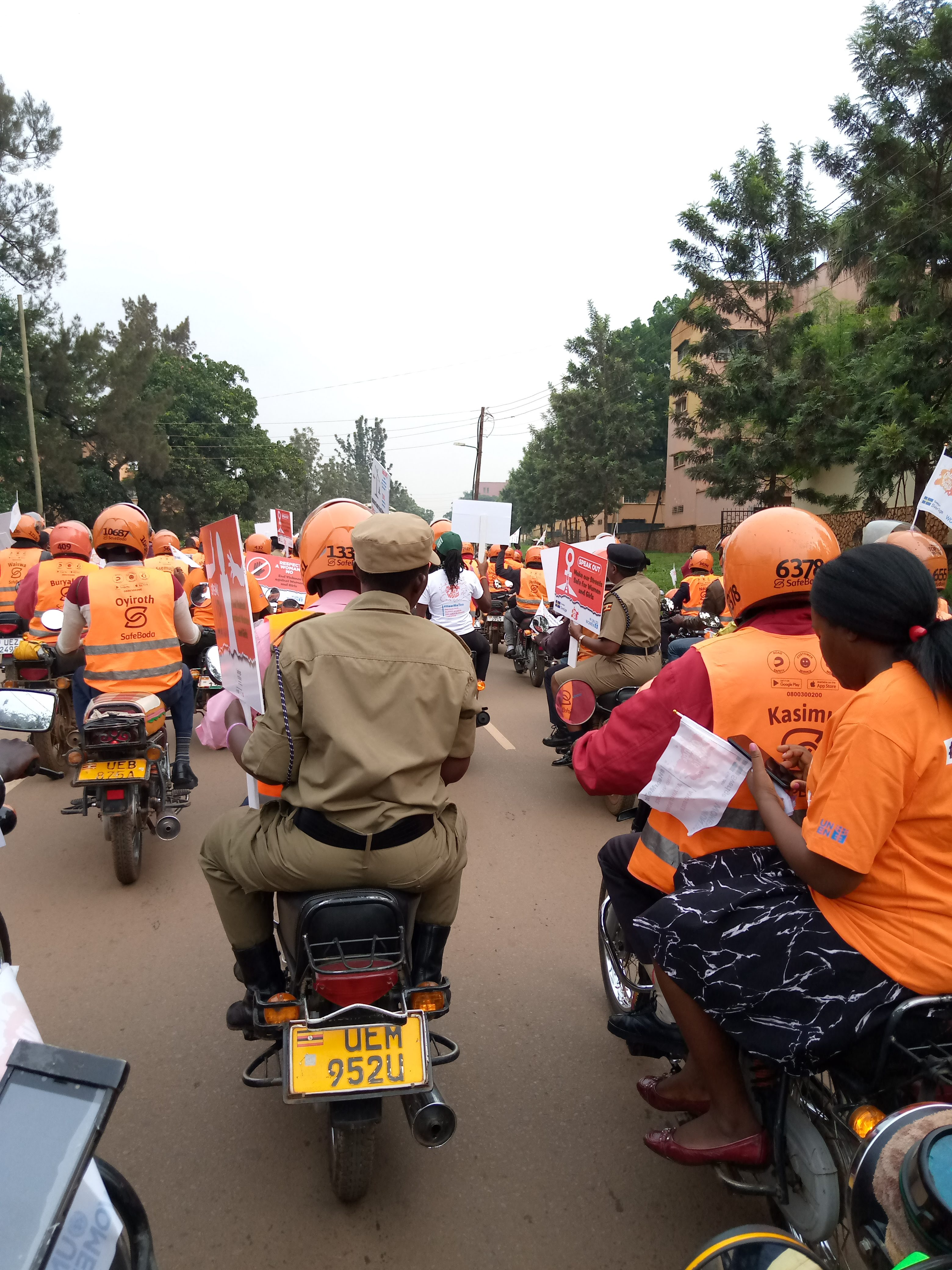
Boda bodas in Kampala

In 2013, one source claims 300,000 were operating in Kampala, Uganda. Data from the Kampala Capital City Authority show 120,000 registered motorcycles in the city around the same time although the number of boda bodas could be higher as some are unregistered according to a representative of the Kampala Boda-boda Riders Association. The same source indicated in 2015 that around 40,000 were operating in central Kampala. Another knowledgeable source suggested in 2015 that the true figure is closer to double that number.

Across Uganda riding boda bodas has become a source of income for many youths, providing livelihood to thousands of families in the country. In Kampala, the business has attracted tour and travel investors with one company 'Uganda Adventure Safaris and Boda Boda Tours' providing city maneuver as one of their tour packages for many visitors and tourists in Kampala.

=== Kigali ===
Unlike in most other cities, motorcycle taxi drivers in Kigali, Rwanda, are generally registered and considered law-abiding. Here, the preferred term for this form of transport is moto.

=== Kenya ===
As at 2024, Kenya had over 1.4 million registered bodabodas in the entire country. The figure was projected to rise as it's part of the easiest solutions people tend to take to create jobs or earn a living tackling the high unemployment rates and high costs of living. The number of riders, however, was estimated at over 1.8 million, meaning that a good number of riders share motorcycles. Regulation on this sector is insignificant with many citizens calling on the government to have a mechanism in place to curb the lawlessness and lack of training many bodaboda riders have, as they are prone to flaunting traffic rules.

== Potential shift from Boda Boda to bicycles for sustainability reasons ==
In a study conducted in Mukono, Uganda among students, researchers determined that four factors have possible implications for bicycling. These factors were: the transport system and safety factors, the natural environmental factors, the perceptions of cycling that an individual has, and the demographic characteristics of said individual. A logistic model of the factors likely to cause commuters to change modes to bicycles also highlighted mainly demographic characteristics (age, gender, and the individual's ability to cycle) as predictors of the individual's shift in mode to bicycles. These findings suggested that transport system improvements that could reduce the perceived risks of cycling, could perhaps have some of the greatest benefits to cycling in Uganda.

== Ridesharing services ==
=== SafeBoda ===
SafeBoda is a ridesharing company for motorcycle taxis providing safe and efficient boda boda rides for those in need of quick travel across several cities in Africa. The startup was founded in November 2014 in Uganda, where over 80,000 boda boda drivers were in the capital, Kampala.

=== Safe Motos ===
SafeMotos was launched in Kigali, Rwanda and has expanded to the Democratic Republic of the Congo.

=== Bolt ===
Bolt launched boda boda ridesharing services in Uganda to complement its e-taxi services. It has however suffered criticisms about poor service delivery and threatened the termination of their services in February 2019.

=== Uber Boda ===
Uber also added their e-boda services in Uganda in March 2018 and operates in Kampala.

== Gallery ==
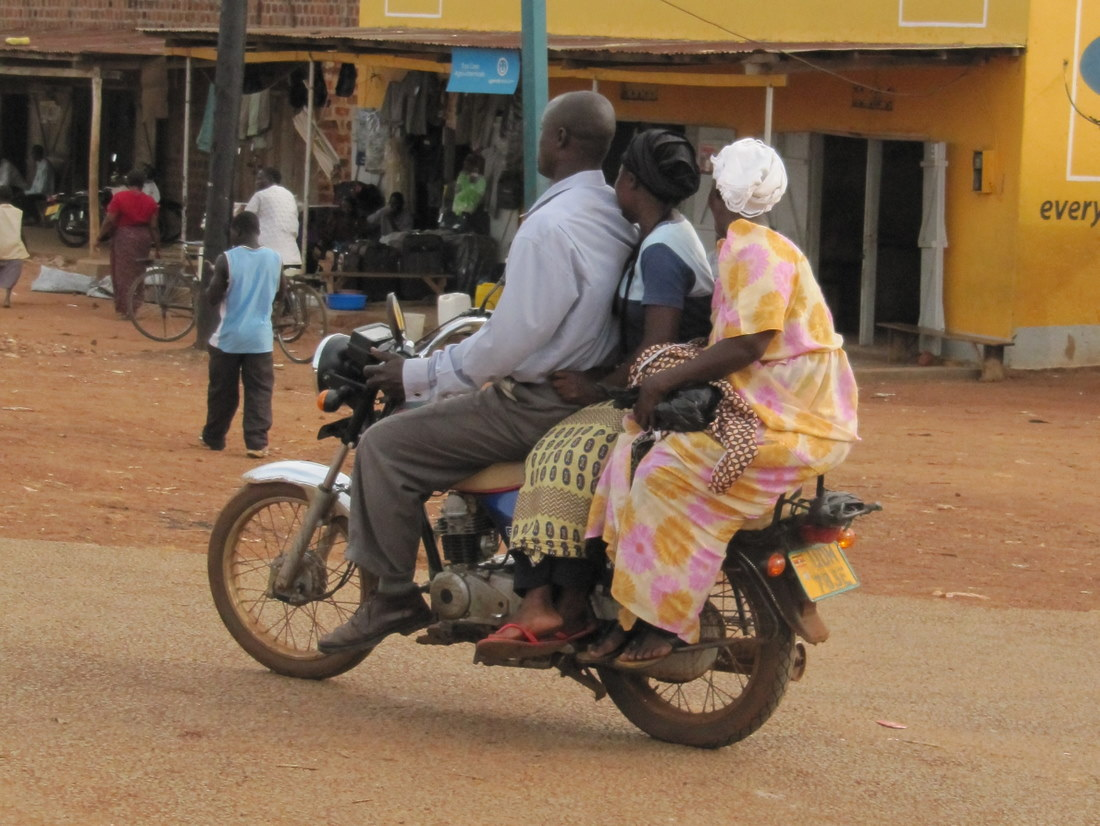
Along A109 Road, between Jinja and Malaba in Uganda

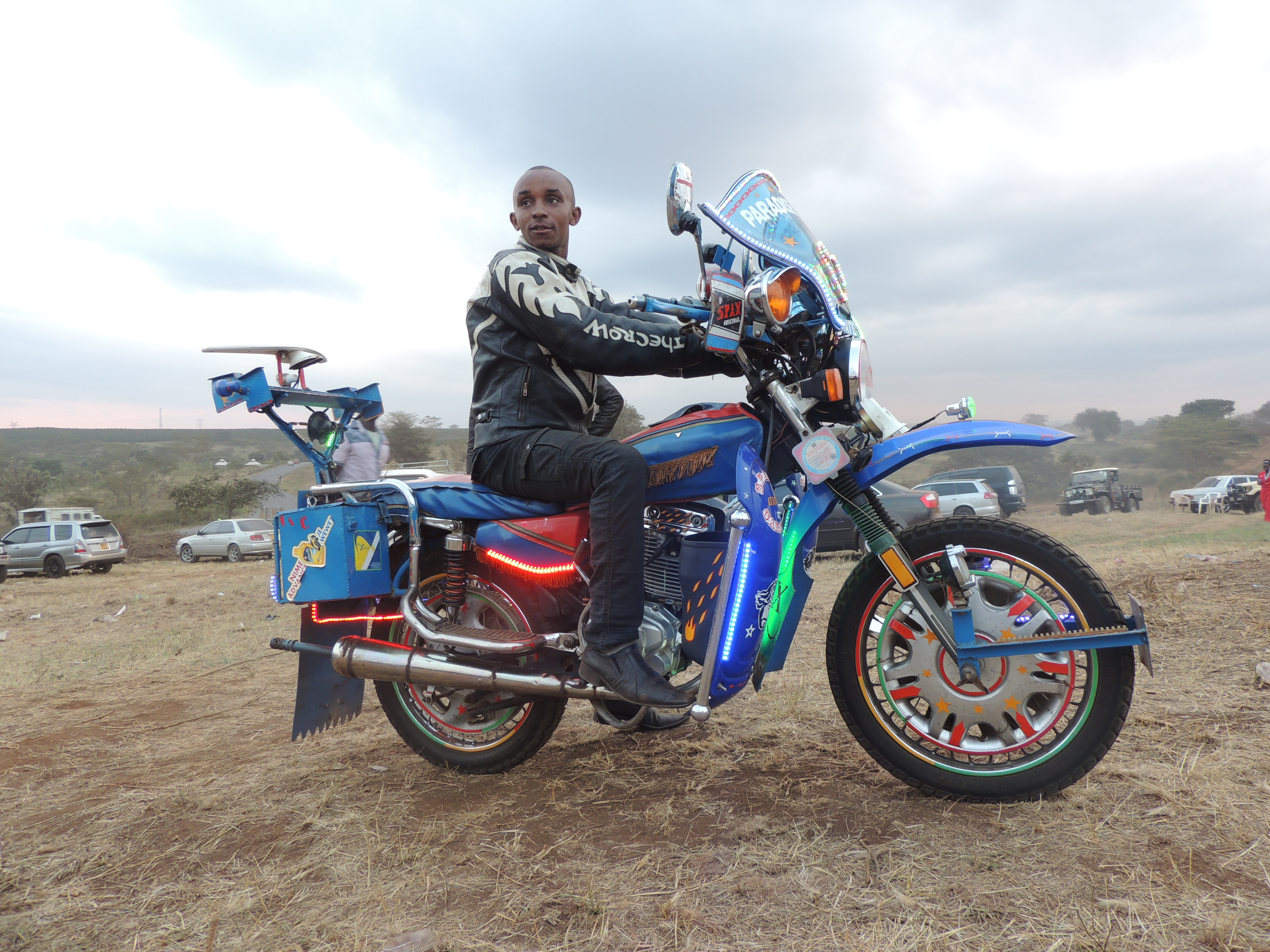
Customized motorcycle boda boda in Kenya

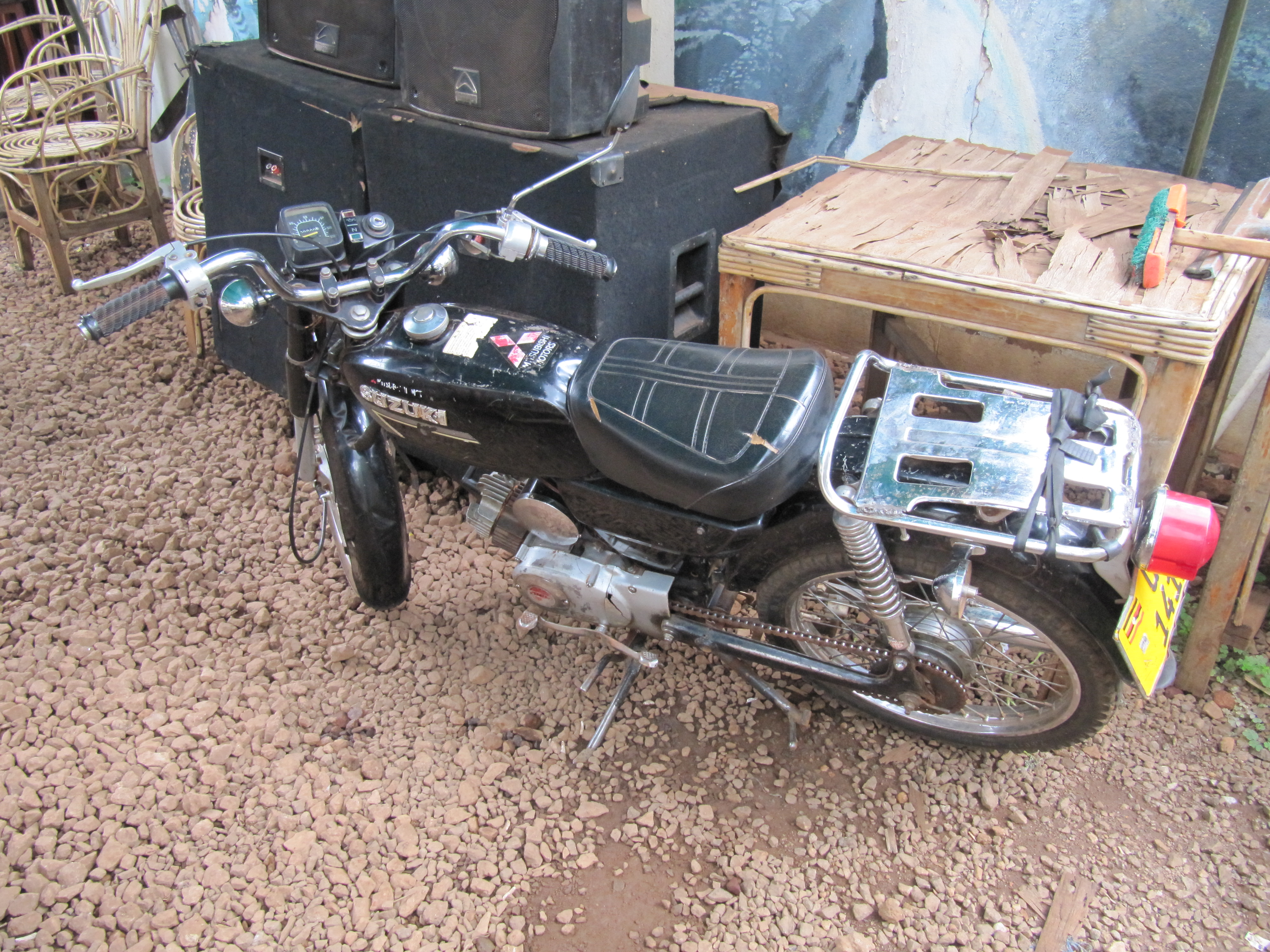

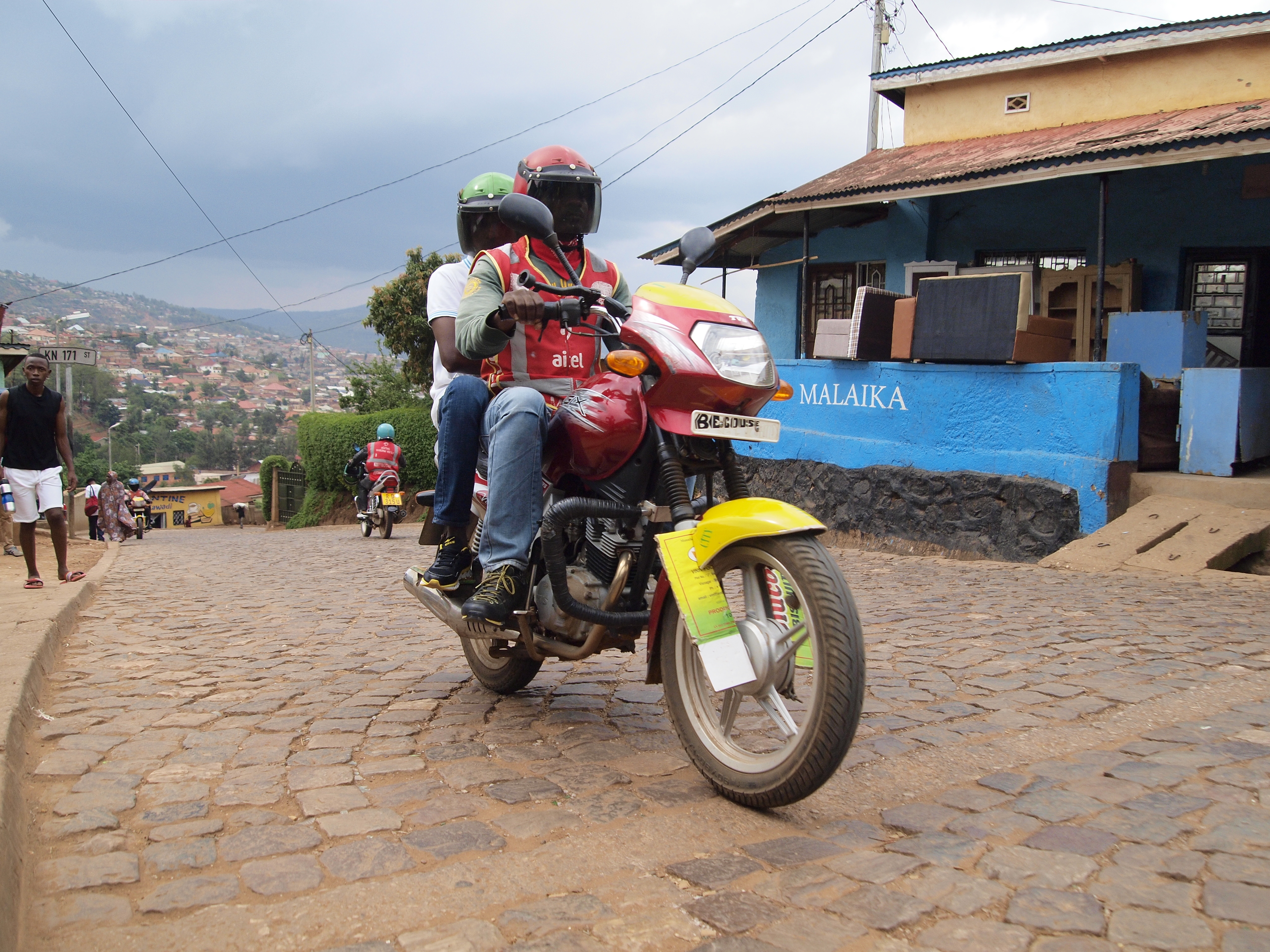
Boda boda in Rwanda

== See also ==
- Okada (motorcycle taxi)
