= Total E&P Uganda =

TotalEnergies EP Uganda
- Type: Subsidiary of a Public limited company
- Industry: Oil and gas exploration
- Founded: 2010
- Headquarters: Kampala, Uganda
- Key people: Loic Laurande (chief executive officer); Adewale Fayemi (general manager)
- Products: Oil and natural gas
- Parent: Total S.A.
- Website: Homepage

TotalEnergies EP Uganda (TEPU) is an oil and gas exploration company in Uganda. It is a subsidiary of TotalEnergies SA, the multinational oil, gas, and petrochemical conglomerate headquartered in Paris, France. It is separate from another Ugandan subsidiary, TotalEnergies M&S Uganda, which is responsible for marketing and services and has been in the country since 1955.

== Location ==
The headquarters of TEPU are located on the 5th Floor, Course View Towers, at 21 Yusuf Lule Road, in Kampala, Uganda's capital and largest city.

== History ==
TEPU was founded in 2010. It began operations on 21 February 2012 when Tullow Oil completed a farm down of two thirds of its interests to Total S.A. and CNOOC for US$2.9 billion.

TEPU, along with partner CNOOC, continues to work with the Ugandan government on the development plan for the Albertine Grabben, which will include an oil refinery in Uganda and an export crude oil pipeline.

== Operations ==
Total E&P Uganda (TEPU) is working in Exploration Area 1 (EA-1) and Exploration Area 1A (EA-1A) within the Albertine Region, Lake Albert. A significant portion of these areas lie within the confines of Murchison Falls National Park. TEPU s playing a leading role in coordinating the planning and execution of the export crude oil pipeline from Lake Albert to the Indian Ocean coast. On 30 August 2016, TEPU was awarded three production licenses by the government of Uganda. This paved the way for the final investment decision within the following 18 months by TEPU and its partners, with field oil expected in 2020.

In March 2018, TEPU, in collaboration with the German Cooperation Agency (GIZ), hired Q-Sourcing, a project management and human resource company, to carry out advanced welding training for the first 200 specialist welders destined to work on the Uganda Oil Refinery and the East African Crude Oil Pipeline, in which Total SA maintained shareholding.

In June 2021, TEPU awarded contracts worth US$1.9 billion to five subcontractor companies, to perform further work in the Tilenga Area of the Albertine Graben, in preparation for the first commercial oil expected in 2025. In August 2022, the first of three oil rigs ordered by Total Energies, named ZPEB Rig 1501, underwent successful stress testing at the manufacturing plant in China. Shipment from China to Buliisa and finally to the Tilenga drilling area was expected to take three months.

== Philanthropy ==
In November 2015, following the outbreak of cholera along the landing sites of the eastern shores of Lake Albert, TEPU donated an assortment of medical supplies to the districts of Buliisa, Hoima, and Masindi to assist in the fight against the epidemic. The donated items included 600 disposable gowns, gum boots, bottles of antiseptic scrub, disinfectant, intravenous fluids, and disposable gloves. The local health officer pointed out that the ultimate solution was to improve sanitation amongst the fishing villages.

== See also ==
- Uganda Oil Refinery
- Uganda National Oil Company
- Uganda-Tanzania Crude Oil Pipeline
- Uganda-Kenya Crude Oil Pipeline
