= Helios Investment Partners =

London-based investment firm

- Type: African focused private investments
- Industry: Private equity Venture capital
- Founded: 2004
- Founders: Babatunde Soyoye; Tope Lawani
- Headquarters: London, United Kingdom
- Key people: Luciana Germinario; Nitin Kaul; Paul Cunningham (CFO); Nimit Shah; Henry Obi
- Website: Homepage

Helios Investment Partners is a private equity investing firm operating in Africa and based in London, United Kingdom, with additional offices in Nairobi, Kenya and Lagos, Nigeria.

== History ==
Helios Investment Partners was established in 2004 by Babatunde Soyoye and Tope Lawani. The company operates a range of funds valued at more than $3 billion in capital commitments. These investments include start ups, growth equity investments, listed companies and large scale leveraged acquisitions across the continent of Africa.

The firm operates in sectors such as telecommunications, media, financial services, power, utilities, travel, leisure, distribution, fast-moving consumer goods, logistics and Agro–allied sectors.

== Portfolio ==
=== Current investments ===
Helios Investment Partners portfolio investments include but are not limited to the following:

Number	Investment	Industry	Ownership	Head office
1	Africa Oil Corp	Oil and Gas	12.4%	Vancouver, Canada
2	Africatel	Telecommunication	22.0%	Lisbon, Portugal
3	Afsat Communications	ICT	55.0%	Nairobi, Kenya
4	ARM Pension Managers	Financial Services	-	Lagos, Nigeria
5	Bayport Management Limited	Financial Services	23.4%	Ebene, Mauritius
6	Continental Outdoor Media	Outdoor Advertising	68.8%	Bryanston, South Africa
7	Eland Oil & Gas	Oil and Gas	29.36%	Aberdeen, Scotland, United Kingdom
8	Fawry	Financial Services	40%	Cairo, Egypt
9	First City Monument Bank	Financial Services	16.0%	Lagos, Nigeria
10	Flamingo Holdings	Horticulture	8.5%	Nairobi, Kenya
11	Helios Towers Limited	Telecommunication	28.6%	London, United Kingdom
12	Helios Towers Nigeria Limited	Telecommunication	22.5%	Lagos, Nigeria
13	Impact Oil & Gas Limited	Oil and Gas	13.6%	Woking, United Kingdom
14	Interswitch Limited	Financial Services	52.0%	Lagos, Nigeria
15	Petrobras International Braspetro B.V.	Oil and Gas	-	Rotterdam, Netherlands
16	Wananchi Group Holdings	ICT	-	Nairobi, Kenya

=== Exited Investments ===
- Equity Group Holdings – Nairobi, Kenya – 24.99% Shareholding
- Telkom Kenya Limited – Nairobi, Kenya – 60% Shareholding
- Vivo Energy – 40% Shareholding
