= Unga Group =

Unga Group Plc
- Type: Public; KN: UNGA
- Founded: 1908; 118 years ago
- Headquarters: Nairobi, Kenya
- Key people: Isabella Ochola-Wilson (chairperson of the board); James Nyutu (group CEO)
- Products: Animal feeds, maize and wheat products
- Revenue: ▲KES: 18.5 billion (2015)
- Net income: ▲KES: 635 million (2015)
- Total assets: ▲KES: 8.67 billion (2015)
- Total equity: ▲KES: 5.35 billion (2015)
- Website: Homepage

Unga Group Plc is a Kenyan-based holding company with investments in the business of flour milling and manufacturing of human nutrition products and animal feeds. The group has operations in Kenya and Uganda.

== Overview ==
Unga Group was founded in 1908, making it one of Kenya's oldest companies. The group's headquarters are in Nairobi, with flour mills in Eldoret, Nakuru and Mombasa.

In 2000, Unga Group was in losses and entered into a strategic investment partnership with Seaboard Corporation to form Unga Holding Limited as part of its recovery strategy. Unga Group's operations were all transferred to the newly created subsidiary. Seaboard Corporation brought on board capital and technical expertise.

Unga Group re-entered the bread market in 2015 through its acquisition of Ennsvalley Bakery. This move was aimed to diversify the group's investments. This acquisition was funded by the proceeds the group earned from the sale its 51% stake in Bullpak, the group's paper packaging subsidiary, to South African-based Nampak.

== Member companies ==
The companies that compose Unga Group include and are not limited to:

- Unga Investments Limited – 100% shareholding – This is the group's investment holding company.
- Unga Holdings Limited – 65% shareholding – Held through Unga Investments Limited. This is the holding company of all of the group's operating subsidiaries.
- Unga Limited – Nairobi, Kenya – 100% shareholding – Milling of maize and wheat for human consumption. Held through Unga Holdings Limited.
- Unga Farm Care (East Africa) Limited – Nairobi, Kenya – 100% shareholding – Manufacture of animal nutrition products and distribution of animal health products. Held through Unga Holdings Limited.
- Unga Millers (U) Limited – Kampala, Uganda – 100% shareholding – Milling of maize and wheat for human consumption and the distribution of animal health products. Held through Unga Holdings Limited.
- Ennsvalley Bakery Limited – Nairobi, Kenya – 52% shareholding – Baking and sale of cakes, bread and pastries. Held through Unga Holdings Limited.

== Shareholding ==
The shares of the stock of Unga Group Limited are traded on the main market segment of the Nairobi Securities Exchange, under the symbol UNGA. As of 30 June 2015, the shareholding in the group's stock was as depicted in the table below:

Unga Group Limited stock ownership
Rank	Name of owner	Percentage ownership
1	Victus Limited	50.93
2	Moses Thara	5.03
3	Rakesh Prakash Gadani	4.58
4	Other local & international investors	39.46
	Total	100.00

The group's largest shareholder, Victus Limited, is associated with First Chartered Securities, a Kenyan investment company with interest in real estate, banking, farming and insurance.

== Governance ==
Unga Group is governed by a nine-person board of directors, with Isabella Ochola-Wilson serving as chairperson and Nicholas Hutchinson as chief executive officer.
