= OLA Energy =

Libyan petroleum retail brand

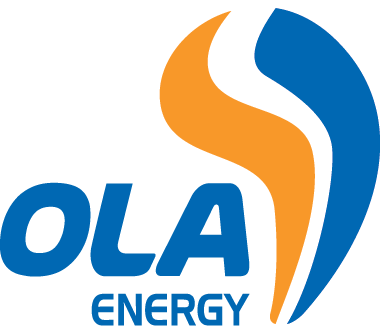
- Industry: Oil and Gas
- Predecessor: Oilibya
- Founded: November 2018
- Headquarters: Dubai, United Arab Emirates
- Area served: Africa
- Parent: Libyan African Portfolio
- Website: https://olaenergy.com/

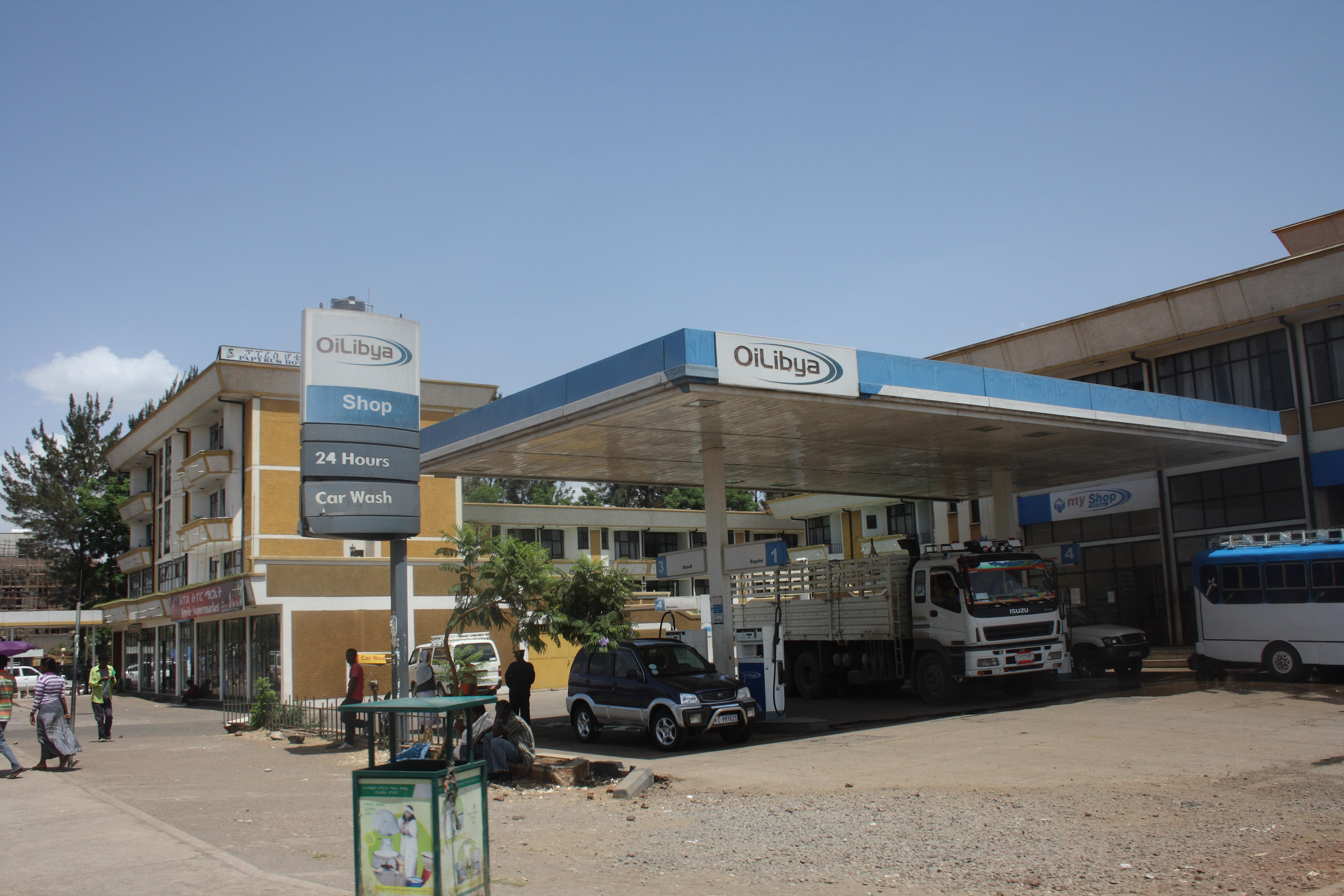
An OiLibya gas station in Ethiopia

OLA Energy is the brand name used by the African affiliates owned by OLA Energy Holdings Ltd (formerly Libya Oil Holdings Ltd). The brand name replaced the company's previous brand name, OiLibya, in 2018.

OLA Energy has over 3000 branches in 17 countries across Africa, including Egypt, Senegal, Ivory Coast, Cameroon, Gabon, Kenya, Mali, Burkina Faso, Niger, Chad, Eritrea, Uganda, Réunion, Morocco, Tunisia, Ethiopia, and Sudan.

== Services and products ==
- Fuels
- Lubricants
- LPG
- Industrial & wholesale
- Supply & trading
- Retail
- Aviation
- Marine

== Expansion ==
Between 2000 and 2004: Decision to incorporate 4 subsidiaries in Chad, Niger, Mali, and Burkina Faso.

Then between 2004 and 2008, acquisition of 5 Shell affiliates in Niger, Chad, Djibouti, Ethiopia and Sudan and 9 ExxonMobil affiliates in Niger, Senegal, Cote d'Ivoire, Gabon, Cameroon, Kenya, Reunion, Tunisia and Morocco.

=== Subsidiaries and affiliates of OLA Energy ===
OLA Energy has 18 subsidiaries

Main consolidated subsidiaries

- Burkina Faso
- Cameroon
- Chad
- Egypt
- Eritrea
- Ethiopia
- Gabon
- Kenya
- Mali
- Morocco
- Niger
- Réunion
- Senegal
- Sudan
- Tunisia
- Uganda

== First Libyan Civil War ==
In February 2011, some African countries began to express concerns as to how the First Libyan Civil War might affect OiLibya and its outlets across the region. Of particular concern were the huge debts racked up by Libya's key enterprises.

== See also ==
- Libya Oil Holdings
