= Rubis (company) =

French storage and distribution company

Rubis SCA
- Type: Société en commandite par actions
- Traded as: Euronext Paris: RUI; CAC Mid 60 Component
- Industry: Storage and distribution
- Founded: 1990
- Founder: Gilles Gobin
- Headquarters: Paris, France
- Area served: Worldwide
- Key people: Gilles Gobin (Chairman)
- Revenue: €2.12 billion (2011)
- Operating income: €122.0 million (2011)
- Net income: €75.90 million (2011)
- Total assets: €1.76 billion (2011)
- Total equity: €838.9 million (2011)
- Website: www.rubis.fr

Rubis SCA is a France-based international company specialized in the storage, distribution and sale of petroleum, liquefied petroleum gas (LPG), food and chemical products. Rubis is market leader in France, Switzerland, Bermuda, Jamaica, Madagascar, Morocco, French Antilles-Guiana, Senegal the Channel Islands and Kenya. The company's business are carried on by a number of subsidiaries, including Coparef, Rubis Terminal, Vitogaz, Kelsey Gas Ltd, Lasfargaz, La Collette Terminal, among others.

== History ==
In 1990, Gilles Gobin founded Rubis Investment & Cie. In June 1992, it purchased and then merged with the investment company Penhoët to form Rubis. In April 1993 it acquired the hydrocarbons and chemicals storage company Compagnie Parisienne des Asphaltes (CPA), one of the leaders operators in the French market, which was later renamed Rubis Terminal. In August 1994, it took control of the LPG distributor Vitogaz. With the new owner, Vitogaz expanded internationally.

On January 12, 1995, the company was listed on the Euronext.

In October 2001, while continuing its international expansion, Rubis purchased oil-storing subsidiary Pétrofrance's Propétrol. In 2005, it purchased Shell's distributor of LPG and petroleum products in the West Indies and in French Guiana, SAGF, at a cost of 116 million euros. During the next years, it continued the acquisition of other Shell's operations in Europe, Africa and America. In October 2006, Rubis and BP formed Frangaz, a 50:50 joint venture, to distribute liquified petroleum gas fuel in France.

In 2010, Rubis acquired the 50 percent of BP in Frangaz. That same year, it purchased the activities of Chevron in the Caribbean. During the next years it also acquired the downstream operations of the company in the region. On 16 November 2010, it took control of BP operations in Spain and sealed a long-term agreement with that company.

In January 2012, it acquired a 50 percent stake in the Turkish company Delta Petrol. In July 2012, it announced the selling of the LPG operations in Senegal and Czech Republic. In Jamaica, Rubis acquired the assets of Shell in January 2013 ending its 90-year dominance there.

== Divisions ==
=== Rubis Terminal ===
It centers on industrial liquid storage activities for international clients. It includes petroleum, chemicals and food products.

=== Rubis Energie ===
It specializes in the distribution of petroleum products, mainly LPG. They are sold as bottled gas or in bulk under the Vitogaz brand.
