= National Oil Corporation of Kenya =

State corporation of Kenya

Coordinates: 1.3250°S 36.8319°E

- Type: Parastatal
- Industry: Petroleum industry
- Founded: 1981
- Key people: Kiraitu Murungi E.G.H; Chairman; Leparan Gideon Morintat; CEO
- Products: petroleum, oil, gas
- Website: https://nationaloil.co.ke/

The National Oil Corporation of Kenya (NOCK), is a state corporation of Kenya founded by Act of Parliament in 1981, with a mandate of participating in all aspects of the Kenyan petroleum industry. The company was incorporated in 1981 and began operations in 1984.

== Location ==
The Head Office of the company is located at KAWI House, South C Red Cross Road, off Popo Road, Nairobi, Kenya's capital and largest city.

== Service stations ==
As of August 2018, NOCK operates 155 retail stations across Kenya, up from 115 in May 2017.

== Controversy ==
In January 2016, following a company loss of KSh270 million (about US$2.7 million) for the half year period from 1 July 2015 to 31 December 2015, the NOCK board of directors sent the then managing director, Sumayya Hassan-Athmani, on compulsory leave, pending a forensic audit of the company finances. She was re-instated "three weeks later", pending the forensic audit. However, she chose to resign effective 1 July 2016. Mwangi, a holder of Master of Business Administration degree from the University of Nairobi, was confirmed as the chief executive officer at National Oil, effective 1 August 2017.
