= Vivo Energy =

British downstream petroleum company

Vivo Energy plc
- Type: Private company
- Industry: Oil and gas
- Founded: 2011
- Headquarters: London, UK
- Area served: Africa
- Key people: Stan Mittelman, CEO
- Services: Fuel stations
- Revenue: ▲US$ 8,458 million (2021)
- Operating income: ▲US$ 312 million (2021)
- Net income: ▲US$ 152 million (2021)
- Owner: Vitol Group
- Number of employees: 2,700 (2022)
- Website: Vivo Energy

Vivo Energy is a British downstream petroleum company with its headquarters in London. It maintains subsidiaries and operations in 23 countries across Africa that encompass the supply, storage, distribution, and retail of a range of petroleum products. Vivo Energy is a Shell and Engen Petroleum licensee and sources, distributes, markets and supplies fuels and lubricants. It was listed on the London Stock Exchange and the Johannesburg Stock Exchange and was a constituent of the FTSE 250 Index and of the JSE All Share Index until it was acquired by Vitol Group in July 2022.

== History ==
Vivo Energy was established in 2011, as a partnership between Vitol Group, a Swiss-based Dutch-owned multinational energy and commodity trading company, and Helios Investment Partners, a United Kingdom-based private equity firm, with the objective to purchase majority shares in the downstream fuels business of Shell in Africa for approximately $1 billion.

Cape Verde, Senegal, Madagascar, Mali, Mauritius, Morocco, Tunisia joined Vivo Energy in December 2011. They were followed by Burkina Faso, Côte d'Ivoire, Guinea in February 2012; Botswana and Namibia in October 2012; Kenya in November 2012; Uganda in February 2013, Ghana in August 2013 and Mozambique in August 2013.

Vivo Energy had its initial public offering in May 2018 that saw its shares listed on the London Stock Exchange with a secondary listing on the Johannesburg Stock Exchange. This IPO was the largest in the LSE in 2018 and saw the founding shareholders, Vitol and Helios, raise GBP 548 million.

Until spring 2019 Vivo Energy was a Shell licensee operating in 16 African markets: Botswana, Burkina Faso, Cape Verde, Ghana, Guinea, Ivory Coast, Kenya, Madagascar, Mali, Mauritius, Morocco, Mozambique, Namibia, Senegal, Tunisia and Uganda. However, in March 2019, Vivo Energy completed a transaction with Engen Petroleum, adding eight new countries and 230 Engen-branded service stations to its network. The new markets for Vivo Energy were Gabon, Malawi, Mozambique, Réunion, Rwanda, Tanzania, Zambia and Zimbabwe; accordingly Vivo operates in 23 countries.

In July 2022, Vitol Group secured approval from the relevant regulatory and anti-trust bodies to acquire the company.

In October 2023, Vivo Energy acquired the liquid petroleum gas company, Somagaz, which operates in the Indian Ocean.

== Operations ==
As of 31 December 2021, the company operates 2,463 service stations across its markets.
