= PS Lugard II =

History
- Name: PS Lugard II
- Namesake: Frederick Lugard, 1st Baron Lugard
- Operator: Kenya and Uganda Railways and Harbours (1946–48); East African Railways and Harbours Corporation (1948–67)
- Route: on the Albert Nile between Pakwach in Uganda and Nimule in Sudan
- Builder: Fleming and Ferguson, Paisley, Scotland
- Yard number: 731
- Completed: 1946
- Out of service: 1967

General characteristics
- Type: Paddle steamer as a passenger ferry
- Tonnage: 350 GRT or 380 tons
- Length: 180 feet
- Beam: 33 feet
- Draught: Shallow draught
- Installed power: Steam
- Propulsion: side paddle wheel
- Capacity: 28 1st Class passengers / 20 2nd class passengers

PS Lugard II was a British passenger ferry in Uganda. She was a side wheel paddle steamer with a shallow draught in order to operate on the Victoria Nile and Albert Nile. She was named after Frederick Lugard, 1st Baron Lugard, who late in the previous century had explored Uganda, secured much of it for the British Empire and served as its Military Administrator 1890–92.

Kenya and Uganda Railways and Harbours (KURH) ordered Lugard II to replace its only side wheel paddle steamer, PS Lugard, that had been in service since 1927. Fleming and Ferguson of Paisley in Renfrewshire, Scotland built Lugard II in 1946. She was delivered via Kisumu in Kenya. Therefore, she would have been a "knock down" vessel; Lake Albert

that is, she was bolted together in the shipyard at Paisley, all the parts marked with numbers, disassembled into many hundreds of parts and transported in kit form by sea to Mombasa and then by rail as far as Kisumu.

== Operational history ==
Lugard II operated on the Albert Nile between Pakwach and the border town of Nimule in Sudan. Her capacity was supplemented by pushing a barge or lighter that provided third class accommodation as well as cargo space.

Lugard II connected at Pakwach with the KURH sternwheelers PS Speke (1910), PS Stanley (1913) and PS Grant (1925) that plied the Victoria Nile and Lake Kyoga until 1962. In that year KURH's successor, the East African Railways and Harbours Corporation (EAR&H), opened its northern Uganda branch line from Tororo to Pakwach, giving a new connection with Lugard II's Albert Nile service and superseding the Victoria Nile ferries.

Lugard II was herself withdrawn from service a few years later, and in 1967 EARH offered her for sale.
