= Panyimur =

Settlement in Uganda

- Location in Uganda
- Coordinates: 02°17′43″N 31°20′46″E
- Country: Uganda
- Region: Northern Region of Uganda
- Sub-region: West Nile sub-region
- District: Pakwach District

Government
  - Mayor: Peters Openjtho
- Elevation: 2,028 ft (618 m)

Panyimur is a town in the Pakwach District of the Northern Region of Uganda. Panyimur may also refer to Panyimur sub-county, one of the five administrative subdivisions that constitute Pakwach District.

== Location ==
Panyimur is located in the West Nile sub-region, along the northwestern shores of Lake Albert (Africa). This is about 28 kilometres (17 mi) south-west of Pakwach, the location of the district headquarters. This is approximately 128 kilometres (80 mi), by road, south-east of Arua, the largest city in the West Nile sub-region.

== Population ==
During the August 2014 national population census, the population of Panyimur sub-county was enumerated at 43,366 inhabitants, of whom 21,111 (48.7 percent) were male and 22,255 (51.3 percent) were female. This was when the subcounty and the rest of Pakwach District were still part of Nebbi District.

== Overview ==
Before 2017, Pakwach District was part of Nebbi District. In that year, Jonam County was curved off to form the new district with five sub-counties and one town council; Pakwach Town Council.

A government-operated ferry connects the lakeside town of Wanseko, in Buliisa District on the eastern shores of Lake Albert to Panyimur, in Pakwach District, on the western shores of the same lake. This cross-lake link allows for passage of people and goods between the Western and the Northern Regions of Uganda, parts of South Sudan and the northeastern parts of the Democratic Republic of the Congo. Goods that are exchanged include wood and fish from Buliisa District.

Panyimur is the location of Panyimur Fish Market, built between 2013 and 2019 at a cost of Ush 1.4 billion (approx. US$380,000), with financial assistance from the embassy of Iceland to Uganda. The fish market is prone to flooding, as happened in 2020.

The Panyimur Hot Springs, also known locally as the Amoropii Hot Springs are a natural hot springs site, located about 3 kilometres (2 mi), outside Panyimur Town.

== See also ==
- List of cities and towns in Uganda
