= Kenya and Uganda Railways and Harbours =

- Company type: Government-owned corporation
- Predecessor: Uganda Railway
- Founded: 1926
- Defunct: 1948
- Fate: Merged with Tanganyika Railway
- Successor: East African Railways and Harbours Corporation

Kenya and Uganda Railways and Harbours (KURH) was a colonial entity (1926–1948) managing harbours, railways, ports like (Mombasa port and port bell), lake and river ferries in Kenya Colony and the Uganda Protectorate from 26 February 1926 until 1 May 1948. Mombasa was the primary deep-water seaport on the Indian Ocean where the original Uganda Railway construction began in 1896. The railway linked the interior to the open sea at Mombasa's Kilindini Harbour. It included the Uganda Railway, which it extended from Nakuru to Kampala in 1931. In the same year it built a branch line to Mount Kenya. It was originally constructed to secure British interests in the Nile valley and create access to Uganda, a landlocked country rich in resources and minerals.The railway network was integrated with inland shipping services on Lake Victoria, Lake Kyoga, and Lake Albert, utilizing several inland ports and piers. Disassembled ferries were transported by rail to the lakeside for reassemble. Uganda had some ports that served as key points in the building of the railway network such as Kisumu Port which is formerly known as Port Florence, the main railway line reached the port in 1901. From here the ferry services connected to other ports around the lake. Others ports are Port Bell, Jinja Pier, Butaiba Port and Namasagali Port. It was often called the "Lunatic Express". This was because of its immerse costs and the challenging terrain, involved bringing over 30,000 coolies from British India, man eaters(lions) at Tsavo in Tanzania.

After 1930 a new KURH steamer, the 860 tonne SS Robert Coryndon, established a fortnightly passenger and cargo service between Butiaba on Lake Albert and Kasenyi on Lake George. Sir Winston Churchill said she was "the best library afloat" and Ernest Hemingway called her "magnificence on water". In 1946 the 350-ton stern-wheel paddle steamer PS Lugard II replaced the old Uganda Railway steamer PS Lugard on the Albert Nile river service between Pakwach in Uganda and Nimule in Sudan.

In 1948 the East African High Commission was formed and KURH was merged with the railways of the Tanganyika Territory. The new East African Railways and Harbours Corporation provided rail, harbour and inland shipping services in all three territories until the High Commission's successor, the East African Community, was dissolved by its member states in 1977.
