= Hoima–Butiaba–Wanseko Road =

Ugandan road

Coordinates: 01°47′28″N 31°23′05″E

Route information
- Length: 69 mi (111 km)
- History: Designated in April 2018; Commissioned in January 2022.

Major junctions
- South end: Hoima
- Butiaba; Buliisa
- North end: Wanseko

Location
- Country: Uganda

Highway system
- Roads in Uganda

Hoima–Butiaba–Wanseko Road is a road in the Western Region of Uganda, connecting the city of Hoima and the towns of Butiaba, Buliisa, and Wanseko on the shores of Lake Albert. This is one of Uganda's critical oil roads because it facilitates oil exploration in the Albertine Graben, as well as tourism, due to its proximity to Kabalega National Park.

== Location ==
The road starts at Hoima, and continues northwest through Butiaba and Buliisa and ending in Wanseko, in the oil-rich Albertine Graben, a distance of approximately 111 kilometres (69 mi). The road connects the Buseruka Parish to Hoima, the largest city in the Bunyoro sub-region.

== Upgrading to bitumen ==
The government of Uganda has earmarked this road for upgrading through the conversion of the existing gravel road to bitumen surface and the building of bridges and drainage channels. Kolin Insaat, a construction firm from Turkey, was selected, with the approval of the cabinet of Uganda, to carry out the improvements at a projected cost of approximately US$140 million (UGX:454 billion). Construction was expected to start during the 2015/16 financial year (1 July 2015 - 30 June 2016), although the exact construction timeline had not been released as of June 2015.

Finally, the construction contract was awarded to Chongqing International Construction Corporation (CICO), for a contract price of US$179,538,545.59. The contract was signed in January 2018. Civil works began in April 2018. Completion was initially planned for April 2021. The COVID-19 pandemic interrupted construction, although completion is still expected in 2021.

In January 2022, the completed road was commissioned by Yoweri Museveni, the President of Uganda, in the presence of Robinah Nabbanja, the Prime Minister of Uganda and Allen Kagina, the Executive Director of Uganda National Roads Authority.

== See also ==
- Hoima District
- Buliisa District
- Uganda Oil Refinery
- Economy of Uganda
- List of roads in Uganda
