= Masindi–Biso Road =

Ugandan road

Coordinates: 01°39′31″N 31°36′17″E

Route information
- Length: 32.3 mi (52.0 km)
- History: Designated in 2019; Expected completion in 2022

Major junctions
- East end: Masindi
- Nyamegita; Busingiro
- West end: Biso

Location
- Country: Uganda

Highway system
- Roads in Uganda

Masindi–Biso Road is a road in the Western Region of Uganda, connecting the city of Masindi, in Masindi District and the town of Biso, in Buliisa District in the oil-rich Albertine Graben.

== Location ==
The road starts at Masindi, the district capital and the largest city in Masindi District. It takes a general westerly direction, looping around the southern edges of Budongo Forest Reserve up to the settlement of Nyamegita, approximately 30 kilometres (19 mi) west of Masindi.

At Nyamegita, the road turns north-westwards, goes through the forest reserve and through the settlement of Busingiro to end at Biso, having traveled a total distance of 52 kilometres (32 mi).

== Overview ==
This road is one of 12 roads earmarked for development, and upgrade to class II bitumen surface, by the Ugandan government, in preparation for construction of (a) Uganda Oil Refinery (b) East African Crude Oil Pipeline and (c) Kabaale International Airport. All this activity is in preparation for Uganda's first oil, expected in 2023. The twelve roads are collectively referred to as the "Oil Roads".

== Upgrading to bitumen ==
The government of Uganda has earmarked this road and two other roads for upgrading through the conversion of the existing gravel road to bitumen surface and the building of bridges and drainage channels. China Railway Seventh Group has been contracted by the Uganda National Roads Authority (UNRA), to upgrade (a) Hohwa–Nyairongo–Kyarushesha–Butole Road (b) Kabaale–Kizirafumbi Road and (c) Masindi–Biso Road. The three roads are budgeted to cost USh504 billion (approx. US$137 million).

== Timeline and funding ==
The contractor agreed to start work in May 2019 and proceed for one year, without upfront payment. After one year, the government will pay for any completed work and pay for any subsequent work, as completed. In the meantime, the government is expected to search for a lender to fund the construction. Construction of all three roads is expected to last three years.

== See also ==
- Economy of Uganda
