= SS Robert Coryndon =

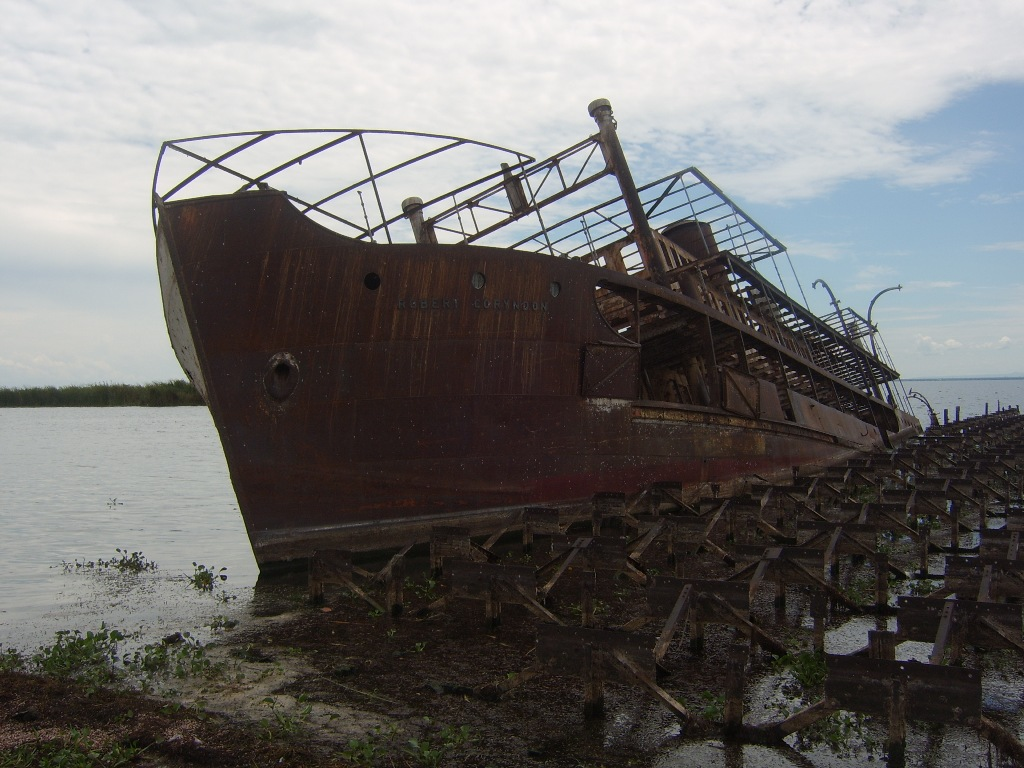
- Robert Coryndon's wreck in 2009

History
- Name: Robert Coryndon
- Namesake: Sir Robert Coryndon, Governor of Uganda 1918–22
- Operator: Kenya and Uganda Railways and Harbours (1930–48); East African Railways and Harbours Corporation (1948–67)
- Route: fortnightly between Butiaba on Lake Albert and Kasenyi on Lake George
- Builder: J.I. Thornycroft & Co, Woolston, England
- Yard number: 1086
- Launched: September 1929
- In service: 1930
- Fate: Sank 1962

General characteristics
- Type: Passenger & cargo ferry
- Tonnage: 860 tons
- Propulsion: Steam engine; twin screws

SS Robert Coryndon was a British twin-screw passenger and cargo ferry on Lake Albert in central Africa.

She was built in England in 1929 and reassembled in kit form at Lake Albert in 1930. She ran aground in 1962 and lay derelict until she was broken up for scrap between 2009 and 2012.

== Building ==
John I. Thornycroft & Company at Woolston, Hampshire built the ship for Kenya and Uganda Railways and Harbours in 1929–30. She was named after the South African Sir Robert Coryndon, who was Governor of Uganda 1918–22.

She was a "knock-down" ship. She was assembled in 1929 at Woolston, all her parts were marked with numbers, and she was then disassembled and the many hundreds of parts were transported in kit form to Africa, where she was reassembled on the shore of Lake Albert in 1930. Part of the overland journey to Lake Albert was by lorry, which severely limited the maximum size and weight of her parts.

Robert Coryndon was part of a plan for a network of railway, river steamer and lake steamer services linking British interests in Egypt, East Africa and southern Africa. Ernest Hemingway described her as "magnificence on water", and Sir Winston Churchill said she had "the best library afloat".

== Fate ==
Robert Coryndon sank in 1962 at Butiaba during a flood. She was not refloated. In 1967 the East African Railways and Harbours Corporation (EAR&H) offered her wreck for sale, but she remained largely intact in 2009. During 2012 the wreck was dismantled for scrap; early that year only her aft king posts remained visible above the water.
