= Wanseko =

- Map of Uganda showing the location of Wanseko; Placement on map is approximate.
- Coordinates: 02°10′40″N 31°22′50″E
- Country: Uganda
- Region: Western Uganda
- Sub-region: Bunyoro sub-region
- District: Buliisa District
- Elevation: 640 m (2,100 ft)
- Time zone: UTC+3 (EAT)

Wanseko, is a settlement in Western Uganda.

== Location ==
Wanseko is located on the eastern shores of Lake Albert, in Buliisa District. It lies approximately 15 kilometres (9.3 mi), by road, north of the district headquarters at Buliisa. This is about 104 kilometres (65 mi), by road, north of Hoima, the nearest large city. Wanseko is approximately 301 kilometres (187 mi), by road, northwest of Kampala, Uganda's capital and largest city. The settlement lies at the mouth of the Victoria Nile, at it enters Lake Albert. The coordinates of Wanseko are:2°10'40.0"N, 31°22'50.0"E (Latitude:2.177778; Longitude:31.380556).

== Overview ==
Wanseko lies within Bugungu Wildlife Reserve. It offers opportunity to view various species of exotic bird species. It also supports a small fishing community. The settlement is the northern end of the 111 kilometres (69 mi) Hoima–Butiaba–Wanseko Road. A government-funded transportation ferry crosses the mouth of the river from Wanseko in Buliisa District to Panyimur in Pakwach District, twice daily, six days a week, Mondays through Saturdays.

== See also ==
- Uganda Refinery
- Crude Oil Pipeline
