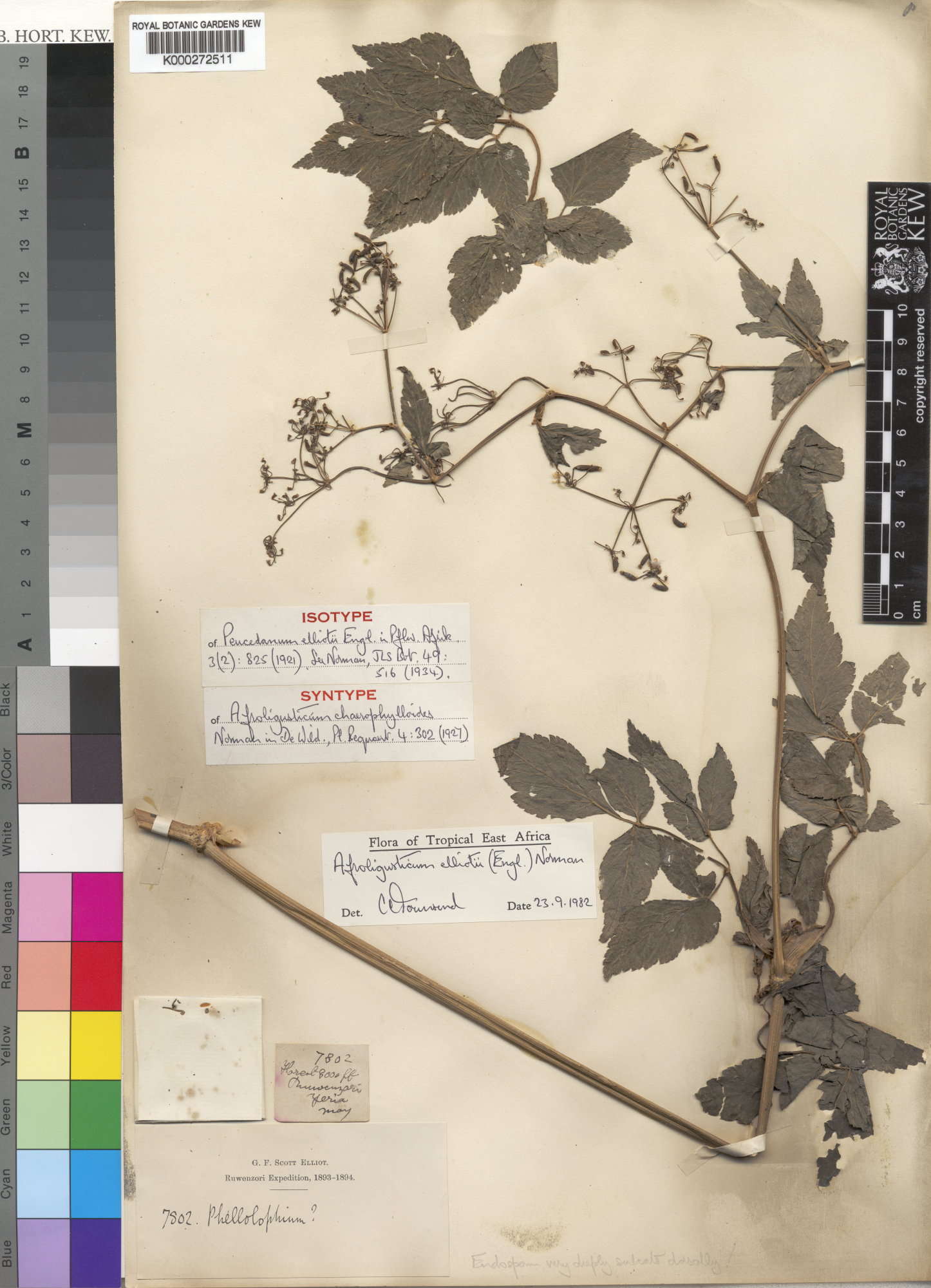

Conservation status
- Endangered (IUCN 3.1)

Scientific classification
- Kingdom: Plantae
- Clade: Tracheophytes
- Clade: Angiosperms
- Clade: Eudicots
- Clade: Asterids
- Order: Apiales
- Family: Apiaceae
- Genus: Afroligusticum
- Species: A. elliotii

Binomial name
- Afroligusticum elliotii (Engl.) C.Norman (1934)

Synonyms
- Peucedanum elliotii Engl. (1921); Afroligusticum chaerophylloides C.Norman (1927); Peucedanum normanii M.Hiroe (1979)

= Afroligusticum elliotii =

Species of flowering plant

Afroligusticum elliotii is a member of the carrot family, Apiaceae. It is a perennial tuber, native to bamboo forests in west Tropical Africa. An endangered species, A. elliotii is most commonly found near Lake Kivu in Rwanda, but it has been observed as far north as Lake Albert in Uganda and as far south as Lake Tanganyika in Tanzania.

Afroligusticum elliotii is the type species of the genus Afroligusticum, and was the sole species in the genus until a broad reclassification of African peucedanoids in 2008.

Afroligusticum elliotii grows between 0.5 and 1.3 meters high, and possesses small green flowers.
