= Biso (disambiguation) =

Biso may refer to:

- Biso, Bishop of Paderborn (887–923)
- Bise, a dry, warm wind in France and Switzerland
- Mattia Biso, Italian footballer
- BISO, BIstructural ISOtropic (coated fuel particle)
- Biso, Uganda, a town in the Western Region of the county
