= Afroligusticum =

Scientific classification
- Kingdom: Plantae
- Clade: Tracheophytes
- Clade: Angiosperms
- Clade: Eudicots
- Clade: Asterids
- Order: Apiales
- Family: Apiaceae
- Subfamily: Apioideae
- Tribe: Tordylieae
- Genus: Afroligusticum; C.Norman (1927)

Type species
- Afroligusticum elliotii

Genus of flowering plants

Afroligusticum is a genus of flowering plants belonging to the carrot family, Apiaceae.

Its native range is Tropical and Southern Africa.

Species:

- Afroligusticum aculeolatum (Engl.) P.J.D.Winter
- Afroligusticum claessensii (C.Norman) P.J.D.Winter
- Afroligusticum elgonense (H.Wolff) P.J.D.Winter
- Afroligusticum elliotii (Engl.) C.Norman
- Afroligusticum linderi (C.Norman) P.J.D.Winter
- Afroligusticum mattirolii (Chiov.) P.J.D.Winter
- Afroligusticum petitianum (A.Rich.) P.J.D.Winter
- Afroligusticum piovanii (Chiov.) Kljuykov & Zakharova
- Afroligusticum runssoricum (Engl.) P.J.D.Winter
- Afroligusticum scottianum (Engl.) P.J.D.Winter
- Afroligusticum thodei (T.H.Arnold) P.J.D.Winter
- Afroligusticum townsendii (Charpin & Fern.Casas) P.J.D.Winter
- Afroligusticum volkensii (Engl.) P.J.D.Winter
- Afroligusticum wilmsianum (H.Wolff) P.J.D.Winter
