= HMS Amaranthus =

1941 Flower-class corvette

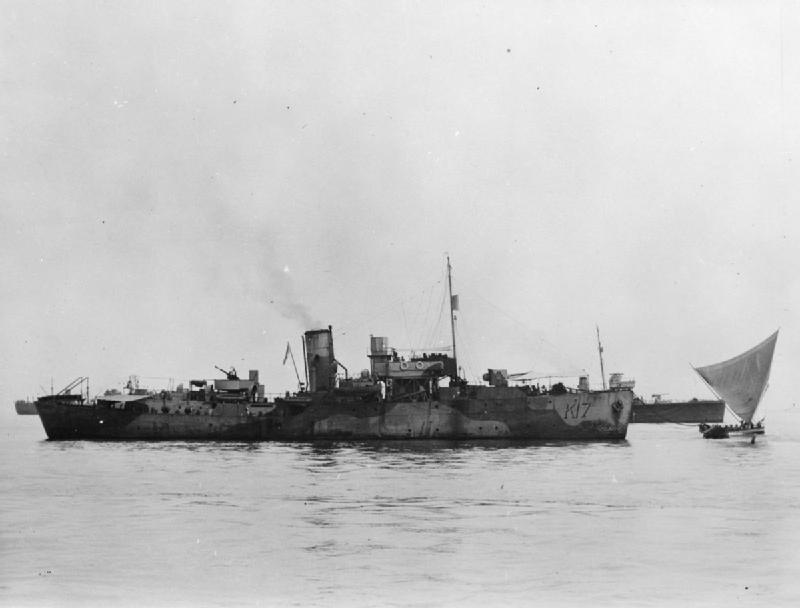
- HMS Amaranthus

History

United Kingdom
- Name: HMS Amaranthus
- Ordered: 21 September 1939
- Builder: Fleming & Ferguson, Paisley
- Laid down: 4 May 1940
- Launched: 17 October 1940
- Commissioned: 12 February 1941
- Decommissioned: 1946
- Identification: Pennant number: K17
- Fate: Sold in 1946. Broken up at Hong Kong in 1953.

General characteristics
- Class & type: Flower-class corvette
- Displacement: 925 long tons
- Length: 205 ft (62 m) o/a
- Beam: 33 ft (10 m)
- Draught: 11 ft 6 in (3.51 m)
- Propulsion: 1 × 4-cycle triple-expansion reciprocating steam engine; 2 × fire tube Scotch boilers; Single shaft; 2,750 ihp (2,050 kW)
- Speed: 16 kn (30 km/h)
- Range: 3,500 nmi (6,500 km) at 12 kn (22 km/h)
- Complement: 85
- Sensors & processing systems: 1 × SW1C or 2C radar; 1 × Type 123A or Type 127DV sonar
- Armament: 1 × BL 4-inch (101.6 mm) Mk.IX gun; 2 × Vickers .50 cal machine gun (twin); 2 × Lewis .303 cal machine gun (twin); 2 × Mk.II Depth charge throwers; 2 × Depth charge rails with 40 depth charges

Service record
- Commanders: Lt. Nicholas Bryan John Stapleton, RNR (January 1941 to August 1941); T/Lt. Walter Smith Thomson, RNR (August 1941 to June 1943); T/A/Lt.Cdr. William Godfrey Pardoe-Matthews, RNR (June 1943 to November 1944); T/A/Lt.Cdr. John Maurice Baldry, RNVR, (November 1944 to decommissioning)
- Operations: Battle of the Atlantic

HMS Amaranthus (K17) was a Flower-class corvette of the Royal Navy. She took part in the Second World War, being involved in escorting convoys from West Africa to the United Kingdom from May 1941 onwards.

== Design and construction ==
The Flower-class arose as a result of the Royal Navy's realisation in the late 1930s that it had a shortage of escort vessels, particularly coastal escorts for use on the East coast of Britain, as the likelihood of war with Germany increased. To meet this urgent requirement, a design developed based on the whale-catcher Southern Pride - this design was much more capable than Naval trawlers, but cheaper and quicker to build than the Hunt-class destroyers or Kingfisher-class sloops that were alternatives for the coastal escort role.

The early Flowers, such as Amaranthus were 205 feet 0 inches (62.48 m) long overall, 196 feet 0 inches (59.74 m) at the waterline and 190 feet 0 inches (57.91 m) between perpendiculars. Beam was 33 feet 0 inches (10.06 m) and draught was 14 feet 10 inches (4.52 m) aft. Displacement was about 940 long tons (960 t) standard and 1,170 long tons (1,190 t) full load. Two Admiralty Three-drum water tube boilers fed steam to a Vertical Triple Expansion Engine rated at 2,750 indicated horsepower (2,050 kW) which drove a single propeller shaft. This gave a speed of 16 knots (18 mph; 30 km/h). 200 tons of oil were carried, giving a range of 4,000 nautical miles (4,600 mi; 7,400 km) at 12 knots (14 mph; 22 km/h).

Design armament was a single BL 4-inch Mk IX naval gun forward and a single 2-pounder "pom-pom" anti-aircraft cannon aft, although the pom-poms were not available until 1941, so early ships were completed with improvised close-range anti aircraft armament such as Lewis guns or Vickers .50 machine guns instead.

Amaranthus was one of a group of ten Flower-class corvettes ordered by the Admiralty on 21 September 1939. The ship was laid down at the Scottish shipbuilder Fleming and Ferguson's Paisley shipyard as Yard number 563 on 4 May 1940. She was launched on 17 October 1940 and completed on 12 February 1941.
