= HMS Marazion =

Minesweeper of the Royal Navy

History

United Kingdom
- Name: HMS Marazion
- Builder: Fleming & Ferguson, Paisley
- Launched: 15 April 1919
- Fate: Sold in Hong Kong, March 1933

General characteristics
- Class & type: Hunt-class minesweeper, Aberdare sub-class
- Displacement: 710 long tons (720 t)
- Length: 231 ft (70 m)
- Beam: 28 ft (8.5 m)
- Draught: 8 ft (2.4 m)
- Installed power: 2,200 ihp (1,600 kW)
- Propulsion: 2 × vertical triple-expansion steam engines; Yarrow boilers; 2 × shafts
- Speed: 16 kn (18 mph; 30 km/h)
- Capacity: 140 short tons (130 t) coal
- Complement: 73 men
- Armament: 1 × QF 4-inch (102 mm) gun; 1 × 76 mm (3.0 in) gun; 2 × twin .303 in (7.7 mm) machine guns

HMS Marazion was a Hunt-class minesweeper launched by Fleming & Ferguson, Paisley, Yard No 453, on 15 April 1919 and sold in March 1933 in Hong Kong.

She acted as a submarine tender and was present at the sinking of Poseidon in 1931.

== See also ==
- Marazion, Cornwall
