= Biso, Uganda =

Biso
- Map of Uganda showing the location of Biso
- Coordinates: 01°45′40″N 31°25′06″E
- Country: Uganda
- Region: Western Region of Uganda
- District: Buliisa District
- Elevation: 1,004 m (3,294 ft)
- Time zone: UTC+3 (EAT)

Biso, also Biiso, is a town in the Western Region of Uganda. It is an urban center in the Buliisa District Administration. Biiso also refers to a sub-county in Uganda, where the town is located.

== Location ==
The town is located in Biiso sub-county, Buliisa District, in the Western Region of Uganda, approximately 44 kilometres (27 mi), south-west of Buliisa, where the district headquarters are located. Biso is about 50 kilometres (31 mi), by road, west of Masindi, the second largest city in Bunyoro sub-region.

The town lies at an average elevation of 1,004 metres (3,294 ft), above sea level. The geographical coordinates of Biso, Uganda are 01°45'40.0"N, 31°25'06.0"E (Latitude:1.761111; Longitude:31.418333).

== Population ==
The population of Biiso sub-county, where Biso town s located was enumerated at 17,047 people, during the 2014 national census and household survey.

== Overview ==
Biso is located on the alternate route from Masindi, the nearest large town to Murchison Falls National Park, via Buliisa Town, entering through the Bugungu Gate.

== See also ==
- List of cities and towns in Uganda
