= 2014 Lake Albert boat disaster =

Capsizing of a boat on Lake Albert in 2014

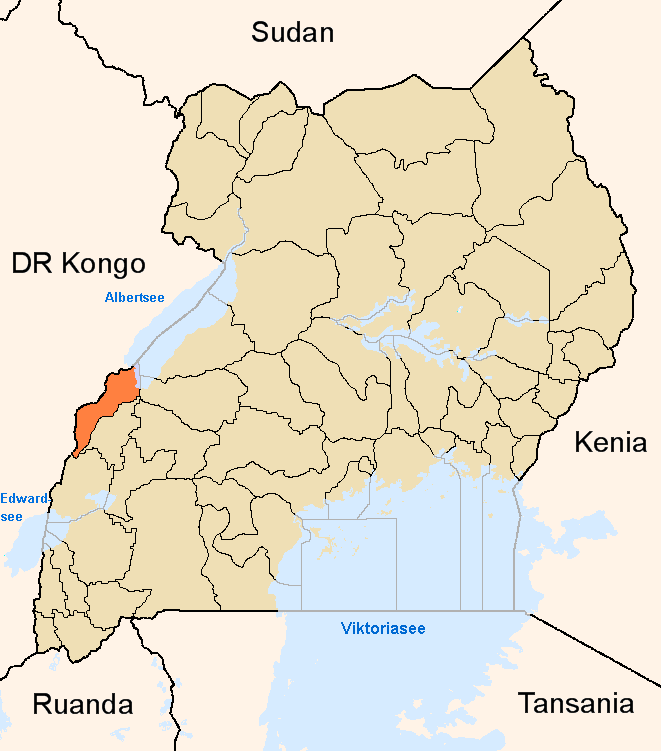
- Map of the Bundibugyo District — in western Uganda.
- Date: March 22, 2014
- Location: Lake Albert, Uganda near the Democratic Republic of the Congo border; 1.666861°N 30.927653°E
- Type: Boat capsizing
- Cause: Overcrowding
- Deaths: 251
- Injuries: 45

On March 22, 2014, a boat traveling on Africa's Lake Albert capsized. According to local police, 45 survivors were rescued. Officially, 251 people died in the accident.

== Accident ==
Early on March 22, 2014, two boats carrying people from the Kyangwali Refugee Settlement left the Ugandan shore of Lake Albert en route to the Democratic Republic of the Congo (DRC). On the way, one of the boats capsized. Its passengers had been returning home after United Nations and Congolese forces won major victories over the Allied Democratic Forces and M23 rebel groups in recent months. There was no evidence that the boat's passengers had left Uganda due to conditions at the refugee camp.

Reports indicated that the accident occurred due to overcrowding, a common cause of boating casualties in the region due to lax enforcement of safety rules. The boat's listed capacity was 80, but approximately 300 people were on board at the time of the accident. The lack of life vests and inability of most passengers to swim also contributed to the high death toll. Additionally, the boat was in poor condition mechanically.

== Death toll and response ==
Initial efforts led to the rescue of 45 survivors and recovery of 19 bodies on March 22. Survivors were taken to the Bundibugyo District of Uganda, where they received care from the Ugandan government and the UN High Commissioner for Refugees. By March 24, 109 bodies were recovered. Of those, 88 were accepted for burial in DRC. The remainder were rejected due to cultural concerns over burying people more than 72 hours after death and were buried at the Bundibugyo hospital cemetery. On March 27, the official death toll was revised to 251. Most of the dead were children.

The boat's skipper recalled counting 96 adults on board, but he did not count the children. Police said they believed nearly all passengers had been accounted for.

In a statement, the United Nations said it was "shocked and saddened" by the tragedy. Three days of national mourning were declared in DRC. The government also helped arrange funerals and offered support for the dead. On April 7, DRC announced plans to repatriate about 21,000 refugees living in Uganda. DRC envoy to Uganda Jean Okoto Lolakombe remarked "It is sad that we lost our people, but we have learnt a lesson from the incident." There were 175,000 registered Congolese refugees living in Uganda as of March 2014.
