= Fleming and Ferguson =

Defunct Scottish shipbuilding company

Fleming and Ferguson was a Scottish marine engineering and shipbuilding company that traded between 1877 and 1969.

== History ==
=== 1877–1914 ===
William Y. Fleming and Peter Ferguson (1840–1911) founded the company in Paisley, Scotland in 1877, making marine steam engines. In 1885 they expanded into shipbuilding by taking over the business and Phoenix Shipyard of H. McIntyre & Co., which had built 122 ships since 1877, including PS Waverley (1885) for Campbell of Kilmun. Fleming and Ferguson became a private company in 1895 and a public limited company in 1898. In 1903 the Ferguson family withdrew from the business and set up their own shipyard, Ferguson Shipbuilders, at Port Glasgow. However, Fleming and Ferguson survived their departure and developed a World-class reputation for reciprocating engines and small ships.

In 1889 Fleming and Ferguson built the cargo ship Singapore with quadruple-expansion engines. By 1894 Fleming and Ferguson were also making water-tube boilers, which were featured in an article in The Engineer. The firm also built reciprocating engines for non-marine use. In 1904 it supplied two inverted triple-expansion engines for a water company in Brighton.

In the 1890s the company entered the specialist market for "knock down" vessels. These were bolted together at the shipyard, all the parts marked with numbers, disassembled into many hundreds of parts and transported in kit form for final reassembly with rivets. This elaborate method of construction was used to provide inland vessels for export. In 1898 it built the stern wheel paddle steamer PS Premier and exported it in sections for reassembly at Maryborough, Queensland in Australia.

The firm's main specialisms were vessels such as dredgers, barges, tugboats, floating cranes, lighthouse tenders and, in 1904, the icebreaker Champlain. Occasionally it also built steam yachts. In peacetime it also took one Admiralty order, the minelayer Lady Roberts built in 1901 for service in New Zealand. In 1914 it had a workforce of 1,000.

=== First World War ===
In the First World War it built the Racecourse-class minesweepers HMS Lingfield and HMS Lanark (both 1917) and HMS Lewes; Hunt-class minesweepers HMS Hambledon and HMS Heythrop (both 1917), HMS Mallaig, HMS Malvern and HMS Munlochy (both 1918) and HMS Marazion (1919) and several Strath-class naval trawlers.

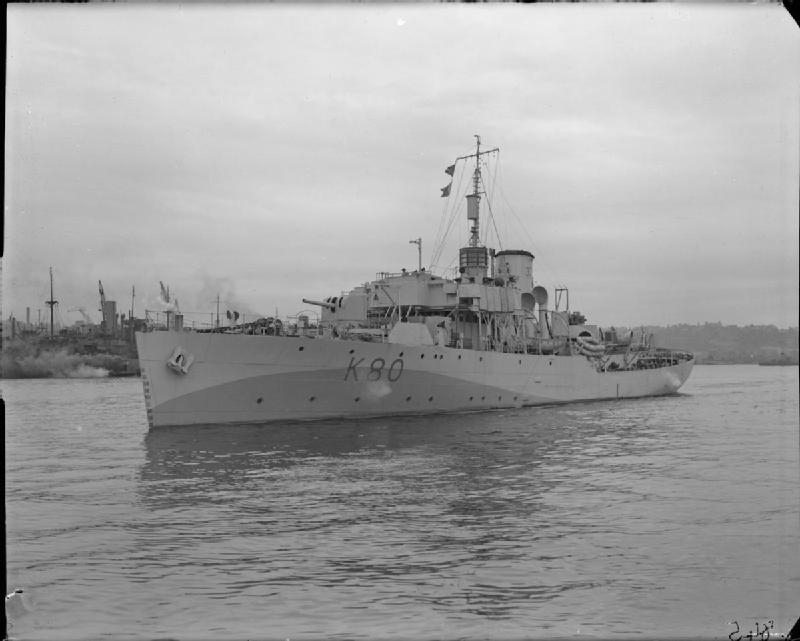
Flower-class corvette HMS Bluebell, built in 1940

=== Second World War ===
In the Second World War it built the River-class frigates HMS Itchen, HMS Exe and HMS Aire (all 1942), HMS Awe (1943) and HMS Dovey (1944); Flower-class corvettes HMS Campanula, HMS Bluebell, HMS Montbretia, HMS Tamarisk, HMS Monkshood, HMS Jonquil, HMS Larkspur, HMS Clover and HMS Amaranthus; Castle-class corvettes HMS Scarborough Castle, HMS Lancaster Castle and HMS Allington Castle (K689); Algerine-class minesweeper HMS Cockatrice (J229); Isles-class naval trawlers HMS Kerrera, HMS Cava, HMS Eriskay and HMS Bardsey and numerous LCTs.

=== 1945–69 ===
In 1946 Fleming and Ferguson built the East African Railways and Harbours Corporation stern wheel paddle steamer PS Lugard II, which plied the Albert Nile in Uganda. In 1964 the American Marine and Machinery Co. Inc. bought Fleming and Ferguson.

The company's final ship was a dredger that it built speculatively. Fleming and Ferguson ceased trading before completing the vessel so Hugh Maclean of Renfrew completed her. The dredger, yard number 804, was eventually named Bled and exported to Yugoslavia.

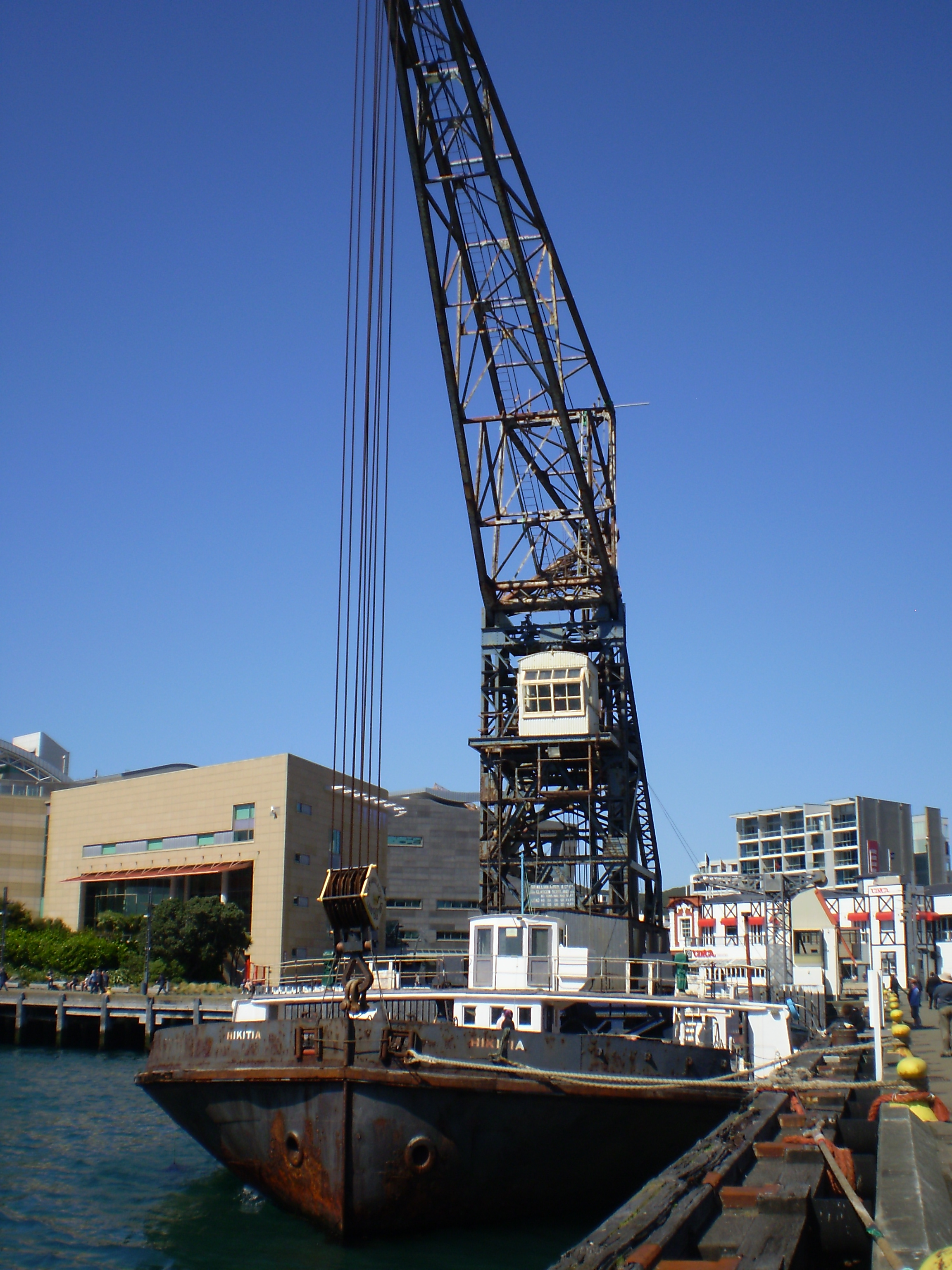
Floating crane Hikitia in Wellington, New Zealand

== Surviving ships ==
Surviving Fleming and Ferguson products include the floating steam crane Hikitia (1926) and dredger Otakou (1929), both in New Zealand; dredger Clee Ness (1961) (now called UCO 1 and registered in Bahrain) and research vessel Andusandhani (1963) on the Hooghly River in West Bengal.
