= Kibiro =

Village in Uganda

Coordinates: 1°40′27″N 31°15′09″E

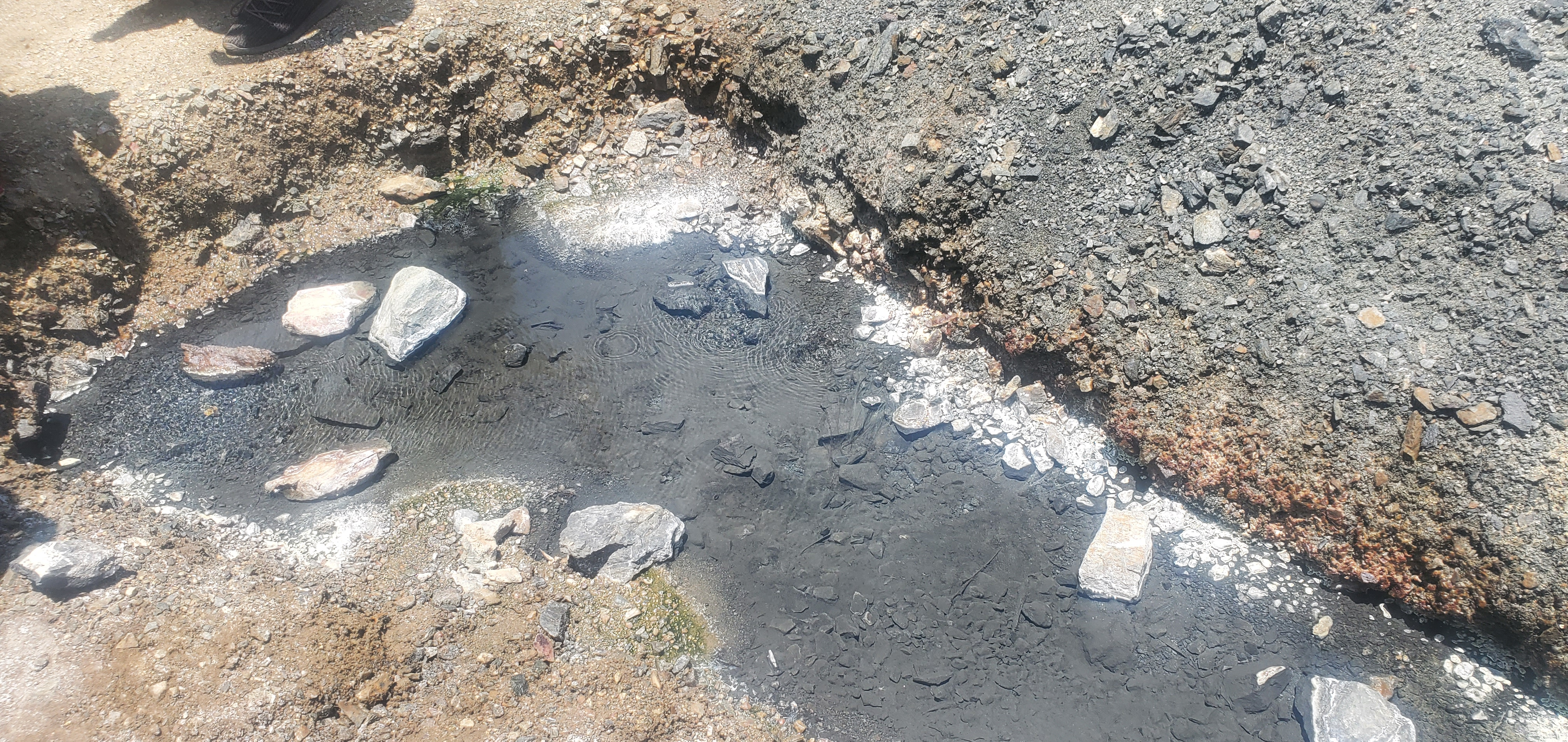
Kibiro hotsprings and salt mines in Hoima

Kibiro is a small fishing village in Uganda that lies on the south-eastern shore of Lake Albert The residents of the village are unable to produce their own agricultural products, and must trade with other communities for most of their necessities. Residents of Kibiro support themselves primarily through the production and trade of salt. Due to its cultural value, this site was added to the UNESCO World Heritage Tentative List on September 10, 1997.

== Geographical setting ==
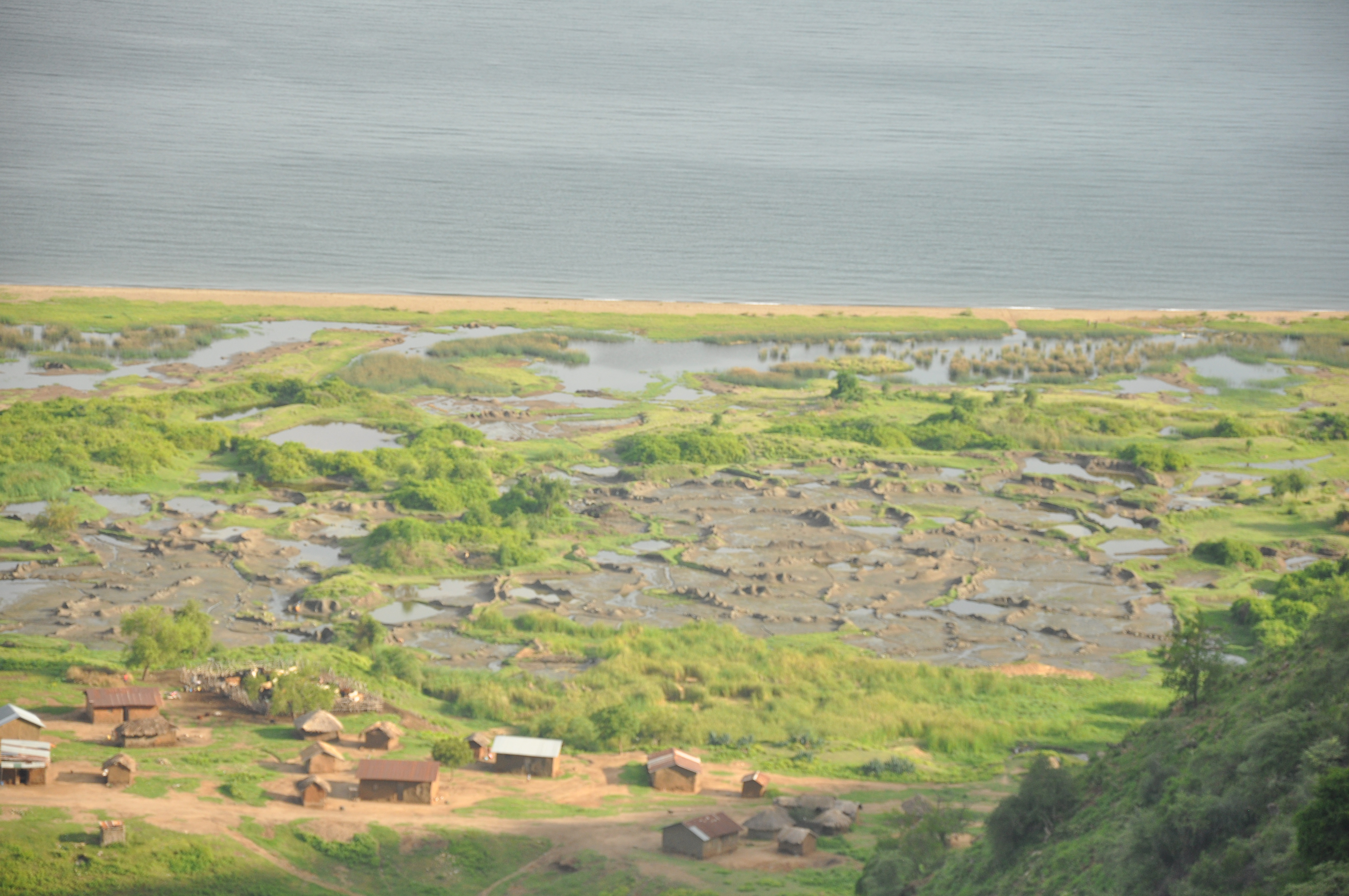
Kibiro salt Garden

Kibiro is located at the bottom of the Western Rift Valley on the Continent of Africa, and on the eastern shore of Lake Albert. "Kibiro is in a rain shadow and has markedly less rain than the adjacent country" It is known for having a windy and hot climate, with yearly temperatures ranging between 22.0 °C and 29.3 °C “The coastal plain at Kibiro is in the shape of a triangle; with its base formed by the bottom of the escarpment it is appreciably wider than the narrow plain to its north-east, while to its south-west between Kibiro and Hoima there is in places no plain at all”. “There is no road to Kibiro, the main access being a steep footpath down the escarpment. The soil at Kibiro is shallow and rocky and the adjacent escarpment creates a local rain shadow. The present village of Kibiro is a settlement of relatively scattered dwellings extending for several kilometers along the coastal plain. It is divided into two main parts by the Mukihanga Valley: the larger part of the village lies to the south-west and is known as Bubare, the part to the north-east is known as Kihenda. The coastal plain at Kibiro has two levels: a slightly higher area of gently sloping, usually stony ground that abuts the escarpment base; and a lower, flatter, often swampy, sand area adjacent to the lake but separated from it by two beach ridges.

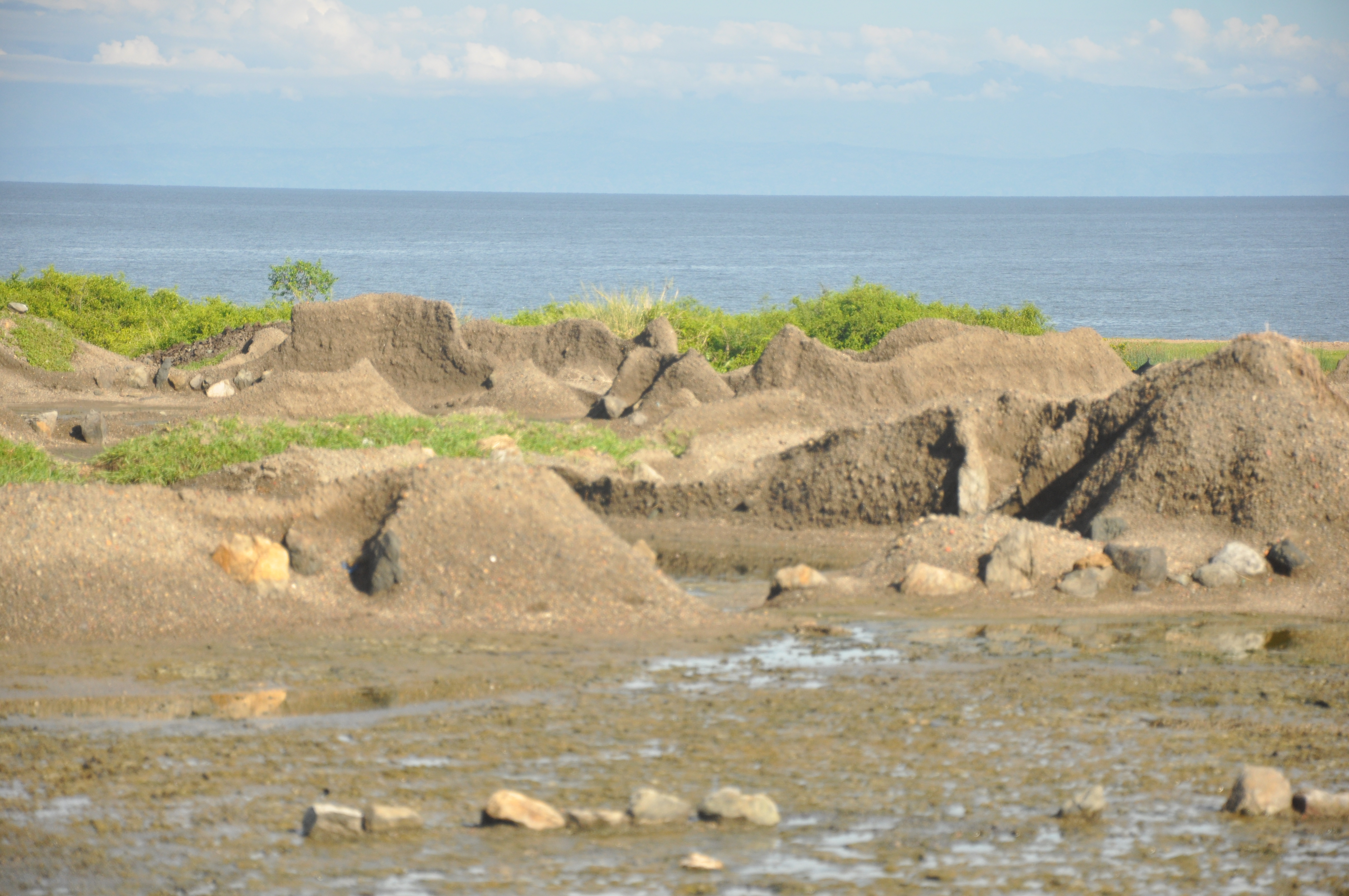
The production of salt at Kibiro is based on leaching of saline soil as seen in the picture, the resulting brine is then boiled to evaporate the water

== History ==
The production of salt in Kibiro is an important industry. Kibiro’s economy revolves around salt. “Without its salt industry Kibiro would probably be merely a small fishing village, lacking its extensive and deep archaeological deposits”. The salt is produced exclusively by women. “The production of salt at Kibiro is based on leaching of saline soil, the resulting brine is then boiled to evaporate the water”. The process of salt production in Kibiro is a bit more sophisticated than others. The process used to produce the salt in Kibiro constantly reuses the same soil. “This recycling is accomplished by the repeated spreading of loose dry soil on the surface of a damp salt-bearing deposits, from which sun-induced capillary action draws out salty moisture”. The process of winning the salt entailed techniques that were more tedious than the relatively simple harvesting methods employed at the crater lakes on the equator. With the unique technique that is done to produce salt, it is believed that Kibiro will most likely never run out of salt, the only way in which the salt would run out is if the hot springs dry up, but before that is an actual possibility, it is believed that the salt-workers are more likely to run out of firewood. The Bunyoro shore of Lake Albert has relatively few resources except the salt produced at Kibiro and formerly at other places.

== Salt-production process ==
No record of the salt-production process exists prior to the reports of Europeans in the 1800s. The salt-production techniques described by early Europeans differ in many ways from the techniques employed by present-day Kibiro residents.

Today in Kibiro, water from hot springs flows over the area's salty soil, keeping it moist. Workers sprinkle dry earth over this, which draws the salt up from the earth. The soil is then collected and placed in a sieve that is situated over a large pot. Water is poured over the soil, and the water carries the salt into the pot. This solution is then boiled to produce salt.

Salt production in the area is done exclusively by women.

== Archaeology ==
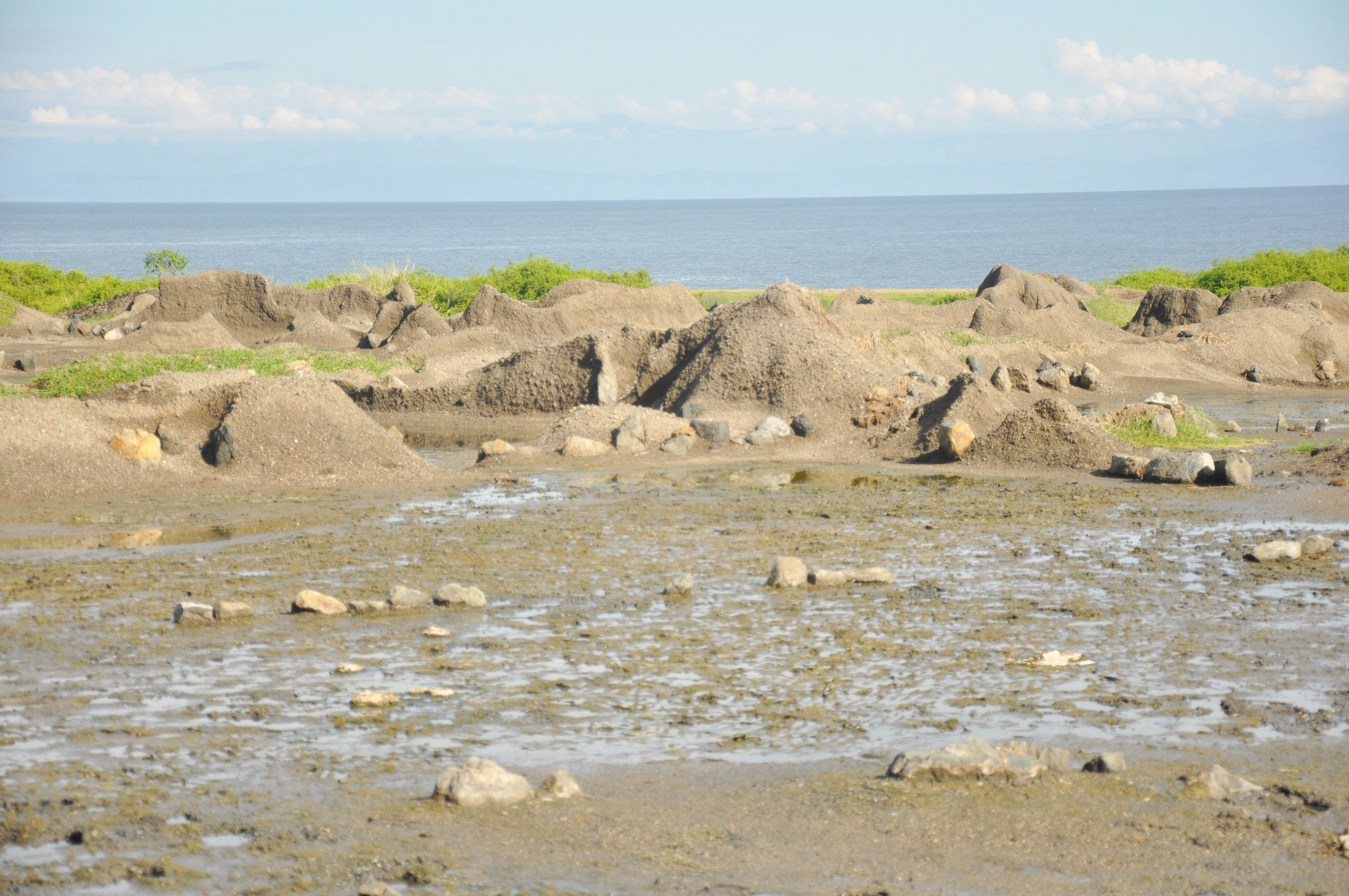
The fragments of broken pottery, which are known locally as nkibo, form an almost continuous carpet on the Kihenda surface, much of which has only a thin grass cover

The site of Kibiro has been of great interest to archaeologists because of its unique deposits that are found near western Uganda.“The surface of the higher area of the Kibero coastal plain has a scatter of broken pottery that extends for over a kilometer from north-east to south-west”. This is a unique for there is no place else that has the same “deep extensive, well-stratified occupation deposits created by iron-using agriculturalists over the last millennium”. “The fragments of broken pottery, which are known locally as nkibo, form an almost continuous carpet on the Kihenda surface, much of which has only a thin grass cover”. Salt manufactured from the springs at Kibero in western Bunyoro was distributed across Lake Albert by dugout canoes to populations in the Lendu area of the northeast Congo. Kibero salt was obtained from saliferous earths.

There was a series of excavations done in the small village of Kibiro by archaeologist Graham Connah. Connah first excavated Kibiro in 1989. The site of Kibero consisted of four discrete cuttings, which sampled three separated parts of the most extensive area of settlement deposits. “The area in which the cutting took place is known as Kihenda, which is located between the two largest groups of salt-gardens and is said to be the oldest part of the village.

The first cutting, excavated in early 1989, was only a test-hole, intended to gain a preliminary understanding of the deposits and their contents and to establish an initial radiocarbon chronology”. The determination of where to do the first cutting was based on the assumption that the deposits that were shallower than 3 m but deeper than 0.8 m would lead to the finding of natural deposits. In Cutting I the deposits excavated were in an irregular series of units, which contained ashy earth in the higher levels and sand, gravel, and silt towards the bottom levels. There were fragments of wood charcoal as well as sherds of pottery. In addition to the ecofacts, cultural remains that were uncovered in Cutting I were pieces of smoking pipes, disc beads of freshwater shell that were infrequently scattered, as well as two shell artifacts which consisted of a valve from the freshwater bivalve Mutela emini. There was also animal bones that were discovered at the deposit. With all of this being tied together with the other evidence found, indicated domestic activities as a major factor in their formation.

Cutting II-IV were excavated in 1990; while Cutting I had been excavated in arbitrary splits; Cuttings II-IV were excavated in true stratigraphic units. After they had excavated the site the work that Connah had done showed to have poor visibility of the stratification. To get a better stratification they needed to acquire and take out certain blocks of deposits to help have a better view of the stratification.

The main archaeological deposits at Kibiro seem to constitute a flat settlement mound of an irregular shape.

=== Artifacts ===
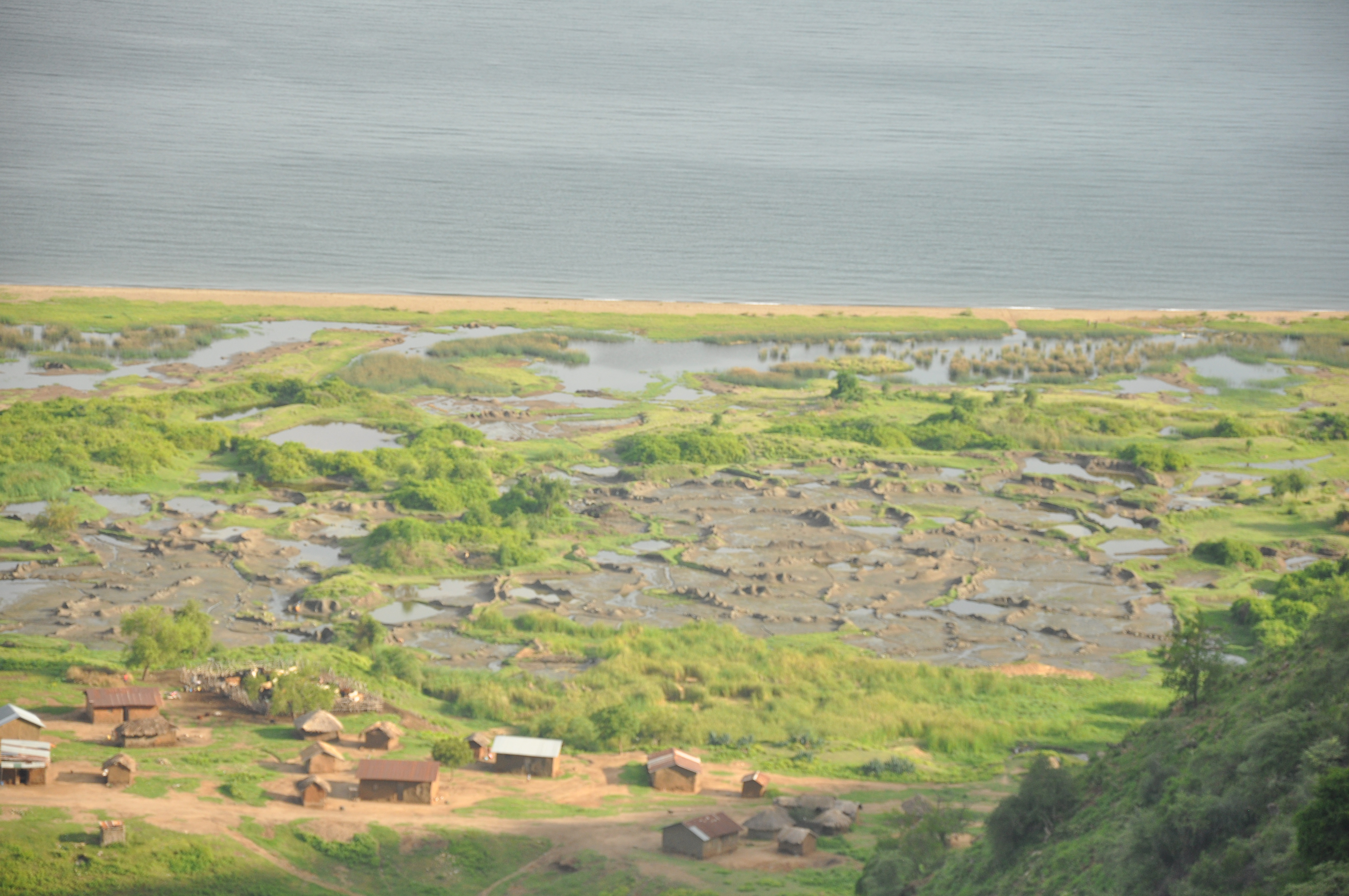
Kibiro Salt Gardens, located in Hoima district, Uganda, is a historical site that dates back centuries. It is known for its traditional salt extraction methods and is considered one of the oldest salt gardens in East Africa. The history of Kibiro Salt Gardens can be traced back to the pre-colonial era when the indigenous people of the area, primarily the Alur and the Banyoro, discovered the natural salt springs in the region. These salt springs were formed due to volcanic activity in the area, resulting in the presence of saltwater in the underground aquifers.

At the site of Kibiro there were pottery sherds found. There have been “sherds of pottery, stone grinders, grindstones, occasionally there have been beads, smoking-pipe fragments, cowry shells, pieces of freshwater shell and scraps of bone, both mammal and fish”. In the two excavations that were done over 2 metric tonnes of broken pottery were recovered. The current pottery found at Kibiro has a similar decoration as the sherds that were recovered. The pottery of Kibiro had a decoration of knotted strip roulette and carved roulette, where the twisted string roulette is fundamentally missing. The variation in the roulette patterns were more than just a type of decorations, they different types of roulette patterns also showed chronological variations at Kibiro. As there seems to be much variation among the pottery of Kibiro, it seems unlikely that the pottery from this area was made here. There have been similar forms of the type of pottery that is found at Kibiro in areas that neighbor it, with that it is believed that the pottery that was discovered at Kibiro was made somewhere else and brought into the village.

There were other materials that were found when excavating at Kibiro. Some of the other items that were found were iron, pieces of smoking pipes, as well as beads. The beads that were found were common to find while the excavations were being done. The beads were generally disc beads of freshwater shell, and then later in the deposits there were ivory beads and a glass beads as well, which are rare to find, were also found.

Apart from there being pottery and other cultural materials found at the Kibiro excavation site, there were also animal remains uncovered. The majority of the animal remains were bones that appeared to be well preserved but were too shattered to be able to diagnosed. The animal bones typically that the people of Kibiro relied on fish for a source of food as well as on domesticated cows, goats and/or sheep. In addition to fish and cows, there were other wild animal remains found which were those of hare, various rodents, crocodile, snakes, frogs and birds, that are believed to have been supplemental to their diet or may have been included in the deposits for reasons that are not quite clear.

=== Stratigraphy ===
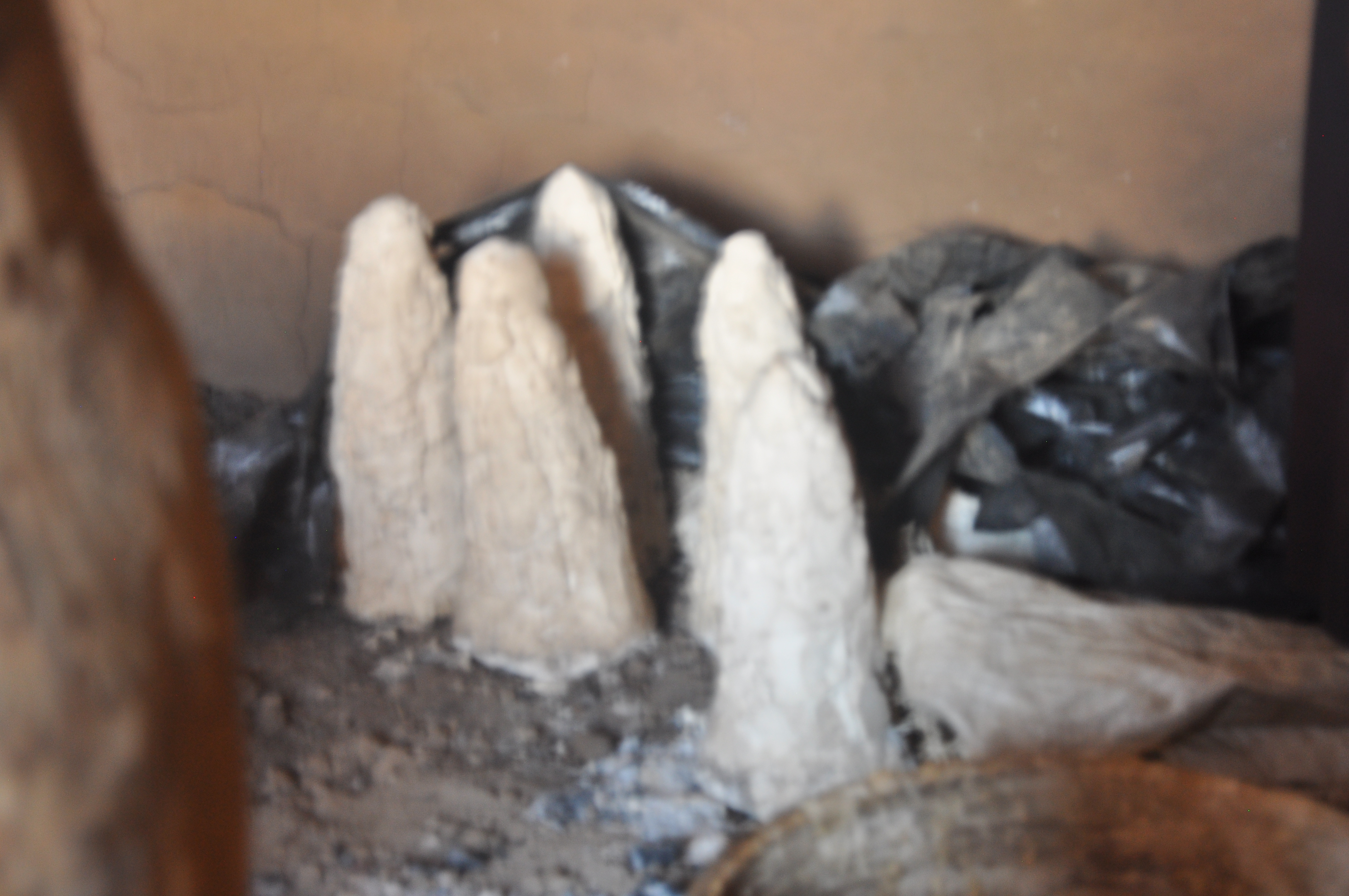
Kibiro salts are extracted from the natural salt springs found in the Kibiro area. These salt springs were formed due to volcanic activity in the region, resulting in the presence of saltwater in the underground aquifers. The indigenous people of the area, primarily the Alur and the Banyoro, discovered these salt springs and recognized the value of the salt. The extraction of Kibiro salts is traditionally done using simple and age-old methods. The saltwater from the springs is diverted into shallow pools or pans made of clay. The water is then left to evaporate under the sun, leaving behind salt crystals. These crystals are then harvested, cleaned, and packaged for sale or trade.

The series of cutting that was done at Kibiro showed a series of stratified deposits that had accumulated over a period of 700–800 years up to the present and they seemingly resulted from both domestic and industrial activities. When the cuttings were more closely examined, they found that Cuttings I, III and IV were all found to be horizontal but in comparison, Cutting II was found to be tilted, in areas that were very steep. “Cutting II was located at the edge of what seemed the deepest archaeological deposits, revealed sloping rock rubble which had probably resulted from long continuance of the practice of removing stones from adjacent salt-gardens and heaping them out of the way”. The other cuttings had a variety of thicknesses which were made up of earth, sand, gravel or silt, blended with stones that were different sizes and also had a phenomenal number of potsherds in the majority of the cases. In the process of excavating Cutting II, there was one hearth that was discovered which was believed to have been used in the process for salt-boiling. With the hearths being uncovered it also brought to light that the making of salt in Kibiro was produced throughout the occupation. According to Graham Connah in his article published in 1991, he states that “because Cutting I was a limited test-hole, Cutting II had partly tilted deposits, and Cutting IV sampled the shallower part of the archaeological deposits near the edge of Lake Albert, Cutting III provides the most reliable and most complete stratified sequence.

== Discussion ==
With there being many excavations being done in Kibiro, one must be aware of the consequences that come with the archaeological work being done. If it had not been for the salt industry, the village of Kibiro would have only been known as a small fishing village. With there being a demand for the salt, it created the demand for people to want to go and live in the area to make be part of the industry. There had to be some understanding that, “as time goes on the village population increases, it seems inevitable that more and more of the important Kibiro deposits will be destroyed by the digging of these pits”. Though it is important to know the origins of an old kingdom, it comes at the cost of exploiting the resources that make the small village of Kibiro unique and cause it to no longer be the place in which the beginnings can be traced.
