= Butiaba =

Ugandan town

- Map of Uganda showing the location of Butiaba; Placement on map is approximate.
- Coordinates: 01°49′08″N 31°19′33″E
- Country: Uganda
- Region: Western Uganda
- Sub-region: Bunyoro sub-region
- District: Buliisa District
- Elevation: 622 m (2,041 ft)
- Time zone: UTC+3 (EAT)

Butiaba, is a town in the Western Region of Uganda. It is a fishing town and landing site on the shores of Lake Albert, in Uganda.

== Location ==
Butiaba is located on the eastern shores of Lake Albert, in Buliisa District, in the Bunyoro sub-region of Western Uganda. Butiaba is approximately 47.5 kilometres (30 mi), by road, southwest of the district headquarters at Buliisa. Butiaba is located about 58 kilometres (36 mi) north of Hoima, the largest city in the Bunyoro sub-region.

This location is approximately 257 kilometres (160 mi), by road, northwest of Kampala, Uganda's capital and largest city. The coordinates of Butiaba are:1°49'08.0"N, 31°19'33.0"E (Latitude:1.818889; Longitude:31.325833). Butiaba is situated at an average altitude of 622 metres (2,041 ft) above mean sea level.

== Overview ==
During the first half of the 20th century, Butiaba was an important transportation hub, where merchandise from eastern Democratic Republic of the Congo (DRC) and from South Sudan was transported by boat across Lake Albert to Butiaba Harbour. At Butiaba, merchandise was transported overland, through Masindi to Masindi Port. At Masindi Port, the produce would be loaded on barges, ferried across Lake Kyoga to Soroti. At Soroti, it would be loaded onto railway wagons for transportation by rail to Mombasa, Kenya, on the Indian Ocean, for export. Imported goods and merchandise were transported along the same route, in reverse.

When the East African Railways Corporation was dissolved in the 1970s, Butiaba's prominence declined and the harbour became dormant. A significant amount of petroleum deposits has since been discovered in the ground and under the lake near Butiaba. Reviving Butiaba Harbour to play a role in the transportation of equipment, manpower, and petroleum is being considered.

== Population ==
As of July 2014, the exact population of Butiaba was not known. The national population census in Uganda took place in August 2014 but results are yet to come out.

== Point of interest ==
Lake Albert - One of the lakes in the Western Rift Valley. The international border between the DRC and Uganda runs through it.

== See also ==
- Uganda Oil Refinery
- Buliisa District
- East African Crude Oil Pipeline
