= Kasenyi, Buliisa =

Kasenyi
- Location in Uganda
- Coordinates: 02°12′09″N 31°28′59″E
- Country: Uganda
- Region: Western Region of Uganda
- Sub-region: Bunyoro sub-region
- District: Buliisa District
- Elevation: 2,130 ft (650 m)

Kasenyi is a village in Ngedwo sub county, Buliisa District, in the Western Region of Uganda. It is the location of a "central processing facility" (CPF) of Uganda's oil fields in the Albertine Graben.

== Location ==
Kasenyi is located on the shores of Lake Albert, approximately 113 kilometres (70 mi), by road, north of Hoima, the largest city in Bunyoro sub-region. This is approximately 307 kilometres (191 mi), by road, northwest of Kampala, the capital and largest city of Uganda.

The geographical coordinates of Kasenyi are:02°12'09.0"N, 31°28'59.0"E (Latitude:2.202500; Longitude:31.483056).

== Overview ==
The village of Kasenyi has been selected by the government of Uganda and the three major oil companies exploring for oil in Western Uganda; to include "the Central Processing Facility (CPF), construction camps, accommodation facilities, a workshop and feeder pipelines". The three oil companies have named the petroleum project in Buliisa District "Tilenga", after an antelope in Acholi and Bunyoro. The antelope is called Til in Acholi and Engabi in Bunyoro.

The oil industrial area and associated access roads will be set up on 310 hectares (770 acres) in Kasenyi. The crude oil extracte in Buliisa and Nwoya districts will be processed at Tilenga to extract water, gas and other impurities, before being piped to the refinery in Kabaale in Hoima District.

There will be another CPF located in Buhuka in Hoima District to process crude oil from the Kingfisher Development Area before piping it to the refinery. Tilenga is projected to yield 200,000 barrels of crude oil per day.

== See also ==
- Uganda Oil Refinery
- Uganda–Tanzania Crude Oil Pipeline
- Hoima–Kampala Petroleum Products Pipeline
