= PS Stanley =

PS Stanley is the name of the following ships:

- PS Stanley (1864), a paddle steamer for the London and North Western Railway, in service until 1890.
- PS Stanley (1913), a paddle steamer for the Uganda Railway company.

== See also ==
- Stanley (boat), an Icelandic fishing boat
- Stanley (disambiguation)
