= Buliisa =

Ugandan town

- Map of Uganda showing the location of Buliisa.
- Coordinates: 02°07′18″N 31°24′56″E
- District: Buliisa District

Area
  - Total: 33.2 km^{2} (12.8 sq mi)
- Elevation: 627 m (2,057 ft)

Population (2020 Estimate)
  - Total: 9,500
  - Density: 286.4/km^{2} (742/sq mi)
- Time zone: EAT

Buliisa, also Bulisa, is a town in the Western Region of Uganda. It is the site of the headquarters of the Buliisa District. Neighborhoods within Buliisa Municipality include Wanseko and Kasenyi.

== Location ==
Buliisa is located in the northwestern corner of Buliisa District, along the shores of Lake Albert, approximately 91 kilometres (57 mi), by road, north of Hoima, the largest city in the Bunyoro sub-region. This is approximately 299 kilometres (186 mi), by road, northwest of Kampala, Uganda's capital and largest city. The geographical coordinates of Buliisa Town are:02°07'18.0"N, 31°24'56.0"E (Latitude:2.121667; Longitude:31.415556). The town sits at an average elevation of 627 metres (2,057 ft) above mean sea level.

== Overview ==
Buliisa is on the northeastern shores of Lake Albert. The town gained prominence during the 2000s because of the large hydrocarbon deposits that have been discovered underground in the district and elsewhere in the Bunyoro sub-region.

== Population ==
The Uganda Bureau of Statistics (UBOS), estimated the mid-year population of Buliisa at 7,600 in July 2015. In 2020, UBOS estimated the mid-year population of the town at 9,500. Of these, approximately 5,000 (52.6 percent) are males and approximately 4,500 (47.4 percent) are females. UBOS estimates that the town's population has grown at an average annual rate of 4.56 percent, between 2015 and 2020.

Historical population
Year	Pop.	±%
2015	7,600	—
2020	9,500	+25.0%

== Infrastructure ==
The infrastructure already installed or in development in Buliisa Municipality and its neighborhood include: 1. Buliisa Health Center IV 2. Offices of Buliisa Town Council 3. Buliisa Resource Center 4. Offices of Buliisa District Council 5. The northern Central Processing Facility (CPF) and 6. The northern crude oil intake pipeline from Buliisa to the Uganda Oil Refinery and the Uganda-Tanzania Crude Oil Pipeline in Kabaale, Hoima District.

The 111 kilometres (69 mi) Hoima–Butiaba–Wanseko Road terminates in Wanseko, a northern suburb of Buliisa Municipality.

== See also ==
- List of cities and towns in Uganda
