= Pakwach District =

- District
- Interactive map of Pakwach District
- Coordinates: 02°28′N 31°30′E
- Country: Uganda
- Region: Northern Region
- Capital: Pakwach
- Time zone: UTC+3 (EAT)
- Website: www.pakwach.go.ug

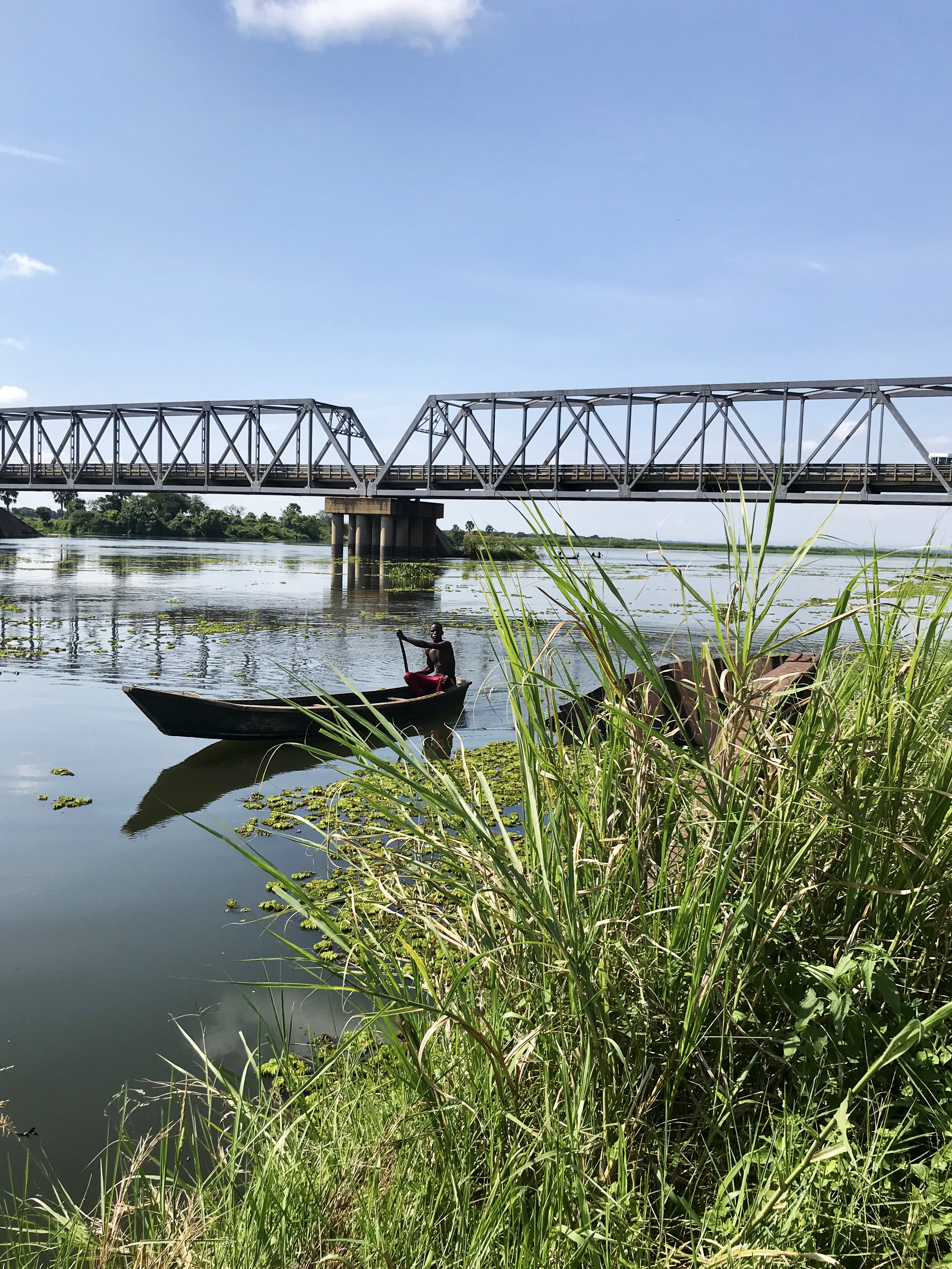
Pakwach Bridge

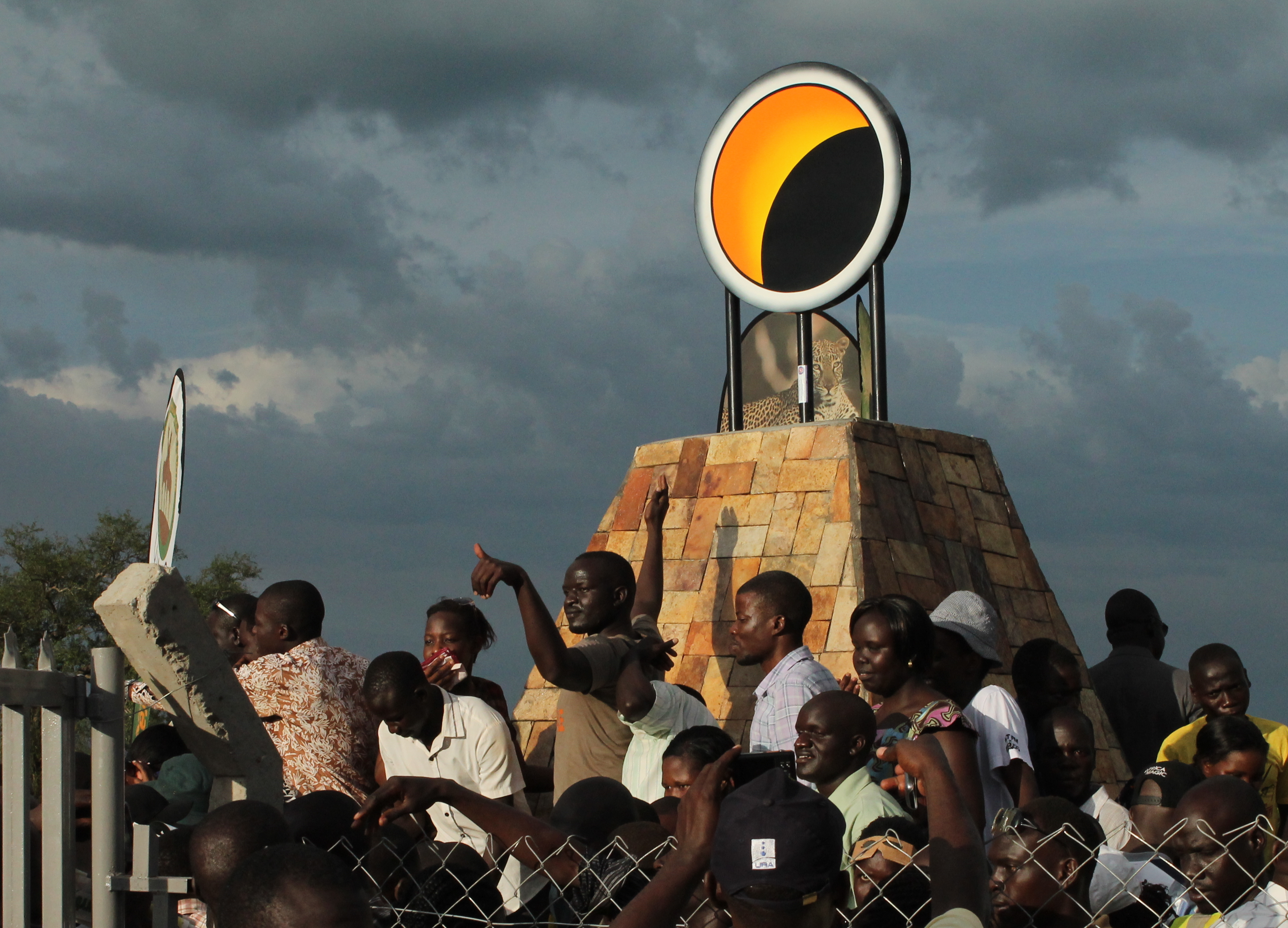
Eclipse monument in Pakwach.

Pakwach District is a district in the Northern Region of Uganda. The town of Pakwach is the location of the district headquarters.

== Location ==
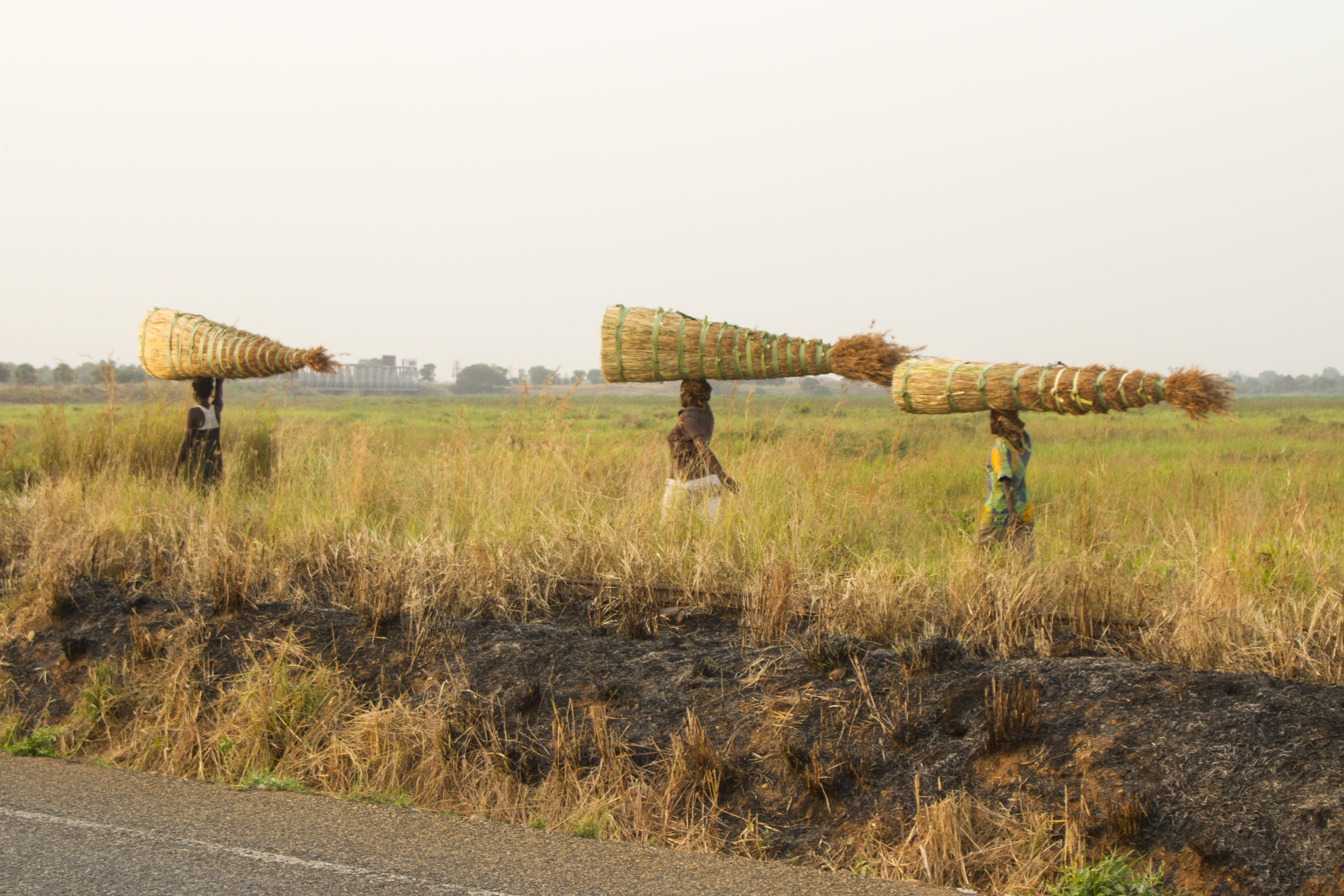
3 women walk along old railway tracks carrying spear grass to the market in Pakwach, Northern Uganda

Pakwach District is bordered by Nebbi District to the west, Madi Okolo District to the north, Nwoya District to the east, Buliisa District to the southeast and the DR Congo to the south. The town of Pakwach, where the district headquarters are located is approximately 20 kilometres (12 mi) east of Nebbi, the nearest large town. This is approximately 131 kilometres (81 mi), by road, southeast of Arua, the largest city in the West Nile sub-region. Pakwach is about 370 kilometres (230 mi), by road, northwest of Kampala, the capital and largest city of Uganda.

== Overview ==
Pakwach District was created by the government of Uganda in 2015 and became operational on 1 July 2017. It was earlier part of Nebbi District.

== Economy ==
- Fishing from the Nile river
- Tourism (River Nile, Murchison falls)
- Maize
- Cassava
- Beans

== Livestock kept ==
- Cattle
- Sheep
- Goat
- Pigs
- Chicken

== See also ==
- Districts of Uganda
- Northern Region, Uganda
- Parliament of Uganda
- Pakwach
