= Pakwach =

Town in Northern Region of Uganda, Uganda

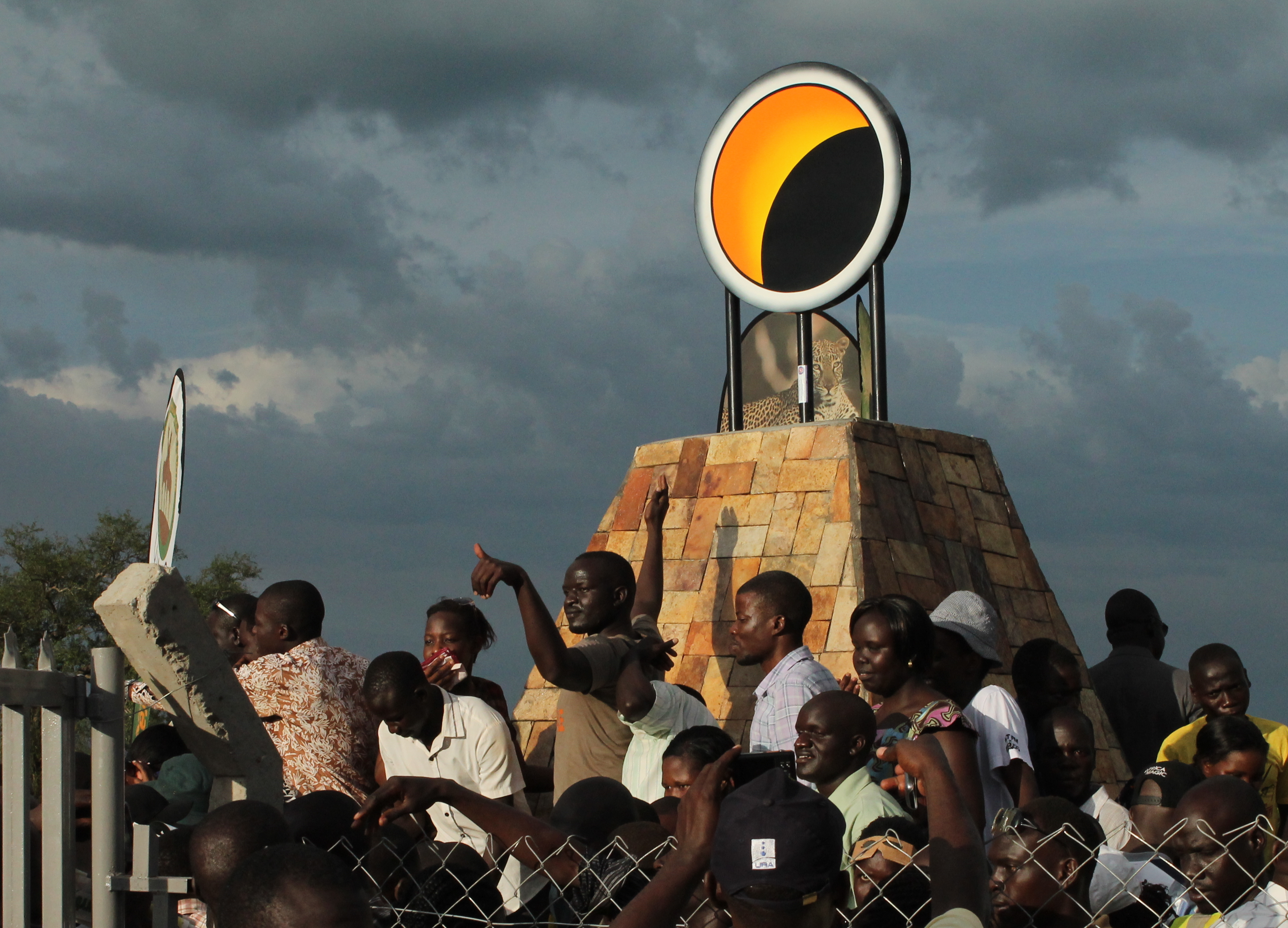

- Location in Uganda
- Coordinates: 02°27′43″N 31°29′54″E
- Country: Uganda
- Region: Northern Region of Uganda
- Sub-region: West Nile sub-region
- District: Pakwach District

Area
  - Total: 8.96 sq mi (23.2 km^{2})
- Elevation: 2,044 ft (623 m)

Population (2024 Census)
  - Total: 31,079

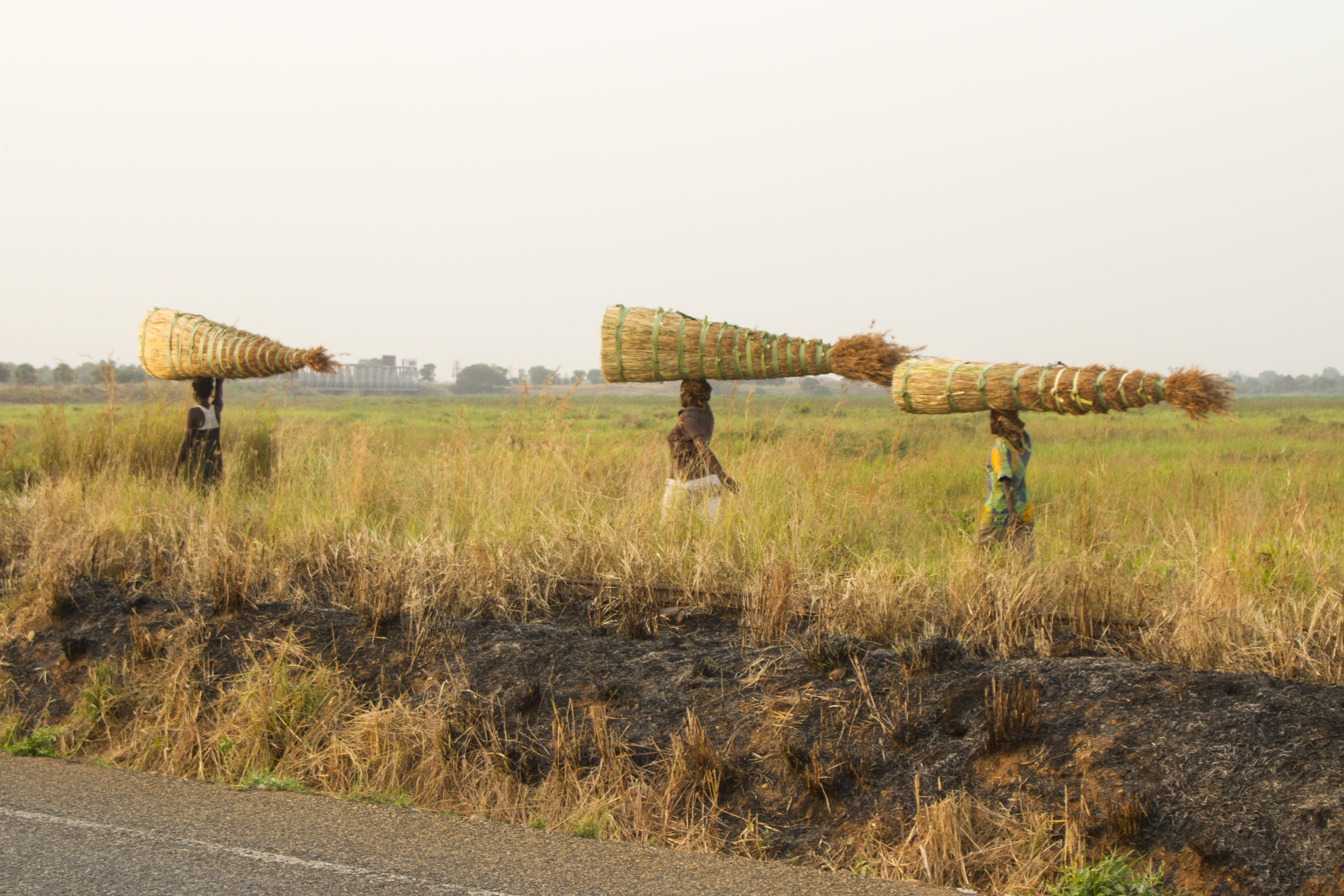
3 women walk along old railway tracks carrying spear grass to the market in Pakwach, Northern Uganda

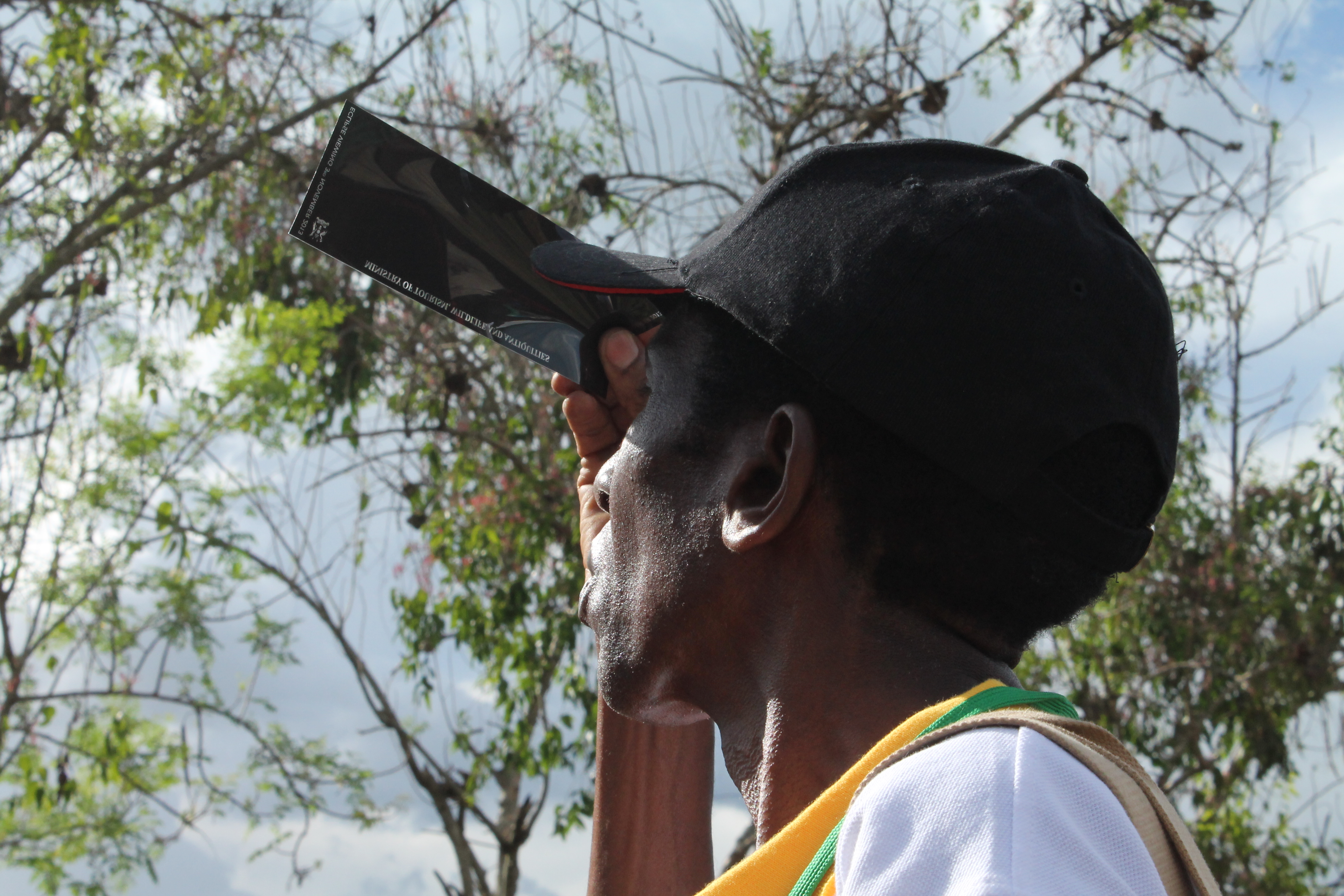
Viewing eclipse through cellophane.

Pakwach is a town in the Northern Region of Uganda. It is the main commercial, political and administrative center of Pakwach District. In the 19th century the town came under brief occupation by the Ottoman branch of the Khedivate of Egypt, as part of Hatt-ı Üstuva (Equatoria) Vilayet.

== Geography ==
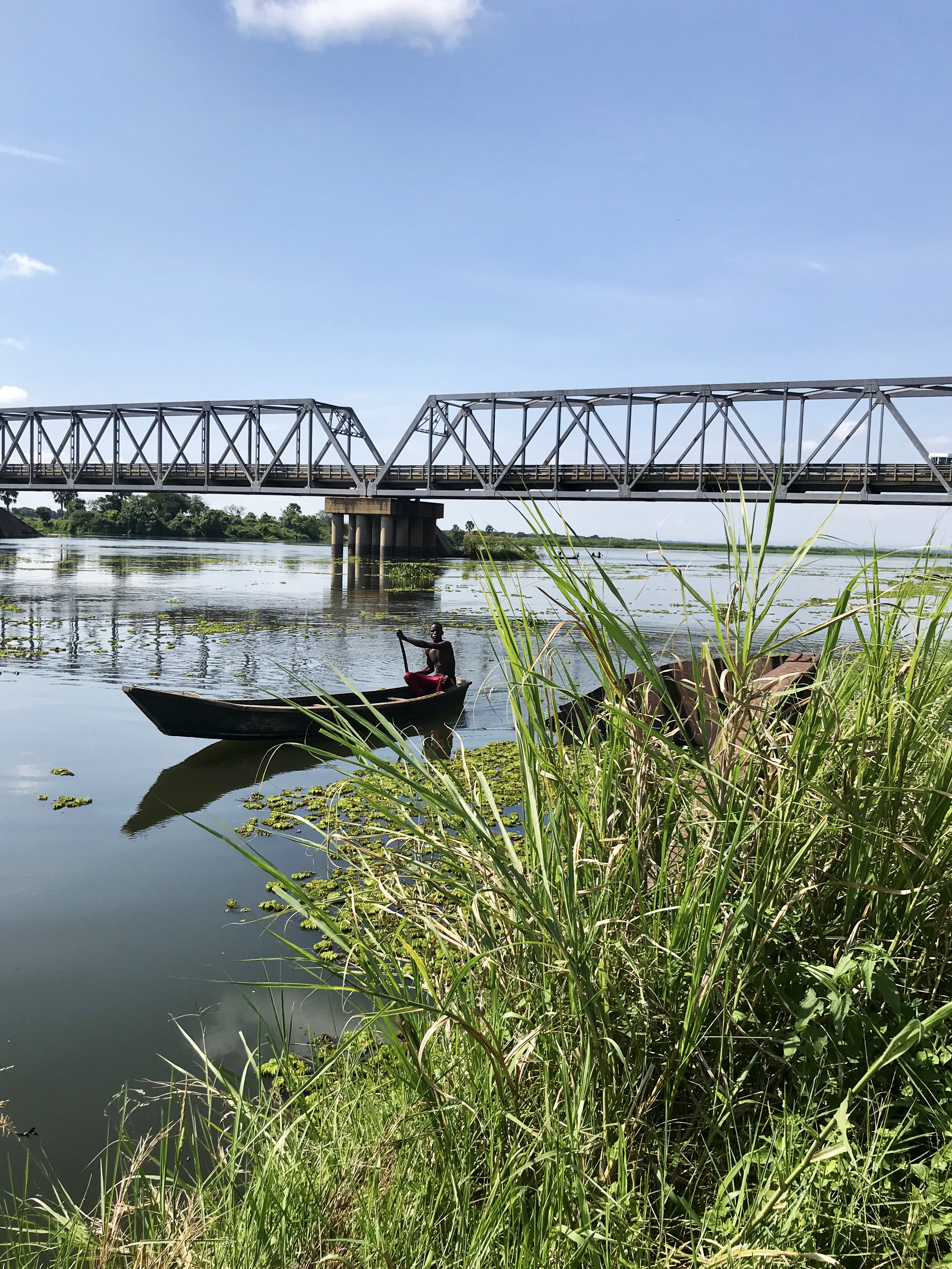
Famous bridge before entring Pakwach

Pakwach is in Pakwach District, West Nile sub-region. It is approximately 53 kilometres (33 mi) east of Nebbi, the nearest large town. It is approximately 131 kilometres (81 mi) southeast of Arua, the largest city in the West Nile sub-region.

This is along the western bank of the Albert Nile, approximately 121 kilometres (75 mi) southwest of Gulu, the largest city in the Uganda's Northern Region. The coordinates of Pakwach are 2°27'43.0"N, 31°29'54.0"E (Latitude:2.461944; Longitude:31.498333).

== Population ==
The 2002 national census estimated the population of the town at 17,625. The Uganda Bureau of Statistics (UBOS) estimated the population of Pakwach at in 21,700, in 2010. In 2011, UBOS estimated the mid-year population of at 22,300. In 2014, the national population census put the population at 23,040.

In 2015, UBOS estimated the population of Pakwach, Uganda at 23,700. In 2020 UBOS estimated the mid-year population of the town at 28,700 inhabitants, of whom 14,900 (51.9 percent) were females and 13,800 (48.1 percent) were males. UBOS calculated that the population of this town increased at an average annual rate of 3.6 percent, between 2015 and 2020.

Historical population
Year	Pop.	±%
1969	935	—
2002	17,625	+1785.0%
2010	21,700	+23.1%
2011	22,300	+2.8%
2014	23,040	+3.3%
2015	23,700	+2.9%
2020	28,700	+21.1%

== 2013 total solar eclipse ==
On 3 November 2013, Pakwach was the centre of Uganda's solar eclipse celebrations. Thousands of locals were joined by solar eclipse tourists and professional observers. The official celebration, which took place at a primary school 10 kilometers from the town of Pakwach, was attended by three kings (Rwothi), Uganda's President Museveni, and cabinet ministers.

== Points of interest ==
The following additional points of interest lie within or close to the town limits: (a) the offices of Pakwach Town Council (b) the offices of Pakwach District local government (c) Pakwach central market (d) the northwestern corner of Murchison Falls National Park, a few kilometers east of Pakwach (e) the Karuma–Olwiyo–Pakwach–Nebbi–Arua Road passes through the middle of town in a general east to west direction and the proposed Pakwach Campus of Muni University, housing the Faculty of Fisheries and Aquaculture Uganda Christian University, with its man campus in Mukono, maintains a campus in Pakwach.

== See also ==
- Rift Valley Railways
- Transport in Uganda
- List of cities and towns in Uganda
