= Lake Albert (Africa) =

Lake in Uganda and the Democratic Republic of the Congo

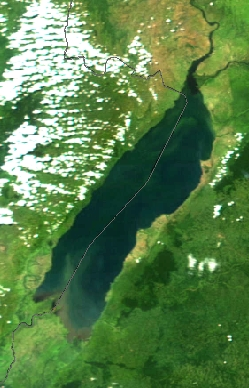
- 2002 NASA MODIS satellite picture. The dotted grey line is the border between Congo (DRC) (left) and Uganda (right).

- Location within Uganda Location within Democratic Republic of the Congo Location within Africa
- Coordinates: 1°41′N 30°55′E
- Primary inflows: Victoria Nile; Semliki River
- Primary outflows: Albert Nile
- Catchment area: 416,661 km^{2} (160,874 sq mi)
- Basin countries: DR Congo and Uganda
- Max. length: 160 km (99 mi)
- Max. width: 30 km (19 mi)
- Surface area: 5,590 km^{2} (2,160 sq mi)
- Average depth: 25 m (82 ft)
- Max. depth: 51 m (167 ft)
- Water volume: 133 km^{3} (32 cu mi)
- Shore length^{1}: 782 km (486 mi)
- Surface elevation: 619 m (2,031 ft)
- Settlements: Ntoroko, Kaiso, Butiaba, Wanseko, Panyimur, Mahagi Port, Buliisa and Kasenyi Port
- ^{1} Shore length is not a well-defined measure.

Lake Albert, originally known as Lake Mwitanzige by the Banyoro, Nam Ovoyo Bonyo by the Alur, and temporarily as Lake Mobutu Sese Seko, is a lake located in Uganda and the Democratic Republic of the Congo. It is Africa's sixth-largest lake and the second biggest of Uganda's Great Lakes.

== Geography ==
Lake Albert is located on the border between Uganda and the Democratic Republic of the Congo. It is the northernmost of the chain of lakes in the Albertine Rift, the western branch of the East African Rift.

It is about 160 kilometres (99 mi) long and 30 kilometres (19 mi) across at its widest, with a maximum depth of 51 metres (167 ft), and a surface elevation of 619 metres (2,031 ft) above sea level.

Lake Albert is part of the complicated system of the upper Nile. Its main sources are the White Nile, ultimately coming from Lake Victoria to the southeast, and the Semliki River, which issues from Lake Edward to the southwest. The water of the Victoria Nile is much less saline than that of Lake Albert. The lake's outlet, at its northernmost tip, is the Albert Nile section of the White Nile. The river later becomes known as the Mountain Nile when its course enters South Sudan.

At the southern end of the lake, where the Semliki comes in, there are swamps. The Rwenzori Mountains are to the south of the lake, and to the northwest are the Blue Mountains. The few settlements along the shore include Butiaba and Pakwach.

== Water characteristics ==
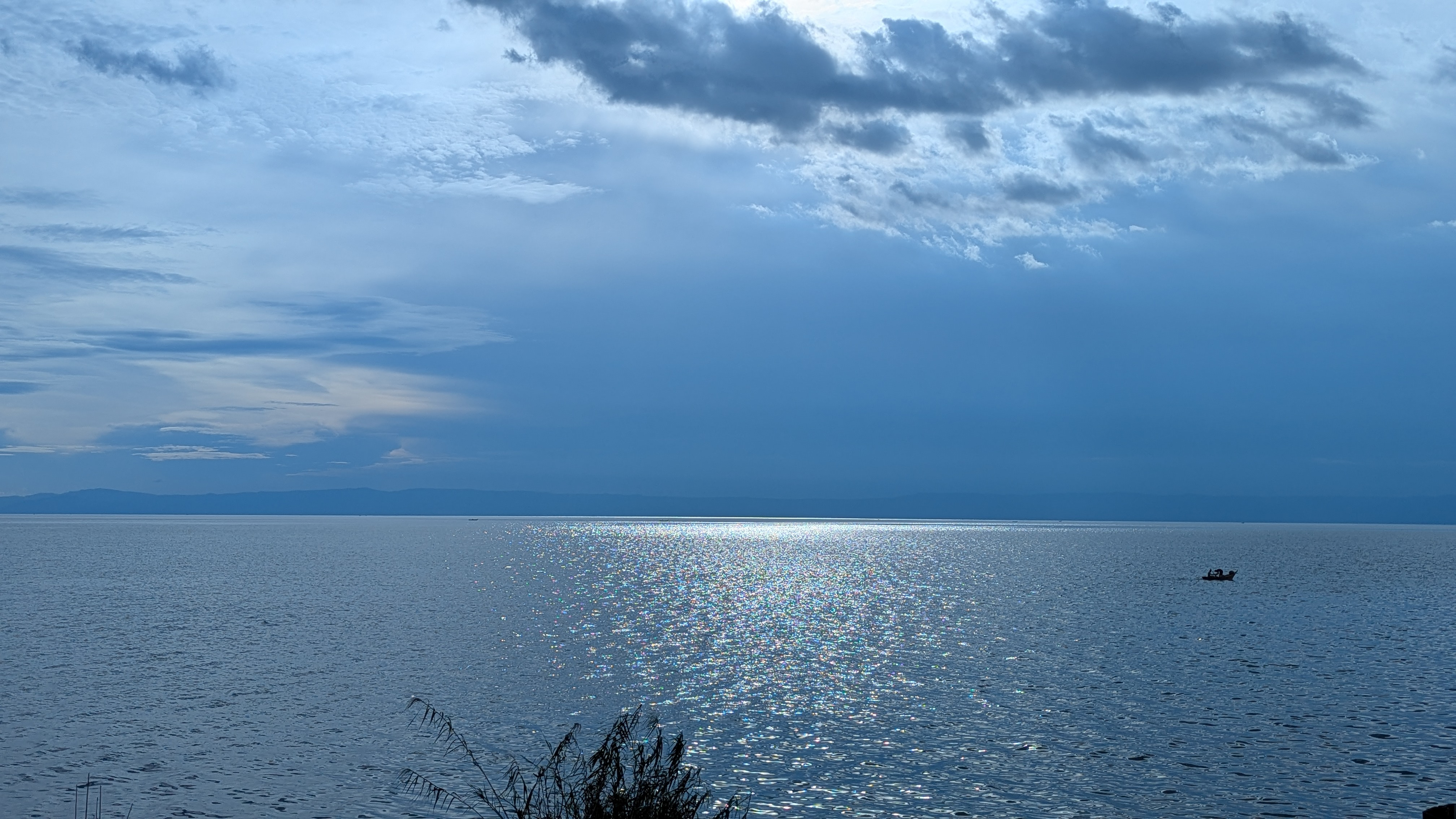
View from the shoreline in Kikuube District, Uganda

Unlike the very deep Lake Malawi, Lake Tanganyika and Lake Kivu, Lake Albert's water temperature is relatively stable throughout, typically around 27–29 °C (81–84 °F), and even its deeper sections contain oxygen.

The water has a pH of around or just below 9 and an electric conductivity of around 720–780 μS/cm. These are both very high for a freshwater lake but nevertheless lower than Lake Edward.

== Animals ==
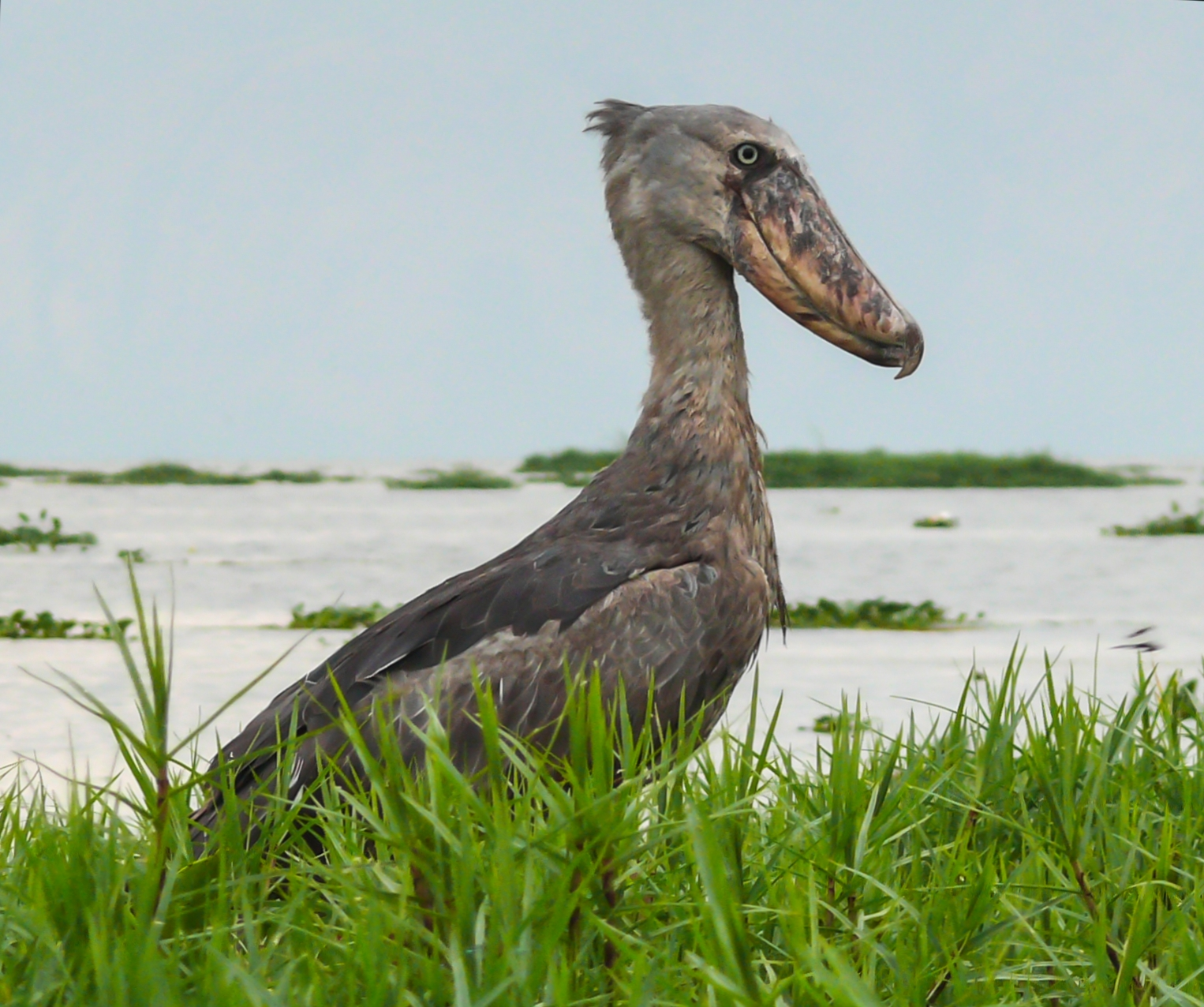
A shoebill photographed at Lake Albert

Lake Albert is home to many aquatic and semi-aquatic animals like hippopotamuses, Uganda kob antelopes, Nile crocodiles, Nile monitors, African softshell turtles, Central African mud turtles, Williams' mud turtles, various semi-aquatic snakes and various frogs. Water birds are numerous and include pelicans, herons and the rare shoebill.

=== Fish and fishing ===
There are 55 fish species in Lake Albert. Except for Nile crocodiles, the largest predator in the lake is the Nile perch (native; unlike in other Rift Valley lakes where introduced and invasive). Other large predatory fish include the elongate tigerfish, African tigerfish, marbled lungfish, cornish jack, Bagrus docmak, African sharptooth catfish and vundu catfish. In addition, there are important fisheries for the Nile tilapia, Niger barb, Albert lates, electric catfish and giraffe catfish that are caught by standard fishing methods, and the small Brycinus nurse and Engraulicypris bredoi that mainly are caught by light fishing. As much as 30% of the fish production in Uganda is from Lake Albert.

Lake Albert has fewer endemics than the other African Great Lakes. Although the Albert Nile–the section of the Nile that leaves Lake Albert—has several rapids in the Nimule region, these have not effectively isolated the lake from the main Nile sections. In contrast, Lake Edward (and ultimately Lake George) is effectively isolated from Lake Albert by the rapids on the Semliki River, while Lake Kyoga (and ultimately Lake Victoria) is effectively isolated from Lake Albert by the Murchison Falls on the Victoria Nile. As a consequence, most of Lake Albert's fish are widespread riverine species also found in the main Nile sections. There are few haplochromine cichlids; a group that is very diverse in other Rift Valley lakes. Of the six haplochromines in Lake Albert, four are endemic (Haplochromis albertianus, H. avium, H. bullatus and H. mahagiensis) and two are also found in the Nile (H. loati and Pseudocrenilabrus multicolor). In comparison, most of the more than 60 haplochromines in Lake Edward–George and most of the roughly 600 haplochromines in Lake Victoria–Kyoga are endemic. The only other endemic fish species in Lake Albert are the small cyprinid Engraulicypris bredoi and the endangered Albert lates.

== History ==
Lake Albert is still known as Mwitanzige by the Banyoro and Batooro, and Nam Ovoyo Bonyo by the Alur as well as other peoples who have inhabited the region for centuries before the colonial age. This name means ‘locust killer’, from omwita ‘killer’ and enzige ‘locusts’ in the Runyoro language, and 'The Lake that has defeated the locusts' in the Alur language, from Nam, 'Lake', Ovoyo, 'has defeated', Bonyo, 'Locusts'. This is due to a local legend that tells how a plague of locusts had destroyed the crops of the people who were living on the eastern shore of the lake, but when they tried to cross to the other side they never got there.

In 1864, the explorers Samuel Baker and Flóra von Sass found the lake and renamed it after the recently deceased Prince Albert, consort of Queen Victoria. In the 20th century, Zairian President Mobutu Sese Seko temporarily named the lake after himself.

European colonialists operated shipping on the lake. The British planned shipping on Lake Albert as part of a network of railway, river steamer and lake steamer services linking British interests in Egypt, east Africa and southern Africa. The John I. Thornycroft & Company shipyard at Wools ton, Hampshire built the cargo and passenger ship SS Robert Coryndon for this purpose in 1930. She was named after the British Army officer Robert Thorne Corydon, who was governor of Uganda 1918–22. Winston Churchill described the ship as "the best library afloat" and Ernest Hemingway called her "magnificence on water". She either was scuttled in 1962 or sank in 1964. She remains unsalvaged and partly submerged in the lake at Butyaba landing site. These can still be seen to date.

Heritage Oil and Tullow Oil have announced major oil finds in the Lake Albert basin, with estimates that the multi-billion barrel field will prove to be the largest onshore field found in sub-Saharan Africa for more than twenty years.

In March 2014, a boat carrying Congolese refugees capsized in Lake Albert, killing more than 250 people.

On 26 December 2016, a boat carrying 45 members and fans of a local village football team capsized in Lake Albert killing at least 30 people.

On 24 December 2020, 30 people died when a boat capsized while travelling from Uganda to the Democratic Republic of the Congo. The passengers were concerned about travel restrictions related to the COVID-19 pandemic in Africa.

The Kibiro settlement on Lake Albert has cultural and archeological significance.

== See also ==
- Energy in Uganda
- Rift Valley
- Oil wells
- semliki
