= Buliisa District =

Ugandan administrative district

- District
- District location in Uganda
- Coordinates: 02°11′N 31°24′E
- Country: Uganda
- Region: Western Uganda
- Sub-region: Bunyoro sub-region
- Capital: Buliisa

Area
  - Land: 1,141 km^{2} (441 sq mi)

Population (2020 Estimate)
  - Total: 149,300
  - Density: 130.9/km^{2} (339/sq mi)
- Time zone: UTC+3 (EAT)
- Website: www.buliisa.go.ug

Buliisa District is a district in Western Uganda. As with most Ugandan districts, Buliisa District is named after its "main town" Buliisa, where the district headquarters are located. Bugungu has 6 sub counties: Kigwera, Ngwedo, Buliisa, Butiaba, Kihungya, and Biiso. It also contain 3 town councils: Buliisa, Butiaba and Biiso.

== Location ==
Buliisa District is bordered by Pakwach District to the northwest, Nwoya District to the northeast, Masindi District to the east, Hoima District to the south and the Democratic Republic of the Congo, across Lake Albert, to the west. The 'main town' in the district, Buliisa, is located approximately 100 kilometres (62 mi), by road, northwest of Masindi, the nearest large town. Buliisa Town is approximately 91 kilometres (57 mi), by road, north of Hoima, the largest city in the Bunyoro sub-region.

According to the UBOS 2024 Census data, Buliisa District consists of 10 Sub-Counties/Town Councils,also divided into parishes. The District has only one county and is Buliisa County.

=== Buliisa County ===
Sub-County/Town Council and their parishes in Buliisa district.

- Biiso Town Council: Biiso Ward, Kahemura, Kampala Ward, Kigungu Ward, Kihuha Ward.
- Biiso Sub-County: Avogera, Kijura, Ndandamire, Nyeramubiri.
- Buliisa Town Council: Boma Ward, Bugoigo, Central Ward, Kitooma Ward.
- Buliisa Sub-County: Biiso, Kasenyi, Kataleeba, Kisansya.
- Butiaba Town Council: Butiaba Ward, Lakeview Ward, Mugenyi Ward.
- Butiaba Sub-County: Booma, Kawaibanda, Wanseko.
- Kigwera Sub-County: Kigwera, Nyamasoga, Nyamiti.
- Kihungya Sub-County: Kihungya, Obana, Wamale.
- Ngwedo Sub-County: Ngwedo, Nyakarongo, Okwngwe.
- Wanseko Town Council: Katana, Wanseko Ward

== Overview ==
Buliisa District was created in 2006 by the Ugandan Parliament. Prior to that, Buliisa District was part of Masindi District. The district is primarily rural and most people in the district are either pastoralists, fisherpeople or subsistence agriculturalists. The district is part of Bunyoro sub-region, which is coterminous with Bunyoro Kingdom. As of October 2020, the districts that comprise Bunyoro Kingdom include: 1. Buliisa District 2. Masindi District 3. Kiryandongo District 4. Hoima District 5. Kikuube District 6. Kakumiro District 7. Kibaale District and 8. Kagadi District.

== Population ==
The 1991 national population census enumerated the population of the district at 47,709. In 2002, the national census conducted that year enumerated the district population at 63,363. On 27 August 2014, the national population census and household survey enumerated the population of Buliisa District at 113,161. In July 2020, the Uganda Bureau of Statistics (UBOS) estimated the mid-year population of the district at 149,300 people. Of these, approximately 78,300 (52.4 percent) were males and approximately 71,000 (47.6 percent) were females. UBOS estimates that the district population grew at an average annual rate of 4.86 percent, between 2014 and 2020.

During the first 20 years of the 2000s, a considerable amount of crude oil deposits have been discovered in the district. The Ugandan Government is in the final stages of preparing to start extracting the oil discovered in Buliisa and the neighboring districts.

== Polish Refugee Camp ==
A Polish refugee camp was established in the area of Nyabyeya (now part of the Nyabyeya Forestry College in the southern part of Buliisa District) as part of the Evacuation of Polish civilians from the USSR in World War II. The refugee camp existed from 1939 to 1948. The Our Lady Queen of Poland Catholic Church and its graveyard are maintained to this day.

== The Tribes in Buliisa ==
Buliisa District is located in the Bunyoro sub-region of western Uganda, along the shores of Lake Albert. The Bagungu are the indigenous and major ethnic group of Buliisa District. They speak Lugungu and have a strong cultural and historical connection with Bugungu, Lake Albert, and the Bunyoro-Kitara Kingdom.

Traditionally, the Bagungu depend mainly on fishing, agriculture, livestock keeping, and small-scale trade for their livelihoods. Their culture is organized around families, clans, traditional customs, sacred sites, and community relationships. Land, forests, water bodies, and other natural resources are very important to their cultural identity and survival.

Although the Bagungu are the major indigenous community, Buliisa has become ethnically diverse due to migration, with communities such as the Alur, Banyoro, Lugbara and others living in the district. The discovery and development of oil in the Albertine region has brought opportunities for employment and development but has also created concerns about land, compensation, environmental protection, fishing, and the preservation of Bagungu cultural heritage.

- Bagungu
- Alur
- Bagungu
- Bunyoro
- Western Uganda
- Uganda Districts

== Economic activity ==
- Matooke
- Beans
- maize
- Fishing
- Transport and communication
- Rice

== Livestock ==
- Cattle
- chicken
- goat

== See also ==
1. Western Region, Uganda
2. Districts of Uganda
3. Parliament of Uganda
