= Hoima–Kinyara–Kafu High Voltage Power Line =

Ugandan high voltage power line

Location
- Country: Uganda
- Coordinates: 01°25′14″N 31°22′22″E
- General direction: West to East
- From: Hoima, Uganda
- To: Kafu, Uganda

Ownership information
- Owner: Government of Uganda
- Partners: The World Bank Group
- Operator: Uganda Electricity Transmission Company Limited

Construction information
- Expected: 2023

Technical information
- Current type: AC
- Total length: 92 km (57 mi)
- AC voltage: 220kV
- No. of circuits: 2

The Hoima–Kinyara–Kafu High Voltage Power Line is a planned high voltage electricity power line, connecting the high voltage substation at Kabaale, Buseruka sub-county, Hoima District, in the Western Region of Uganda to another high voltage substation at Kafu, Nakasongola District, in the Central Region of Uganda. On the way, the power line passes through Kinyara Sugar Works, in Masindi District.

== Location ==
The power line starts in the village of Kabaale, Buseruka sub-county, Hoima District, in the Western Region of Uganda, at a 220kV substation there. The power line would travel in a general north-easterly direction to the Kinyara Sugar Works, in Masindi District, through another 220kV substation there, and continue on to terminate at Kafu, in Nakasongola District, at a 220kV substation that is connected to the Karuma–Kawanda High Voltage Power Line, a total distance of 92 kilometres (57 mi).

== Overview ==
This power line is intended to increase and strengthen the supply of grid electricity to the Western Region of Uganda. The four main objectives are as follows:

The first objective is to connect the region to the 600 megawatts Karuma Hydroelectric Power Station through the connection at Kafu.

The second objective is to pick up co-generation at Kinyara Sugar Works, where energy production is expected to be stepped up from 14 megawatts to 45 megawatts.

The third objective is to pick up any power from the Hoima oil fields, including the proposed 100 megawatts natural gas-fired Nzizi Thermal Power Station.

The fourth objective is to bring power to the Hoima Metropolis including the Uganda Oil Refinery, the Kabaale International Airport, the city of Hoima and the Ugandan end of the East African Crude Oil Pipeline. At its southern end, in Hoima District, this transmission line will connect to the existing 226 kilometres (140 mi), 220kV Nkenda–Fort Portal–Hoima High Voltage Power Line, which was completed in 2018.

== Construction ==
As of 2018, this power line was marked as "Under Procurement". Funding is expected through a loan from the International Development Association, a member of the World Bank Group.

== See also ==
- Eastern Africa Power Pool
- Energy in Uganda
