= Hoima–Kaiso–Tonya Road =

Road in Uganda

Coordinates: 01°35′06″N 31°04′59″E

Route information
- Length: 57 mi (92 km)
- History: Designated in 2011; Upgrading completed in 2014

Major junctions
- East end: Hoima
- West end: Tonya

Location
- Country: Uganda

Highway system
- Roads in Uganda

Hoima–Kaiso–Tonya Road is a road in the Western Region of Uganda, connecting the city of Hoima with the towns of Kaiso and Tonya on the shores of Lake Albert in the oil-rich Albertine Graben.

== Location ==
The road starts at Hoima and continues west through Kaiso, and ends in Tonya, a distance of approximately 92 kilometres (57 mi). The road passes through the village of Kabaale, in Buseruka County, the location of the Uganda Oil Refinery.

== Upgrading to tarmac ==
The upgrading of the road involved the conversion of the existing gravel surface to tarmac and the building of bridges and drainages.

Kolin Insaat Turim Sayani Ve Tecaret, a Turkish construction firm, won the tender to build the road at an estimated cost of USh:320 billion (US$125 million). The construction was fully funded by the government of Uganda. The construction contracts were signed in August 2011.

Construction began in June 2012 and was completed in December 2014.

== See also ==
- Hoima District
- Economy of Uganda
- Uganda–Kenya Crude Oil Pipeline
- List of cities and towns in Uganda
- List of roads in Uganda
