= Uganda–Kenya Crude Oil Pipeline =

Proposed pipeline

Location
- Country: Uganda; Kenya
- Coordinates: 01°33′00″N 31°09′36″E
- Direction: West to East
- Start: Hoima, Uganda
- Passes through: Lokichar, Kenya
- To: Lamu, Kenya

General information
- Type: Oil pipeline
- Partners: Tullow Oil; TotalEnergies; CNOOC
- Commissioned: 2020 (Expected)

Technical information
- Length: 930 mi (1,500 km)

The Uganda–Kenya Crude Oil Pipeline (UKCOP) was a proposed pipeline to transport crude oil from Uganda's oil fields in the Northern and Western Regions to the Kenyan port of Lamu on the Indian Ocean. Along the way, the pipeline would have picked up more crude oil from the South Lokichar Basin and other oil fields in northwestern Kenya and delivered it to Lamu for export. South Sudan had also planned to construct a pipeline from its Unity State, linking to the UKCOP as an alternative to its only current oil export route through Port Sudan in its northern neighbor Sudan.

== Location ==
The pipeline was to originate in the oil-rich Kaiso-Tonya area, west of the town of Hoima, in western Uganda and snake its way through the northwestern Kenyan town of Lokicor to end at Lamu, on the Indian Ocean. In August 2015, the presidents of Kenya and Uganda agreed on the proposed route of the pipeline. The route, as proposed by the selected consultant, was 1,500 kilometres (930 mi) long.

== Background ==
Uganda has proven crude oil reserves of 6.5 billion barrels, about 2.2 billion of which is recoverable. The country has the fourth-largest oil reserves in sub-Saharan Africa, behind Nigeria, Angola, and South Sudan. Buseruka Subcounty in Hoima District has been selected to be the location of Uganda's only oil refinery. The country's strategy is to build a refinery that meets the petroleum products needs of Uganda and its regional neighbors and to export the rest of crude oil production via a pipeline to Lamu.

From the beginning, the preference of the Ugandan government had been to start with a small production capacity refinery to prolong the production longevity of its new oil discoveries. Initially, this preference conflicted with the wishes of the three major exploration companies in the country, which preferred rapid harvesting and export of the crude via pipeline to the Kenyan coast. After much recrimination, in April 2013 the government agreed with Tullow Oil of the United Kingdom, TotalEnergies of France, and the China National Offshore Oil Corporation (CNOOC) to build both the oil refinery and the pipeline.

== Construction ==
The route would have covered approximately 850 kilometres (530 mi) inside Kenya, with most of the route underground.

The pipeline would have been heated and would have used pump stations along the way. Because of the waxy nature of the oil found in both countries, it would have remained solid below 40 °C (104 °F).

The three east African governments of Kenya and Uganda agreed in principle to construct this pipeline. In June 2014, the three countries advertised for a single consultant and transaction adviser to oversee the feasibility studies and construction design for the pipeline. A single consultant was preferred to maintain consistency in quality across the entire pipeline in Uganda and Kenya. In November 2014, Kenya and Uganda jointly selected Toyota Tsusho as the consultant for the pipeline. A contractor was expected to be selected in January 2015.

== Change of plans ==
In March 2016, the presidents of Tanzania and Uganda jointly announced plans to build a competing pipeline, the Uganda–Tanzania Crude Oil Pipeline. With these new developments, Kenya is expected to go alone in building its own pipeline from Lochichar to Port Lamu.

== See also ==
- Uganda Oil Refinery
- Uganda National Oil Company
- Petroleum Authority of Uganda
- Kenya Crude Oil Pipeline
- Kenya-Uganda-Rwanda Petroleum Products Pipeline
