= Kibulala, Hoima =

- Location in Uganda
- Coordinates: 01°09′00″N 31°00′00″E
- Country: Uganda
- Region: Western Region
- Sub-region: Bunyoro sub-region
- District: Hoima District
- Elevation: 4,000 ft (1,220 m)

Kibulala, Hoima, commonly referred to as "Kibulala", is a hill in Hoima District in the Western Region of Uganda. The name also refers to the human settlement that sits on that hill.

== Location ==
Kibulala, Hoima is approximately 62 kilometres (39 mi), by road, south-west of Hoima, the nearest large city and the location of the district headquarters, off the Hoima-Kyenjojo road. This location is approximately 250 kilometres (160 mi), by road, west of Kampala, the capital and largest city of Uganda. The approximate coordinates of Kibulala, Hoima are 1°09'00.0"N, 31°00'00.0"E (Latitude:1.1500; Longitude:31.0000).

== See also ==
- Kaiso, Uganda
- Tonya, Uganda
- Bunyoro
