= Kaiso, Uganda =

Kaiso
- Map of Uganda showing the location of Kaiso; Placement on map is approximate.
- Coordinates: 01°31′48″N 30°57′58″E
- Country: Uganda
- Region: Western Uganda
- Sub-region: Bunyoro sub-region
- District: Hoima District
- Elevation: 640 m (2,100 ft)
- Time zone: UTC+3 (EAT)

Kaiso is a settlement in Western Uganda.

== Location ==
Kaiso is located on the eastern shores of Lake Albert, in Hoima District. It lies approximately 61 kilometres (38 mi), by road, west of the district headquarters at Hoima, along the Hoima–Kaiso–Tonya Road. This location is approximately 258 kilometres (160 mi), by road, northwest of Kampala, Uganda's capital and largest city. The coordinates of Kaiso are:1°31'48.0"N, 30°57'58.0"E (Latitude:1.5300; Longitude:30.9661).

== Overview ==
Kaiso lies in the oil-rich Albertine Graben. Tullow Oil, one of the international oil companies prospecting in the area has built social enterprise infrastructure in or near Kaiso, worth US$2.6 million, including Kyehoro Maternity Health Centre, Sebagoro Health Centre III, Kaiso Primary School, and Kyehoro Primary School.

== See also ==
- Tonya, Uganda
- Nzizi Power Station
- Uganda Oil Refinery
- Uganda-Kenya Crude Oil Pipeline
- Hoima–Kampala Petroleum Products Pipeline
