= Kabalega Petrochemical Industrial Park =

Industrial and business park in Uganda

- Map of Uganda showing the location of KPCIP
- Coordinates: 01°28′45″N 31°06′51″E
- Country: Uganda
- District: Hoima
- Town: Kabaale

Area
  - Total: 29.57 km^{2} (11.42 sq mi)
- Time zone: UTC+3 (EAT)

The Kabalega Petrochemical Industrial Park (KPCIP), also referred to as Kabalega Business and Industrial Park or Kabalega Industrial Park, is an industrial and business park under development in Uganda. The park is being developed by the Uganda National Oil Company (UNOC). The park comprises Kabalega International Airport, Uganda Oil Refinery, the EACOP Oil Export Hub, petrochemical industries, fertilizer factories and others.

== Location ==
KPCIP is located on 29.57 square kilometres (11.42 mi^{2}) in Kabaale, Buseruka sub-county Hoima District. This location is approximately 45 kilometres (28 mi), by road, west of the central business district of Hoima City, the nearest large urban centre.

== Overview ==
In 2018, the government of Uganda acquired the land where the industrial business park is under development. The plan is to develop the industrial park with a private joint venture (JV) partner, yet to be identified. The Uganda National Oil Company was selected as the lead government agency responsible for coordination and supervision of the park.

In April 2025, UNOC began to make arrangements in collaboration with the Kingdom of Bunyoro to relocate and rebury over 1,800 bodies to pave way for development of the park. "While the affected families received compensation, many did not exhume or relocate the bodies of their loved ones".

== Recent developments ==
In April 2025, the government of Uganda formally determined and set the land rates payable by prospective businesses in the park at US$1.5 (UGX:5,560) per square meter, per year.

== See also ==
- Uganda Oil Refinery Project
- Kabaale Industrial Park (KIP) – Key Facts. as at 24 April 2024.
