= Bwendero Sugar Factory =

Sugar factory in Uganda

Coordinates: 01°30′58″N 31°21′30″E

- Type: Private
- Industry: Manufacture & distribution of sugar
- Headquarters: Bwendero, Hoima District, Uganda
- Key people: John Fitzgerald Magara, Executive Chairman of Bwendero Sugar Company Limited
- Products: Sugar
- Total assets: US$6 million (2018)

Bwendero Sugar Factory (BSF) is a sugar manufacturing establishment, under development in the Western Region of Uganda.

== Location ==
The factory and sugar plantation would be located north of the town of Hoima, in the Village of Bwendero, in Kiragura Parish, Kitoba sub-county, in Hoima District, approximately 15 kilometres (9 mi), by road, north of Hoima, off of the Hoima–Kigorobya Road.

== Overview ==
The factory, under construction as of September 2018, is expected to be commissioned in December 2018. It has a nucleus plantation of 750 hectares (1,900 acres) of raw sugar cane.

According to the Daily Monitor, the factory cost USh22 billion (US$6 million), to build. Funding was raised through equity and debt. It has capacity of 1,000 metric tonnes of crushing capacity per day, producing approximately 25,000 tonnes (25,000,000 kg) of sugar powder annually.

== Ownership ==
Bwendero Sugar Factory is owned by John Fitzgerald Magara, a Hoima-based businessman, who is also the proprietor of Bwendero Dairy Farm. BSF was the 13th sugar manufacturer to be licensed in Uganda.

== See also ==
- List of sugar manufacturers in Uganda
