= Economy of Uganda =

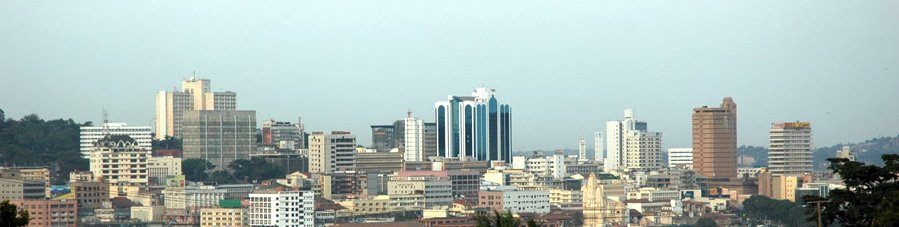
- Kampala, the financial centre of Uganda
- Currency: Ugandan shilling (USh)
- Fiscal year: 1 July – 30 June
- Trade organisations: AU, EAC, COMESA, WTO
- Country group: Least Developed; Low-income economy

Statistics
- GDP: ▲$64.28 billion (nominal; 2025); ▲$187.11 billion (PPP; 2025)
- GDP rank: 88th (nominal; 2025); 82nd (PPP; 2025)
- GDP growth: ▲6.3% (2024); ▲6.1% (2025)
- GDP per capita: ▲$1,340 (nominal; 2025); ▲$3,900 (PPP; 2025)
- GDP per capita rank: 160th (nominal; 2025); 161st (PPP; 2025)
- GDP per capita growth: 3.2% (2024)
- GDP by sector: Agriculture: 71.9%; Industry: 4.4%; Services: 23.7%; (2017 est.)
- Inflation (CPI): 3.2% (2019)
- Base borrowing rate: 19.1% (31 December 2017 est.)
- Population below national poverty line: 21.4% (2017 est.); 41.7% on less than $1.90/day (2016)
- Gini coefficient: 42.8 medium (2016)
- Human Development Index: ▼0.525 low (2021) (166th); ▲0.396 low IHDI (2021)
- Labour force: ▲16,833,878 (2019); 48.0% employment rate (2017)
- Labour force by occupation: Agriculture: 71%; Industry: 7%; Services: 22%; (2013 est.)
- Informal employment: 90% (2021)
- Main industries: Sugar processing, brewing, tobacco, cotton textiles, cement, steel production

External
- Exports: ▲$3.339 billion (2017 est.)
- Export goods: coffee, fish and fish products, tea, cotton, flowers, horticultural products, gold
- Main export partners: Kenya 17.7%; UAE 16.7%; DR Congo 6.6%; Rwanda 6.1%; Tanzania 4.8%; (2017)
- Imports: ▲$5.036 billion (2017 est.)
- Import goods: Capital equipment, vehicles, petroleum, medical supplies, cereals
- Main import partners: China 17.4%; India 13.4%; UAE 12.2%; Kenya 7.9%; Japan 6.4%; Saudi Arabia 6.3%; Indonesia 4.4%; South Africa 4.1%; (2017)
- FDI stock: $10.909 billion (2016)
- Current account: ▼ −$1.212 billion (2017 est.)
- Gross external debt: $7.163 billion (31 December 2017 est.)

Public finance
- Government debt: $25.3 billion ($11.7 billion, domestic) (2023)
- Foreign reserves: ▲$3.654 billion (31 December 2017 est.)
- Budget balance: –4.1% (of GDP) (2017 est.)
- Revenue: $3.98 billion (2017)
- Spending: $7.66 billion (2017)
- Economic aid: $3.68 billion (2017)
- Credit rating: Standard & Poor's: ▼ B
- All values, unless otherwise stated, are in US dollars.

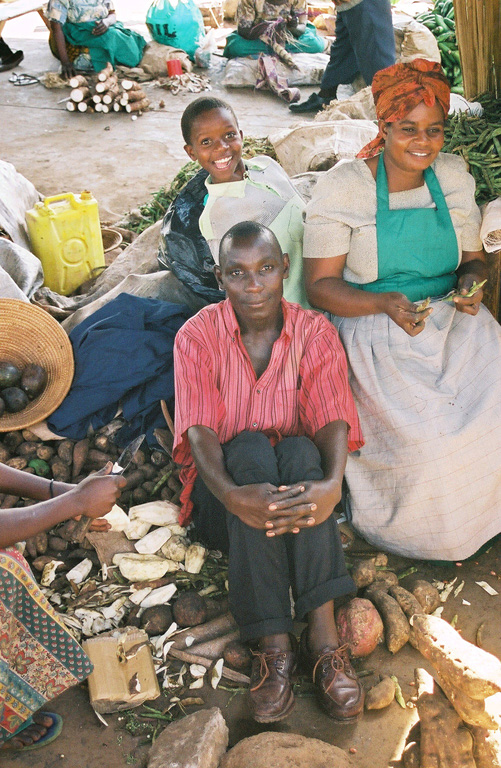
A family in a market in Kampala

Uganda is a low-income country with excellent potential for growth. It is endowed with significant natural resources, including ample fertile land, regular rainfall, and mineral deposits.

Chronic political instability and erratic economic management since the implementation of self-rule has produced a record of persistent economic decline that has left Uganda among of the world's poorest and least-developed countries. The national energy needs have historically exceeded the domestic energy generation, though large petroleum reserves have been found in the western region of the country.

After the turmoil of the Amin period, the country began a program of economic recovery in 1981 that received considerable foreign assistance. From mid-1984 onward, overly expansionist fiscal and monetary policies and the renewed outbreak of civil strife led to a setback in economic performance.

The economy has grown since the 1990s; real gross domestic product (GDP) grew at an average of 6.7% annually during the period 1990–2015, whereas real GDP per capita grew at 3.3% per annum during the same period. During this period, the Ugandan economy experienced economic transformation: the share of agriculture value added in GDP declined from 56% in 1990 to 24% in 2015; the share of industry grew from 11% to 20% (with manufacturing increasing at a slower pace, from 6% to 9% of GDP); and the share of services went from 32% to 55%.

== Currency ==
Uganda began issuing its own currency in 1966 through the Bank of Uganda.

== Agriculture ==
Agricultural products supply a significant portion of Uganda's foreign exchange earnings, with coffee alone, of which Uganda is Africa's second largest producer after Ethiopia, accounting for about 17% of the country's exports in 2017 and earning the country US$545 million. Exports of apparel, hides, skins, vanilla, vegetables, fruits, cut flowers, and fish are growing, while cotton, tea, and tobacco continue to be mainstays.

Uganda produced in 2018:

- 3.9 million tons of sugarcane
- 3.8 million tons of plantain (4th largest producer in the world, losing only to Congo, Ghana and Cameroon)
- 2.9 million tons of maize
- 2.6 million tons of cassava
- 1.5 million tons of sweet potato (7th largest producer in the world)
- 1.0 million tons of bean
- 1.0 million tons of vegetable
- 532 thousand tons of banana
- 360 thousand tons of onion
- 298 thousand tons of sorghum
- 260 thousand tons of rice
- 245 thousand tons of sunflower seed
- 242 thousand tons of peanut
- 211 thousand tons of coffee (10th largest producer in the world)
- 209 thousand tons of millet

In addition, there are smaller productions of other agricultural products, like cotton (87 thousand tons), tea (62 thousand tons), tobacco (35 thousand tons) and cocoa (27 thousand tons).

== Manufacturing ==
The Ugandan manufacturing sector is dominated by agro-processing, food and beverages, household products, construction materials and fast-moving consumer goods. Most firms are small and medium enterprises concentrated in Kampala and the Central Region. Most products manufactured in Uganda are aimed at domestic consumption, and exports are limited to the regional markets in East Africa, including Rwanda, Burundi, South Sudan, Democratic Republic of the Congo (DRC), and the regions of Kenya and Tanzania bordering Uganda.

Manufacturing was reported to account for 15.8% of GDP in 2020, according to the World Bank, employing about 6.622% of formal-sector labour.

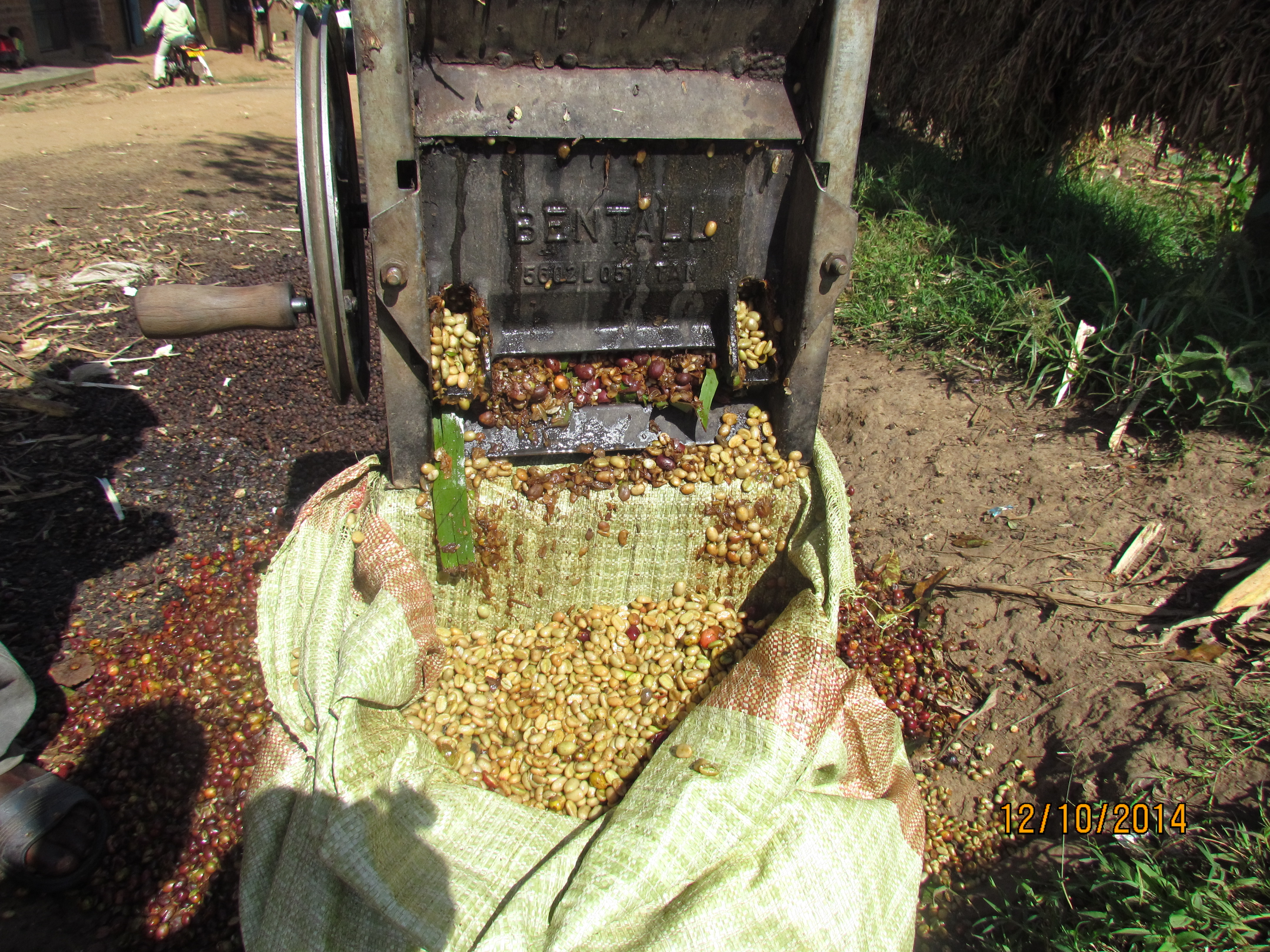
Coffee pulping process

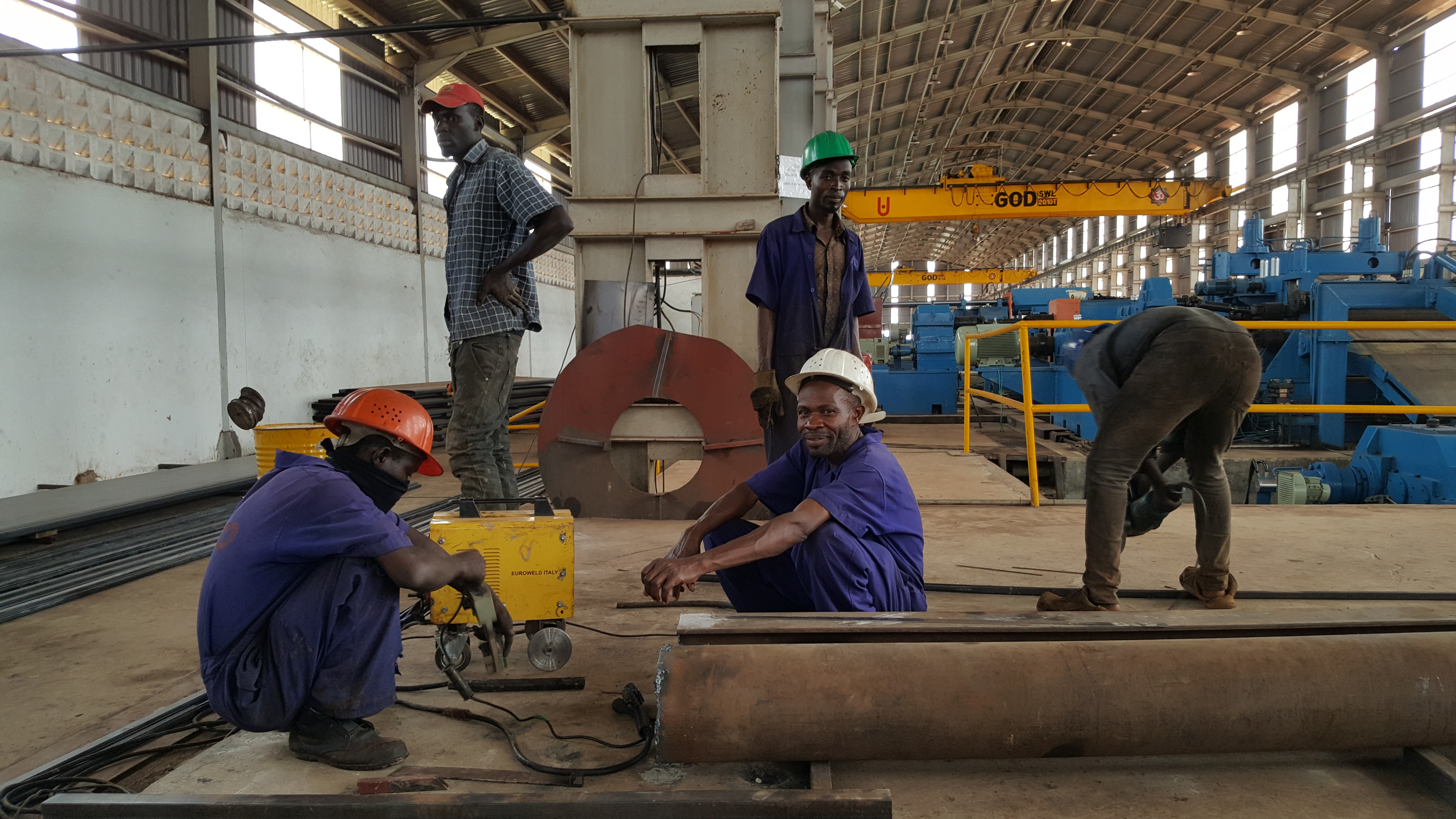
A steel works in Jinja

Annual production levels 2016–2020
Sector	Weight	2016	2017	2018	2019	2020	Pct. change 2018–2019	Pct. change 2019–2020
Total manufacturing	1000	234.67	245.29	268.34	277.69	285.91	3.5	3
Food processing	400	211.57	204.14	264.04	251.64	239.79	-4.7	-4.7
Drinks and tobacco	210	282.89	313.34	324.91	363.34	346.13	11.8	-4.7
Textiles, clothing and footwear	43	153.37	166.97	170.48	204.08	252.78	19.7	23.9
Sawmilling, paper and printing	35	250.56	295.68	324.51	296.62	273.35	-8.6	-7.8
Chemicals, paint, soap and foam products	97	292.25	346.41	261.21	316.73	363.47	21.3	14.8
Bricks and cement	75	290.01	295.26	336.88	345.66	463.4	2.6	34.1
Metal products	83	162.94	168.53	154.13	149.5	162.78	-3	8.2
Miscellaneous	66	214.24	202.25	230.61	238.02	248.84	3.2	4.5

Uganda's industrial performance comparisons 2018 (World Bank)
	Ethiopia	Kenya	Vietnam	Uganda
Industry contribution to GDP (%)	27.3	16.4	34.2	19.9
Share of manufactured exports to total exports (%)	13	28	83	23
Manufacturing value added (%)	5.8	7.7	16.0	8.3
Share of employment (%)	12	7.6	25.8	7.4

== Transportation ==
As of 2017, Uganda had about 130,000 kilometres (80,778 mi) of roads, with approximately 5,300 kilometres (3,293 mi) (4 percent) paved. Most paved roads radiate from Kampala, the country's capital and largest city.

As of 2017, Uganda's metre gauge railway network measures about 1,250 kilometres (777 mi) in length. Of this, about 56% (700 kilometres (435 mi)), is operational. A railroad originating at Mombasa on the Indian Ocean connects with Tororo, where it branches westward to Jinja, Kampala, and Kasese and northward to Mbale, Soroti, Lira, Gulu, and Pakwach. The only railway line still operating, however, is the one to Kampala.

Uganda's important link to the port of Mombasa is now mainly by road, which serves its transport needs and also those of neighboring Rwanda, Burundi, parts of the Democratic Republic of the Congo, and South Sudan.

An international airport is at Entebbe on the northern shores of Lake Victoria, about 41 kilometres (25 mi) south of Kampala. In January 2018, the government of Uganda began the construction of Kabalega International Airport, in the Western Region of Uganda. This will be Uganda's second international airport, which is planned to facilitate the construction of an oil refinery and boost tourism.

The transport union Amalgamated Transport and General Workers Union (ATWGU) is one of the more powerful trade unions in the country with about 100,000 members, many of whom are informal workers.

== Communications ==
The Uganda Communications Commission regulates communications, primarily "delivered through an enabled private sector." The companies it regulates include television networks, radio stations, mobile network operators, and fixed-line telephone companies.

== Mining and petroleum ==
Uganda's predominant mineral occurrences are gold, tungsten, tin, beryl, and tantalite in the south; tungsten, clay, and granite between latitude zero and two degrees north; and gold, mica, copper, limestone, and iron in the north.

In late 2012, the government of Uganda was taken to court over value added tax that it placed on goods and services purchased by Tullow Oil, a foreign oil company operating in the country at the time. The court case was heard at an international court based in the United States. The Ugandan government insisted that Tullow could not claim taxes on supplies as recoverable costs before oil production starts. Sources from within the government reveal that the main concern at present is the manner in which millions of dollars have been lost in the past decade, money that could allegedly have stayed in Uganda for investment in the public sector; a Global Financial Integrity report recently revealed that illicit money flows from Uganda between 2001 and 2012 totalled $680 million. Tullow Oil was represented in the court case by Kampala Associated Advocates, whose founder is Elly Kurahanga, the President of Tullow Uganda. A partner at Kampala Associated Advocates, Peter Kabatsi, was also Uganda's solicitor general between 1990 and 2002, and he has denied claims that he negotiated contracts with foreign oil firms during his time in this role.

In June 2015, the Ugandan government and Tullow Oil settled a longstanding dispute regarding the amount of certain capital gains taxes that the company owed to the government. The government claimed that the company owed US$435 million. The claim, however, was settled for US$250 million.

In April 2018, the government signed agreements with Albertine Graben Refinery Consortium, an International consortium led by General Electric of the United States, to build a 60,000 barrels-per-day Uganda Oil Refinery in Western Uganda. The cost of the development is budgeted at about US$4 billion.

== International trade and finance ==
Exports of Uganda by product category (2019) Chemical products Transportation Machines Mineral products Plastics and rubbers Metals Foodstuffs Precious metals Textiles Instruments Animal products Vegetable products Paper goods Footwear and headwear Miscellaneous Stone and glass Wood products Animal and vegetable bi-products Animal hides Arts and antiques Weapons

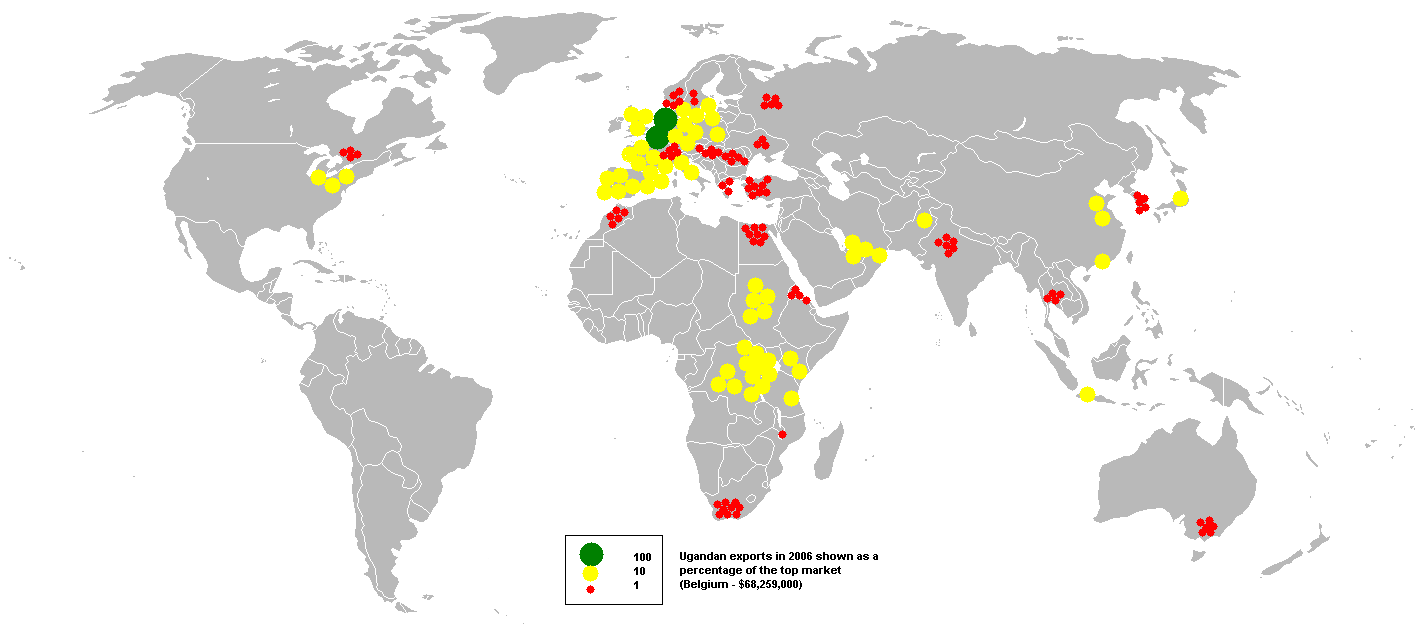
Ugandan export destinations in 2006

Since assuming power in early 1986, Museveni's government has taken important steps toward economic rehabilitation. The country's infrastructure, notably its transport and communications systems which were destroyed by war and neglect, is being rebuilt. Recognizing the need for increased external support, Uganda negotiated a policy framework paper with the IMF and the World Bank in 1987. Uganda subsequently began implementing economic policies designed to restore price stability and sustainable balance of payments, improve capacity utilization, rehabilitate infrastructure, restore producer incentives through proper price policies, and improve resource mobilization and allocation in the public sector. These so-called Structural Adjustment Programs greatly improved the shape of the Ugandan economy, but did not lead to economic growth in the first decade after their implementation. Since 1995, Uganda has experienced rapid economic growth, but it is not clear to what extent this positive development can be attributed to Structural Adjustment. Uganda has been a member of the World Trade Organization, since January 1st 1995 and a member of the General Agreement on Tariffs and Trade, since October 25th 1962.

== Women in the economy ==
The informal economy, which is predominantly female, is broadly defined as a group of vulnerable individuals without protections in regards to their work. Women face a plethora of barriers specific to gender when attempting to access the formal economy of Uganda, and research revealed prejudice against lending to women in the informal sector. The agriculture sector of the Ugandan economy, which composes roughly 40% of the country's GDP, is largely fulfilled by women laborers, especially in managing products, marketing, and the crop sub-sector. 76% of women work in the agriculture sector and roughly 66% of men do, and women provide for 80% of food crops and 60% of traditional exports such as coffee or tea. In the formal, non-agricultural economy, men constitute 61% of the workforce, whereas women predominate the informal economy, and this can be attributed to the lack of equity between men and women in the country. The Uganda Bureau of Statistics reported, when looking at the urban workforce in 2015, 88.6% of women were employed informally, and 84.2% of men were. Women are unable to enter into certain sectors, especially in the formal economy, due to the inability to provide substantial initial funding, and remain in the trade and service sectors of the economy. Comparatively, men dominate the more profitable sectors, such as manufacturing. Women traders make up 70% of those in markets and 40% in shops in addition to dominating other sectors such as the service industry, crafts, and tailoring.

Women are often undervalued in data compilation, particularly when considering their role in their domestic home lives. For example, women commonly match the contribution of their husbands to their familial income, if not provide more, when taking into consideration the value of their labor and the profits made from selling excess food. Urban women on average earn between 50% and 70% of a household's income. Women are also discredited in data collection due to biases of data collectors resulting in inaccurate reports, as well as income being measured per house, rather than separating by gender. The barriers women face in furthering their entrepreneurial careers are different from those faced by men; this is inherent in the biased culture and institutions plaguing Uganda despite the passing of somewhat progressive policies, especially with the 1985 transition of government to the National Resistance Movement party.

== GDP per capita ==
=== GDP per capita (PPP) according to Madisson ===
Historical evolution of GDP per capita (PPP) of Uganda during the period 1950-2005 (expressed in dollars)

Source: Maddison Historical Statistics Project

Historical evolution of GDP per capita (PPP) of Uganda during the period 1985-2040 (expressed in dollars)

Source: Maddison Historical Statistics Project

A 2013 report estimated that malnutrition costs Uganda US$899 million each year, equivalent to about 5.6% of GDP.

== Data ==
Year	GDP (in bil. US$ PPP)	GDP per capita (in US$ PPP)	GDP (in bil. US$ nominal)	GDP growth (real)	Inflation rate (in Percent)	Government debt (in % of GDP)
1980	4.7	416	7.5	▼-3.4%	▲99.2%	n/a
1981	▲5.3	▲459	▲12.1	▲3.9%	▲100.0%	n/a
1982	▲6.1	▲512	▼8.4	▲8.2%	▲100.0%	n/a
1983	▲6.7	▲541	▲9.6	▲4.9%	▲150.0%	n/a
1984	▲6.7	▼527	▼7.4	▼-3.0%	▲16.7%	n/a
1985	▲6.7	▼510	▼6.8	▼-3.0%	▲100.0%	n/a
1986	▲6.9	▼507	▼6.7	▲0.9%	▲143.8%	n/a
1987	▲7.4	▲521	▲10.9	▲4.0%	▲215.4%	n/a
1988	▲8.3	▲563	▲11.3	▲8.3%	▲166.7%	n/a
1989	▲9.1	▲600	▼9.1	▲6.4%	▲130.8%	n/a
1990	▲10.1	▲639	▼7.5	▲6.5%	▲45.4%	n/a
1991	▲10.6	▲649	▼3.9	▲1.8%	▲20.8%	n/a
1992	▲11.5	▲681	▼3.6	▲5.9%	▲42.2%	n/a
1993	▲12.6	▲719	▲4.3	▲6.7%	▲30.0%	n/a
1994	▲13.8	▲766	▲6.2	▲7.7%	▲5.8%	n/a
1995	▲15.4	▲827	▲7.5	▲9.2%	▲6.8%	n/a
1996	▲16.7	▲869	▲7.7	▲6.6%	▲7.5%	n/a
1997	▲17.8	▲896	▲8.4	▲4.6%	▲7.7%	44.2%
1998	▲19.1	▲932	▼8.2	▲6.1%	▲5.8%	▲45.1%
1999	▲20.9	▲989	▼7.8	▲8.0%	▲5.8%	▲47.7%
2000	▲22.2	▲1,017	▼7.8	▲3.9%	▲3.4%	▲48.5%
2001	▲24.7	▲1,095	▲7.8	▲8.8%	▲1.9%	▲51.4%
2002	▲26.8	▲1,153	▲8.4	▲7.1%	▼-0.3%	▲54.7%
2003	▲29.0	▲1,204	▲8.7	▲6.2%	▲8.7%	▲55.1%
2004	▲31.6	▲1,264	▲10.8	▲5.8%	▲3.7%	▼49.0%
2005	▲35.8	▲1,388	▲12.5	▲10.0%	▲8.6%	▼42.6%
2006	▲39.5	▲1,481	▲14.1	▲7.0%	▲7.2%	▼27.8%
2007	▲43.8	▲1,588	▲17.5	▲8.1%	▲6.1%	▼17.0%
2008	▲49.4	▲1,727	▲22.4	▲10.4%	▲12.0%	▼15.7%
2009	▲53.7	▲1,816	▲24.1	▲8.1%	▲13.0%	▼14.8%
2010	▲58.4	▲1,913	▲24.7	▲7.5%	▲4.0%	▲18.4%
2011	▲64.2	▲2,034	▲27.5	▲7.7%	▲18.7%	▼18.0%
2012	▲66.9	▲2,055	▲30.9	▲2.3%	▲14.0%	▲19.5%
2013	▲70.7	▲2,110	▲32.3	▲3.9%	▲5.5%	▲22.1%
2014	▲76.1	▲2,206	▲34.8	▲5.7%	▲4.3%	▲24.8%
2015	▲82.9	▲2,336	▼30.1	▲8.0%	▲3.7%	▲28.0%
2016	▲83.8	▼2,293	▲30.2	▲0.2%	▲5.2%	▲31.3%
2017	▲91.1	▲2,419	▲31.6	▲6.8%	▲5.6%	▲33.6%
2018	▲101.3	▲2,608	▲34.1	▲5.6%	▲2.5%	▲35.0%
2019	▲111.3	▲2,796	▲37.9	▲7.6%	▲2.1%	▲38.0%
2020	▲113.8	▼2,760	▼37.9	▼-1.2%	▲2.8%	▲46.8%
2021	▲127.6	▲3,006	▲42.8	▲5.5%	▲2.2%	▲50.3%
2022	▲145.1	▲3,314	▲47.3	▲6.2%	▲7.2%	▼49.9%
2023	▲158.0	▲3,495	▲52.0	▲5.0%	▲5.4%	▲50.4%
2024	▲171.7	▲3,682	▲57.1	▲6.0%	▲3.3%	▲51.8%
2025	▲188.4	▲3,924	▲66.0	▲6.7%	▲3.6%	▲54.2%
2026	▲208.4	▲4,192	▲73.4	▲7.5%	▲4.0%	▲55.0%

Source: IMF Figures for 2025 include IMF estimates; figures for 2026 are IMF projections (April 2026).

== See also ==
- Ministry of Finance, Planning and Economic Development (Uganda)
- Uganda Investment Authority
- Uganda Securities Exchange
- Banking in Uganda
- List of cement manufacturers in Uganda
- List of sugar manufacturers in Uganda
- Tourism in Uganda
- Poverty in Uganda
- United Nations Economic Commission for Africa
- Economy of East Africa
