= Kenya Crude Oil Pipeline =

Proposed oil pipeline in Kenya

- Kenya Map of Kenya Crude Oil Pipeline

Location
- Country: Kenya
- Coordinates: 00°29′06″S 39°41′12″E
- Direction: North to South
- Start: Lokichar, Kenya
- Passes through: Garissa, Kenya
- To: Lamu, Kenya

General information
- Type: Oil pipeline
- Partners: Government of Kenya & Tullow Oil
- Commissioned: 2025 (Expected)

Technical information
- Length: 554 mi (892 km)

Kenya Crude Oil Pipeline, also Lokichar–Lamu Crude Oil Pipeline, is a proposed crude-oil pipeline in Kenya. The pipeline will originate in the oil-rich South Lokichar Basin, near the town of Lokichar, in northwest Kenya to end at Port Lamu, on the Indian Ocean. The route will remain as originally planned in the Uganda–Kenya Crude Oil Pipeline, in August 2015. The route, was proposed by Toyota Tsusho, the consultant selected by the two governments of that now-abandoned project.

== Overview ==
Kenya has confirmed crude oil deposits of at least 750 million barrels. Originally Kenya partnered with Uganda to export that oil through a joint pipeline to Port Lamu on the Indian Ocean coast. When those plans fell through, Kenya announced it would build ts own pipeline from Lokichar to Lamu. The projected length of this pipeline is about 891 kilometres (554 mi)

The pipeline would carry anywhere from 80,000 to 120,000 barrels of crude oil every 24 hours, using 50 MW of electricity. At that rate, the available known reserves would last about 20 years.

== Cost and timeline ==
In November 2016, the British oil conglomerate, Tullow Oil Plc, indicated that it would sign an agreement with the Government of Kenya, before the end of 2016, which would pave the way for the construction of the 865 kilometres (537 mi) pipeline. The joint venture will involve African Oil Limited and Maersk Oil, two other companies with oil exploration rights in northwestern Kenya. The joint venture agreement (JDA) will be followed by studies on the pipeline's technical requirements as well as its financing and ownership structure. Once the Joint Venture Agreement is executed, other studies can begin, including the Front End Engineering Design (FEED), the Environmental and Social Impact Assessments (ESIA) and "studies on pipeline financing and ownership”. The agreement was signed on 24 October 2017.

It was expected that the construction of this pipeline would commence in 2018 and last until 2021. The construction cost was budgeted at KES:210 billion.

== New developments ==
In January 2018, TotalEnergies, announced its commitment to invest and become a shareholder in this pipeline, as well as in new oilfields in the Turkana exploration region. This represented a "change of mind" by the French oil conglomerate, which in 2016, strongly recommended against development of a pipeline along this route.

In April 2018, the government of Kenya selected Wood Group Plc, a multinational energy services company based in Aberdeen, Scotland, to carry out the FEED engineering for the pipeline. The design work is expected to take eight months. Until the pipeline is built, trucks carry 2,000 barrels per day to Lamu for export and international testing.

In November 2018, Business Daily Africa reported that the government of Kenya was seeking 20 percent shareholding in the company that will own this pipeline through the Kenya Pipeline Company at an estimated cost of KSh22.6 billion (US$226 million). The construction cost of the pipeline has been revised down to US$1.1 billion (KSh113 billion), from US$2.1 billion (US$214 billion). Besides the construction of the pipeline, other related infrastructure including roads, to link to the pipeline will have to be built, at an estimated cost id US$1.9 billion (KSh194 billion). A final investment decision on pipeline plans was expected in 2019.

== See also ==
- Uganda–Kenya Crude Oil Pipeline
- Uganda–Tanzania Crude Oil Pipeline
