= Kibulala =

Kibulala may refer to one of the following:

- Kibulala, Hoima - A hill in Hoima District, Western Uganda.
- Kibulala, Ssingo - A hill in Ssingo County, Kiboga District, Central Uganda.
