= PEAP =

PEAP might be an acronym or abbreviation for:

- Protected Extensible Authentication Protocol, a security protocol in computer security
- Personal Egress Air Packs
- Poverty Eradication Action Plan in Uganda
- Proactive Employee Assistance Program
