= Tonya, Uganda =

Tonya
- Location of Tonya on the Uganda Map; Placement on map is approximate
- Coordinates: 01°35′01″N 31°04′59″E
- Country: Uganda
- Region: Western Uganda
- Sub-region: Bunyoro
- District: Hoima District
- Elevation: 900 m (3,000 ft)
- Climate: Aw

Tonya is a settlement in Western Uganda.

== Location ==
Tonya is located in Hoima District, along the eastern shores of Lake Albert. It lies approximately 45 kilometres (28 mi), by road, northwest of Hoima, the location of the district headquarters and the largest city in the sub-region. Tonya lies approximately 17 kilometres (11 mi), by road, northeast of Kaiso, the nearest urban centre. The coordinates of Tonya are:1°35'01.0"N, 31°04'59.0"E (Latitude:1.583611; 31.083056).

== Overview ==
Tonya lies in the oil-rich Albertine Graben. Tonya is located close to the Waraga-1 Oil Well, the first free-flowing oil well in East Africa south of the Sudan, flow tested in 2008.

== See also ==
- Kaiso, Uganda
- Nzizi Power Station
- Uganda Oil Refinery
- Uganda-Kenya Crude Oil Pipeline
