= Kigorobya =

- Map of Uganda showing the location of Kigorobya
- Coordinates: 01°37′05″N 31°18′32″E
- Country: Uganda
- Region: Western Region of Uganda
- District: Hoima District
- Elevation: 1,101 m (3,612 ft)

Population (2018 Estimate)
  - Total: 5,420
- Time zone: UTC+3 (EAT)

Kigorobya, is a town in the Western Region of Uganda. It is an urban center in the Hoima District Administration. Kigorobya also refers to a sub-county in Uganda, where the town is located.

== Location ==
The town is located in Hoima District, in the Western Region of Uganda, approximately 25 kilometres (16 mi), north-west of Hoima, the location of the district headquarters. Kigorobya is about 62 kilometres (39 mi), by road, west of Masindi, the largest city in Bunyoro sub-region.

The town lies at an average elevation of 1,101 metres (3,612 ft), above sea level. The geographical coordinates of Kigorobya are 01°37'05.0"N, 31°18'32.0"E (Latitude:1.618056; Longitude:31.308889).

== Population ==
The population of Kigorobya Town is estimated at 5,420 people, as of September 2018.

== See also ==
- List of cities and towns in Uganda
