= Nzizi Thermal Power Station =

Power station in Uganda

- Nzizi Thermal Power Station
- Country: Uganda
- Location: Nzizi
- Coordinates: 01°31′16″N 30°58′05″E
- Status: Planned
- Commission date: To be determined
- Owners: Tullow Oil & Jacobsen Electro

Thermal power station
- Primary fuel: Natural gas
- Secondary fuel: Heavy fuel oil

Power generation
- Nameplate capacity: 100 MW (130,000 hp)

Nzizi Power Station is a planned 100 MW (130,000 hp) natural gas-fired thermal power plant in Uganda.

== Location ==
The power plant is planned to be constructed in Nzizi, near the Nzizi Natural Gas & Oil Field, in the Kaiso-Tonya Area in Hoima District in the Western Region of Uganda. Kaiso and Tonya are small settlements, about 15 kilometres (9.3 mi) apart, on the eastern shores of Lake Albert. This is approximately 61 kilometres (38 mi) by road, west of Hoima, the nearest large town and the location of the district headquarters. The approximate coordinates of the power station are 1°31'16.0"N, 30°58'05.0"E (Latitude:1.521104; Longitude:30.968047). The coordinates are approximate because the power station has not been built yet.

== Overview ==
The power station is a planned joint project by Tullow Oil Uganda Limited, who will supply the fuel, and Jacobsen Electricity Company (Uganda) Limited, a wholly owned subsidiary of Jacobsen Elektro AS, an independent Norwegian power production company, who will construct and operate the plant.

The plant will primarily use natural gas to heat water and produce steam that will turn the turbines to produce electricity. If need be, the plant will also be designed to use heavy fuel oil, a byproduct of petroleum distillation, as an alternative fuel. The Nzizi Natural Gas & Oil Field, from which the power station will draw its fuel, has confirmed natural gas reserves of at least 14,000,000 cubic metres (490,000,000 ft^{3}). The power generated will be evacuated along a 132 kilovolt transmission line to a substation in Hoima, where the power will be integrated into the national power grid. According to Uganda's government officials, construction is expected to commence in 2016 and last 10 months, with commissioning in 2017.

== Construction costs ==
The total cost for the power plant is estimated at US$170 million (UGX:436.9 billion). Of that, US$25.5 million (UGX:65.5 billion) representing 15 percent of the total, will be contributed by the Ugandan government.

== See also ==
- Uganda Oil Refinery
- Uganda National Oil Company
- List of power stations in Uganda
- Hoima–Kampala Petroleum Products Pipeline
