= Albertine Graben Refinery Consortium =

Refinery Consortium in Uganda

Coordinates: 01°32′24″N 31°08′14″E

- Type: Private
- Industry: Petroleum refining
- Founded: 2017
- Headquarters: Uganda,
- Products: Gasoline, Jet fuel, Kerosine, Diesel fuel, Heavy fuel oil, Liquefied petroleum gas

Albertine Graben Refinery Consortium (AGRC), is a consortium of 4 international companies which agreed in 2018 with the government of Uganda, to invest in, construct, operate and co-own the Uganda Oil Refinery on the Eastern shore of Lake Albert. It consists of General Electric of the United States, Yaatra Ventures LLC of the United States, Intracontinent Asset Holdings Limited of Mauritius and Saipem SPA of Italy.

== Overview ==
Ugandan government geologists estimate Uganda's oil reserves at 6.5 billion barrels, of which approximately 1.7 billion are considered recoverable. In 2016, the selected lead investor in the refinery project, RT Global Resources of Russia, pulled out of negotiations. Negotiations with the alternative investor, a consortium led by SK Engineering of South Korea also broke down.

In 2018, new bids for a lead investor in the refinery attracted over 40 applicants. The second round of selection, identified the Albertine Graben Refinery Consortium as the entity offering the best terms for construction of the Uganda Oil Refinery, estimated at US$4.27 billion.

== Composition ==
As of 2018 the Albertine Graben Refinery Consortium included the following 4 companies:

Composition
Rank	Name of Owner
1	General Electric of the United States
2	Yaatra Ventures LLC of the United States
3	Intracontinent Asset Holdings Limited of Mauritius
4	Saipem SPA of Italy

== Agreement ==
On 10 April 2018, the Consortium signed a definitive agreement with the government of Uganda, committing to design, develop, finance, construct, operate and maintain the planned 60,000-barrel-per-day Uganda Oil Refinery in Kabaale, Buseruka sub-county, Hoima District, on the Eastern shore of Lake Albert in the Western Region Uganda. The signing of this Project Framework Agreement, allows the consortium to begin the Front-End Engineering and Design (FEED), Project Capital and Investment Costs Estimation (PCE) and environmental impact assessment and social impact assessment. Uganda has ambitions to produce first oil by 2025.

== See also ==
- Petroleum Authority of Uganda
- Uganda National Oil Company
