= Aidan Heavey =

Irish businessman (born 1953)

- Born: Aidan Joseph Heavey; 14 March 1953 (age 73)
- Education: Clongowes Wood College
- Alma mater: University College Dublin
- Occupation: Businessman
- Years active: 1974–present
- Title: Chairman of Tullow Oil plc
- Term: 1985–present
- Successor: Incumbent
- Spouse: Lorraine Heavey
- Children: 3

Aidan Joseph Heavey (born 14 March 1953) is the founder of Tullow Oil, one of Europe's largest oil businesses.

== Early life ==
From Castlerea, County Roscommon and educated at Clongowes Wood College in County Kildare and at University College Dublin, Heavey trained with R. J. Kidney & Co. from 1974 to 1978 when he qualified as an accountant.

== Career ==
He left R. J. Kidney & Co. in 1979 to join Aer Lingus as a Financial Controller before joining Tullow Engineering in 1981: it was there that he founded Tullow Oil in 1985 building it through a series of acquisitions into a major international oil business.

Heavey's salary at Tullow Oil is £679,450 as of 2010 and his 2009 bonus was £859,274.

Heavey was under pressure to step down as CEO in January 2013 when the firm missed production targets at a project in Ghana. This was because of 'operational hiccups'. This sent the share price down and after the broker Investec rated the firm a 'sell'. Heavey also received criticism for managing too many projects at once. Heavey also ran into troubles in Uganda because the government demanded that the firm build a larger refinery than the one pre-agreed.

Heavey was also criticised in May 2013 after he was seen sporting a €53,000 Patek Philippe watch during a turbulent time for Tullow Oil.

In July 2013, Heavey was dragged in to a political row over whether a donation he made to the Conservatives before the general election in 2010 was connected to William Hague's intervention in Tullow Oil's Ugandan tax dispute. Heavey donated £10,000 to the party and this was believed to have been in return for Hague's cooperation in the dispute, during which he reportedly telephoned the Ugandan President Yoweri Museveni to ask for Tullow Oil to be let off a £200 million capital gains tax bill.

In April 2014, Heavey attracted criticism in the media and from investors at Tullow Oil after it emerged that his pay had risen from £2.6 million to £2.8 million in 2013, despite Tullow's share price decreasing by as much as 30 percent.
