= Lokichar =

- Location within Kenya
- Coordinates: 02.38°N 35.65°E
- Country: Kenya
- County: Turkana
- Time zone: UTC+3 (EAT)

Lokichar is a small town in Kenya's Turkana County.

Lokichar is situated in the heart of the dusty and arid Turkana basin (desert) in the Rift Valley, 550 km north-east of Nairobi. Until 2010 it was a forgotten backwater of Turkana cattle-based pastoralists with a pre-2010 population under 1,000. The principal activity was basket weaving and other native crafts to cater for the sparse traffic. The 2011 discovery of oil by Tullow Oil, talk of the Uganda/South Sudan oil pipeline to Lamu passing through, and the opening of the border to the new state of South Sudan has started to transform its prospects. The 2012 population for the area was 2,000 and rising. There is a small non-commercial airport.

== See also ==
- South Lokichar Basin
