= Uganda Oil Refinery =

Planned crude oil refinery in Kabaale village, Uganda

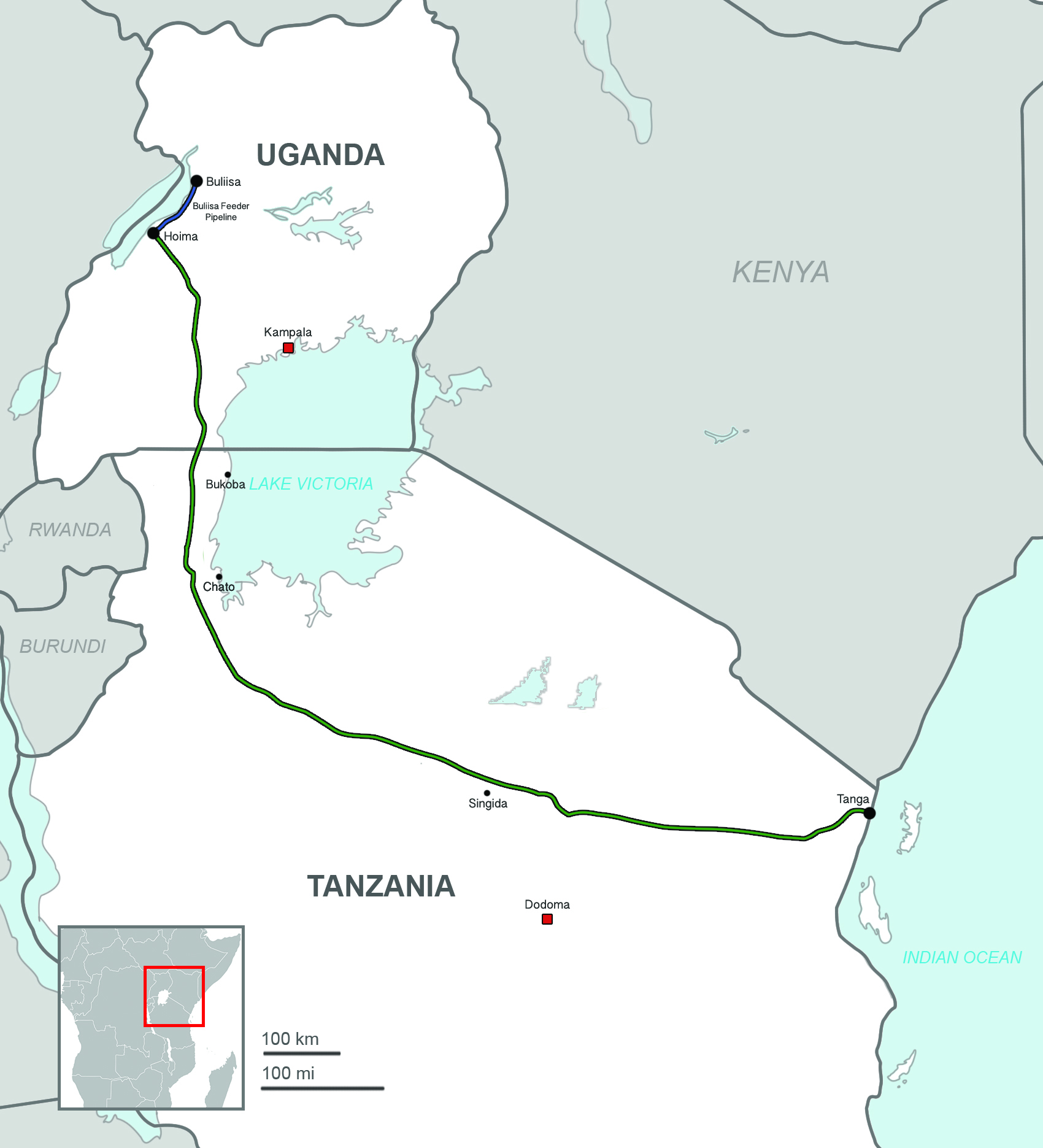
- Proposed route of 1,410km East African Oil Pipeline

- Location within Uganda
- Location: Kabaale Township, Hoima District, Uganda, Buseruka Subcounty Hoima District Western Uganda, Uganda; 01°30′00″N 31°04′48″E

Refinery details
- Opened: 2030 (Expected)
- Capacity: 60,000 barrels per day (9,500 m^{3}/d)

The Uganda Oil Refinery is a planned crude oil refinery in Kabaale village, on the Eastern shore of Lake Albert along the Hoima–Kaiso–Tonya Road, Buseruka Sub-county, Hoima District, Western Region, Uganda, near the border with the Democratic Republic of the Congo. It has been planned since 2010. Community opposition was repressed early on. After 5 years of negotiations the Albertine Graben Refinery Consortium (AGRC) formed in 2018 and agreed to design and build the refinery.

The refinery is planned to be fed by the East African Crude Oil Pipeline (EACOP) via a heated northern and a heated southern pipeline, for which the Nzizi Power Station, a 100 megawatt thermal power plant, using natural gas and heavy fuel oil as raw material will be built, together with a hospital and an international airport.

== Location ==
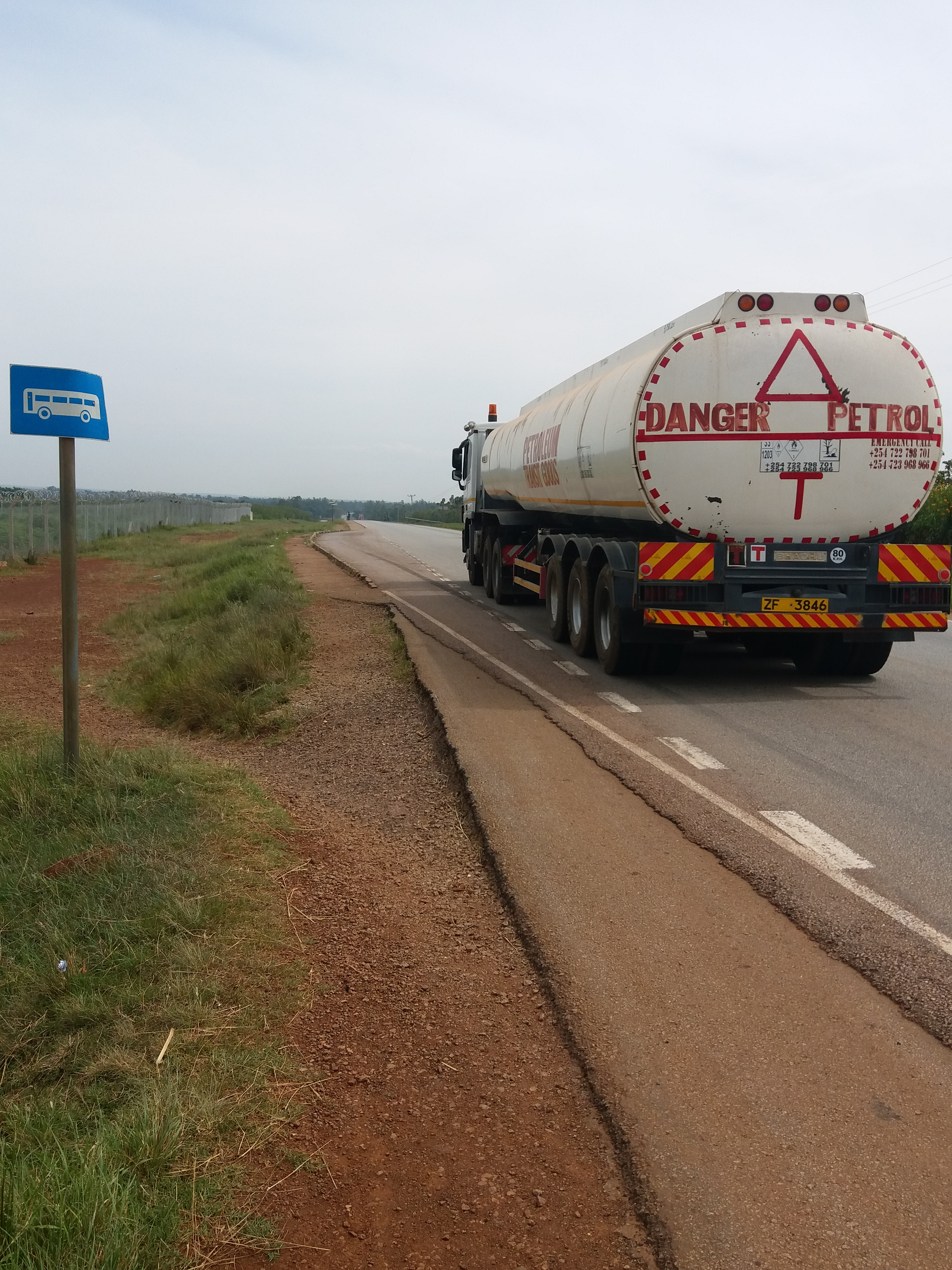
A truck transporting Petroleum oil

The refinery is planned to be built on a 29 square kilometres (11 mi^{2}) piece of land in Kabaale village, Buseruka Sub-county, Hoima District, Western Region, near the international border with the Democratic Republic of the Congo, on the eastern shore of Lake Albert. The refinery will be located 100 km away from a processing facility, which itself is 100 kilometres (62 mi) north-east of Kingfisher oil field, on the Buhuka Flats at the shores of Lake Albert, in the Kikuube District, connected by a 46 kilometres (29 mi) long feeder pipeline, the southern pipeline. The refinery will also be south of the Tilenga project, which will consist of 6 oil fields and 426 oil wells. The northern pipeline would be 96 kilometres (60 mi) long with a 16-inch diameter and carry oil from Jobi in Nwoya District, Kasemene, Kigogole and other oil fields in Buliisa District, to the refinery. Both pipelines will be electrically heated, since the waxy crude oil from Uganda's oilfields solidifies at room temperature. Thus the refinery will be close to Uganda's largest oil fields in the Kaiso-Tonya area, about 60 kilometres (37 mi), by road, west of Hoima, the location of the district headquarters, and the nearest large city. Kaiso is about 260 kilometres (162 mi), by road, north-west of Kampala, Uganda's capital and largest city.

== Overview ==
As of 2013, two intake pipelines and one distribution pipeline, with a total construction bill of over US$200 million, were planned to bring crude to the refinery and distribute the finished products to a new terminal in Buloba on the western outskirts of Kampala.

As of 2015 Uganda had proven crude oil reserves of 6.5 billion barrels, about 2.2 billion of which is recoverable. The International Monetary Fund was quoted in 2013 as saying that Ugandas oil reserves are the fourth-largest in sub-Saharan Africa, behind Nigeria, Angola, and South Sudan.

Since some of the largest oil fields are in the Kaiso-Tonya area in Hoima District, the area was selected for Uganda's only oil refinery. The strategy is to build a refinery that meets the petroleum products needs of Uganda and its regional neighbors, with any remaining to be exported.

In addition to the refinery, as of 2015 a new airport and a hospital was planned. The Hoima–Kaiso–Tonya Road, which connects Hoima to Kaiso and Tonya along the eastern shores of Lake Albert, passes through Kabaale Village where the refinery will be located. As of 2016 the Nzizi Power Station was planned, a 100 megawatt thermal power plant, using natural gas and heavy fuel oil as raw material.

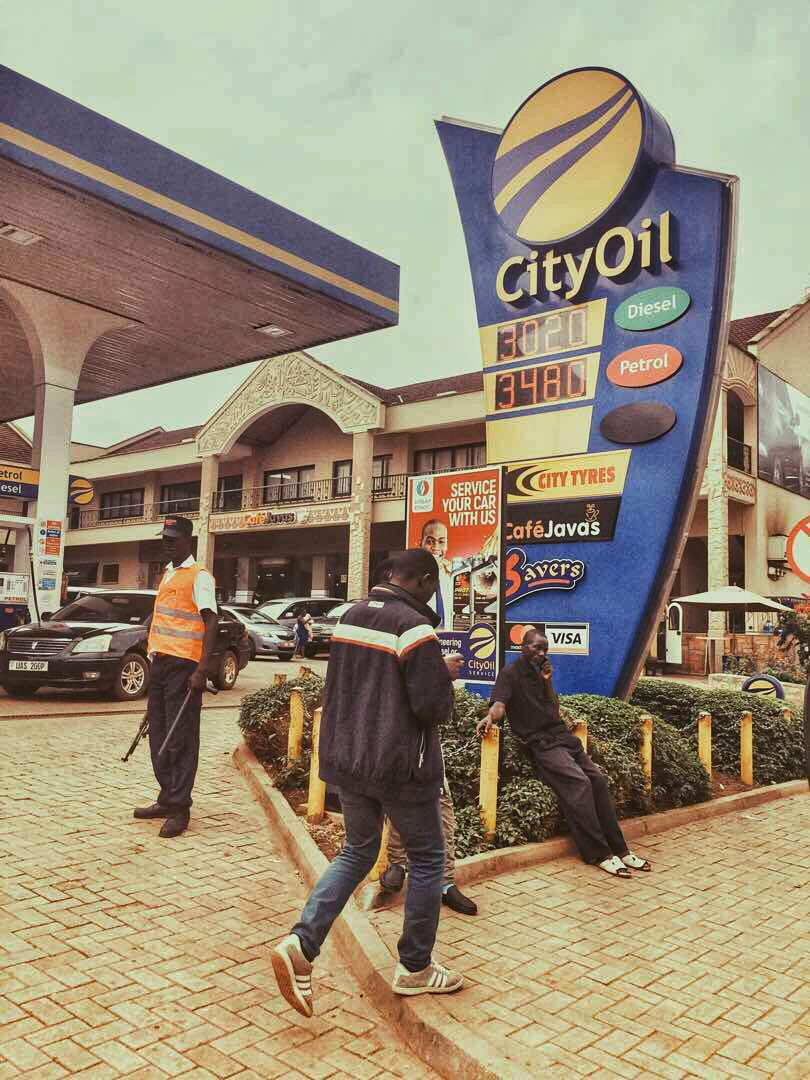
Oil supply point.

In 2015, the cost of the refinery was estimated to be US$4.3 billion, with 70 percent of that amount to be borrowed and the remaining 30 percent coming from shareholders. In July 2015, the government hired the Danish Ramboll Group A/S to conduct an "'early phase' detailed route and environmental study for an oil pipeline that will run from the Albertine Graben - Hoima to Buloba...."

== History ==
As early as 2010, community opposition rose against plans to build the Uganda Oil Refinery, which led to repression against environmental activists.

As of 2011, the government of Uganda had preferred a small production capacity to prolong the longevity of its new oil discoveries. This preference initially pitted it against the three major exploration companies in the country, which preferred rapid harvesting and export of the crude via pipeline to the Kenyan coast.

In March 2013, the government of Uganda engaged the US-based energy investment and consulting firm Taylor Dejongh to carry out an international search for a strategic investor in the refinery.

In October 2013, the government of Uganda invited interested parties to bid for the construction, operation, and 60 percent ownership of the refinery in a public-private partnership arrangement.

In January 2014, the Ugandan government shortlisted the following six consortia out of fifteen applicants for possible selection as strategic investor in the refinery: China Petroleum Pipeline Bureau ( People's Republic of China), Marubeni Corporation (Japan), Petrofac (United Arab Emirates), RT Global Resources (Russia), SK Energy (South Korea), and Vitol (the Netherlands).

In June 2014, media reports indicated that four of the six companies had submitted detailed proposals for the construction of the refinery. At that time, the firms still left in the bidding were China Petroleum Pipeline Bureau, Marubeni Corporation, RT Global Resources, and SK Energy.

In June 2014, it was reported that consortia led by RT Global Resources and SK Energy had emerged as the two best contenders. They were requested to make a last and final proposal so that the winner could be selected by the end of August 2014.

In February 2015, media reports indicated that the consortium led by RT Global Resources (also including Telconet Capital Limited Partnership, VTB Capital, JSC Tatneft, and the GS Engineering and Construction Corporation) had won the bid to build the refinery.

According to a July 2016 report, talks between the government of Uganda and RT Global Resources which had started in February 2015 broke down, and the consortium pulled out. Uganda then began negotiations with the reserve bidder, the consortium led by SK Engineering & Construction of South Korea. The new consortium members included SK Engineering and Construction, the KBD Global Investment Partnership Private Equity Fund, the China State Construction Engineering Corporation, Haldor Topsøe A/S, and Maestro Oil and Gas.

In late 2016, negotiations with the consortium led by SK Engineering & Construction also broke down. Negotiations were then started with a new consortium led by Guangzhou Dongsong Energy Group, a Chinese company. Others in that consortium included (a) China Petroleum Engineering & Construction Corporation (CPECC) (b) China Africa Fund for Industrial Cooperation (CAFIC) (c) Guangzhou Silk Road (d) East China Design and Engineering Institute (e) Exim Bank of China and (f) Industrial and Commercial Bank of China (ICBC). Those talks collapsed in June 2017 when CPECC, the main contractor in the consortium, pulled out of the talks.

In August 2017, a new consortium led by General Electric of the United States and Jk Minerals Africa of South Africa agreed to build the US$4 Billion refinery and to own 50 and 10 percent respectively, while the government of Uganda and other investors would take up the remaining 40 percent. Other members in this new consortium were (i) Yaatra Ventures LLC, (ii) Intracontinent Asset Holdings and (iii) Saipem SpA of Italy. These firms were competitors during the initial bidding, but they came together and formed a special purpose vehicle, the Albertine Graben Refinery Consortium (AGRC), to design, procure the necessary supplies and build the refinery.

== Ownership ==
In 2015, General Electric was expected to take up 50 percent and Jk Minerals Africa 10 percent. The government of Uganda proposed that the remaining 40 percent be divided among itself, Burundi, Kenya, Rwanda, and Tanzania in equal shares, except that Uganda would assume whatever ownership interests are not subscribed by the other countries. Kenya agreed to purchase a 2.5 percent interest in the refinery for an estimated KES:5.6 billion. As of 2016, it had not decided whether to increase that interest to the maximum of 8 percent, saying that it needed to further evaluate the project's commercial value in light of the government's budgetary constraints.

In 2014 Burundi and Rwanda submitted letters of interest to Uganda. Burundi did not decide the extent of its ownership interest, waiting on the feasibility study of the refinery and a detailed statement of anticipated costs.

In 2016, Tanzania committed to pay US$150.4 million for 8 percent ownership in the refinery.

In October 2016, it was reported that TotalEnergies of France had committed to acquiring 10 percent shareholding in the refinery.

As of April 2018 the tentative ownership table was as follows:

Uganda Oil Refinery Stock Ownership (Tentative)
Rank	Name of Owner	Percentage Ownership
1	General Electric of the United States	50.0
2	Uganda Refinery Holding Company	19.5
3	JK Minerals Africa	10.0
4	TotalEnergies of France	10.0
5	Tanzania Petroleum Development Corporation	8.0
6	National Oil Corporation of Kenya	2.5
7	Other Investors	
	Total	100.00

As of 30 March 2025, following the signing of the refinery implementation agreement on 29 March 2025, at State House Entebbe, the ownership table was as follows:

Uganda Oil Refinery Stock Ownership (Tentative)
Rank	Name of Owner	Percentage Ownership
1	Alpha MBM Investments LLC of the United Arab Emirates	60.0
2	Uganda Refinery Holding Company	40.0
	Total	100.00

== Agreement ==
In April 2018, the Albertine Graben Refinery Consortium signed a definitive agreement with the government of Uganda, committing to design, develop, finance, construct, operate and maintain the planned 60,000-barrel-per-day Uganda Oil Refinery in Hoima District, in the Western Region of Uganda The signing of this Project Framework Agreement, allows for the commencement of the Front End Engineering and Design, Project Capital and Investment Costs Estimation (PCE) and environmental impact assessment and social impact assessments.

In August 2018, the Albertine Graben Refinery Consortium (AGRC), selected Saipem SpA of Italy and a member of AGRC to begin with the FEED study, at a contract price of US$68 million. The study is expected to last 17 months, to be followed by the engineering, procurement, and construction phase.

On 30 June 2023, the deadline for AGRC to reach financial close expired without funding acquisition. The government of Uganda, which had extended the deadline twice before, declined to do it a third time. According to media reports, Uganda is considering working with Sonatrach Petroleum Corporation of Algeria and with the member states of the East African Community in order to raise the necessary funding and the technical expertise to build the refinery and bring it online by 2027.

== Developments ==
In January 2024, it was disclosed that the government of Uganda had entered into negotiations with Alpha MBM Investments LLC, based in Dubai, whose shareholders include members of the Dubai Royal Family, to explore the possibility of the Middle Eastern investors funding the refinery. Negotiations are expected to conclude during Q2 of 2024.

In November 2024, online media quoting Ruth Nankabirwa, Uganda's oil minister, reported that the Ugandan government and their Dubai-based partners Alpha MBM Investments, have decided to "wholly finance the $4-billion oil refinery project through equity". Alpha MBM Investments have assured that they have adequate funds to fund their equity participation in the project.

The refinery project also involves the construction of a multi-products pipeline from Kabaale in Hoima District to Namwabula in Mpigi District measuring 211 kilometres (131 mi), a refined product storage terminal in Namwabula and a raw water intake pipe from Lake Albert to the refinery in Kabaale.

In addition to premium motor spirit, the refinery is expected to produce jet fuel, diesel fuel, kerosine, liquefied petroleum gas (LPG) and other products of crude oil distillation. An estimated total of 100,000 kilograms (220,462 lb) of LPG are expected to be generated at the refinery (20 percent from Kingfisher) and (80 percent from Tilenga), on an annual basis.

On 29 March 2025, the Ugandan government and the UAE-based investment firm Alpha MBM Investments LLC signed a refinery implementation agreement where the GOU takes 40 percent shareholding and Alpha MBM takes 60 percent ownership. Construction work is expected to start later in 2025 and last an expected three years.

In October 2025, Kenyan online media reported that the refinery was expected online no later that the first quarter of 2030. The adjacent planned Kabalega Petrochemical Industrial Park is expected to produce "petrochemicals, kerosene, fertilizers and gas processing" and other products. A 200 MW high voltage transmission line will supply the refinery directly.

== See also ==
- Hoima–Kampala Petroleum Products Pipeline
- Petroleum Authority of Uganda
- Kenya–Uganda–Rwanda Petroleum Products Pipeline
- Uganda National Oil Company
- Uganda–Kenya Crude Oil Pipeline
