= Poverty in Uganda =

Extreme poverty is defined as living on less than US$2.50 purchasing power parity. Uganda has made significant progress in eradicating poverty and achieved the first millennium development goal of halving the number of people in extreme poverty. Uganda was listed as the 9th most successful country in Africa as regards poverty eradication. The percentage of Ugandans living in absolute poverty has been on a substantial decline, and the finance ministry in the country projected that the extreme poverty level will be reduced to 10% in the future. This success has been attributed to the deliberate efforts to combat poverty in the country by numerous national strategies that are explained below.

== Education ==
The right to quality education, food, health, housing and work (adequate income) are economic and social rights that are used to measure the quality of life of a particular nation. Uganda scores 54.7% in its quality of life for 2017. This score shows how well Uganda is doing to ensure these rights and not the numbers or percentages of people.

Lack of education in sub-Saharan Africa is a major determinant of extreme poverty. Uganda has made some progress in fighting illiteracy with current literacy levels at 76%. Education is funded both by private means and by the government. With free primary and secondary education through the universal primary and secondary education over 90% of the population attains a primary education, however, the quality of education being offered is low according to a survey done by the world bank in the country in 2013

On the right to education, Uganda is 65.3% of what should be possible at its level of income measured against its income-adjusted benchmark The Rights Tracker by the Human Rights Measurement Initiative produces metrics for the full range of human rights listed in the International Bill of Human Rights. For Uganda, the indicators used include the net primary and secondary schools enrolment rates provided by UNESCO.

== Progress ==
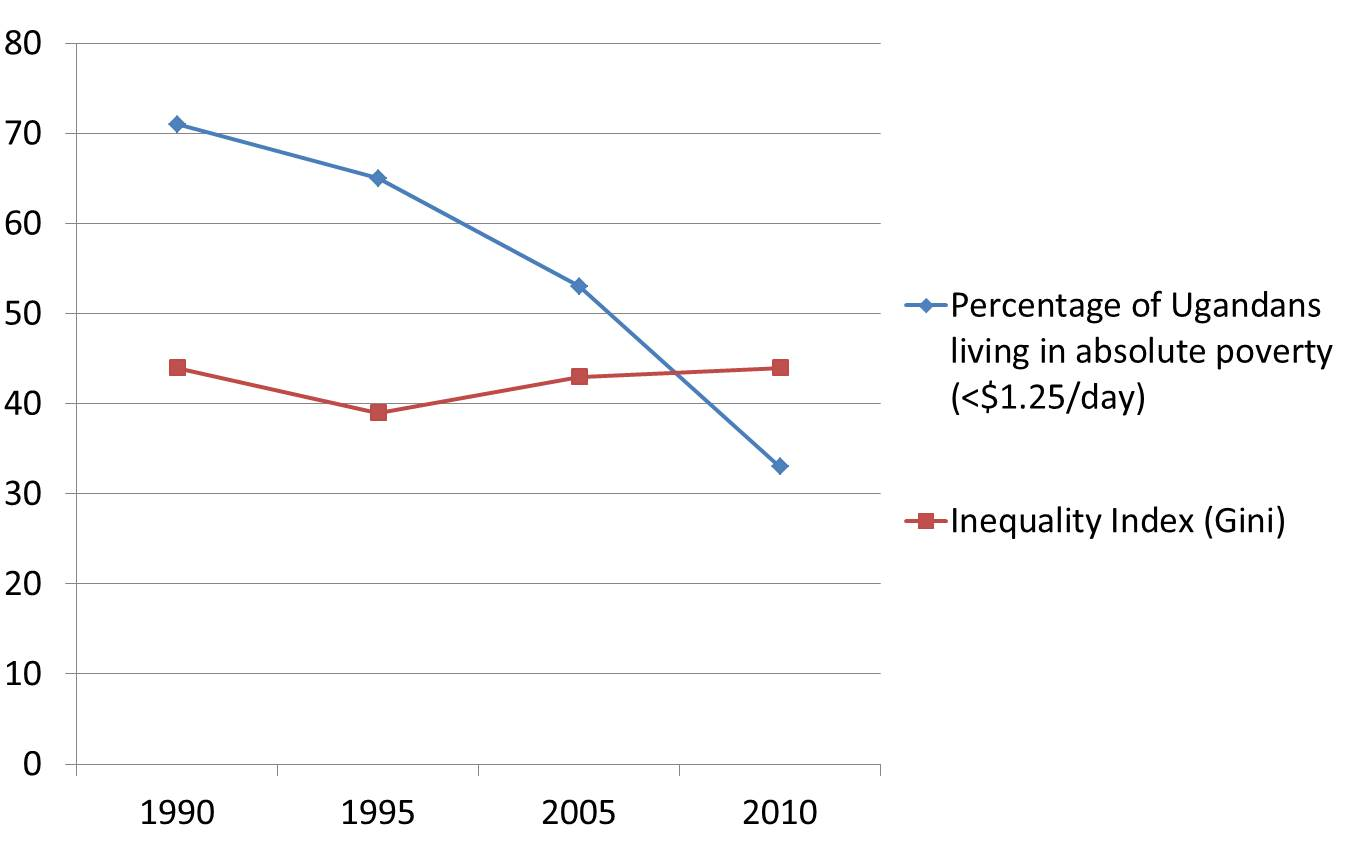
Trends in reduction of extreme poverty and income inequality in Uganda from 1990 to 2015

Uganda has made progress towards poverty elimination having successfully achieved the millennium development goal target of halving the number of people in extreme poverty way ahead of the 2015 deadline. Today, an estimated 25% still live in extreme poverty but Uganda is on course to achieve its national target of reducing this number to 10% by 2017 Despite this progress, significant inequality still exists. Progress in reducing poverty has been very slow in the Northern and Eastern parts of Uganda and a 2016 poverty assessment report by World Bank indicates that the poverty rate in these two regions actually increased from 68% to 84% between the years 2006 and 2013. Whereas most of the progress in poverty reduction in Uganda has been realized from the monetary dimension, there are still huge challenges especially as regards the non-monetary dimensions of poverty such as access to safe water, clean energy, quality education and health care. A civil society parallel report on the progress made by the country highlights the possibility of the above official figures to have been exaggerated

The world's reduction of extreme poverty from 47% of the entire population in 1990 to 14% of the entire population has shown the possibility of eradicating extreme poverty from the world in the next generation. With a 28% reduction, Sub-Saharan African region showed the least improvement in poverty eradication in the period from 1990 to 2015 compared to the other regions. Uganda has deferred from the general sub-Saharan trend by significantly reducing the proportion of the extremely poor to 25%. The Human Rights Measurement Initiative gives Uganda a 40% score with regards to absolute poverty.

== Poverty Eradication Action Plan (PEAP) ==
The push for a poverty eradication plan emerged from rural political discontent highlighted during the 1996 elections, as communities stressed that peace and economic growth had not translated into improved livelihoods. The PEAP was introduced in 1997 and served as Uganda’s overarching national development framework and underwent its second revision in the mid 2000s. It aimed to reduce absolute poverty to below 10% by 2017 and was endorsed by the World Bank and the International Monetary Fund as Uganda’s Poverty Reduction Strategy Paper. This recognition made Uganda the first country to benefit from debt relief under the Heavily Indebted Poor Countries initiative, placing poverty reduction policy within the PEAP framework.

The PEAP aimed to support Uganda’s transition toward middle income status by promoting competitive, private sector led industrialisation rather than protectionist policies. The strategy emphasised value addition through the processing of agricultural products, linking industrial growth closely to agricultural development and rising rural incomes, where most poverty was concentrated. Manufacturing growth was expected to depend on agriculture both as a source of raw materials for exports and as a driver of rural incomes that sustain domestic demand. To achieve this, the plan prioritised strengthening agriculture through infrastructure, strengthen governance by addressing corruption, enhance education, strengthen the financial sector, and put in place regulations designed to ensure fair competition.

== National development Plan 1 (NDP 1) ==
The NDP 1 was launched in 2010/11 and replaced the PEAP as Uganda’s framework for poverty eradication. The NDP 1 focused on primary growth sectors that provide direct products and services and these include Agriculture, tourism, oil and gas, manufacturing, forestry, mining and ICT. Secondly, it focused on complementary sector which provides infrastructural support to the products;these include transport, energy and water, trade and financial services

== National development plan II (NDP II) ==
In June 2015, the government of Uganda and United Nations Developmental Assistance launched the NDP II to guide Uganda's path to poverty eradication. The main goal of the NDP II is to propel Uganda to the middle-income status with a GDP per capita of US$1,003.

=== NDPII aims ===
To strengthen the country's competitiveness for sustainable wealth creation, employment and inclusive growth through:

- Increasing sustainable production, productivity and value addition in key growth opportunities
- Increasing the stock and quality of strategic infrastructure to accelerate the country's competitiveness
- Enhancing human capital development
- Strengthening mechanisms for quality, effective and efficient service delivery.

=== Goals of NDP II by 2020 ===
- To increase income from US$788 to US$1,033
- To reduce the poverty rate from 19.7% to 14.2%
- To reduce the number of young people not in education, employment or training by at least 50%
- To increase manufactured exports as a percentage of total exports from 5.8% to 19%
- To increase percentage of population with access to electricity from 14% to 30%
- To increase access to safe water from 65% to 79% in rural and from 77% to 100% in urban areas.
- To increasing the quantity of total national paved road network(km) from 3,795 to 5,000
- To reduce the infant mortality rate per 1,000 from 54 to 44 and maternal mortality per 100,000 from 438 to 220,000
- To reduce fertility to 4.5 children per woman
- To increase primary to secondary transition rate from 73% to 80% and net secondary completion rate from 36% to 50%

==== Main economic focus ====
Agriculture is Uganda's main economic activity. Twelve key agricultural products have been earmarked for investment: cotton, coffee, tea, maize, rice, cassava, beans, fish, beef, milk, citrus and bananas. On food security, Uganda scores a rate of 78.2 compared to what is possible at its rate of income.

Uganda is commonly referred to as the pearl of Africa because of its natural beauty. This often attracts tourists from all over the world. Improvement, diversification and aggressive marketing of the tourism sector has thence been highlighted in the second national development plan. The country will focus on the exploitation of iron ore, limestone ad marble, copper, cobalt, phosphates, dimension stones and uranium. In addition, the country's newly discovered 6.5 billion barrels of oil are to be exploited.

Right to Work and to earn an adequate income in Uganda

According to international law, everyone is entitled to the opportunity to gain a living by work that is freely chosen and "the right to the enjoyment of just and favourable conditions of work". This includes "equal pay for equal work, the chance to earn a decent living for [ourselves] and [our] families, just and safe working conditions, and a reasonable limitation of working hours" (ICESCR, Articles 6 and 7). The Rights Tracker scores Uganda at 39.1%. This right is measured using indicators such as the number of people above the relative poverty line, the number of people, the number of people above absolute poverty and the number of unemployed people.

== The poor and the rich ==
The distribution of the poor and the rich in Uganda and where the poor are most found in the country.

Statistics
1	Karamoja region	74%
2	West Nile region	42%
3	Lango and Acholi	35%
4	Eastern region	24.7%
5	Busoga	24.3%
6	Bunyoro, Tooro and Rwenzori	9.8%
7	Ankole and Kigezi	7.6%
8	Buganda region	
	Central Two	7.3%
	Central One	3.7%
9	Kampala	0.7%

=== Distribution of the middle class ===
The Ugandan Middle class is distributed as below:

Statistics
1	Buganda Region	
	Kampala	89%
	Central One	64%
	Central Two	46%
2	Ankole And Kigezi	50%
3	Bunyoro, Tooro and Rwenzori	45%
4	Busoga Region	25%
5	Lango and Acholi	23%
6	Eastern Region	18%
7	West Nile region	17%
8	Karamoja region	9%

== Challenges ==
Inequality between the rich and poor at various levels of society remains a challenge, as is shown by the high inequality index as measured by the Gini, currently over 40%. Challenges highlighted by the first national development plan continue to exist. These include slow growth in agricultural and industrial sector, low productivity growth in agriculture, poor mediation of capital by capital markets and the primary dominance of primary over industrial products.

== See also ==
- Economy of Uganda
- Corruption in Uganda
- List of countries by percentage of population living in poverty
- Poverty in Africa
