= South Lokichar Basin =

The South Lokichar Basin is a Cenozoic sedimentary basin in Kenya. It is part of the East African Rift system, although it is no longer active. Since 2012 it has been the location of a series of oil discoveries by Tullow Oil and its partners.

== Geometry ==
The South Lokichar Basin is a north–south trending half-graben with the main bounding fault on its western margin. It is approximately 80 km long, 25 km wide and has a maximum depth of over 7 km. The main fault, known as the Lokichar Fault, is relatively low angle and planar in section, although the dip varies considerably along strike from 12° to 60°.

== Fill ==
The basin is filled by a sequence of Oligocene (possibly as old as Eocene) to Miocene sedimentary rocks. There is one major interval of volcanic rocks near the top of the sequence called the Auwerwer basalts, dated using K–Ar dating as middle to late Miocene in age (12.5–10.7 Ma).

== Hydrocarbon exploration ==
Exploration in the basin began with the Loperot-1 well drilled by Royal Dutch Shell in 1992. This found some oil in thin sands, but proved the presence of a good quality and mature source rock and good quality reservoir sands. This phase of exploration ended as the company assessed the results as non-commercial. In 2008 Africa Oil Corp acquired a PSA for license 10BB over the basin. In 2010 they farmed out part of their interest to Tullow, who became the operator. In 2012 drilling began with Ngamia-1, which was a major discovery. Subsequently, another eight discoveries have been made, all, like Ngamia, close to the basin bounding fault. There are now sufficient discovered resources for a commercial development. The proposed export route for the oil is the Kenya Crude Oil Pipeline.
