= Kabalega International Airport =

Airport under construction in Uganda

- IATA: none; ICAO: none

Summary
- Airport type: Public, civilian
- Owner: Civil Aviation Authority of Uganda
- Serves: Hoima, Uganda
- Location: Hoima District
- Elevation AMSL: 3,510 ft (1,070 m)
- Coordinates: 01°25′39″N 31°04′40″E

Map
- Location of Kabalega International Airport in Buseruka sub-county, Hoima District, Uganda; Placement on map is approximate

Runways
Direction	Length		Surface
Direction	ft	m	Surface
17/35	11,483	3,500	Asphalt

Kabalega International Airport (IATA: n/a, ICAO: n/a), also Hoima International Airport, is an airport under construction in Hoima District, Uganda. It is part of the infrastructure under construction as Uganda prepares to develop its nascent petroleum industry. When completed, it would be Uganda's second international airport, besides Entebbe International Airport. The new airport is expected to facilitate mobilization of equipment for construction of the Uganda Oil Refinery and assist in the development of agriculture and tourism in Uganda's Western Region.

== Location ==
Kabalega Airport is located in Kabaale Parish, Buseruka sub-county, Hoima District in the Western Region of Uganda, near the Kaiso-Tonya oil fields and the Uganda Oil Refinery. The air distance between the general area where the airport is being built and Entebbe International Airport, Uganda's largest civilian and military airport, is about 200 kilometres (124 mi). Kabalega International Airport sits on 29 square kilometres (11 sq mi). The location of Hoima International Airport is approximately 51 kilometres (32 mi), by road, to the west of the city of Hoima. The elevation of Kabaale Village is 1,070 metres (3,510 ft), above mean sea level.

== Overview ==
This airport is a large international airport capable of handling large passenger and cargo aircraft, sufficient to carry the equipment and staff to develop the Uganda Oil Refinery and the oilfields. The airport's main runway was expected to measure 3,100 metres (10,171 ft) in length. Later, the length of the runway was increased to 3,500 metres (11,483 ft).

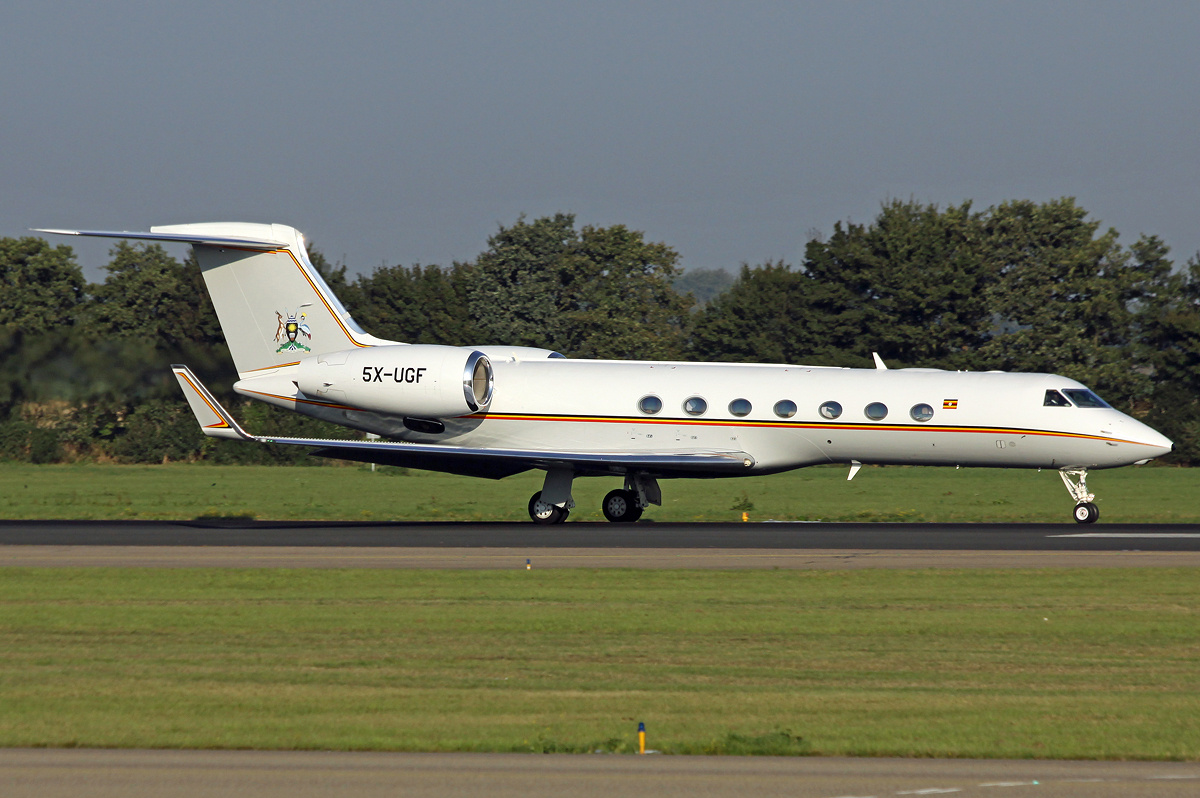
Uganda Government's Gulfstream G550 (Gulfstream V-SP)

As of February 2016, feasibility studies and the impact assessment evaluation were ongoing. Construction was expected to begin in 2017, led by a consortium made up of Colas Limited of the United Kingdom and SBI, a Ugandan construction company.

In January 2018, the UK lenders were identified as Standard Chartered Bank with guarantees from the United Kingdom Export Finance, with the two expected to lend €307 million.

== Construction ==
In February 2018, the government of Uganda selected Shikun & Binui, a construction firm based in Israel to construct this airport, at a cost of US$309 million. The construction which will be undertaken by Solel Boneh International Holdings (SBI), the international arm of Shikun & Binui, is expected to last three years. The scope of work includes (a) paving 3.5 kilometres (11,000 ft) of runways (b) carrying out of earthwork and installing drainage infrastructure (c) pouring of cement and asphalt (d) building of electro-mechanical, communications and navigation systems and (e) erection of an air traffic control tower, a cargo terminal, additional residencies and service structures.

SBC Uganda Limited, a joint venture company between Colas Limited of the United Kingdom and SBI International Holdings of Uganda, started construction of the airport in January 2018. The first phase of construction, including the runway and cargo-handling facilities, was expected to be ready in 2020. This phase is primarily to support construction of the oil refinery. The second phase of construction, focused on the facilitation of passengers and boosting tourism and business, was expected to conclude in 2022. The project is expected to create about 1,000 jobs, 30 percent of which are reserved for the local community and the remaining 70 percent reserved for other Ugandans, with a small number taken up by expatriates. Later, the completion of the first phase was pushed back to 2021. As of April 2019, work completed was estimated at 21 percent. In October 2019, completed work had progressed to 31 percent.

In December 2019, it was estimated that 34 percent of the work had been completed. At that time, a total of over 925 workers were employed on the project. Completion was estimated to be in February 2023. In August 2020, completion was estimated at 45 percent. At that time, a total of 830 workers were on the job, with 30 percent recruited from Hoima District. Twenty percent of the workers are female and 98 percent are Ugandan.

As of June 2021, according to the Petroleum Authority of Uganda, as reported by the Daily Monitor, completion had progressed to an estimated 55 percent, with the 3.5 kilometres (11,000 ft) runway nearly complete. Commercial commissioning was still planned for February 2023. In August 2021, the airport runway was 95 percent complete. At that time overall work on the airport was estimated at 66 percent complete. Commercial commissioning was anticipated no later than June 2023.

In March 2022, construction progress was estimated at 77 percent complete. The airport's jet fuel depot is expected to receive supplies by road from Kenya and later switch to direct supplies from the Uganda Oil Refinery, when that infrastructure is established.

As of May 2022, the runway was reported at 95 percent complete and the cargo building, passenger terminal, power substation house, ground lighting system, the firefighting house and related facilities were about 79 percent complete.

In October 2022, the EPC contactor, SBC Uganda Limited asked for 10 more months and more money to complete the first phase of construction. At that time, approximately 85 percent of the work was complete and about 80 percent of the budget had been spent. Reasons given for the requested changes included delays attributed to the COVID-19 epidemic, increase of the prices of cement, diesel fuel and gasoline, as a result of the Russo-Ukrainian War. The area was also inundated with heavy rains, further slowing down the progress of construction. A new completion date was reported as December 2023.

In December 2023, The Independent reported that a new completion date had been set as February 2024, to allow completion of the control tower, power substation and other related essential infrastructure. In April 2024, Ugandan online media reported that commercial commissioning was scheduled for August 2025.

In November 2024, with 95 percent works of the first phase completed, Fred Byamukama, the Uganda state minister for transport reiterated that opening of the airport was scheduled for 13 August 2025. As of January 2026, the construction of the airport was complete and was expected to be handed over to the government in March 2026. In August 2026, The Independent (Uganda) reported that the new handover date, from the contractor to the owner is scheduled in October 2026.

== Official name ==
In April 2023, Yoweri Museveni directed that the name of this airport becomes "Kabalega International Airport", in remembrance of Omukama Kabalega of Bunyoro (18 June 1853 – 6 April 1923), who reigned in the late 19th century.

== See also ==
- Hoima
- Civil Aviation Authority of Uganda
- List of airports in Uganda
