= Tullow Oil =

Multinational oil and gas exploration company

Tullow Oil plc
- Type: Public limited company
- Traded as: LSE: TLW
- ISIN: GB0001500809
- Industry: Oil and gas exploration
- Founded: 1985 in Tullow, Ireland
- Headquarters: London, United Kingdom
- Key people: Roald Goethe (Chair); Ian Perks, (CEO)
- Products: Oil and gas
- Revenue: ▼$1,634.1 million (2023)
- Operating income: ▼$295.9 million (2023)
- Net income: ▼$(109.6) million (2023)
- Website: www.tullowoil.com

Tullow Oil plc is a multinational oil and gas exploration company founded in Tullow, Ireland, with its headquarters in London, United Kingdom. The company is listed on the London Stock Exchange.

== History ==
=== Formation and development ===
The company was founded by Aidan Heavey in 1985, in Tullow, Ireland, as a gas exploration business operating in Senegal. Tullow listed its shares on the London Stock Exchange and Irish Stock Exchange in 1986 and the FTSE 100 index in September 2007.

In 2000, Tullow acquired £201 million worth of gas fields and infrastructure in the North Sea from BP. At the same time, Tullow re-registered in the UK. In May 2004, Tullow completed the Energy Africa acquisition for $570 million.

In 2006, the company began drilling its first well in Uganda and began exploiting the Lake Albert region. In 2007, Tullow drilled two deepwater wells offshore Ghana, discovering the massive Jubilee Oil Field.

In February 2010, the company initiated a "tax planning" exercise that was criticised by Heritage's counsel during the Heritage/Tullow court case in 2013, as an attempt to reduce the amount of tax the firm was liable to pay in Uganda. Richard Inch, Head of Tax at Tullow, firmly rejected the criticism while giving evidence in this case. In November 2010, the Jubilee field was brought on to production, in record time, some 40 months after its discovery. A new major discovery was also made at the Enyenra (Owo) and Tweneboa fields in Ghana during the year.

In 2011, the company bought into 25 Dutch, North Sea Gas fields and in March 2012, a new oil reserve was discovered in Kenya. In 2012, the company encountered non-commercial reservoirs at its Teak-4A well off Ghana, leading to the well having to be plugged and abandoned. Tullow completed the purchase of Heritage Oil's licences in the Lake Albert area in 2010, for $1.45bn, and on 21 February 2012, completed a farm down of two-thirds of its interests to Total and CNOOC for $2.9 billion US. But Tullow and its partners have yet to reach agreement with the Government of Uganda over a plan to develop Lake Albert including a proposed refinery and export-pipeline.

=== Bribery allegations ===
In October 2011, the Attorney General of Uganda initiated Parliamentary investigations into bribery allegations levelled at Tullow Oil and three cabinet ministers, named as Prime Minister Amama Mbabazi, Foreign Affairs Minister Sam Kutesa and his internal affairs counterpart, Hilary Onek. Another MP, Gerald Karuhanga, acted as the whistleblower when he submitted documents on the incident in Parliament during the October 2011 Special Oil Debate. On hearing the allegations, MPs also called for the accused to resign. On 11 April 2012, a Tullow Oil delegation appeared in front of an Ad Hoc committee of the Ugandan Parliament which was investigating these claims. A submission and supporting documents were handed over to the Committee – proving unequivocally that the allegations made against Tullow were false and based on forged documents. The submission to the Ad Hoc Committee can be downloaded from Tullow's website. After the investigation was announced, a lawyer, Severino Twinobusingye, sued the Attorney General in an attempt to block investigations into the bribery allegations, as well as calls for those accused to resign.

Twinobusingye also wanted the court to order for him to be paid for the costs incurred in the case. In March 2012, judges awarded Twinobusingye two-thirds of the total costs and decreed that the accused should not have to step down. In July 2012, the Constitutional Court rejected the Parliamentary Commission's intended appeal to the Supreme Court challenging the January 2012 ruling that blocked it from being party to the oil sector probe case. In February 2013, the court ordered the government to pay 12.9 billion shillings in costs to Twinobusingye in a move that was described as "very unprecedented in the country's history".

In 2012, there were some production delays at the Jubilee field. The firm and its leadership were criticised in January 2013 after a decrease in its share price. This was reportedly because the company had failed to reach production targets at a project in Ghana because of "operational hiccups". This prompted the broker Investec to rate the company a "sell" and decrease its target price. Also causing problems were the oil fields known as the TEN that Tullow discovered off the coast of Ghana. The fields were a significant find but the projected development cost of the fields was estimated to exceed $5 billion, which is too much for a firm of Tullow's size.

During the same period, Tullow Oil diversified its corporate structure by establishing Tullow Oil Finance Limited, a finance subsidiary of the parent company, which was incorporated on 15 June 2012.

=== Tax dispute ===
In December 2012, reports surfaced in the press that Tullow Oil was subject to arbitration with the government of Uganda at the International Centre for Settlement of Investment Disputes in the United States. The dispute arose after value added tax was imposed on goods and services that Tullow purchased for its oil exploration work in the country. The original case was filed in October 2012 at the International Centre for Settlement of Investment Disputes (ICSID) and due to the case being under seal, the intricacies are not open to the public. Information on the ICSID website reveals that the basis of the court case relates to "petroleum exploration, development and production agreement". Tullow Oil was represented by Kampala Associated Advocates. In light of this legal representation, Peter Kabatsi, Uganda's former solicitor general and partner at Kampala Associated Advocates, denied that he negotiated agreements with oil firms during his tenure as solicitor general, quashing claims of conflict of interest. The founder of Kampala Associated Advocates is Elly Kurahanga, the President of Tullow Uganda.

Government sources said that the real cause for concern for Uganda was the manner in which it lost millions of dollars over the last decade – money that could have stayed in the country. A report by the organization Global Financial Integrity (GFI) revealed that illicit financial flows from Uganda between 2001 and 2012 amounted to $680 million; in Tullow's case however, the firm argues that it is challenging tax demands that non-governmental organizations like GFI and the Tax Justice Network say should go towards government investment in healthcare, education and infrastructure.

=== Heritage Oil's Ugandan assets ===
In 2010, Tullow paid Heritage Oil $1.45 billion for its 50 percent share in two huge Ugandan oil fields - Blocks 1 and 3A. The Ugandan government initially demanded $405 million from Heritage in capital gains tax, and, with Heritage's agreement, Tullow paid the Ugandan Revenue Authority (URA) $121.5 million. This was a third of the original tax demand, as Ugandan tax rules required a one-third payment before Heritage could challenge the demand. Tullow placed the remaining $283.5 million into an escrow account, pending the outcome of the challenge, which left a reduced $1.045 billion payment that went directly to Heritage in exchange for the assets. However, in 2011, Tullow complied with another URA demand for a further $313.5 million payment, which was the balance of the original tax demand, plus an extra $30 million which the URA had added to the bill.

Tullow signed a Sale and Purchase Agreement with TOTAL and CNOOC on 30 March 2011. The second payment to the URA was made on 7 April 2011. The farm down to TOTAL and CNOOC was completed over 10 months later on 21 February 2012. The Total-CNOOC transaction netted Tullow $2.9 billion in a farm-down arrangement sanctioned by the government. Heritage claims that Tullow was motivated to pay the $313.5 million by the desire to help the deal go through.

In March 2013, court proceedings at London's High Court commenced after Tullow Oil sued Heritage Oil in a claim that it was forced to pay Heritage's $313 million tax bill after Tullow acquired Heritage's Ugandan assets. During the trial, it emerged that senior directors at Tullow had discussed making an "undocumented" $50 million payment to the Ugandan government before considering funding parts of President Yoweri Museveni's re-election campaign. Angus McCoss, an exploration director at Tullow, suggested to other executives in a group email in April 2010 that the company should pay for an oil licence to "meet the short term needs and demands" of President Museveni. Graham Martin, Tullow company secretary, responded firmly in court, saying this was an "outrageous suggestion".

Tullow's vice president for Africa, Tim O'Hanlon, was also alleged to have suggested that Museveni slur Heritage as part of a deal to settle the tax dispute. Additionally, it was brought up that Tullow's CEO, Aidan Heavey, is a known donor to the Conservatives, having donated more than £50,000. President Museveni denied the bribery claims in an official statement on 18 March 2013. The statement caused some controversy for the court case as he went on to claim within that Tullow Oil completed the tax payment in order to successfully transact business within the country, a claim that Tullow denied in court. In a public statement in Uganda, Jimmy Mugerwa (Tullow Uganda) deeply regretted the embarrassment caused by "false allegations" and quoted a personal letter from Aidan Heavey to President Museveni, which stressed Tullow's history of "fair and ethical dealings".

During the court case, Graham Martin, Tullow's General Counsel, was criticised by Heritage's QC for disposing of hand-written notes potentially relevant to the proceedings. Martin rejected the criticism and stated that he had destroyed the notes when he had periodically cleared his office in Kampala in 2010–12. On 14 June 2013, it was announced that Tullow Oil won the arbitration of the court case with Heritage Oil.

=== Tax avoidance, donations and other issues ===
In February 2013, Platform London, an environmental campaigning group, released a report that alleged that Tullow Oil was avoiding UK tax by minimising the amount of profit that passes through the company's UK books and routing it through an international network of subsidiaries instead. The report also accused the firm of exploiting international legal mechanisms in Uganda to avoid tax.

In March 2013, British government ministers were implicated in receiving business-related donations from oil and resources companies including Tullow Oil. A report by the World Development Movement (a political campaigning group) alleged "that one third of ministers in the UK government are linked to the finance and energy companies driving climate change" and that "Government figures were embroiled in the nexus of money and power fuelling climate change include William Hague, George Osborne, Michael Gove, Oliver Letwin, Vince Cable and Prime Minister David Cameron himself. Both William Hague and Michael Gove were said to have connections to Tullow; Hague reportedly telephoned the president of Uganda to lobby for the firm's £175 million tax bill to be waived, while Tullow's CEO, Aidan Heavey, donated £10,000 to education secretary Gove before the 2010 general election.

Tullow ran into difficulties in July 2013 after pastoralists in the Turkana County of Kenya rejected the firm's proposal to move to a new exploration site at the Twiga 2 oil site in the Lokichar basin. They complained that the ongoing oil exploration in the region has interfered with pasture land and that future pastures for their animals would be decimated. In late October 2013, local communities in Turkana County staged demonstrations demanding jobs and other benefits from any potential future operations in the region, prompting the firm to suspend drilling and sending the firm's share price down. The locals also managed to gain entry to facilities and two oil blocks, resulting in looting and vandalism. Resumption of drilling was only achieved after peace talks were agreed with local leaders in mid-November.

In July 2013, Tullow Oil was accused of dumping two trucks of human waste in Kakindo village in Western Uganda, causing serious health risks to locals and a number of diseases. The incident was blamed by the firm on its subcontractor, Saracen Uganda Limited, who in turn blamed another contractor they used. However, the incident did not do well for the firm's reputation in the country after it drew the wrath of members of parliament. Tullow said the entire responsibility lay with its contractors, who they believed were cutting corners. The incident was also not the first time the firm had been accused of illegal waste dumping, with reports in 2012 claiming the firm dumped toxic drilling waste in a game park and other areas occupied by people.

=== Recent events ===
In April 2014, Tullow braced itself for a substantial investor backlash over excessive payouts to senior directors at the company. CEO Aidan Heavey came under particular scrutiny after it emerged that his pay had risen from £2.6 million to £2.8 million in 2013, despite Tullow's share price decreasing by as much as 30 percent during that period.

On 17 March 2017, Tullow announced a $750 million rights issue as the oil producer struggled with a very low oil price.

In April 2018, the company's founder Aidan Heavey retired from the board and Dorothy Thompson became the new chair of the board. CEO Paul McDade resigned in December 2019 and Dorothy Thompson was appointed as executive chair until a new CEO was appointed. In April 2020, Tullow announced that Rahul Dhir had been appointed as the new CEO with effect from July 2020.

On 23 April 2020 Tullow announced that it had agreed the sale of its assets in Uganda to Total for US$575 million in cash plus post first oil contingent payments with an effective date of 1 January 2020.

In 2021, Tullow Oil was ranked no. 49 in the Arctic Environmental Responsibility Index (AERI) that covers 120 oil, gas, and mining companies involved in resource extraction north of the Arctic Circle.

In a share-only merger, Tullow Oil acquired Capricorn Energy on 1 June 2022. After the deal closes, Tullow will own 53 percent of Capricorn. Capricorn Energy has assets in Mauritania and Egypt.

== Major projects ==
In late October 2013, Tullow announced it had plugged and abandoned a wildcat well offshore Norway in the Barents Sea due to "poor quality reservoir rock".

After prolonged exploration for oil and natural gas in French Guiana in partnership with Shell Oil, Tullow failed to find evidence of hydrocarbons in November 2013.

In March 2014, Tullow Oil was forced to invoke a force majeure clause on its oil production project offshore Guinea after the US Department of Justice and the Securities and Exchange Commission opened a corruption investigation into the firm's partner in the project, Hyperdynamics Corporation. Tullow took over the concessions to the project only a year previously in April 2013, and had plans to start drilling for oil in the second quarter of 2014. The delay set Tullow back notably in Guinea and the firm will only resume operations when the issues are resolved.
