= Hoima =

Capital in Western Region, Uganda

Hoima Hoima
- District capital
- Nickname: "Oil City"
- Motto: Oil is our Pride
- Location in Uganda
- Coordinates: 01°25′55″N 31°21′09″E
- Country: Uganda
- Region: Western Region
- Sub-region: Bunyoro sub-region
- District: Hoima District

Government
  - MP: 'Ruyonga Daniel for Hoima West and Isingoma Patrick for Hoima East city division
  - Mayor: Brian Kaboyo
- Elevation: 3,670 ft (1,120 m)

Population (2024 Estimate)
  - Total: 143,304
- Time zone: UTC+3 (EAT)
- Climate: AW
- Website: www.hoimacity.go.ug

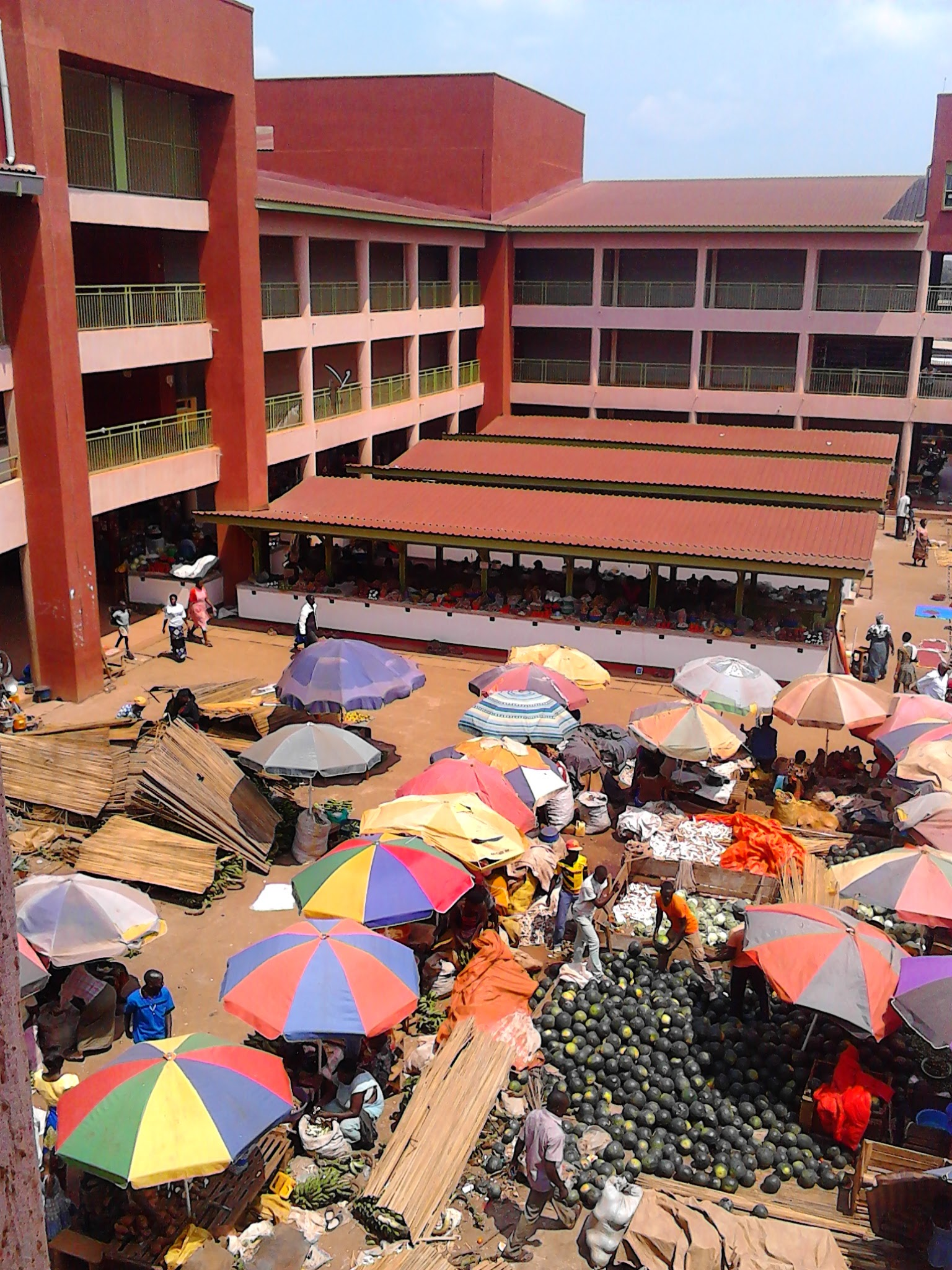
Sales going on at Hoima Market

Hoima is a city in the Western Region of Uganda and is the main municipal, administrative, and commercial center of Hoima District. It is also the location of the palace of the Omukama of Bunyoro.

== Location ==
Hoima is located approximately 200 kilometres (124 mi) northwest of Kampala, Uganda's largest city, on an all-weather tarmac highway, the Kampala–Hoima Road. The coordinates of Hoima City are 1°25'55.0"N 31°21'09.0"E (Latitude:1.431944; Longitude:31.352500).

== Population ==
According to the 2002 national census, the population of Hoima was enumerated at 60,561. In August 2014, the national population census put Hoima's population at 100,099. In 2020, the Uganda Bureau of Statistics (UBOS) estimated the mid-year population of the city at 122,700. UBOS calculated the population growth of Hoima to average 3.54 percent annually between 2014 and 2020.

Historical population
| Year | Pop. | ±% |
|---|---|---|
| 2002 | 60,561 | — |
| 2014 | 100,099 | +65.3% |
| 2020 | 122,700 | +22.6% |

== Economic activity ==
Between 2000 and 2009, a considerable amount of oil deposits, estimated at between 2.5 billion to 3.5 billion barrels, were discovered in Lake Albert and on the shores of the lake in Hoima District and the neighboring Buliisa District. An oil refinery, the Uganda Oil Refinery, is planned in Kabaale Village, Buseruka Sub-county, Hoima District, approximately 34 kilometres (21 mi), west of Hoima. An oil pipeline, the Uganda-Tanzania Crude Oil Pipeline, is also planned to evacuate crude oil to the Tanzanian Indian Ocean port of Tanga. Consequently, Hoima is poised to become a hub of economic activity.

In January 2018, SBC Uganda Limited, a joint venture company between Colas Limited of the United Kingdom and SBI International Holdings of Uganda, started construction of Hoima International Airport, at Kabaale Village, Buseruka sub-county, Hoima District, approximately 35 kilometres (22 mi), by road, to the west-northwest of the city of Hoima.

The first phase of construction, including the runway and cargo-handling facilities, is expected to be ready in 2020. This phase is primarily to support construction of the oil refinery. The second phase of construction, focused on the facilitation of passengers and boosting tourism and business, is expected to conclude in 2022. The project is expected to create about 1,000 jobs.

Because of the increased economic activity in the area, Hoima has been upgraded to municipality status, with increased infrastructure to handle the new businesses and new residents. Land prices, rental rates, and other real estate costs in Hoima have gone up recently, as demand for real estate in the town and surrounding areas has increased.

== Transport ==
The city will be served by Hoima International Airport which is currently under construction and expected to be completed by December 2023.

== Points of interest ==
The following additional points of interest are found within the city limits or close to its edges: (a) Orukurato rw'Obukama bwa Bunyoro-Kitara (Bunyoro-Kitara Kingdom parliament (b) Ekikaali Kya (Kings palace of) Karuziika (c) Western campus of Gulu University (d) the headquarters of Hoima District Administration (e) offices of Hoima City Council (f) a branch of the National Social Security Fund (g) Hoima Regional Referral Hospital, a 268-bed public hospital administered by the Uganda Ministry of Health.

== Education ==
=== Pre-primary Education ===
The district has close to 270 Early Childhood Development (ECD) Centres which are privately owned by the Faith Based Founded, community and individually owned. Majority of the ECD centres are in the urban settings. The total pre-primary enrolment is 4,460; with 2,194 males and 2,266 females (Education Department, 2019).

=== Primary school Education ===
According to the UBOS population projections, the net primary enrolment was about 131,320 in 2019. Of these, 56% are males and 43% are females.

=== Secondary school Education ===
The current number of secondary schools is 5(District Education Department Report for FY 2020/2021). Secondary school enrolment is 20,493 students out of which 10,322 (50.3%) are males and 10,171 (49.7%) are females presenting gender disparities in favor of boys.

Some of the performing Secondary schools in Hoima

1. St. Andrea Kaahwa's Collage - Bujumbura, P.O. Box 153, Hoima
2. Sir Tiyo Winyi Secondary School - Masindi Road-Dar es Salaam, P.O. Box 136, Hoima
3. Buhimba Secondary School - Fort Portal Road, P.O. Box 218, Hoima
4. Hoima High School - Old Toro Road, P.O. Box 198, Hoima
5. Mandela Senior Secondary School

== See also ==
- Bunyoro sub-region
- Orunyege-Ntogoro
- List of cities and towns in Uganda
