= Hoima District =

- District
- District location in Uganda
- Coordinates: 01°25′N 31°05′E
- Country: Uganda
- Region: Western Uganda
- Sub-region: Bunyoro sub-region
- Capital: Hoima

Area
  - Land: 3,664.1 km^{2} (1,414.7 sq mi)

Population (2012 Estimate)
  - Total: 548,800
  - Density: 149.8/km^{2} (388/sq mi)
- Time zone: UTC+3 (EAT)
- Website: www.hoima.go.ug

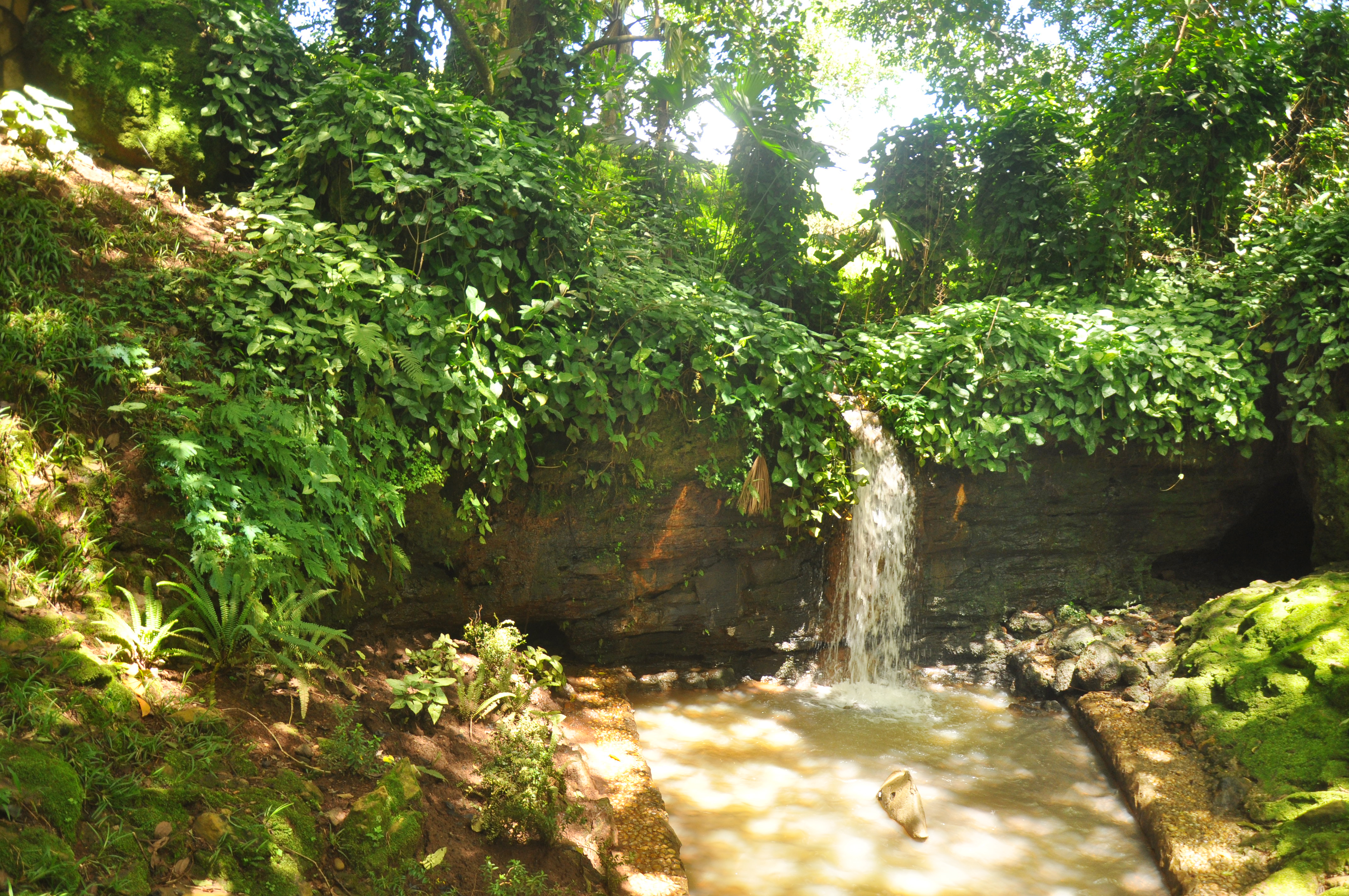
Katasiha Fort, also known as Katasiha Palace, is a historical site located in Hoima district, Uganda.

Hoima District is a district in Western Uganda. Like most other Ugandan districts, it is named after its main municipal centre, Hoima.

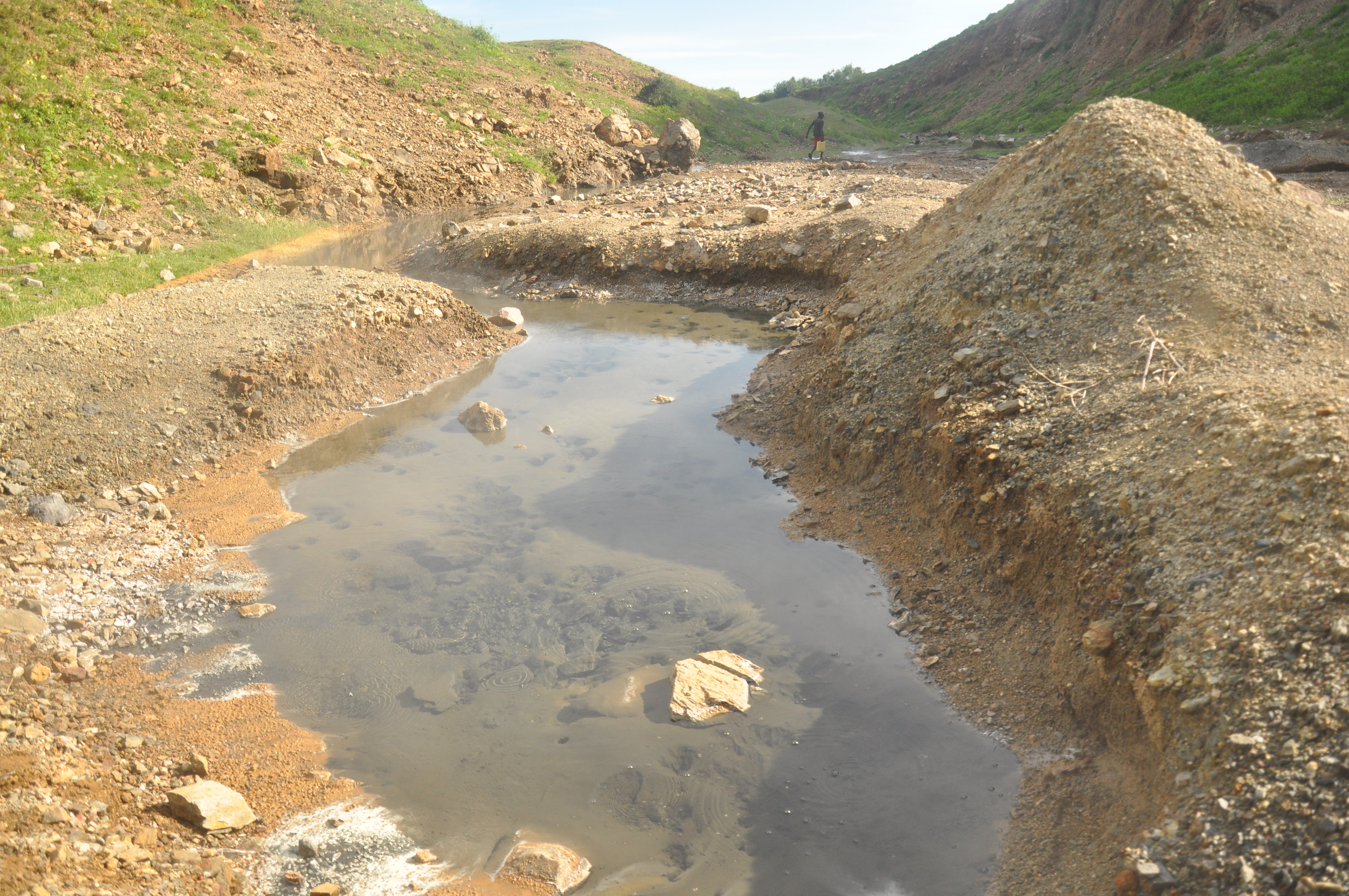
Kibiro Hot Spring, located in Hoima district.

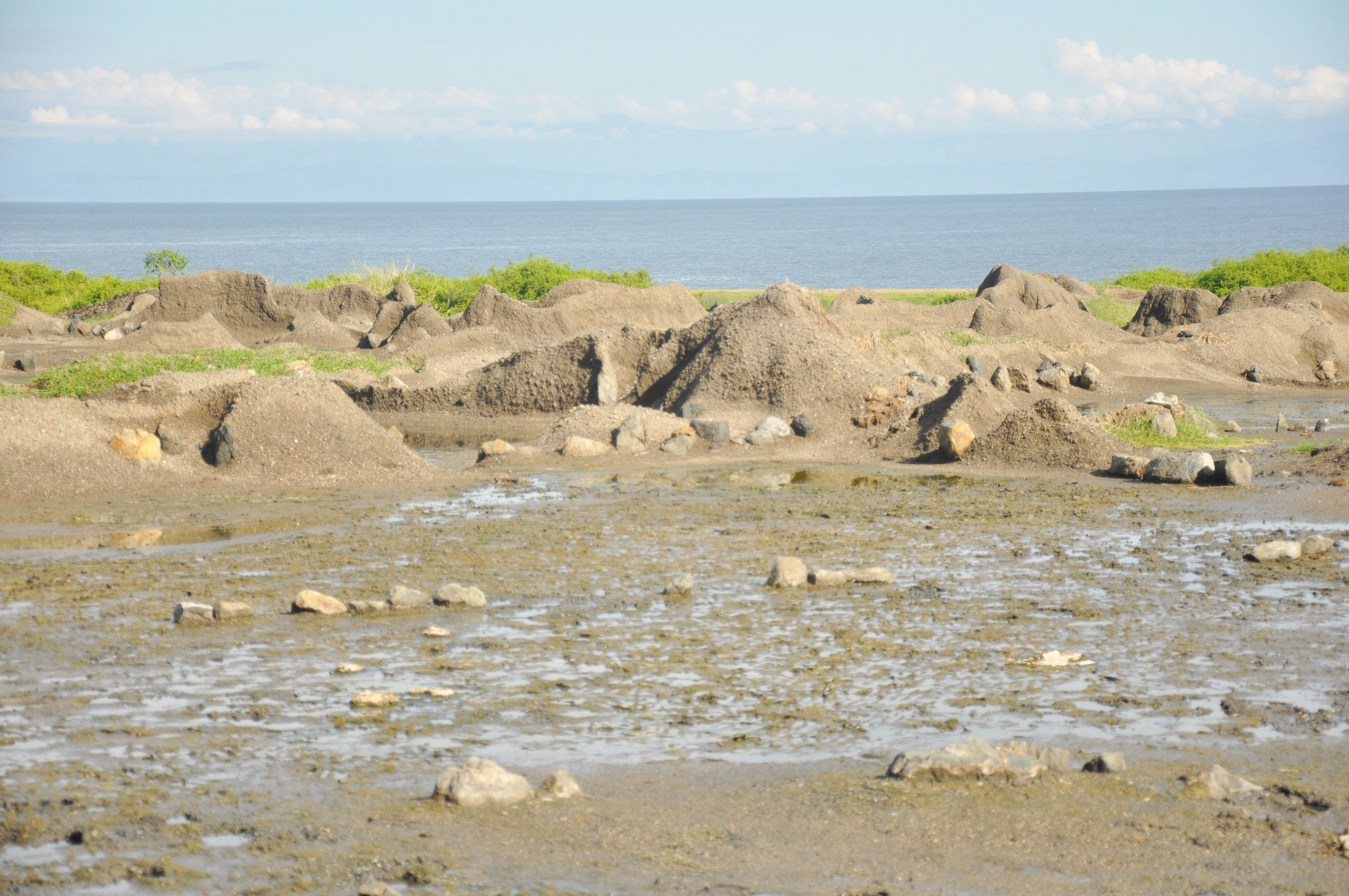
Kibiro Salt Gardens, located in Hoima district

== Location ==
Hoima District is bordered by Buliisa District to the north, Masindi District to the northeast, Kyankwanzi District in the east, Kibaale District to the south, Ntoroko District to the southwest and the Democratic Republic of the Congo across Lake Albert to the west. Hoima, the location of the district headquarters, is located approximately 230 kilometres (140 mi) northwest of Kampala, Uganda's capital and largest city. The coordinates of the district are:01 24N, 31 18E.

Hoima district is divided into different administrative units as follow.

=== Bugahya County ===
- Buhanika Sub-county - Butema, Katereiga, Kikerege, Kitonya, Kitorogya, and Kyohairwe parish.
- Bulindi Town Council - Crntral ward, Kakindo ward, and Kibaire ward.
- Buraru Sub-county - Buraru, Busanga, Buyanja, and Kyabanati parish.
- Buseruka Sub-county - Buseruka, Nyakabingo, Rwentale, and Tonya.
- Kabaale Sub-county - Kabaare, Kigaaga, Nzorobi, and Muegu.
- Kitoba Sub-county - Birungu, Budaka, Bulyango, Kibanjwa, Kiryangobe, and Kiragura.
- Kyabigambire Sub-county - Kibugubya, Kisabagwa.

=== Kigorobya County ===
- Kigorobya Sub-county - Hanha and Kyabisagazi.
- Kigorobya Town Council - North East ward, Northern Ward, South East Ward, and South West ward.
- Bombo Sub-county - Buhirigi, Bwikya, Hanga, Kanyiira, and Marongo parish.
- Kapaapi Sub-county - Kapaapi, Kibengeya, and Kyamukwenda.
- Kiganja Sub-county - Kibiro, Kiganja, Kityandongo and Kyeramya parish.
- Kijongo Sub-county - Karungu, Kigomba, and Kijongo.
- Kisukuma Sub-county - Bukona, Haibale, Kabatindule, Kisukuma and Ngaragi parish.

== Overview ==
Hoima District, Buliisa District, Kibaale District, Kiryandongo District, Kakumiro District, Kagadi District and Masindi District, constitute Bunyoro sub-region, which is coterminous with the Kingdom of Bunyoro. The palace of the Omukama of Bunyoro is located in Hoima.

== Population ==
During the 1991 national population census, the population of Hoima District was about 197,850. In 2002, the national census that year, estimated the population of the district at bout 343,620, with an annual population growth rate of 2.8%. In 2012, the mid-year district population was estimated at 548,800. According to the UBOS census report, in 2014 the population of Hoima was 205,432 and in 2024 was 257,544.

Hoima Town Population Trends

Year	Est. Pop.
2002	343,600
2003	353,200
2004	363,100

Year	Est. Pop.
2005	373,300
2006	383,700
2007	394,500

Year	Est. Pop.
2008	405,500
2009	416,900
2010	428,500

== Economic activity ==
Agriculture with emphasis on food crops is the backbone of the district economy. Crops grown include:

- Sorghum
- Maize
- Millet
- Peas
- Groundnuts
- Sunflowers
- Sweet potatoes
- Beans
- Cotton
- Tea
- Coffee
- Tomatoes
- Cabbage
- Onions
- Tobacco

Fishing on Lake Albert employs several hundred people.

The recent discovery of petroleum in the district is increasingly attracting people from the district in the many activities that the industry entails. The Hoima crude oil pipeline project has created over 10,000 job opportunities to people.

== Livestock ==
- Cattle
- Goats
- Chicken

== See also ==
- Hoima
- Bunyoro sub-region
- Omukama of Bunyoro
- Western Region, Uganda
- Kyakapeya
- Parliament of Uganda
- Districts of Uganda
- Bunyoro
