= Political history of East Africa =

The following is a list of key events in the political history of East Africa.

== Antiquity ==
- 25th century BC: Earliest recorded Egyptian expedition to the Land of Punt in the Horn of Africa organized by Pharaoh Sahure of the Fifth Dynasty.
- c. 800 BC: Foundation of the Kingdom of D`mt in northern Ethiopia and Eritrea (capital: Yeha)
- c. 1st century AD: Periplus of the Erythraean Sea reports trade connecting Somalis in present-day Berbera and Ras Hafun in northern Somalia to other communities along the Indian coast.
- c. 250: Foundation of the Kingdom of Aksum, in northern Ethiopia and Eritrea (capital: Axum)
- c. 614 AD: Islam is first introduced into northern Somalia.
- 7th century: Foundation of the Sultanate of Zeila in the Awdal region of modern-day Somalia.
- c. 950: Possible conquest of Axum by Gudit, continued by the Zagwe dynasty
- 957: Foundation of the Sultanate of Kilwa Kisiwani, in Tanzania.
- c. 11th century – 13th century – founding of numerous Sultanates in Ethiopia (Muslim in the east, Pagan and Muslim in the west), including Bale, Damot, Dawaro, Fetegar, Hadiya Kingdom, Ifat, Mora, Shewa (see also Shewa), and Wag.
- c. 1137: A later possible date for the rise of the Zagwe and fall of Aksum.
- 1203: Foundation of the Sultanate of Pate, in Kenya, splitting from the Kingdom of Kilwa Kisiwani.
- c. 1250: Foundation of the Kingdom of Welayta, in Ethiopia. Ruled by the Tegra'i dynasty from the 17th century.
- 1250-1300: Foundation of the Sultanate of Mogadishu in Somalia.
- 1270: Solomonic dynasty comes to prominence in Ethiopia, displacing the Zagwe dynasty rulers.
- 14th century: Foundation of the Kingdom of Malindi, in Kenya. Foundation of the Kingdom of Ambohidratima, in Madagascar. Foundation of the Kingdom of Buganda, in Uganda.
- c. 1330: Foundation of the Kingdom of Munhumutapa Empire, in Zimbabwe.
- 1331: Ibn Battuta visits Mogadishu in Somalia.
- 1332: Foundation of the Adal Sultanate in present-day northwestern Somalia, southern Djibouti, and the Somali, Oromia, and Afar regions of Ethiopia.
- c. 1390: Foundation of the Kingdom of Kaffa in Ethiopia.

== Islam expansion and early European conquests ==
- 15th century: Foundation of the Karemera dynasty in Burundi, replaced by the Baganwa dynasty before the end of the 17th century. Foundation of the Rwanda Kingdom, rules by the Naoro dynasty from the 16th century. Foundation of the Kingdoms of Ankole and Bunyoro-Kitara, in Uganda.
- 1420: First mention of the Kingdom of Karanga, in Mozambique.
- c. 1450: Foundation of the Kingdom of Innarya, in Ethiopia.
- c. 1480: The Empire of Changamire proclaims independence from Karanga.
- 1485: Foundation of the Sultanate of Angoshe, in Mozambique.
- 1494: First mention of the Kingdom of Manyika, in Mozambique, under the Nguruve dynasty.
- 1 March 1498: Portugal claims Mozambique.
- 16th century: Foundation of the Kingdom of Pemba.
- c. 1500: Foundation of the Sultanate of Ndzuwani (Anjouan), in the Comoros. Foundation of the Sultanate of Maore, in Mayotte.
- 10 August 1500: Portugal discovers Madagascar.
- 1501: Portugal establishes the Captaincy of Sofala in Mozambique, a dependency of Goa, then settles at Mozambique Island in 1507, Sena in 1531 and Quelimane in 1534.
- 1502: Foundation of the Sultanate of Mombasa, in Kenya.
- 1503: Portugal discovers Comoros and Mayotte, and annexes Zanzibar in Tanzania.
- 1505: Portugal discovers Mauritius and names it Ilho de Cerne, then Mascarene Islands from 1513. Portugueses occupy Kilwa Kisiwani until 1512.
- 8 September 1507: The Captaincy of Sofala becomes the Captaincy of Sofala and Moçambique.
- c.1520: Oromo bands raid north across the Shebelle River, which over following generations leads to a migration into their modern northern and western territories.
- 1527: Beginning of invasion of Solomonic Ethiopia by Ahmad ibn Ibrihim al-Ghazi of Adal.
- 1528: Portugal discovers Ilha Rodriguez, in Mauritius.
- 1530s: Foundation of the Kingdom of Yengar, in Ethiopia, under the Mowa dynasty.
- 21 February 1543: Ahmad ibn Ibrihim al-Ghazi of Adal is defeated and killed in the Battle of Wayna Daga, ending Muslim rule over Ethiopia.
- c. 1550: Foundation of the Kingdom of Bulamogi, in Uganda. Foundation of the Kingdom of Bulozi, in Zambia.
- 1557: Massawa (in modern-day Eritrea) occupied by the Ottoman Empire, which becomes the start of the province of Habesh
- 1560: Foundation of the Kingdom of Sheka, in Ethiopia.
- 1567: Foundation of the Kingdom of Bosha, in Ethiopia.
- 1569: The Captaincy of Sofala and Moçambique becomes the Captaincy-general of Moçambique and separate from Goa.
- 1577: The Adal Sultanate in Ethiopia splits into the Kingdom of Harar, and the Imamate of Aussa.
- c. 1590: Foundation of the Kingdom of Imamo, in Madagascar.
- 1593: Portugal occupies Mombasa.
- 1597: Portugal conquers Kilwa Kisiwani.
- 20 September 1598: Netherlands claim Mascarene Islands.
- 17th century: Foundation of the Kingdom of Wanga, in Kenya. Foundation of the Kingdoms of Bara and Manandriana, in Madagascar. Foundation of the Kingdom of Malawi, it will ceases to exist at the end of the 19th century under British rule. Foundation of the Kingdoms of Bugama-Kiganda, Buhoma, Bukonya, Bushiru, Bwanamwari, Cyingogo, Kibari, Ruhengeri and Rwankeri, in Rwanda. Portugal conquers Pemba. Foundation of the Kingdom of Bemba, in Zambia. First mention of the Kingdom of Torwa, in Zimbabwe.
- c. 1600: Foundation of the Sultanate of Majerteen, in Somalia.
- 1609: The Captaincy-general of Moçambique becomes the colony of Moçambique, Sofala, Ríos de Cuama and Monomatapa, a dependency of Goa.
- 1615: Foundation of the Kingdom of Konta, in Ethiopia.
- 1625: Ilha Rodriguez is claimed by France under the name Rodrigues, settlements established from 1735.
- 1629: Portugal conquers Munhumutapa.
- c. 1635: Foundation of the Kingdom of Maungwe, in Zimbabwe.
- 1638: Portugal establishes a colony in Mombasa, a dependency of Goa.
- 7 May 1638: Mascarene Islands become a Dutch colony under the name Mauritius, controlled by the United East India Company. It will be abandoned 17 February 1710.
- 24 September 1642: Foundation of the French colony of Fort-Dauphin, in Madagascar. It will be abandoned 27 August 1674 and a vain effort to found it again will take place from 1768 to 1771.
- 1646: The Kingdom of Harar becomes an Emirate.
- December 1649: Réunion is annexed by France under the name Bourbon Island.
- c. 1650: Foundation of the Kingdom of Hadimu, in Tanzania.
- After 1672: End of the Imamate of Aussa
- 1 December 1674: Bourbon Island is under the rule of the French Eastern India Company.
- c. 1675: First mention of the Kingdom of Ambohimanga, in Madagascar, under the Imerina dynasty.
- c. 1680: Foundation of the Kingdom of Burundi. Torwa is annexed by Changamire.
- 1680: The Sultanate of Kilwa Kisiwani proclaims independence from Portugal.
- c. 1683: Foundation of the Kingdom of Busiki, in Uganda.
- c. 1685: Foundation of the Kingdom of Menabe, in Madagascar, under the Volamena dynasty.
- c. 1690: Foundation of the Kingdom of Boina, in Madagascar.
- 1695: Changamire conquers Manyika and places the Tembo-Shumba dynasty to govern it.
- 1698: Zanzibar and Pemba are ceded to Oman.
- 12 December 1698: Mombasa is ceded to the Sultanate of Oman, but is occupied again by the Portuguese from 12 March 1728 to 21 September 1729.
- 18th century: Foundation of the kingdoms of Arindrano, Fisakana, Isandra and Lalangina, in Madagascar. First mention of the Kingdom of Mpororo, in Uganda. Foundation of the Kingdoms of Bugabula, Bugweri Bufutulu, Bukono, Bukooli, Bukwanga Kiki, Bunha, Buzaaya, Buzimba-Busoga and Luuka, in Uganda. Foundation of the Kingdom of Kazembe, in Zambia. First mention of the Kingdom of Bocha, in Zimbabwe.
- c. 1700: The Kingdom of Kafa becomes an Empire.
- c. 1710: Foundation of the Kingdom of Tananarive, in Madagascar. First mention of the Kingdom of Nhowe, in Zimbabwe, under the Mangwende dynasty.
- 1712: Foundation of the Kingdom of Betsimisaraka, in Madagascar by Ratsimilaho.
- 6 September 1715: Mauritius is claimed by France under the name Isle de France, controlled by the Compagnie des Indes from 23 September 1721.
- March 1721: Netherlands settles at Fort Lijdzaamheid, in Mozambique, a dependency of Cape. The settlement will be abandoned 27 December 1730.
- 1734: Mudaito dynasty founds the Aussa Sultanate in Ethiopia.
- 4 June 1735: Isle de France is part of the colony of Mascarene Islands, until 23 March 1746.
- c. 1740: First mention of the Kingdom of Antakarana, in Madagascar. Foundation of the Kingdom of Mbire, in Zimbabwe.
- 19 November 1742: Seychelles are claimed by France under the name La Bourdonnais Islands, the Séchelles from 27 August 1770.
- c. 1744: Foundation of the Kingdom of Shavasha, in Zimbabwe, under the Chinamhora dynasty.
- 1746: The Sultanate of Mombasa, in Kenya, proclaims independence from Oman.
- c. 1750: Pemba gains autonomy from Oman.
- 1750: First mention of the Sheikhdom of Kitangonya, in Mozambique.
- 26 July 1750: Betsimisaraka cedes Sainte-Marie de Madagascar to France.
- 1752: The colony of Moçambique, Sofala, Ríos de Cuama and Monomatapa becomes the colony of Moçambique, Zambesi and Sofala. Dissolution of the Kingdom of Mpororo into the Kingdoms of Igara, Kajara, Nshenyi, Obwera, Rujumbura, Rukiga.
- 1753: Foundation of the Sheikhdom of Sankul, in Mozambique.
- c. 1760: Foundation of the Kingdom of Walo, in Ethiopia, under the Mamadoch dynasty.
- 1764: Bourbon Island becomes a crown colony of France.
- 14 July 1767: Isle de France becomes a crown colony.
- 1771: Hadimu is under Omani suzerainty.
- 11 February 1774: Foundation of the Kingdom of Antogil, in Madagascar, by a Hungarian adventurer.
- 1780s: First mention of the Kingdom of Ufipa, in Tanzania.
- 23 May 1786: Antogil is annexed to France.
- c. 1788: Foundation of the Kingdom of Govera, in Zimbabwe.
- c. 1790: Foundation of the Kingdom of Jimma, in Ethiopia
- 19 March 1793: Bourbon Island is renamed Réunion Island.
- 1794: Tananarive is annexed to Ambohimanga.
- 17 May 1794: Séchelles are occupied by the United Kingdom.
- c. 1795: Foundation of the Kingdom of Nkamanga, in Malawi.
- 1797: Ambohidratima is annexed to Ambohimanga.
- 25 October 1797: Isle de France and Réunion become départements, until 19 April 1801.
- 19th century: Andrindrano, Bara, Fisakana, Imamo and Mananddriana are annexed to Madagascar. Foundation of the Kingdom of Maseko, in Malawi. First mention of the Kingdoms of Buddu, Buhindi, Bukome, Ilole, Kimwani, Lungemba, Udongwe and Usangu, in Tanzania. Foundation of the Kingdom of Tumbatu, in Tanzania. First mention of the Kingdoms of Buhweju, Bunyaruguru and Kigulu, in Uganda.
- c. 1800: Ennarea is known as Limmu-Ennarea. Foundation of the kingdoms of Gera, Goma and Kingdom of Gumma, in Ethiopia. The Kingdom of Lyangalile proclaims independence from Ufipa.

== Acceleration of European colonization ==
- 3 February 1803: Isle de France and Réunion are parts of the colony of French East India, until 2 September 1810. Séchelles are also nominally part of it, despite the British occupation.
- 15 August 1806: Réunion Island is renamed Bonaparte Island.
- 4 August 1809: The United Kingdom occupies Rodrigues.
- 1810: Isandra and Lalangina are annexed to Ambohimanga. First mention of the Kingdom of Buzinja, in Tanzania.
- 17 May 1810: Séchelles are annexed by the United Kingdom, under the name Seychelles, as a colony subordinated to Mauritius, confirmed 30 May 1814 by the Treaty of Paris.
- 9 July 1810: Bonaparte Island is occupied by the United Kingdom.
- 7 August 1810: Bonaparte Island is renamed Bourbon Island.
- 3 December 1810: Isle de France is ceded to the United Kingdom, and becomes the colony of Mauritius. This possession is confirmed 30 May 1814 by the Treaty of Paris.
- December 1813: northern Ethiopia (modern-day northern Eritrea) is occupied by Egypt until 1826.
- 30 May 1814: Rodrigues is annexed by the United Kingdom as a dependency of Mauritius.
- 1815: Foundation of the Kingdom of Jere, in Malawi. First mention of the Kingdom of Shambalai, in Tanzania.
- April 1815: Bourbon Island is ceded back to France.
- 23 October 1817: The Kingdom of Ambohimanga becomes the Kingdom of Madagascar. Betsimisaraka becomes later its vassal.
- c. 1818: First mention of the Kingdom of Buima, in Uganda.
- 15 October 1818: Sainte-Marie de Madagascar is a dependence of Bourbon Islande, then of Mayotte from 2 March 1843.
- c. 1820: Foundation of the Kingdom of Mhari, in Zimbabwe.
- 1820: First mention of the Kingdom of Karagwe, in Tanzania.
- 1821: The Kingdom of Ndebele proclaims independence from the Kingdom of Zulu, installing themselves in Zimbabwe from November 1837.
- 1822: Foundation of the Kingdom of Tooro, in Uganda.
- 20 March 1822: Foundation of the Kingdom of Tanibe, in Madagascar.
- 9 February 1824: The United Kingdom establishes a protectorate over Mombasa.
- 1825: Foundation of the Kingdom of AmaGaza, in Mozambique.
- 25 July 1826: Oman puts an end to the secession of Mombasa.
- 1828: Betsimisaraka and Tanibe are annexed to Madagascar.
- 1830: The Sultanate of Mwali (Mohéli) splits from the Sultanate of Ndzuwani (Anjouan), created by migrants from Madagascar.
- 1832: Boina is occupied by Madagascar.
- 1833: Maore (Mayotte) is annexed by Mohéli.
- 1834: Menabe is annexed to Madagascar.
- 19 November 1835: Maore is annexed from Mohéli by Anjouan.
- 1836: Maore proclaims independence from Anjouan.
- March 1836: The colony of Moçambique, Zambesi and Sofala is now known as Moçambique, also called Portuguese East Africa.
- 24 June 1837: Mombasa is annexed to Zanzibar.
- 1839: The Kingdom of Shewa proclaims independence from Ethiopia.
- 1840s: Foundation of the Kingdom of Nandi, in Kenya. First mention of the Sultanate of Geledi, in Somalia.
- 1840: Boina is annexed to Madagascar.
- 14 July 1840: Foundation of the French colony of Nossi-Bé, in Madagascar, a dependence of Bourbon Island, then of Mayotte from 25 March 1843.
- 25 March 1841: France establishes a protectorate over Maore under the name Mayotte as a dependency of Île Bourbon, officially from 13 June 1843, and abolishes the monarchy.
- 1842: Zanzibar annexes Kilwa Kisiwani.
- 1843: Antakarana is under a French protectorate until 1891.
- 6 September 1848: Bourbon Island is renamed Réunion Island.
- c. 1850: First mention of the Kingdom of Ussuwi, in Tanzania.
- 1853: Sainte-Marie de Madagascar becomes a separate colony until 27 October 1876 when it becomes a dependency of Réunion, then of Diégo Suarez 4 May 1888.
- 1855: Reunification of Ethiopia after a century of decentralization during the Zemene Mesafint.
- 1856: Zanzibar annexes Tumbatu.
- 1857: The United Kingdom annexes Changamire, under the administration of the British South Africa Company.
- c. 1858: First mention of the Kingdom of Buhera, in Zimbabwe.
- 1858: France settles in Obock, in Djibouti. Foundation of the Sultanate of Witu, in Kenya.
- c. 1860: First mention of the Kingdoms of Bugabo, Bukwara, Nguluhe, Ubena and Unyanyembe in Tanzania.
- 6 April 1861: Zanzibar proclaims independence from Oman, annexes Pemba and abolishes its autonomy from c. 1865.
- 1865: Egypt invades northern Ethiopia, temporarily occupying parts of what is now northern Eritrea. The Kingdom of Bwina proclaims independence from Kimwani.
- 1866: Anjouan is annexed to Mayotte.
- 1867: First mention of the Kingdom of Bugando, in Tanzania.
- 1870s: Foundation of the Kingdom of Maasai, in Kenya, after the union of the clans.
- c. 1870: First mention of the Kingdom of Kitagwenda, in Uganda.
- 1870: Pate is annexed to Witu. First mention of the Kingdom of Wiziba, in Tanzania.
- 1871: Mogadisho is annexed to Zanzibar. The Kingdom of Unyamwezi proclaims independence from Unyanyembe.
- 1873: Monarchy is abolished in Hadimu.
- c. 1875: First mention of the Kingdom of Ihangiro, in Tanzania. First mention of the Kingdom of Buzimba, in Uganda.
- 11 October 1875: Harar is occupied by Egypt until 1884.
- 7 September 1877: Northern Somalia, then part of the Ottoman Empire, is annexed by Egypt under the name Egyptian Somaliland.
- 1878: Nossi-Bé becomes a separate colony. The Sultanate of Hobyo proclaims independence from Majerteen.
- 1879: Asmara, in Eritrea, is recaptured by Ethiopia.
- 1882: The kingdoms of Leqa Qellam and Gera are annexed to the Ethiopian vassal kingdom of Shewa in Ethiopia.
- 5 July 1882: Asseb, part of the vassal Ethiopian Afar sultanate (in modern Eritrea), is conquered by Italy.
- 1883: Bosha is annexed to Ethiopia.

== Era of colonies and protectorates ==
- 1884: First mention of the Kingdom of Kooki, in Uganda.
- February 1884: The United Kingdom annexes the Egyptian Somaliland.
- 24 June 1884: Foundation of the French Protectorate of Obock, recognized by the United Kingdom 8 February 1888.
- August 1884: Burundi and Rwanda become German protectorates.
- 17 February 1885: The Sultanate of Zanzibar is under a German protectorate, a part of it is ceded to the German East Africa Company and will be known under the name German East Africa from 27 May 1885,
- 27 May 1885: The Kingdom of Witu, in Kenya is under a German protectorate under the name of Wituland, not recognized by the United Kingdom.
- 1886: Grande Comore, in the Comoros, is united under the sultan of Bambao. Goma is annexed to Ethiopia. Diégo Suarez, in Madagascar, becomes a French colony. First mention of the Kingdom of Kome, in Tanzania.
- 21 April 1886: Anjouan becomes a French protectorate.
- 26 April 1886: Mohéli becomes a French protectorate.
- 24 June 1886: Grande Comore becomes a French protectorate.
- 26 January 1887: Harar is annexed to Shewa.
- 25 May 1887: The Sultanate of Zanzibar cedes Mombasa to the British East Africa Association.
- 20 July 1887: Egyptian Somaliland becomes a protectorate under the name British Somaliland, subordinated to the colony of Aden until 1905.
- 5 September 1887: Anjouan, Grande Comore and Mohéli are united under the name Protectorate of the Comoros.
- 1888: Maasai, Nandi and Wanga are annexed to the territory of the British East Africa Association, but the monarchies remains. First mention of the Kingdom of Kyamutwara, in Tanzania.
- 11 February 1888: Ndebele becomes a British protectorate as Matabeleland, under the administration of the British South Africa Company.
- 3 September 1888: The territory of the becomes the colony of East Africa, under the Imperial British East Africa Company.
- December 1888: Hobyo become an Italian protectorate.
- 9 December 1888: Foundation of the Italian Protectorate of Assab.
- 1889: The kingdoms of Dawaro, Konta are annexed to Ethiopia and Shewa ceases to exist as a vassal kingdom of Ethiopia as its ruler becomes Emperor of all of Ethiopia. Bulozi becomes a British protectorate under the name Barotseland.
- 7 April 1889: Majerteen becomes an Italian protectorate.
- 2 May 1889: The Treaty of Uccialli is signed. The Ethiopian version states that Ethiopia may conduct foreign relations through Italy, while the Italian version states that Ethiopia is Italy's protectorate, later resulting in the First Italo-Abyssinian War.
- 3 August 1889: Italy establishes a protectorate over Benadir Coast, in Somalia.
- 21 September 1889: The United Kingdom establishes a protectorate over Jere, Malawi, Maseko and Nkamanga, under the name Shiré River.
- 29 October 1889: The United Kingdom establishes a protectorate over the Kingdoms of Bocha, Buhera, Govera, Maungwe, Mbire, Mhari, Nhowe and Shavasha under the name Mashonaland, administered by the British South Africa Company.
- c. 1890: First mention of the Kingdom of Kiyanja, in Tanzania.
- 1 January 1890: The Protectorate of Assab becomes the colony of Eritrea.
- 18 June 1890: The United Kingdom establishes a protectorate over Witu, Germany renounces his claims 1 July 1890.
- 1 July 1890: Burundi and Rwanda are parts of the German East Africa. The Burundian king is forced to recognize German authority 24 May 1903. The United Kingdom declares a protectorate over Buganda and occupies it under the British East Africa Company from 18 December.
- 7 November 1890: Zanzibar becomes a British protectorate.
- 1891: Limu-Innarya is annexed to Ethiopia.
- 1 January 1891: German East Africa becomes a colony.
- 15 May 1891: Shiré River is now known as Nyasaland Districts.
- 1892: The German Empire sends expeditions to Rwanda. Mogadisho is under an Italian protectorate.
- 6 January 1892: The sultanates of Bajini, Hamahame, Hamamvu, Hambu, Itsandra, La Dombe, Mbaku, Mbude, Mitsamihuli and Washili, in Grande Comore, are suppressed by France. The Sultanate of Grande Comore is suppressed 19 September 1893.
- 23 February 1893: Nyasaland Districts is now known as British Central Africa, under the administration of the British South Africa Company.
- 1894: Yengar is annexed to Ethiopia.
- 23 January 1894: Foundation of the North Zambesia protectorate by the union of Barotseland and the new protectorate of Bemba. Foundation of the South Zambesia protectorate by the union of the protectorates of Mashonaland and Matabeleland.
- 11 April 1894: The British protectorate over Buganda is effective, and extended to Ankole, Bunyoro-Kitara and Tooro on 30 June 1896.
- November 1894: Walayta is annexed to Ethiopia.
- 1895: Antakarana is annexed to Madagascar. First mention of the Kingdom of Bukerewe, in Tanzania.
- 3 May 1895: Foundation of the British protectorate of Rhodesia by the union of North Zambesia and South Zambesia, under the administration of the British South Africa Company.
- 1 July 1895: The British colony of East Africa is expanded from territories of Zanzibar and becomes the British East Africa Protectorate.
- c. 1896: First mention of the Kingdom of Butundwe, in Tanzania.
- 1896: A German military station is established at Kajaga, in Burundi, rendering effective the control of the region. The German Empire creates the military districts of Tanganyika-Kivu (comprising Rwanda) and Ujiji (comprising Burundi) inside the German East Africa. The next year the station is relocated to Usumbura.
- 28 January 1896: Sainte-Marie de Madagascar is annexed to Madagascar.
- 1 March 1896: Ethiopian victory over Italians at Battle of Adowa during the First Italo-Abyssinian war ensures its independence.
- 30 March 1896: Mayotte is a dependency of Madagascar.
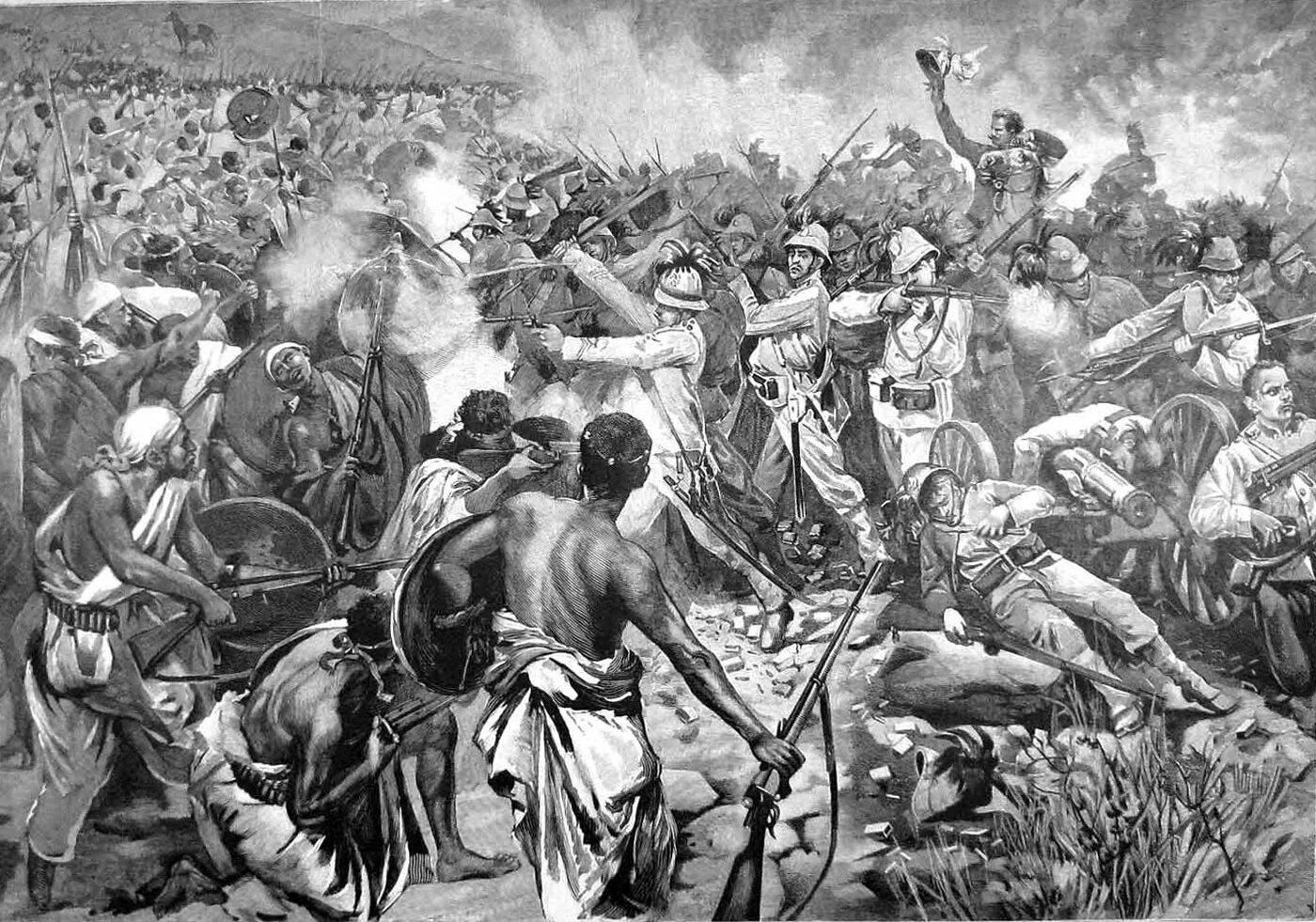
  Ethiopian victory over Italians at Battle of Adowa in 1896
- 20 May 1896: The Protectorate of Obock becomes French Somaliland.
- 30 June 1896: Ankole, Bunyoro-Kitiara and Tooro become British protectorates.
- 6 August 1896: Diégo Suarez and Nossi-Bé are annexed to Madagascar, whose statute is now a French protectorate.
- 26 October 1896: Italy cease to claim a protectorate over Ethiopia.
- 14 November 1896: Kooki is annexed to Buganda.
- 28 February 1897: Madagascar becomes a colony.
- 20 July 1897: Monarchy is abolished in AmaGaza, after attempts beginning from 28 December 1895.
- 10 September 1897: Kafa is annexed to Ethiopia.
- 1898: Sheka is annexed to Ethiopia.
- 19 July 1898: Foundation of the Sultanate of Uhehe by the union of the Kingdoms of Ilole, Lungemba, Nguluhe, Udongwe and Usangu.
- 1899: The military district of Usumbura, including Burundi and Rwanda, is created within the German East Africa. Kazembe becomes a British protectorate administered by the British South Africa Company.
- 20th century: The monarchy is abolished in Kitangonya and Nkamanga. The Kingdom of Ruhangeri is annexed to Rwanda.
- 29 January 1900: Rhodesia is divided into two autonomous entities: Northern Rhodesia and Southern Rhodesia.
- 1901: The Kingdom of Nyamutureza proclaims independence from Buzinja.
- 25 October 1901: Buhweju, Bunyaruguru, Buzimba, Igara, Kitagwenda, Kajara, Nshenyi, Obwera, Rujumbura and Rukiga are annexed to Ankole.
- 1902: Guma is annexed to Ethiopia. The monarchy is abolished in Karanga.
- 31 August 1903: Seychelles are a crown colony of the United Kingdom.
- 1904: Kazembe is annexed to North Rhodesia.
- 1905: Monarchy is abolished in Nandi.
- 16 March 1905: Benadir Coast and Mogadisho become a colony under the name Italian Somaliland, a crown colony from July 1910.
- 1 April 1905: Uganda becomes a colony.
- 1906: Burundi becomes a military residency of the German Empire.
- July 1906: Foundation of the Kingdom of Busoga from the union of the Kingdoms of Bugabula, Bugweri Bufutulu, Buima, Bukono, Bukooli, Bukwanga Kiki, Bulamogi, Bunha, Busiki, Buzaaya, Buzimba-Busoga, Kigulu and Luuka.
- 1907: Bukome is annexed to Ussuwi.
- 6 July 1907: British Central Africa is now known as Nyasaland.
- 15 November 1907: The military residency of Burundi is split between the civil residencies of Ruanda and Urundi.
- 9 April 1908: Comoros is a dependency of Madagascar.
- 3 September 1908: Geledi is annexed to Italian Somaliland.
- 1910: The monarch is abolished in Angoshe and Sankul.
- 25 July 1912: Comoros is annexed to Mayotte. In the same time the sultanates of Anjouan and Mohéli are abolished.

== Colonies and mandates ==
- 23 February 1914: Comoros become a dependency of Madagascar.
- 1916: The Kingdoms of Bugama-Kiganda and Cyingogo are annexed to Ruanda. Bukwara is annexed to Kyamutwara.
- 19 May 1916: Belgium begins conquest of German East Africa, completed 18 September 1916, except for the area that will be known as Tanganyika.
- 9 October 1916: The United Kingdom begins conquest of Tanganyika, completed 14 November 1918.
- 1918: Monarchy is abolished in Maasai.
- 1919: The Kingdoms of Bushiru and Bwanamwari are annexed to Ruanda.
- 30 May 1919: Following the Orts-Milner Convention, Ruanda and Burundi remains under Belgian administration.
- 1920s: Awsa is annexed to Ethiopia, but the monarchy remains.
- 10 January 1920: The Kionga Triangle is ceded from Tanganyika to Moçambique.
- 23 July 1920: The British East Africa Protectorate becomes the Kenya Colony and Protectorate.
- September 1921: The Kingdom of Bushiru is independent of Ruanda.
- 20 July 1922: Burundi and Rwanda are under a Belgian mandate from the League of Nations under the name Ruanda-Urundi. Tanganyika is under a British mandate from the League of Nations.
- 21 September 1923: Changamire is annexed to Southern Rhodesia.
- 1924: The Kingdom of Buhoma is annexed to Ruanda-Urundi.
- 1 May 1924: Rhodesia is dissolved into the protectorate of Northern Rhodesia and the colony of Southern Rhodesia.
- 15 July 1924: Britain cedes Jubaland, part of Kenya, to Italy.
- 1925: The Kingdom of Bushiru is annexed to Ruanda-Urundi, but the monarchy remains.
- October 1925: Hobyo is annexed to Italian Somaliland.
- 1926: Monarchy is abolished in Wanga.
- 1 March 1926: Ruanda-Urundi is a dependency of the Belgian Congo.
- 1 July 1926: Jubaland is annexed to Italian Somaliland.
- 1927: Majerteen is annexed to Italian Somaliland.
- 1931: The Kingdoms of Bukonya, Kibari and Rwankeri are annexed to Ruanda-Urundi.
- 1932: Kingdom of Jimma is annexed to Ethiopia.
- 15 January 1935: Foundation of the Italian East Africa from the union of Eritrea and Italian Somaliland.
- 3 October 1935: Italian invasion of Ethiopia (First Italo-Abyssinian War).
- 9 May 1936: Addis Ababa is occupied by Fascist Italy (Second Italo-Abyssinian War).
- 1 June 1936: Ethiopia is added to Italian East Africa, now divided in six provinces: Addis Ababa, Amhara, Eritrea, Galla-Sidamo, Harar and Somalia.
- August 1938: Monarchy is abolished in the Kingdom of Bushiru.
- 1 January 1939: The province of Scioa is created in Italian East Africa from Addis Ababa and parts of Amhara and Galla-Sidamo.
- 19 August 1940: Italian occupation of British Somaliland until 16 March 1941.
- February 1941: British occupation of Italian Somaliland until 21 November 1949.
- March 1941: British occupation of Ogaden in Ethiopia until 23 September 1948.
- 5 May 1941: British occupation of Eritrea.
- 27 November 1941: Ethiopia is completely liberated by the Allies and Arbegnoch.
- 1942: British occupation of Réunion, until 1946.
- 5 May 1942: Haile Selassie returns to Addis Ababa from exile, exactly 5 years after having fled from it.
- 5 May 1942: British occupation of Madagascar, until 13 October 1946.
- 2 July 1942: British occupation of Mayotte, until 1946.
- 25 September 1942: British occupation of Comoros.
- December 1942: British occupation of French Somaliland.

== Autonomy ==
- 19 March 1946: Réunion becomes an overseas département of France.
- 13 October 1946: End of the British occupation of Comoros.
- 27 October 1946: Comoros, Madagascar and French Somaliland become overseas territories of France.
- 11 December 1946: Tanganyika is under a British trust territory mandate from the United Nations.
- 13 December 1946: Ruanda-Urundi is under a Belgian trust territory mandate from the United Nations.
- 1 April 1950: Italian Somalilant is under an Italian trust territory mandate from the United Nations.
- 19 February 1951: Eritrea is under a British trust territory mandate from the United Nations.
- 11 June 1951: Moçambique becomes an overseas province.
- 15 September 1952: Eritrea federated with Ethiopia as an autonomous State.
- 1 August 1953: Northern Rhodesia, Nyasaland and Southern Rhodesia are parts of the Federation of Rhodesia and Nyasaland, until 31 December 1963.
- 1955: The Kingdom of Chako is annexed to Ethiopia.
- 14 October 1958: Madagascar gains autonomy from France under the name Malagasy Republic.
- 20 June 1960: Ruanda-Urundi is separated from the Belgian Congo.
- 26 June 1960: Madagascar proclaims independence from France. British Somaliland proclaims independence from the United Kingdom under the name State of Somaliland.
- 1 July 1960: Creation of the Somali Republic by the unification of the State of Somaliland with the Italian Somaliland.
- 18 October 1960: Rwanda gains autonomy from Belgium, then becomes the Rwandan Republic from 28 January 1961.
- 31 December 1960: Buganda proclaims independence from the United Kingdom.
- 1 May 1961: Tanganyika gains autonomy from the United Kingdom, then proclaims independence on 9 December.
- 21 December 1961: Burundi gains autonomy from Belgium.
- 22 December 1961: Comoros gains autonomy from France under the name State of Comoros.
- 1 March 1962: Uganda gains autonomy from the United Kingdom.

== Independence ==
- 1 July 1962: Burundi (as the Kingdom of Burundi) and the Rwandan Republic proclaim their independence from Belgium.
- 9 October 1962: Uganda proclaims independence from the United Kingdom, taking back Buganda in the process, and becomes the Republic of Uganda from 9 October 1963.
- 14 November 1962: Autonomy of Eritrea is dissolved by Eritrean parliament (with possible interference by the Emperor of Ethiopia).
- 9 December 1962: Tanganyika is renamed Republic of Tanganyika, while the traditional monarchies of the countries are abolished, except for the Kingdom of Shambalai.
- 13 February 1963: The Kingdom of Rwenzururu proclaims independence from Tooro as an autonomous part of Uganda.
- 9 May 1963: Nyasaland gains autonomy from the United Kingdom, followed by Kenya on 1 June and Zanzibar on 24 June.
- 10 December 1963: The Sultanate of Zanzibar proclaims independence from the United Kingdom, followed by Kenya on 12 December.
- 12 January 1964: The Sultanate of Zanzibar is renamed People's Republic of Zanzibar and Pemba.
- 18 January 1964: Pemba People's Republic proclaims independence from Zanzibar and Pemba, with reintegration before the end of the month.
- 22 January 1964: Northern Rhodesia gains autonomy from the United Kingdom.
- 27 April 1964: Creation of the United Republic of Tanganyika and Zanzibar from the union of the Republic of Tanganyika and the People's Republic of Zanzibar and Pemba. Its name changes to United Republic of Tanzania on 29 October.
- 6 July 1964: Nyasaland proclaims independence from the United Kingdom, under the name Malawi.
- 24 October 1964: Northern Rhodesia proclaims independence from the United Kingdom, under the name Republic of Zambia, but local monarchies are recognized until October 1969. Southern Rhodesia changes its name to Rhodesia.
- 12 December 1964: The monarchy is abolished in Kenya and it is known as the Republic of Kenya.
- 11 November 1965: Rhodesia proclaims independence from the United Kingdom, renamed Republic of Rhodesia from 2 March 1970, then Zimbabwe Rhodesia on 1 June 1979.
- 24 May 1966: Monarchy is abolished in Buganda, then in Ankole, Bunyoro-Kitara and Tooro from 8 September 1967.
- 6 July 1966: The monarchy is abolished in Malawi and it is known as the Republic of Malawi.
- 28 November 1966: The Kingdom of Burundi becomes the Republic of Burundi.
- 5 July 1967: French Somaliland becomes the French Territory of Afars and Issas.
- 12 March 1968: Mauritius proclaims independence from the United Kingdom.
- 21 October 1969: The Somali Republic becomes the Somali Democratic Republic.
- 12 November 1970: Seychelles gains autonomy from the United Kingdom.
- 1 May 1972: The Republic of Martyazo is proclaimed by Hutu rebels in Burundi.
- 9 May 1972: Burundi puts an end to the secession of Martyazo.
- 12 September 1974: The Emperor of Ethiopia is overthrown and Ethiopia, resulting in a 17-year-long civil war.
- 20 September 1974: Moçambique gains autonomy from Portugal.
- 21 March 1975: The monarchy is abolished in Ethiopia and is ruled by a military junta called the Derg.
- 2 June 1975: The monarchy is abolished in Awsa, Ethiopia.
- 25 June 1975: Moçambique proclaims independence from Portugal under the name People's Republic of Mozambique, a civil war goes from March 1976 to 9 October 1992.
- 6 July 1975: Comoros proclaims independence from France, recognized 31 December 1975, while Mayotte remains a French territory following a 22 December 1974 referendum.
- 30 December 1975: The Malagasy Republic becomes the Democratic Republic of Madagascar.
- 29 June 1976: Seychelles proclaims independence from the United Kingdom as the Republic of Seychelles.
- 24 December 1976: Mayotte becomes a collectivité territoriale
- 27 June 1977: The French Territory of Afars and Issas proclaims independence from France under the name Republic of Djibouti.
- 24 May 1978: The State of Comoros becomes the Federal and Islamic Republic of Comoros.
- 11 April 1979: Tanzanian occupation of Uganda until 1 July 1981.
- 12 December 1979: Zimbabwe Rhodesia renounces to its independence to become a colony of the United Kingdom.
- 17 April 1980: Zimbabwe proclaims independence from the United Kingdom, renamed Republic of Zimbabwe from 17 April 1991.

== Contemporary history ==
- 10 September 1987: Ethiopia becomes the People's Democratic Republic of Ethiopia.
- 1 December 1990: The People's Republic of Mozamnbique is now known as Republic of Mozambique.
- 18 May 1991: Somaliland proclaims independence from the Somali Democratic Republic.
- 27 May 1991: The People's Democratic Republic of Ethiopia is simply known as Ethiopia with the overthrow of the Derg.
- 21 July 1991: The Somali Democratic Republic becomes the Somali Republic.
- 12 March 1992: The monarchy is abolished in Mauritius and it is known as Republic of Mauritius.
- 12 September 1992: The Democratic Republic of Madagascar becomes the Republic of Madagascar.
- 24 May 1993: Eritrea proclaims independence from Ethiopia.
- 24 July 1993: The autonomous Kingdoms of Buganda, Bunyoro-Kitara and Tooro are created inside the Republic of Uganda.
- 20 November 1993: Proclamation of the autonomous Kingdom of Ankole, inside the Republic of Uganda.
- 22 August 1995: Ethiopia becomes the Federal Democratic Republic of Ethiopia. Nine autonomous regions and two chartered cities were created: Afar Region, Amhara Region, Benishangul-Gumuz Region, Gambela Region, Harari Region, Oromia Region, Somali Region, Southern Nations, Nationalities, and People's Region, Tigray Region, Addis Ababa and Dire Dawa.
- 3 August 1997: Anjouan proclaims independence from Comoros, endorsed by a referendum 26 October 1997.
- 11 August 1997: Mohéli proclaims independence from Comoros, ending in 1998.
- 23 July 1998: Proclamation of the autonomous Puntland State inside the Somali Republic, followed by the State of Jubaland on 3 September 1998.
- 11 July 2001: Mayotte becomes a collectivité départementale.
- 23 December 2001: The Federal and Islamic Republic of Comoros becomes the Union of Comoros, following a constitutional referendum. On 10 March 2002 Anjouan ends its secession and becomes, with Mohéli, autonomous regions, followed by Grande Comore on 7 April.
- 1 April 2002: Proclamation of the autonomous State of Southwestern Somalia inside the Somali Republic.
- 30 April 2002: The province of Antsiranana proclaims independence from Madagascar under the name Confederation of Madagascar (until 1 July), followed by Toamasina from 1 May to 5 July, Toliara from 2 May to 14 June, Mahajanga from 3 May to 13 June.
- 12 October 2002: Rodrigues becomes an autonomous part of Mauritius.
- 5 June 2003: The Rwandan Republic becomes the Republic of Rwanda.
- 14 August 2006: Proclamation of the autonomous State of Galmudug inside the Somali Republic.
