= Busoga Masaza Cup =

Ugandan football tournament

- Organising body: Busoga Kingdom
- Founded: 2016
- Country: Uganda
- Kingdom: Busoga
- Leagues: Busoga Masaza Cup
- Number of clubs: 14
- Current champions: Busiki (2023)
- Current Shield: Busoga Masaza Cup (2023)
- Most championships: Kigulu | Butembe | Busiki
- Top scorer: Sharif Samanya Amuke
- Broadcaster(s): Baba TV
- Website: Busoga Kingdom

The Busoga Masaza Cup is an annual football tournament in Uganda that was revived in 2016 by

His royal highness Kyabazinga Gabula Nadiope IV.

The Masaza tournament is organised by the ministry of sports, Busoga Kingdom.

Up to 14 teams from the 11 chiefdoms that make Busoga Kingdom participate in the Masaza Cup Tournament. These include; Bugabula, Butembe, Budiope, Bugweri, Kigulu, Luuka, Bulamogi, Bukono, Bunha, Bunhole Bunhanhumba, Bukooli Bugiri, Bukooli Namayingo, Buzaaya, and Busiki.

The first edition of this tournament was played in 2016. The finals were held in Kyabazinga stadium Bugembe. In attendance was HRH Kyabazinga Gabula Nadiope, and FUFA president Moses Magogo. This was followed by a second round in 2017.

Kigulu won the tournament twice.

The tournament attracted sponsors including City Tyres, MTN, Baba TV, Baba FM, Mayuge Sugar, and Nile special.

Due to the impacts of COVID-19, the Masaza Cup Tournament was interrupted until 2022.

The finals of the 5th edition were held on 17 September 2022 at Kyabazinga Stadium Bugembe

Bukhooli-Namayingo FC won the 2022 Busoga Cup 1–0 against Kigulu FC.

The 2023 Masaza cup tournament was launched on 5 August 2023 at the Kingdom headquarters in Jinja and this will see the winners walk away with a cash prize of UGX 12 million with much emphasis on youth soccer development

Busiki and Butembe reached the finals of the 2023 Busoga Masaza Cup tournament which Busiki won

== Winners ==
- 2016 Bukooli North won Bunha 3-1
- 2017 Butembe beat Bunha 4–3 on penalties after the normal play ended 1-1
- 2018 Kigulu won Butembe on penalties 5-4 following a goalless draw
- 2019 Kigulu won Bunha 1-0
- 2022 Bukooli Namayingo won Kigulu 1-0
- 2023 Busiki won Butembe 1-0
- 2024 Butembe won Bukono 1-0

== See also ==
- Busoga Kingdom
- Uganda Premier League
