= Bukono Principality =

Chiefdom in Uganda

Principality of Bukono
- Status: Traditional chiefdom
- Government: Traditional monarchy
  - Chief: Nkono

Part of Busoga Kingdom (1 of 11 chiefdoms)
  - Founded: Historical period
  - British protectorate: 19th century

The Principality of Bukono is one of the eleven traditional chiefdoms of the Busoga Kingdom in Uganda. The chiefdom is ruled by a chief holding the title Nkono, and represents one of the five chiefdoms whose rulers migrated into Busoga from Bunyoro Kingdom.

== Historical origins ==
Bukono is one of five chiefdoms whose rulers migrated into Busoga from Bunyoro Kingdom. The five chiefs who migrated from Bunyoro held the titles: Zibondo of Bulamogi, Gabula of Bugabula, Ngobi of Kigulu, Tabingwa of Luuka, and Nkono of Bukono. These chiefdoms were established alongside other tribal chiefs including Wakooli of Bukooli, Ntembe of Butembe, Menha of Bugweri, Kisiki of Busiki, Luba of Bunha, and Nanhumba of Bunhole, forming the complete structure of eleven chiefdoms that comprise Busoga Kingdom.

It was founded before 1656 and became a part of the British protectorate in Busoga in 1896. Its ruler is known as the Nkono.

== Traditional Governance ==
Until the 19th century, Busoga was divided into independent chiefdoms ruled by their respective chiefs. The chiefs often engaged in conflicts amongst themselves, and these fights were frequently influenced by the neighboring kingdoms of Bunyoro and Buganda, which often supplied arms and armies to different factions.

== Modern structure ==
The Bukono Kingdom operates within the framework of the restored Busoga Kingdom, which was reestablished as a cultural institution following Uganda's constitutional provisions for traditional monarchies. The Obwa Kyabazinga bwa Busoga has historically served as a broker of socioeconomic transformation, rallying the people of the sub-region to use their rich cultural heritage to improve their wellbeing.

== See also ==
- Busoga Kingdom
- Bunyoro Kingdom
- Traditional kingdoms of Uganda
- Obwa Kyabazinga
