= Buzaaya =

Busoga chiefdom

Buzaaya Eisaaza lya Buzaaya
- Former Chiefdom and Current County
- Location in Kamuli District, Eastern Uganda
- Country: Uganda
- Region: Eastern Region
- District: Kamuli District
- Chiefdom established: c. 1720
- Incorporated into Busoga Kingdom: 1906

Government
  - Type: Formerly hereditary chiefdom
- Time zone: UTC+3 (EAT)

Buzaaya was an ancient Basoga chiefdom in what is now Kamuli District, Eastern Uganda. It was established c. 1720 and was an independent polity within the Kingdom of Busoga. Buzaaya was annexed by British protectorate of Busoga in 1906, ending its royal dynasty as part of the colonial unification of the Kingdom of Busoga.

Today, Buzaaya is a county administrative council in Kamuli District, represented by members in Parliament in Uganda.

== History and establishment ==
Buzaaya is among the pre-colonial chiefdoms of Busoga, a region historically composed of several autonomous polities governed by hereditary chiefs. Prior to colonial rule, the chief of Buzaaya exercised authority over land allocation, justice, and ritual leadership.

During the late 19th century, the region came under British colonial administration and was incorporated into the Uganda Protectorate. The British adopted a system of indirect rule, recognizing existing Busoga chiefdoms, including Buzaaya, and later organizing them into the Busoga Confederacy in 1914.

The confederacy later evolved into the modern Busoga Kingdom, headed by the Kyabazinga of Busoga. Buzaaya retained its status as one of the constituent chiefdoms. Buzaaya was one of the several hereditary chiefdoms among the Basoga people, which were said to have been founded in 1720. It had a monarchical traditional system of government, but in 1906, under British colonial restructuring, Buzaaya and other chiefdoms were merged into the Busoga Kingdom, with the Kyabazinga (paramount king) system of rule. This move led to the dissolution of Buzaaya's royal line, as colonial authorities streamlined administration.

== Modern administrative status ==
In modern Ugandan political geography, Buzaaya is a Kamuli District county of the Busoga sub-region. It is both a parliamentary constituency and a source of local administration and national parliamentarian.

From 1996 to 2011, Isaac Musumba served as the elected Member of Parliament (MP) for Buzaaya County in Kamuli District. As of the most recent elections, Buzaaya County is represented by Mugabi Muzaale Martin Kisule, a member of the National Resistance Movement (NRM) in the Parliament of Uganda.

== People and culture ==
The inhabitants of Buzaaya are predominantly Basoga and speak Lusoga, a Bantu language. Social organization traditionally follows clan lineages, which play an important role in marriage, inheritance, and cultural identity.

Cultural life in Buzaaya reflects broader Busoga traditions, including music, dance, storytelling, and respect for ancestral heritage. While indigenous religious practices were historically significant, Christianity and Islam are now the dominant religions.

== Location ==
Buzaaya is located in Kamuli District.

== See also ==
- Busiki
- Chiefdom of Bunya
- Kyabazinga of Busoga
- Buyende District
- Soga people
- Bukwanga Kiki
