= Male Mabirizi =

Ugandan lawyer and advocate

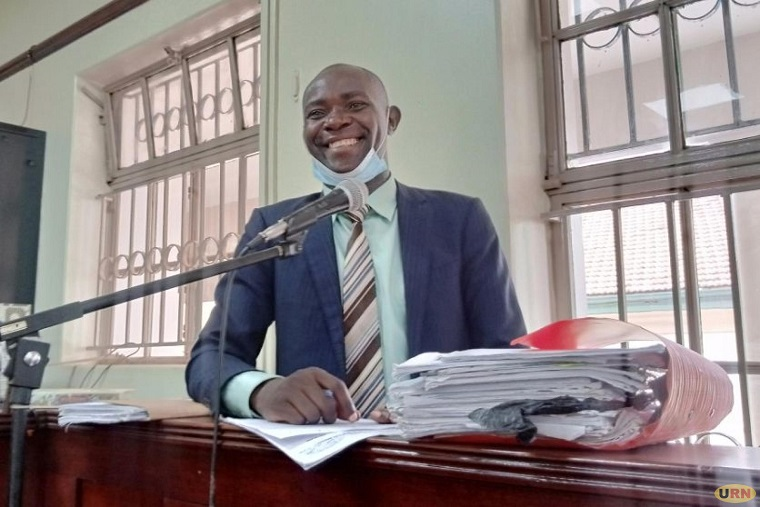
- Born: 1987 (age 38–39); Lugazi
- Citizenship: Ugandan
- Education: Makerere University
- Occupations: Lawyer and Businessman
- Father: Mohammed Mutumba

Male Mabirizi is a Ugandan lawyer and advocate.

== Early life ==
Mabirizi was born in Lugazi in 1987 to Mohammad Mutumba, and his mother was Ndwaddewazzibwa Mastula. He studied primary school at Nkokonjeru Muslim. He went to Crane High Secondary School for an "Ordinary" level, and to Kawempe Muslim School for an "Advanced" level. He pursued a bachelor of Law from Makerere University.

== Notable lawsuits ==
Male Mabirizi filed for an arrest of Aloysius Bugingo at the chief magistrate court of Entebbe court, his second wife Susan Makula Nantaba, and his escorts who attended his customary marriage ceremony with allegations that he was still legally married to his former wife Teddy Bujjingo with whom he has four children and his marriage to another woman was illegal, an abomination, and an act of bigamy that amounts to five years of imprisonment.

Male in November 2023 dragged Nadiope, the Busoga King to the Grade one magistrate court in Jinja over his marriage with Jovia Mutesi over allegations that his marriage to the wife was illegal alleging that the king had previously married a woman called Alison Anna in December 2016 in England on contract. He, however, lost the court case.

In 2017, Mabirizi sued the Kabaka of Buganda, Ronald Muwenda Mutebi in the Ugandan constitutional court on allegations that he took Mailo land in Buganda through mass stellers' registration in his name, and collected ground rent. In 2022, he reignited the court case against the Kabaka and the Buganda Land Board when he submitted a petition seeking to block the Kabaka from conducting an activity where he instructed all Mailo land owners to register their land ownership names in the name, and collected 10% from the sales Mailo land by the owners.

Male Mabirizi in 2018 was denied a petition against the Ugandan constitutional court's move to uphold the age limit amendment bill which indicated minimum and maximum term limits for politicians. However, his petition was denied.

He challenged the documents of Robert Kyagulanyi Ssentamu aka Bobi Wine including his national Identification, passport, and academic documents when he wrote to the Ugandan Electoral Commission to verify from different significant sources his credentials ahead of his contest for Ugandan president in 2021. According to section 4 (3) (c) of the Parliamentary Elections Act, 2005, a person's qualification to be a Ugandan parliamentarian is based on A-level education as the minimum education level, thus Mabirizi wanted to confirm that Bobi Wine qualifies. In June 2021, he again ordered for Rober Kyagulanyi to answer a case on the submission of false documents about his registration at Makerere University.

== Arrest ==
Mabirizi was arrested in February 2022 by a Ugandan court Judge Musa Ssekaana of the Ugandan High Court Civil Division on his social media of being biased and not competent enough to handle just a mere family court case and not qualified for any national award related to his position as a judge. This led to his sentence to Luzira Maximum Security Prison in Uganda for 18 months.

== See also ==
- Peter James Nkambo Mugerwa
