= Bukooli Chiefdom =

Chiefdom in Uganda

- Status: Traditional chiefdom
- Government: Traditional monarchy
  - Chief: Wakooli

Part of Busoga Kingdom (1 of 11 chiefdoms)
  - Founded: Historical period
  - British protectorate: 1891

Bukooli Chiefdom is one of the eleven traditional chiefdoms of the Busoga Kingdom in Eastern Uganda. The chiefdom is ruled by a chief holding the title Wakooli, representing one of the indigenous tribal leadership structures within the Busoga cultural and political system. It forms part of the cultural and administrative structure of the Obwa Kyabazinga Bwa Busoga, a constitutional monarchy recognized under Article 246(1) of the Constitution of Uganda. The chiefdom is centered in the Bugiri and Namayingo Districts, with its historical and cultural significance deeply rooted in the traditions of the Basoga people.

== Traditional leadership ==
The traditional ruler of Bukooli holds the title of Chief Wakooli, which serves as both the name and title given to the chief of the chiefdom, passed down within the Abaisewakooli clan. Wakooli is listed among the tribal chiefs alongside other traditional leaders including Ntembe of Butembe, Menha of Bugweri, Kisiki of Busiki, Luba of Bunha, and Nanhumba of Bunhole.

The chief plays a cultural and ceremonial role, promoting Basoga traditions and community development. Bukooli operates under the broader governance of the Busoga Kingdom, which is led by the Isebantu Kyabazinga and supported by a Prime Minister and the Lukiiko. The chiefdom collaborates with district authorities in Bugiri and Namayingo, where elected chairpersons and mayors oversee administrative functions.

== History ==
It was founded before 1737 and became a part of the British protectorate in Busoga in 1891. Its ruler is known as Chief Wakooli and the same name/tile is given to the chief of the Abaisewakooli clan. According to oral tradition, the chiefdom was founded by Okali, the first son of Mukama, a prince from Bunyoro. Okali’s leadership led to the establishment of Bukooli under the title of Chief Wakooli, who also serves as the head of the Abaisewakooli clan. Unlike the five chiefs who migrated into Busoga from Bunyoro Kingdom (Zibondo of Bulamogi, Gabula of Bugabula, Ngobi of Kigulu, Tabingwa of Luuka, and Nkono of Bukono), Wakooli represents one of the indigenous tribal leadership structures that existed within the Busoga region.

The name "Bukooli" is believed to derive from the Luganda word "kukoola," which means "to clear land" or "to cultivate," perhaps reflecting the early agricultural practices of its inhabitants or the process of establishing the chiefdom in previously unsettled areas.

=== Colonial period ===
Bukooli became part of the British Protectorate in Busoga in 1891, during the broader colonial consolidation of the region. The British reorganized Busoga’s semi-autonomous chiefdoms into a federated structure under a Lukiiko (parliament) in 1906, with Bukooli remaining a key administrative unit. The colonial administration introduced cash crops like cotton and coffee, which transformed Bukooli’s economy, alongside the imposition of a poll tax to finance local governance.

=== Post-independence and modern era ===
After Uganda’s independence in 1962, Bukooli continued as a cultural institution within the Busoga Kingdom. The monarchy was abolished in 1966 under President Milton Obote but was restored in 1995 by the National Resistance Movement government. Bukooli’s role as a chiefdom was reaffirmed, with its chief, Wakooli, participating in the election of the Kyabazinga, the supreme cultural leader of Busoga. The current Kyabazinga, William Kadhumbula Gabula Nadiope IV, was crowned in 2014, supported by ten of the eleven Busoga chiefs, including the Chief Wakooli.

In recent years, Bukooli has faced socioeconomic challenges, including high rates of teenage pregnancy in Namayingo District (26% as of 2024), attributed to poverty and cultural practices. The chiefdom’s leadership has advocated for community-based solutions to address these issues, such as improved access to sexual and reproductive health services.

== See also ==
- Busoga Kingdom
- Obwa Kyabazinga
- Traditional kingdoms of Uganda
- Basoga people
