= Kigulu =

Traditional principality in Uganda

Kigulu is one of the five traditional principalities of the kingdom of Busoga in Uganda. It is located in the Iganga District.

It was founded around 1737 and became a part of the British protectorate in Busoga in 1896. Its ruler is known as the Ngobi. From 1809 to 1899, part of its territory was independent as the chiefdom of Kigulu-Buzimba.

== Administrative structure ==
The area is divided into two main political constituencies in Inganga:

- Kigulu North comprises the sub-counties of Nawandala, Nabitende, Nambale and Namugalwe.
- Kigulu South comprises Bulamogi, Nakigo, Nawaningi and Nakalama.

== Key institutions and sports ==
Kigulu Cultural Museum is located in Iganga. This community museum is housed in the former residence of the chief of Kigulu. It preserves Busoga heritage through artifacts, traditional medicines and historical literature.

Kigulu College is a prominent government aided mixed secondary school in Namugale, hosting over 2,500 students as of 2024.

Kigulu FC is a football team representing the county in Busoga Masaza cup. It won the eighth edition of the MTN-Busoga Masaza cup, defeating Luuka 1-0 in a closely contested final at Kyabazinga stadium, Bugembe.

== See also ==
- Busiki
- William Gabula
- Busoga Kingdom
- Iganga District
