= John Teira =

Ugandan lawyer and politician (born 1980)

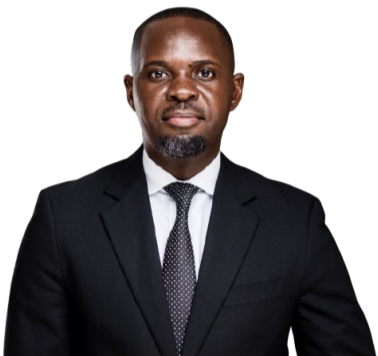
- Born: John Teira; September 26, 1980 (age 45); Namaira, Balawoli subcounty, Bugabula North county / constituency Kamuli District, Busoga, Sub-region Eastern Region, Uganda
- Occupation: Lawyer
- Known for: Deputy Chairperson Legal and Parliamentary Affairs Parliament of Uganda; Member of Parliament (May 2021 to date) - Bugabula North County
- Title: Partner at Cristal Advocates
- Spouse: samalie nakimbugwe bajunga
- Children: 4
- Website: johnteira.com

John Teira (born September 26, 1980) is a Ugandan lawyer and legislator, currently serving as the Member of Parliament for Bugabula North County under the National Resistance Movement (NRM) since May 2021. In addition to his parliamentary duties, he holds the position of Deputy Chairperson of the Legal and Parliamentary Affairs Committee at the Parliament of Uganda.
