= Kigulu-Buzimba =

Former chiefdom in present-day Uganda

Kigulu-Buzimba (or Buzimba-Kigulu) was a Basoga chiefdom in pre-colonial Uganda. Power in Kigulu-Buzimba largely was held by the maternal kin of the rulers. It was split off from the principality of Kigulu in 1806 and reunited with it in 1899, under British colonial rule.
