= Walukuba Estate =

Walukuba Estate is a low-income housing estate in Walukuba-Masese Division, Jinja Municipality, in Jinja District, Uganda. It was constructed in the 1940s and 1950s by the British colonial government to house African workers. It was the largest housing estate in East Africa at the time of its completion in 1956.

== History ==
As Jinja town expanded in the 1920s and 1930s, the colonial authorities increasingly saw the need for organised housing quarters for the increasing number of African labour. The lack of planned housing for the native workers had seen many of them setting up huts in the town, which were seen as undesirable by the town's colonial administrators. The huts were also unplanned additions to the town.

The philosophy behind the estate's construction, in addition to taking African settlements away from proximity to European quarters, was to orient Africans to western-style housing and planned settlements - which the colonial administrators saw as "modernity".

In the 1950s, as it was still being constructed, Walukuba was - together with the Naguru/Nakawa Housing Estates in Kampala - one of the two largest housing estates for Africans/native Ugandans. Uganda at the time was still a British protectorate.

The estate was divided into two parts: Walukuba West and Walukuba East, which were separated by a marshy valley. Walukuba West was constructed first, consisting of blocks of mainly single-room and a few two-room houses for low-income renters. Walukuba East, on the other hand, catered to high-income Africans with its larger, self-contained houses.

At the time of its completion in 1956, the estate comprised approximately 1,600 housing units and was the largest housing estate in East Africa. It was home to thousands of workers in Jinja's industries as well as employees of the Jinja Municipal Council. The workers were drawn from across the country and, at one point, the local Basoga and neighbouring Baganda people shunned the estate and preferred to live in outlying villages.

== Walukuba Estate today ==
Walukuba did not escape the depredation of Uganda's military regimes and instability in the 1970s and 1980s. The lack of effective government and a failed economy had a big impact of the estate's residents and overall condition. Most of the residents had been employed in nearby factories, most of which closed in the 1970s and 1980s, triggered by Idi Amin's expulsion of Asians from Uganda. The closure of the factories saw most of the estate's residents losing their jobs.

Although the current government - which came to power in 1986 - brought stability and a gradual return to economic growth, it did little to reverse the crumbling of the estate. Liberalisation policies followed at the behest of the World Bank and the IMF, as well as the decentralisation mode of governance instituted by the government, meant there was never enough revenue to improve structures in the estate. Political leaders were also unwilling to raise the low rents or pursue back rates owed by tenants in the estate. The division council was reluctant to enforce regulations that governed the estate - such as a ban on sub-letting and brewing of alcohol.

In 2007, the Jinja Municipal Council authorised the privatisation of the estate. Sitting tenants were given the option of buying their house-plots on 49-year leases. The rationale of the privatisation was that the tenants were in a better position of renovating the houses or demolishing them and constructing new structures. Today, most of the plots in the estate have been sold off to the tenants, many of whom have constructed new houses. Several of the older structures still stand, however.

The estate is home to about 17,000 people drawn from across Uganda. Many of the residents are employed in factories, while others are in the informal sector.
