= Margaret Mbeiza Kisira =

Ugandan politician

- Born: Kaliro District; 18 November 1973 (age 52)
- Citizenship: Ugandan
- Education: Kaliro Church of Uganda Primary School, Wanyange Girls Secondary SchoolBudini Secondary school, Nkumba university,
- Occupation: Politician
- Years active: 2005– Present
- Political party: National Resistance Movement

Margaret Mbeiza Kisira (born 18 November 1973) is a Ugandan hotelier, politician and legislator. She is the district woman representative for Kaliro District in the parliament of Uganda. She is a member of the National Resistance Movement(NRM) the party in political leadership in Uganda under the chairmanship of Yoweri Kaguta Museveni president of the republic of Uganda. She was appointed as a state minister for Economic monitoring in 2009 by President museveni her appointment was blocked by the parliament of Uganda.

== Early life and education ==
Margaret Mbeiza was born on 18 November 1973. She started her primary education at Kaliro Church of Uganda Primary School, where she sat for her primary leaving examinations (PLE) in 1987, she later joined Wanyange Girls Secondary School for her O-level education, and she sat her Uganda Certificate of Education (UCE) examinations in 1991; thereafter, she enrolled at Budoni Secondary School for her A-level education and sat her Uganda Advanced Certificate of Education (UACE) in 1998. She later joined Nkumba University, where she graduated with a bachelor's degree of science in tourism.

== Career ==
Margaret Mbeiza worked under the office of the president as resident district commissioner(RDC) of Mayuge District from 2012 to 2015, she served as Kaliro District woman member of parliament between 2006 and 2011, she also served as speaker for Kamuli District local government between 2001 and 2005. She is Ccrrently the woman member of parliament for Kaliro District from 2016 to date. In parliament she serves on the committee on physical infrastructure.

== Personal life ==
Margaret is unmarried and, in her personal time, enjoys listening to music as well as maintaining her health and fitness.

== See also ==
- Parliament of Uganda
- National Resistance Movement
- Kaliro District
- Frederick Ngobi Gume
- Kenneth Lubogo
- List of members of the tenth Parliament of Uganda
