= Yosia Nadiope of Busoga =

Yosia Nadiope was a past Kyabazinga of Busoga, Uganda. Nadiope died in an accident in Iganda town on 9th July 2018.

== Historical role and education ==
- Education Advocate: Yosia Nadiope is often referred to as the "father of modern education" in Busoga. In 1911, he donated land to missionaries to establish the Balangira School, a school intended for royal education that later evolved into the prestigious Busoga College Mwiri.
- Political Grooming: Following British colonial efforts to unify Busoga's semi-autonomous chiefdoms into a single federation, Yosia Nadiope was selected as the ideal candidate for the first permanent ruler due to his noble lineage and education.
- Educational Background: He was among the first group of Basoga students to attend King's College Budo in 1906. Note: In 2018, another royal family member also named Yosia Nadiope (a brother to the current Kyabazinga) died in a tragic road accident in Iganga. Historical references to the "Paramount Chief" or "Father of Education" specifically refer to the earlier 20th-century leader.

== See also ==
- Ezekiel Tenywa Wako of Busoga
