= Luuka District =

- District
- District location in Uganda
- Coordinates: 00°42′N 33°18′E
- Country: Uganda
- Region: Eastern Uganda
- Sub-region: Busoga sub-region
- Established: 1 July 2010
- Capital: Luuka

Area
  - Land: 650.1 km^{2} (251.0 sq mi)
- Elevation: 1,200 m (3,900 ft)

Population (2012 Estimate)
  - Total: 260,900
  - Density: 401.3/km^{2} (1,039/sq mi)
- Time zone: UTC+3 (EAT)
- Website: www.luuka.go.ug

Luuka District is a district in Eastern Uganda.

== Administration ==
Luuka is also an administrative center with two count and they include Luuka North County and Luuka South county. Luuka North County is also further divided into smaller administrative units forexample sub county and parish.

- Bukooma
- Bukooma Town council
- Bulongo
- Ikumbya
- Luuka town Council

Luuka South county is an administrative county in luuka district and it has several sub county as listed below.

- Bukanga
- Bulanga Town Council
- Busalamu Town Council
- Irongo
- Kyanvuma
- Nawampiti
- Waibuga

== Location ==
Luuka District is bordered by Buyende District in the north, Kaliro District to the northeast, Iganga District to the southeast, Mayuge District to the south, Jinja District to the southwest and Kamuli District to the northwest. Luuka, where the district headquarters are located, is approximately 33 kilometres (21 mi), by road, northwest of Iganga, the nearest large town. The coordinates of the district are:00 42N, 33 18E.

== Overview ==
Luuka District was created by an Act of Parliament and became functional on 1 July 2010. Previously, the district was Luuka County in Iganga District. In Kisoga tradition, Luuka is one of the five traditional principalities of the Kingdom of Busoga. According to legend, Luuka was founded around 1737 A.D. and became a part of the British protectorate in Busoga in 1896 A.D. Its traditional ruler is known as the Tabingwa. The district is made up of the following sub-counties: (a) Bukanga (b) Bukooma (c) Bulongo (d) Ikumbya (e) Irongo (f) Nawampiti and (g) Waibuga.

== Population ==
In 1991, the national population census estimated the district population at about 130,400. The national census in 2002 estimated the district population to be approximately 185,500. In 2012, the district population was estimated at 260,900. , in 2014 the population was estimated at 238020 and in 2024 it was estimated at 298639.

== Economic activity ==
- Maize
- Retail and wholesale business
- cassava
- Boda boda business

== Livestocks ==
- Chicken
- goat
- Sheep
- cattle

== See also ==
- Luuka
- Busoga sub-region
- Districts of Uganda
- Eastern Region, Uganda
- Parliament of Uganda
- 2016 Ugandan general election
- 2021 Ugandan general election
- 2011 Ugandan general election
