= Frederick Ngobi Gume =

Ugandan politician

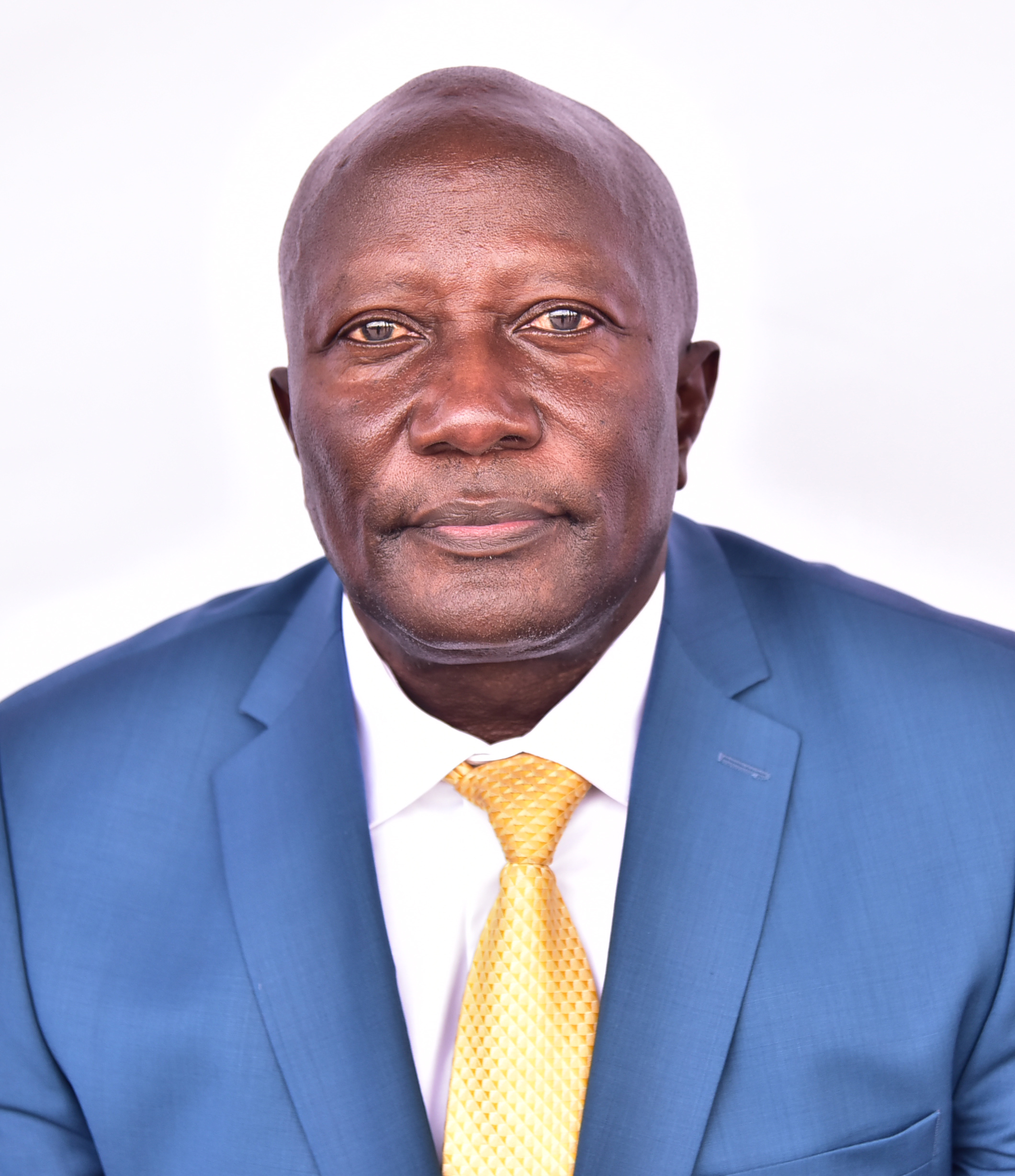
- Frederick Ngobi Gume

State Minister for Cooperatives
- In office 6 June 2016 – 2026
- President: Yoweri Museveni

Member of Parliament
- In office 2016–2026
- Constituency: Bulamogi North West County, Kaliro District

Personal details
- Born: Frederick Ngobi Gume Uganda
- Party: National Resistance Movement (NRM)
- Other political affiliations: Independent (contested 2026 elections)
- Occupation: Politician
- Profession: Legislator

Frederick Ngobi Gume, is a politician in Uganda. He is the former State Minister for Cooperatives in the Ugandan Cabinet. He was appointed to that position from 6th June 2016 to 2026.

After the 2026 general elections, he was also dropped from the cabinet of ministers for the term and was replaced with Alero Tom Aza who serves as Minister of State for Cooperatives in the cabinet of ministers.

In the January 2026 general elections, Ngobi lost the Bulamogi North West seat after he had lost the National Resistance Movement (NRM) primary elections and subsequently contested as an independent candidate but was defeated by the NRM candidate George Patrick Kasajja.

== Career ==
He served as the member of parliament representing Bulamogi North West Constituency, Kaliro District in the 10th Parliament (2016 - 2021). In 2021 he was reelected to the same position in the eleventh Parliament of Uganda . He served as an LC5 chairperson for Jinja district , and also was a human resource manager for Salini Construttori S.P.A during construction of the Bujagali Hydroelectric project. Gume has also served as the president of the Uganda Local Government Association (ULGA), East African Local Government Association (EALGA), African Local government Association (ALGA) and was also an executive member on the world Bureau of Leaders, all in the period between . Other notable roles were chairman Northcott Hall at Makerere University in the 1980's, Treasurer Mubende and Nebbi district, Town clerk Iganga district. He is also a large scale coffee farmer in Budondo, Jinja district. He has also played a pivotal role in Attracting foreign investors by inviting groups such as the All China Federation for Industry and Commerce (ACFIC), The Shunde Youth Business Enterprise as well as the Guangdong Federation of Industry and Commerce while promoting companies such as Chinastar Construction (Africa) Company Limited, a major steel fabrication factory who are now established in Seeta, Uganda.

== Political career ==
Gume lost his party ticket to Kasajja George Patrick for Bulamogi North West Constituency, Kaliro District during the NRM party primary elections in 2025.

== See also ==
- Cabinet of Uganda
- Parliament of Uganda
- David Karubanga
- Matia Kasaija
- Abdu Katuntu
