= Masego =

Masego is a Tswana/Pedi name (a Bantu tribe found in Botswana and South Africa) meaning blessings that may refer to:

- Masego (musician) (born 1993), modern hip hop artist who utilizes elements of jazz and house music
- Masego Kgomo (c. 1999–2009), murdered South African girl whose body parts were sold for rituals
- Masego Loate (born 1982), South African basketball player
- Maps Maponyane (born Masego Maponyane in 1990), South African television presenter, actor, fashion designer, speaker and model
- Masego Ntshingane (born 1978), Botswana football midfielder

== See also ==
- Maseko
