= Bukwanga Kiki =

18th-19th century Basoga chiefdom in Uganda

- c. 1737–Late 19th century
- Status: Chiefdom
- Common languages: Lusoga
- Religion: Traditional African religion
- Government: Traditional monarchy
- Chief
- Historical era: Pre-colonial East Africa
  - Established: c. 1737
  - Incorporation into British Uganda Protectorate: Late 19th century
- Today part of: Uganda

Bukwanga Kiki (also known as Bukwangakiki) was a Basoga chiefdom in what is today Uganda. It was founded around 1737 and lasted until the end of the 19th century, when it came under British rule.

== Background ==
Before the establishment of British colonial rule, the Busoga region consisted of several independent chiefdoms, each governed by a traditional ruler who exercised authority over land, justice, and cultural affairs. Bukwanga Kiki is mentioned in local historical narratives as one such leader operating within this system.

== Cultural significance ==
Figures such as Bukwanga Kiki are remembered primarily through oral tradition, which remains an important means of preserving Busoga history. Oral histories contribute to the understanding of lineage, leadership succession, and community identity among the Basoga people.

== See also ==
- Kyabazinga of Busoga
- Soga people
- Buzaaya
