= Buima =

Buima was a Basoga chiefdom in what is today Uganda. It was founded before 1818 and lasted until the end of the nineteenth century.
