= Ngobi =

Surname listed mostly evident in the basoga tribe of Uganda (Royals)

Ngobi is a surname. Notable people with the surname include:

- Frederick Ngobi Gume, Ugandan politician
- Terisa Ngobi, New Zealand politician

== See also ==
- Ngoni people
- Ngobin
