= Maseko =

Maseko is an African surname. Notable people with the surname include:

- Andries Maseko (1955–2013), South African footballer
- Gertrude Maseko, First Lady of Malawi
- Jevan Maseko (1943–2013), Zimbabwean military officer and government official
- Job Maseko (died 1952), South African soldier during World War II
- Lorna Maseko (born 1983), South African actress and media personality
- Robert Maseko(Born 1968), Congolese-British musicologist, singer-songwriter and Producer based in the UK.
- Owen Maseko (born in 1974 or 1975), Zimbabwean visual artist
- Sinegugu Maseko (born 1997), South African cricketer
- Thapelo Maseko (born 2003), South African footballer
- Themba Maseko (born 1961), South African politician
- Thulani Maseko, (born 1970) Swaziland human rights lawyer assassinated in 2023
- Zenokuhle Maseko,(born 1998) , South African Actress and internet personality
- Zola Maseko (born 1967), Swazi film director and screenwriter

== See also ==
- Maseko v Maseko, a 1990 case in South African contract law
- Masego
