= David Karubanga =

Ugandan politician

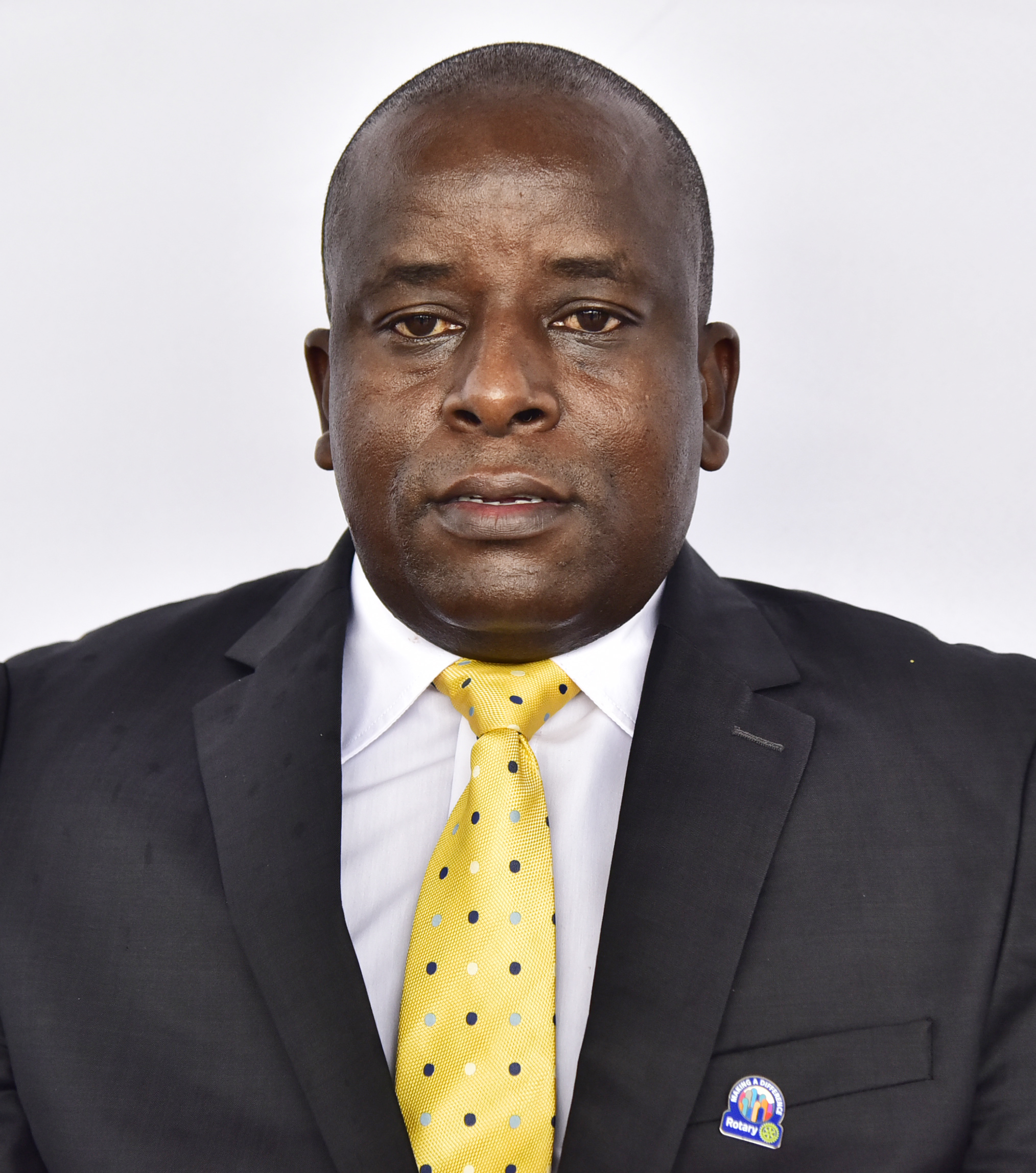
Karubanga David

David Karubanga is a Ugandan politician. He was the State Minister of Public Service in the Ugandan Cabinet from 2016 to 2021 when he was dropped in a cabinet reshuffle. He was appointed to that position on 6 June 2016. He was first elected to the parliament in 2016 representing the people of Kigorobya county under the NRM in the 10th parliament (2016-2021). He represented Kigorobya County Constituency in Hoima District in the 11th Ugandan Parliament (2021–2026).

In the 11th parliament, he served as the Chairperson of the Committee on Physical Infrastructure, and Parliament records also show him actively presenting reports of the Physical Infrastructure Committee, including reports concerning roads and the Ministry of Works and Transport.

In the 2026 elections, Karubanga contested for Kigorobya County as an independent candidate but lost to Dr. Gerald Kasigwa of the National Resistance Movement (NRM), who represents Kigorobya County, Hoima District, in the 12th Parliament (2026-2031).

== See also ==
- Cabinet of Uganda
- Parliament of Uganda
