= Luuka Town =

- Town
- Nickname: Kiyunga
- Map of Uganda showing the location of Luuka Town.
- Coordinates: 00°45′51″N 33°19′55″E
- Country: Uganda
- Region: Eastern Uganda
- Sub-region: Busoga sub-region
- District: Luuka District
- Elevation: 1,200 m (3,900 ft)
- Time zone: UTC+3 (EAT)

Luuka Town, also known as Luuka Municipality, but often referred to simply as Luuka, is a town in Eastern Uganda. Prior to 1 July 2010, Luuka Town was known as "Kiyunga". It is the principal political, administrative and commercial center of Luuka District.

== Location ==
Luuka Town is located in Luuka District, Busoga Sub-region, in the Eastern Region of Uganda. It is located approximately 28 kilometres (17 mi), by road, northwest of Iganga, the nearest large town. This location is approximately 50 kilometres (31 mi), by road, northeast of Jinja, the largest city in the sub-region. The approximate coordinates of the town are:0°45'51.0"N, 33°19'55.0"E (Latitude:0.764167; Longitude:33.331944).

== Population ==
As of January 2015, the exact population of Luuka Town is not publicly known.

== Landmarks ==
The landmarks within the town limits or close to the edges of town include:

- The headquarters of Luuka District Administration
- The offices of Luuka Town Council
- Luuka Central Market
- Paidha Cultural Center

== See also ==
- Luuka District
- Busoga sub-region
- Eastern Region, Uganda
