= Maseko v Maseko =

South African legal case

Maseko v Maseko, heard in the Witwatersrand Local Division by Lazarus AJ from 22 to 25 October, 1990, with judgment handed down on 16 November, is an important case in South African contract law, with its stipulation, on the question of legality, that contracts designed to mislead creditors are immoral and against public policy.

The plaintiff in this case, in order to protect her property from possible attachment in execution, had entered into an agreement with the defendant that they would marry, transfer the property to him, thereafter divorce and then retransfer the property to her once the threat of attachment was over. The purpose of this agreement was to conceal the property from the creditor, and possibly others; as such, it was contrary to public policy.

The court also held that, when a contract is void ab initio, the remedy of restitutio in integrum will not be available. The essence of the remedy is that there should be a valid legal transaction from which the court will in certain circumstances grant relief by avoiding it ab initio.

== Facts ==
The plaintiff acquired a certificate of occupation of certain property in Soweto, whereafter she signed as surety for two purchasers of motor vehicles. Some time later, when the purchasers defaulted in their payments on the purchase price of the vehicles, the possibility arose of her being held liable in terms of the suretyships. In order to protect her property—that is, her certificate of occupation—she and defendant entered into an agreement whereby they were to be married and then transfer the property to the defendant. They would later get a divorce and, when there was no longer a threat that the property might be attached in execution, retransfer the property to the plaintiff.

The parties were duly married on 9 May 1985. Less than a week later, the plaintiff ceded her property to the defendant. Divorce proceedings were instituted three days later, and an agreement of settlement was reached at the end of May. A divorce order, incorporating the agreement of settlement, was granted on 12 June. One of the terms of the agreement of settlement made an order of court was that the defendant "shall retain as his sole and exclusive property all right, title and interest in certain immovable property," which is to say the property transferred to him by the plaintiff.

The defendant refused to retransfer the property to the plaintiff, who sued.

== Judgment ==
In an action for an order directing the defendant to fulfil his end of the agreement, the court held that there was no doubt that the purpose of the agreement had been to conceal the plaintiff's assets from the creditor in whose favour she had signed as surety, and possibly other creditors. While there could be no fraudem creditorum without proof of actual prejudice, an agreement designed to mislead creditors was immoral and against public policy, even if it had not yet served its purpose.

The court also found that the agreement operated to undermine the institution of marriage, in that the parties' overall plan had been inimical to the institution of marriage. Although the marriage and divorce were valid, the agreement itself was not. The transfer of the property was an inseparable part of that agreement.

The remedy of restitutio in integrum, furthermore, was not available to the plaintiff, as it was of the essence of that remedy that there should be a valid legal transaction to start with, from which the Court, in certain circumstances, granted relief by avoiding it ab initio. The court held that, as the transfer was ab initio void, the remedy of restitutio in integrum was not available to the plaintiff.

As to the remedy of restitution based on the transfer's being void ab initio, the court held that the parties were in pari delicto: If an order in favour of the plaintiff were not made, the defendant would be substantially enriched at the plaintiff's expense; if the order were made, the Court would be enforcing indirectly an illegal contract. The in pari delicto rule ordinarily served to preclude a plaintiff's recovering what was handed over under a contract or transaction which was void for illegality, but there were well-known exceptions to the rule. These were founded on the principles of equity and public policy. Each case had to be decided on its own facts; there was no general rule on the topic. Despite the fact that the relief sought might have an effect similar to enforcement (that is, of an illegal contract), the Court could still grant relief if the equities favoured it.

While the plaintiff's conduct was deserving of some censure, the court found that the defendant's conduct approximated theft. Public policy could surely not tolerate that. Accordingly, the in pari delicto rule was relaxed in this case.

If, however, relief were to be granted, it would be in conflict with the divorce order, with its provision that the defendant "shall retain as his sole and exclusive property" the property in issue. That order, although made by consent and in terms of an illegal agreement, was a valid order until set aside; it could not be ignored. As it could not be said that evidence relevant to the setting aside of the order had been fully canvassed, the court found that it could not grant such relief.

The action was dismissed.

== See also ==
- Contract
- Law of South Africa
- South African contract law
