= Chiefdom of Bunya =

Traditional chiefdom of the kingdom of Busoga in Uganda

Bunya (sometimes called Bunha) is one of the six traditional chiefdoms of the kingdom of Busoga in Uganda.

It was founded before 1737 and became a part of the British protectorate in Busoga in 1896.

Its ruler is known as the Luba.
