= Bugweri Chiefdom =

Traditional chiefdom in Busoga, Uganda

Bugweri
- Traditional chiefdom
- Bugweri (Bugweri Bufutulu)
- Country: Uganda
- Region: Eastern Region
- Kingdom: Busoga
- Royal seat: Igombe (Bugweri County)

Government
  - Menhya (traditional chief): Fred Nelson Kakaire Ntuse Mamala Menhya Zirabamuzale (died 2016)
- Time zone: UTC+3 (EAT)

Bugweri (sometimes called Bugweri Bufutulu) is one of the six traditional chiefdoms of the kingdom of Busoga in Uganda.

It was founded around 1726 and became a part of the British protectorate in Busoga in 1896. Its ruler is known as the Menya.

While in the 18th century, their founder Kakaire enthroned himself in the southern part of Bugweri and hijacked power from the Abaise Musuubo clan. Their rulers are given the title of Menha.

Prince Fred Nelson Kakaire Ntuse Mamala Menhya Zirabamuzale died in August 2016 after illness.

== History ==
Bugweri, one of the eleven hereditary chiefdoms of Busoga Kingdom in eastern Uganda, was formed when local leaders broke away to establish their own rule. Its rulers hold the title Menha, and the chiefdom later joined other Busoga states under colonial influence in the late 19th century.

== Modern status ==
Uganda’s constitutional framework allows traditional or cultural leadership institutions to exist, under Article 246 of the 1995 Constitution (Institution of Traditional or Cultural Leaders). The Institution of Traditional or Cultural Leaders Act (2011) provides related statutory provisions for traditional and cultural leaders.

A local government district named Bugweri District was created in FY 2018/19, carved out of Iganga District. The district reports a 2024 census population of 211,511 (99,283 male; 112,228 female) and a land area of 378.9 square kilometres.

== See also ==
- Busoga Kingdom
- Bugabula Kingdom
- Bulamogi Kingdom
- Kigulu Kingdom
- Luuka Kingdom
- Traditional chiefdoms of Busoga
- Kyabazinga of Busoga
- Eastern Uganda cultural institutions
- Busoga
- Kyabazinga of Busoga
- Bugweri District
