= Butembe =

Chiefdom of Busoga, Uganda

Butembe Chiefdom
- Traditional chiefdom
- Country: Uganda
- Region: Eastern Uganda
- Kingdom: Busoga
- Established: Before 1896
- British protectorate: 1896

Government
  - Type: Traditional monarchy
  - Chief: Ayub Banamwita
- Time zone: UTC+3 (EAT)

Butembe is one of the eleven traditional chiefdoms within the Kingdom of Busoga in eastern Uganda, serving as an important administrative and cultural unit within the broader Busoga political structure. The chiefdom became part of the British protectorate in Busoga in 1896, marking its formal incorporation into colonial administrative structures. The traditional ruler of Butembe holds the title of Ntembe, maintaining the hereditary leadership system that has governed the chiefdom for centuries.

== History ==
Butembe's establishment predates the arrival of British colonial administration in the region, functioning as one of the semi-autonomous chiefdoms that characterized the political landscape of Busoga before unification under the broader kingdom structure. The chiefdom was among the hereditary administrative units expanded by British colonialists when they established their hegemony over Busoga, creating a network of traditional authorities that served colonial administrative purposes.

When the British established the protectorate system in 1896, Butembe was incorporated alongside other traditional chiefdoms including Bukono, Bulamogi, Bunyole, and Kigulu, bringing the total number of recognized chiefdoms to eleven within the Busoga kingdom structure. This expansion represented the colonial administration's strategy of utilizing existing traditional governance structures while adapting them to serve British administrative needs.

== Governance ==
The chiefdom operates under a traditional monarchy system headed by the Ntembe, who serves as the hereditary chief of Butembe. This leadership structure maintains continuity with pre-colonial governance systems while functioning within the modern context of the Busoga Kingdom, which itself operates as one of Uganda's four constitutional kingdoms.

The chiefdom's governance structure reflects the broader pattern of traditional authority in Busoga, where individual chiefdoms maintain their distinct identities and leadership while participating in the larger kingdom framework. This system represents a balance between maintaining cultural traditions and adapting to contemporary political structures within Uganda's constitutional framework.

== Cultural significance ==
Butembe serves as an important cultural institution within the Busoga Kingdom, preserving traditional practices and customs that have been maintained for generations. The chiefdom's role extends beyond administrative functions to include cultural preservation, traditional ceremonies, and the maintenance of customary law systems that continue to influence local governance and social organization.
