= Busoga =

Traditional Bantu kingdom in present-day Uganda

Kingdom of Busoga Obwakyabazinga bwa Busoga
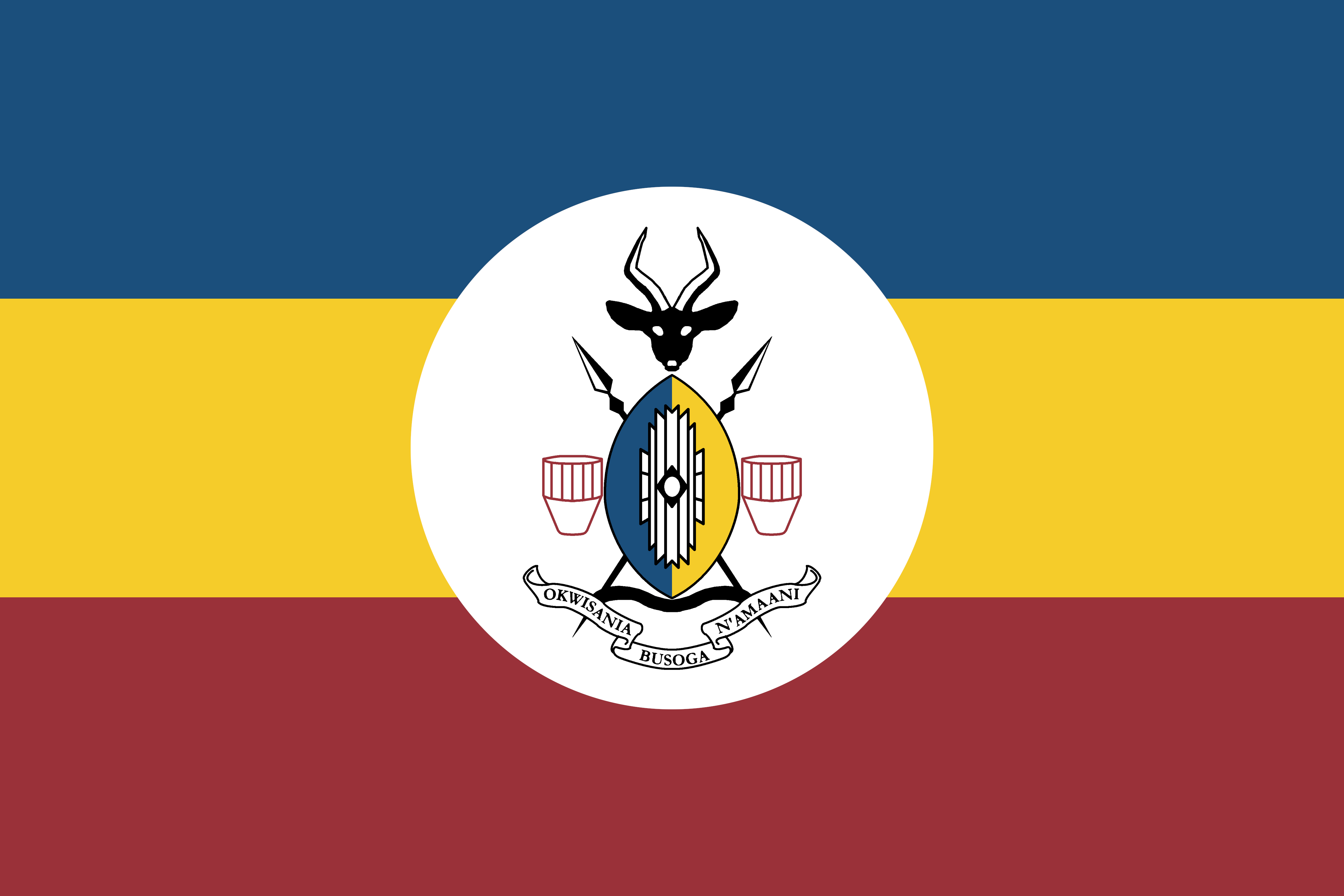
- Flag Coat of arms
- Anthem: Tuli bankabi inhyo, ye nga twesimye inhyo
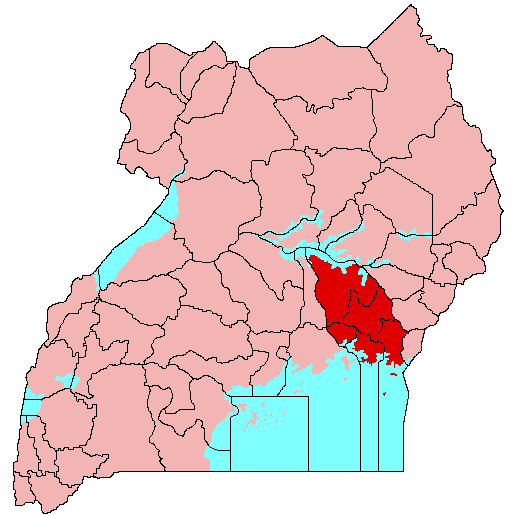
- Location of Busoga (red) in Uganda (pink)
- Status: Traditional kingdom
- Capital: Bugembe
- Official languages: Lusoga, English
- Ethnic groups: Basoga
- Government: Elective constitutional monarchy
  - Monarch: Nadiope IV
  - Prime Minister: Joseph Muvawala Nsekere
- Legislature: Lukiiko

Establishment
  - First Kyabazinga crowned: 11 February 1939
  - Monarchy abolished by Obote: 17 September 1967
  - Monarchy restored: 11 February 1995

Area
  - Total: 10,318.1 km^{2} (3,983.8 sq mi)

Population
  - Estimate: 4,500,000
- Currency: Ugandan shilling
- Time zone: UTC+3 (EAT)
- Calling code: 256

- Person: OmuSoga
- People: AbaSoga
- Language: OluSoga
- Country: BuSoga

Busoga (Lusoga: Obwakyabazinga bwa Busoga) is one of the 17 recognised traditional constitutional monarchies in present-day Uganda. The kingdom is a cultural institution which promotes popular participation and unity among the people of the region through development programs to improve their standard of living.

Busoga means "Land of the Soga", and is the kingdom of the 11 principalities of the Basoga or Soga (singular Musoga) people. Its capital is Bugembe, near Jinja (Uganda's second-largest city, after Kampala). Busoga comprises eleven districts: Kamuli, Iganga, Bugiri, Mayuge, Jinja, Luuka and the new districts of Bugweri, Buyende, Kaliro, Namutumba and Namayingo. Each district is headed by an elected chairperson or a Local Council Five, and municipalities are headed by an elected mayor. Jinja is the industrial and economic hub of Busoga. Busoga is bordered on the north by shallow Lake Kyoga (separating it from Lango), on the west by the Victoria Nile (separating it from Buganda), on the south by Lake Victoria (separating it from Tanzania and Kenya) and on the east by the Mpologoma River (separating it from smaller tribal groups such as the Adhola, Bugwere and Bugisu). It also includes several islands in Lake Victoria, such as Buvuma Island.

== Etymology ==
The people who first settled in the area now called Busoga were remnants of the Southern Bantu expansion. Most of that expansion stopped at the mighty River Nile which was too hard to cross so people instead moved south into what is now Tanzania. However, it is believed that some Bantu people must have figured how to get across the Nile to the lands called Busoga.

By coincidence the people realised that the area was well protected by water bodies on all sides. To the North was Lake Kyoga, to the West there was River Nile, to the East run River Mpologoma, and Lake Victoria to the South. This allowed the community to thrive and gradually coalesced into organised societies.

Because of the "protected" nature of the area there was little need for an army as such, but this was to change as the powerful Buganda Kingdom developed on the western side of the River Nile.

Buganda had developed a complex clan structure of 52 clans that forbade people from the same or related clans to marry. With time this had created a shortage of women that men could marry - compounded by the fact that many Baganda chiefs had tens of wives. Buganda therefore began to expand and one of the reasons was to capture women from neighbouring areas. At first this was focused to the west where the Bunyoro, Toro and Ankole peoples who had no natural protection unlike the people to the east of the River Nile.

Bunyoro resistance grew and Buganda increasingly found it difficult to expand West and the Bunyoro kingdom could match its military might - so attention turned to the East.

The Achilles heel of the natural protection of the area now called Busoga was Lake Victoria. The Baganda could not tame the mighty River Nile but they had for many generations learnt how to use canoes on Lake Victoria (called Nalubaale before the arrival of the British who renamed it). This was significant as Nalubaale is home to the Sesse Islands a place of deep cultural heritage to the Baganda - it is believed Kintu the first Kabaka (King) came from there. All Kabakas since have made the pilgrimage to the island's shrines.

During the reign of Kabaka Jemba Busungwe (circa 1564-1584) - Jemba of Buganda, one of his chiefs, Sekamaanya ventured east on the lake on his way back from Sesse Islands, where he found a large uninhabited island. When he climbed to the highest point he noticed that he could see more land north - he was looking at the area now called Busoga. He reported back to the []Kabaka. Because he had "looked" from the Island - he called the island "Lingira" - which means "to look" in Luganda.

Soon Baganda warriors were on their way to conquer this land. They met little resistance when they came to shore and took women as was the custom back to Buganda.

Although not as complex as the Buganda clan system, the people in the area now called Busoga had a structured hereditary system based on family descendants - called "Abaise". As the Baganda moved deeper into the area they began to encounter members of the larger family units who were more organised.

The people in the area were expert fishermen and had developed unique ways to hunt for fish in the thick swamps in the area. One tool was a short stabbing spear which was used to stab fish that came to the clearer surface. They began to use these short spears against the Baganda invaders.

They would hide in the bushes and when the Baganda warriors came through they would ambush them and stab them with the short spears. Without distance between them and the assailant, Baganda warriors long spears that were thrown at enemies were useless.

In the Luganda language "Okussoga" means "to stab" - and they referred to their assailants as Aba'ssoga" - "those who stab". This where the word "Soga" comes from and the people referred to as "Basoga"

Although the Baganda were unable to conquer Busoga, their influence in the South Busoga area grew - especially as some Baganda chiefs and warriors decided to settle there and were integrated into the local culture.

In the North another Kingdom was exerting its power over Busoga. Bunyoro like their main rivals the Buganda were expanding. Bunyoro's expansion was the need for more land and intense leadership rivalry. Unable to go South due to Buganda, Bunyoro chiefs (Mukama) began to look to the North and North East.

In the 16th Century, Mukama Namutukula found a way to navigate the swampy shores of Lake Kyoga on foot and ended up stranded in the North of Busoga. He had travelled with his wives and a handful of warriors.

He found a land sparsely populated so he built a settlement on a hill locally called Kagulu Rock near Lyingo. Not only was it picturesque it was also full of wildlife to hunt - something Namutukula enjoyed. He also brought metal working to the area and the warrior tradition from Bunyoro - forming a small army made up of locals to protect Lyingo. To many Basoga this is the true origin of the Kingdom of Busoga.

Namutukula had many children while at Kagulu Rock but he never truly settled - he was homesick - and one day he gathered a few warriors together and headed back to Bunyoro via the way he had come. It is not clear whether he made it back or died along the way. The later is the most probable as no further account of him exists.

He had many children at Kagulu Rock - five sons survived. They had all inherited their fathers warrior traditions and when they came of age each had built sizeable armies and followers. Their mothers, recalling the disastrous rivalry that had forced them to leave Bunyoro urged their sons not to fight but to share the now sizeable land their father had left behind.

Therefore, The eldest Wakoli, received Bukooli - Bukooli Chiefdom; Zibondo received Bulamogi, Ngobi got Kigulu, Tabingwa got Luuka, and the youngest son, Kitimbo, received Bugabula. There was no need to have one brother as overall King because they believed their father would one day return to Lyingo.

The sons extended their territories south becoming more influential. They also adopted the "Abaise" hereditary structure - thus some of the most influential clans in Busoga have their names - e.g. "Abaise Ngobi", "Abaise-Tabingwa"etc. By the time the Arab traders and British arrived, the son's authority covered most of Northern and Central Busoga.

When the Arab traders came through Busoga on their way to Buganda they went through the South along the shores of Lake Victoria by canoe, avoiding the Nile and using the same route on Naluubale Lake Victoria that the Baganda used, and when they got to Buganda - they were told they had passed south of "Busoga" - and it was an island with large expanses of water on all sides. The Arabs returned to the East African coast referring to the "island" of "Usoga". This island myth is why most of the first European explorers chose to go around the longer route south of Lake Victoria - through present day Tanzania to get to Buganda.

== Contact with Europeans ==
=== Contact with European Explorers and Missionaries ===
On 28 July 1862 Royal Geographical Society explorer John Hanning Speke arrived at Ripon Falls (near present day Jinja), where the Victoria Nile flows from Lake Victoria and begins its descent to Egypt. Since Speke's route (inland from the East African coast) took him around the southern end of Lake Victoria, he approached Busoga from the west (through Buganda). Having reached his goal (the source of the Nile), he turned northward and followed the river downstream without exploring Busoga. He records, however, being told that Usoga (Swahili for Busoga) was an island (it is bordered on all four sides by water). He gazed across at Busoga and described the scene, but did not cross the river.

The "Usoga Island" myth meant that Busoga was relatively unexplored by Arab traders and European explorers even after quite a significant number of them had reached Buganda using the Southern route around the southern part of Lake Victoria. Buganda was a target due to the lucrative ivory trade.

The "Usoga Island' myth had also entered Buganda folklore. Buganda's failure to advance further north into Busoga from the Lake Victoria shores had made it a vulnerability to the Kingdom and stories of Europeans colonising areas from the East African coast has reached Buganda. This was further accentuated by the Buganda Oracles (Emmandwa) who warned the Kabaka that the conqueror of the Kingdom would come from the East.

The Kabaka did have some little influence in Southern Busoga along the shores of Lake Victoria and had a number of chiefs there who were under his control including Chief Luba in Chiefdom of Bunya. Many of them were descendants of the Baganda warriors who had failed to conquer Busoga but had settled and intermarried with locals along the shores of Lake Victoria.

It was always believed there must be a route to Buganda north of Lake Victoria through present day Kenya. The Southern route was considered treacherous and many European explorers who had travelled through Kenya reported it as a less treacherous route.

Joseph Thomson (explorer) of the Royal Geographical Society led an expedition in 1883-4 to the northern shores of Lake Victoria but went no further. He had been warned by locals about the fierce Mwanga II of Buganda who was obsessed by the thought of enemies (including missionaries) coming from the East across Usoga to destroy his kingdom - so Thompson turned back. The furthest point he got to before turning back was Sio Port in present day Busia County, Western Kenya.

British explorers and traders were also looking for an easier roue to get to Buganda from the East African coast mainly to strengthen British Empire trade in the region while avoiding Masai who were often hostile and German competitors present day Tanzania.

On July 23, 1885, Bishop James Hannington of the Church Missionary Society set off from Rabai - north of Mombasa with a caravan of 200 porters and a local deacon he had personally ordained called William Jones or "Bombay African"- to find the route to Buganda through the mysterious "Usoga".

On October 8 they reached the Northeastern tip of Lake Victoria at Kavirondo closely following a route first explored by Joseph Thomson (explorer).James Hannington was aware of the warnings about Mwanga II of Buganda, but ignored these and continued west.

Hannington left Jones at Kavirondo, ignoring the same warnings and proceeded further into the unknown with 50 porters. He reached Sio Port (Bay) on October 14. And a few miles west encountered the first evidence of Baganda warriors using the Lake to attack locals along the shores when he found abandoned and destroyed villages. These were probably the same warriors who were attacking "Usoga" further west.

In October 1885, James Hannington was probably the first European to set foot in Usoga when he crossed the swamps that were most probably tributaries of River Mpologoma flowing into Lake Victoria. In his journal he writes "...and finally we fell in with a Wa-Ganda mob sent to subdue and settle in U-Soga".

James Hannington met Chief Luba about this time. Their relationship was acrimonious from the start with Luba demanding guns and insisting that James Hannington progress no further. James Hannington dismissed these demands despite being surrounded by hundreds of the chief's warriors.

Amidst this James Hannington managed to elude Luba's men for a while and continued west and up a hill where he for the first rime sighted the River Nile and confirming he had crossed Usoga.

This angered Luba who sent his men to get James Hannington who was beaten, stripped and dragged through the bush by his feet into captivity.

Luba now sent emissaries to Mwanga II of Buganda asking whether to let James Hannington through. Cynically, Luba also pressured James Hannington to write a letter to the Kabaka and Alexander Murdoch Mackay of the Church Missionary Society who was in Buganda having travelled there in 1876 via the Southern Route. Luba asked that James Hannington in his letter say he had not been mistreated.

Alexander Murdoch Mackay was well known across Buganda and in Luba's area of control, as he had developed a close relationship with Muteesa I of Buganda, who had been very amiable to Europeans and encouraged Christian missionaries to come to his kingdom. Alexander Murdoch Mackay is referenced many times in James Hannington's journals indicating he too knew of the influence Alexander Murdoch Mackay had in Buganda

However, when Muteesa I of Buganda died in October 1884 (eight months before James Hannington started his journey) and was succeeded by his son, Mwanga II of Buganda, Alexander Murdoch Mackay had lost his influence because Mwanga II of Buganda was extremely suspicious of and despised Christianity and was purging Christians from his palace and killing followers - including the Uganda Martyrs

It was amid this atmosphere that the message from Luba arrived. Mwanga II of Buganda ordered that James Hannington be killed and sent his own warriors to execute him. Alexander Murdoch Mackay did try and intervene later but was too late - the assassins had already set off.

Astonishing, James Hannington's journal was recovered from Mwanga II of Buganda many years later in June 1886 by Alexander Murdoch Mackay, most probably brought back to the Kabaka by the warriors sent to execute James Hannington.

James Hannington's expedition and journal dispelled the "Usoga Island" myth and opened a new route from the East African coast to Buganda. South Busoga now became an important trade route to Buganda

== The Colonial Period ==
=== Local Divisions ===
James Hannington's expedition had dispelled the idea that the route through Busoga was unsuitable due to it being an "island". Now many explorers and traders opted for this route to get to Buganda. During the 19th century, one of the main routes along which Europeans travelled from the coast to Buganda passed through southern Busoga. Explorers, traders, missionaries and future British colonialists now came to Buganda through this route. It was faster, less arduous and sped up the colonialisation of Buganda and the surrounding areas.

== The Kyabazinga ==
The Kyabazinga of Busoga is not directly succeeded by one of his children(princes) but he is elected from the five royal clans of Busoga.

Busoga is ruled by the Isebantu Kyabazinga, who is currently William Kadhumbula Gabula Nadiope IV, the Gabula of Bugabula, and grandson to Wilberforce Kadhumbula Nadiope, former vice president and also Kyabazinga of Busoga Kingdom. In 1995, the government restored monarchies in Uganda in Article 246(1) of the constitution of Uganda. On 11 February 1996, Henry Wako Muloki was reinstated as Kyabazinga Isebantu of Busoga. He served until 1 September 2008, when he died of esophageal cancer at the Mulago National Referral Hospital in Kampala at age 87. In a condolence message, Ugandan president Yoweri Museveni described Muloki as "a great cultural leader and father" who was "generous and kind". Museveni noted that since his re-installation, Muloki was a unifying factor in Busoga: "The Government has had the privilege of working with Isebantu Muloki in developing our nation". Referring to the Kyabazinga as "a strong pillar", the president said that although Busoga was one of the youngest kingdoms, under Muloki's leadership it had become strong: "Uganda mourns not only one of her esteemed traditional leaders but a national who put development and the welfare of the people of Busoga at the helm of his reign". Muloki's achievements included programs for youth, the elderly, and the poor and the education of girls. Although the Royal Chiefs of Busoga at first elected Edward Columbus Wambuzi, Muloki's son, as Kyabazinga of Busoga, the election was contested due to lack of quorum (at least eight chiefs) and thus electing later Gabula Nadiope IV with ten out of eleven chiefs and was crowned on 13 September 2014.

== Demographics ==
=== Urban Population ===
However, between 1898–99 and 1900–01 the first cases of sleeping sickness were reported.

In 1906, orders were issued to evacuate the region. Despite attempts to clear the area, the epidemic continued until 1910. As a result, most of the densely populated parts of Busoga (with an original population of over 200,000) were depopulated within ten years. Lubas Palace at Bukaleba and the European fruit mission collapsed, and survivors were relocated to other parts of Busoga. Southern Busoga, about one-third of the kingdom's area, was depopulated by 1910. During the 1920s and 1930s, some evacuees who survived the epidemic began to return to their original land. In 1940 a new outbreak appeared in the area, and only in 1956 did resettlement (promoted by the government) begin again.

The result of the epidemic was that southern Busoga, its most densely populated area, was virtually uninhabited. Other areas affected by sleeping sickness, including eastern Bukooli and Busiki, were depopulated as well. Famines also triggered substantial population movements. Parts of northeastern Busoga and the adjacent Bukandi district (across the Mpologoma River) experienced famines in 1898–1900, 1907, 1908, 1917, 1918 and 1944. Populations in these areas shrank; many people were killed by the famines, and survivors moved to other areas for safety.

The effects of these movements were apparent in the growth in population of central and peri-urban Busoga. Many Basoga left Busoga during this period for other districts.

=== Economics ===
During the pre-colonial era, people left their traditional lands and state structures disappeared. A number of clans and chiefdoms were decimated by famine and epidemics, and people migrated to Busoga with the traditions and cultures of other lands. A need for security fueled population growth in urban and peri-urban areas of Busoga such as Jinja, Iganga, Kamuli, Kaliro, Bugiri and their surrounding areas

From 1920 to the 1970s, Jinja (Busoga's capital) gained economic importance due to cotton production and the completion of the Uganda Railway and the Owen Falls Dam. The town became an agri-industrial centre with factories, cottage industries and a well-developed infrastructure. People from rural Busoga came to work in the factories and in domestic work. Among the newcomers were Asian families. Services such as piped water, electricity, roads, hospitals and schools were improved to serve the growing population. Farmers were assured of markets in the towns, grew cash and food crops such as cotton, coffee, bananas, potatoes, cassava, fruits and vegetables. The standard of living improved; the kingdom's revenue increased, enabling it to build more infrastructure. Subsistence farming diminished, with the population turning to economic production demanded by the Europeans.

By the time of independence in 1962, Busoga was one of the most prosperous regions in Uganda. Jinja was home to 70 percent of Uganda's industries and the Nalubaale Power Station (Owen Falls Dam), which supplies electricity to Uganda and parts of Kenya and Tanzania. Jinja was also home to the majority of Uganda's Asian population. These Ugandan Asians, brought to Uganda from the Indian sub-continent by the British during the Raj, helped establish Jinja as one of East Africa's largest commercial centres.

=== Politics ===
Around the turn of the 16th century, the Baisengobi clan from Bunyoro gained power. Mukama Namutukula of the royal Babiito family of Bunyoro is said to have left Bunyoro during the 16th century as part of the kingdom's expansion policy, travelling east across Lake Kyoga with his wife Nawudo, a few servants, arms and a dog and landing at Iyingo in northern Busoga (in the present-day Kamuli District).

Mukama, who enjoyed hunting, was taken with the land. He engaged in metalworking: blacksmithing and making hoes, iron utensils and spears. Of Mukama's children five boys survived, and when he returned to Bunyoro he gave them land to oversee. His firstborn, Wakoli, received Bukooli; Zibondo received Bulamogi, Ngobi Kigulu, Tabingwa Luuka, and the youngest son, Kitimbo, received Bugabula. These areas later became administrative and cultural centers in Busoga. When Mukama did not return, his sons regarded themselves as the legitimate rulers of their respective areas. They presided over their dominions, employing governing methods and cultural rituals similar to those in Bunyoro. This political and cultural arrangement in Busoga continued until the late 19th century, when the colonialists persuaded its rulers to organize a federation. The federation was governed by a Lukiiko.

Although Busoga is called a "kingdom", it did not have a central ruler before 1906, unlike its western neighbor Buganda. In 1906, a central administrator—later a King—was installed at the behest of the British. Before this, the Basoga were organized in semi-autonomous chiefdoms influenced by Bunyoro and, later, Buganda. Some of the chiefs were appointed by the Kabaka, and, before the ascendancy of Buganda as the region’s dominant power, by the Omukama of Bunyoro.

Busoga's first native King was the chief of Bugabula, Yosia Nadiope. Nadiope died in 1913 and was, in 1919, succeeded by the chief of Bulamogi, Ezekiel Tenywa Wako, who had both support of the colonialist British support and an administrative background, in addition to his being educated at the prestigious Kings' College Budo. Gideon Obodha of Kigulu (another contender for the post) was unfamiliar with the British system, and William Wilberforce Nadiope Kadhumbula of Bugabula was an infant whose regent (Mwami Mutekanga) was ineligible as a mukoopi (a commoner). In 1918-19, the title of Isebantu Kyabazinga was created and Wako took the throne. In 1925 Wako became a member of the Uganda Kings Council, consisting of the Kyabazinga of Busoga, the Kabaka of Buganda, the Omukamas of Bunyoro and Toro and the Omugabe of Ankole.

On 11 February 1939 Owekitibwa Ezekerial Tenywa Wako, father of the last Kyabazinga of Busoga Henry Wako Muloki and the Zibondo of Bulamogi, was installed as the first Kyabazinga of Busoga (a title he held until his 1949 retirement). By Wako's retirement, the Lukiiko had expanded to include elected representatives (two from each of Busoga's 55 sub-counties).

When Wako retired the Busoga Lukiiko resolved that the Kyabazinga should be elected from the five lineages of Baise Ngobi (Ababiito), hereditary rulers traditionally believed to have been the five sons of the Omukama of Bunyoro who migrated to Busoga from Bunyoro (present-day Bunyoro-Kitara and Tooro kindgoms). This method of election was used for subsequent elections, beginning in 1949 when Owekitibwa Chief William Wilberforce Nadiope Kadhumbula of Bugabula was elected. He served for two terms of three years each, followed by Henry Wako Muloki (who also served two terms). In 1957, the title Inhebantu of Busoga was introduced for the wife of the Kyabazinga (or Isebantu).

When monarchies were abolished in 1966, the Kyabazinga was dethroned. Idi Amin expelled the Asians from Uganda in 1972, and Jinja suffered socially and economically. The government of Yoweri Museveni has tried to encourage them to return. The Asian influence remains, particularly in architecture and street names.

In 1995, the government restored monarchies in Uganda. On 11 February, Henry Wako Muloki was reinstated as Kyabazinga according to Kisogan tradition. Unlike most monarchs, the Kyabazinga has no heir or crown prince but is succeeded by a chief elected by the Lukiiko and the Royal Council.

=== Past Kyabazingas ===
Three past Kyabazingas have presided over the federated state of Busoga since 1939: Ezekiel Tenywa Wako, Yosia Nadiope and William Wilberforce Nadiope Kadhumbula. Kadhumbula waged an emizindula (war on theft) and ended a British practice in the fight against smallpox (kawumpuli) where residents were required to publicly supply rat tails for counting to prove that they had killed the rats. His opposition brought him into conflict with the British; he was exiled to Bunyoro, later leading the Basoga into the Second World War.

Kadhumbula played an important role in Uganda's independence struggle; he was also the first vice-president of independent Uganda and chairman of the Uganda People's Congress (UPC). Kadhumbula built infrastructure such as roads, hospitals and government centres, and mobilised the Basoga for agriculture. Balangira High School later became Busoga College.

=== Political structure ===
The Busoga Royal Council is composed of the 11 traditional leaders of Busoga: the heads of the five royal families and the six tribal chiefs.

Title	Principality / Chiefdom	Head
Zibondo	Bulamogi	Edward Wambuzi
Gabula	Bugabula	William Nadiope
Ngobi	Kigulu	Izimba Gologolo
Tabingwa	Luuka	W. Tabingwa Nabwana
Nkono	Bukono	C. J. Mutyaba Nkono
Wakooli	Bukooli	David Muluuya Kawunye
Ntembe	Butembe	Badru Waguma
Menha	Bugweri	Kakaire Fred Menya
Kisiki	Busiki	Yekosofato Kawanguzi
Luba	Bunha	Juma Munulo
Nanhumba	Bunhole	Nkwighe Bukumunhe

The Katukiro (Prime Minister) of Busoga is Joseph Muvawala Nsekere . The office of the Katukiro in the Kingdom is an important and a vital one. The Katukiro is the head of the kingdom's government, and the spokesperson for the Kyabazinga and the kingdom.

== Ebiika bya Busoga (Clans of Busoga) ==
Clans of Busoga
Baise / Paternity	Muziro / Totem	Nkuni / Origin
Balwa	Ndu ntono /lungfish	Bukono
Bandha	Bush buck	Banda; Kilongero, Kisaho
Beyi		Bugweri
Basikwe	Butiko / mushrooms	
Butanda	Ndhaza / reedbuck	Bugulu
Bwire	Ndu entono / lungfish	Buvuma, Budiope;Budhumba
Diaga	Ndu entono /lung fish	
Gabanya		Bunyuli
Ibaale	Kaduba / fish;Mbwa	Busiki; Butamba
Ibamba	Nduntono / smalllung fish	Busiki; Kigulu;Buvuma
Ibango	Isonsole; ndegeya/weaverbird	
Ibere	Katikati	Bukooli
Ibinga	Mbwa / dog	Kasodo, Kizenguli, Ikonero Bugweri;Ibinga, Busiki
Ibira	Ntukulu; Ihemba (dove)	Bukumbi
Ibooka	Ikovu / snail	
Idibya		Bubaala
Igaga	Mbogo / hare	Namagiro;Busambira; Busiki
Igembe	Ntukulu	Namunhole, Busiki, Kisambira
Ighemula	Namusisi;Kasombamooya	Busimbi
Batimbito

== Attractions and historic sites ==
=== Kagulu Rock ===
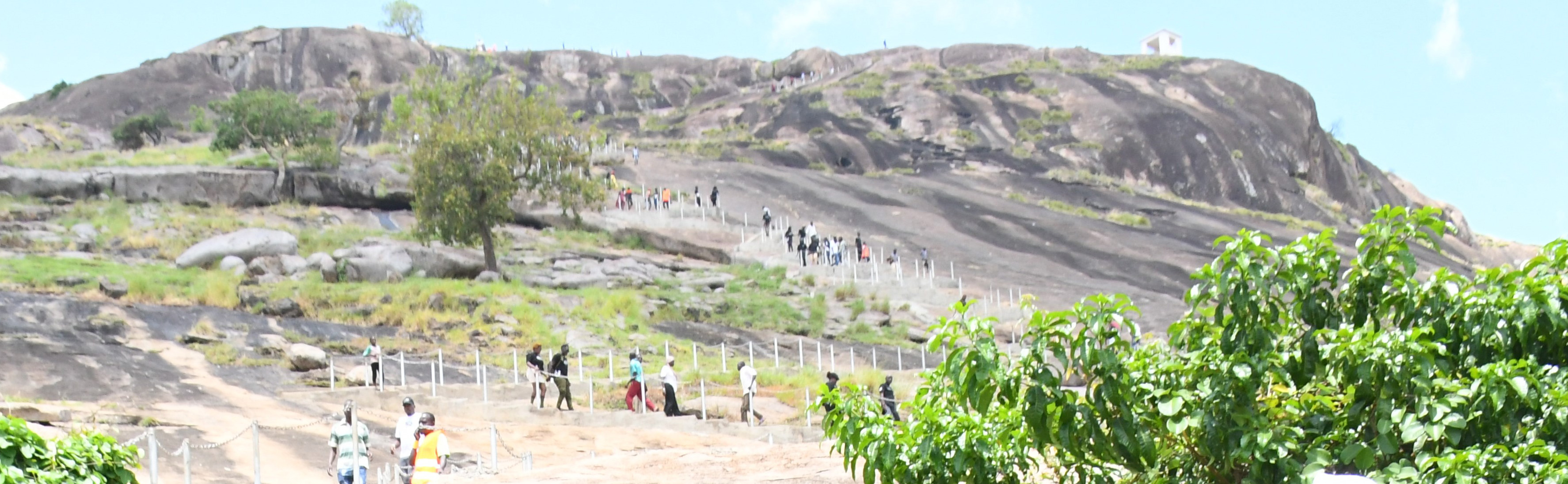
Kagulu Rock

This was the first settlement area for the Bunyoro Basoga, led by Mukama. Although Kagulu's cultural influence is widespread, its visible landmark is Kagulu Rock. The rock is between two roads which fork at its foot, leading to Gwaya and Iyingo. The rock has a clear view of almost all Busoga, with steps making it easier for visitors to reach the top. Kagulu Rock has been for a long time a major adventure and tourist attraction in Eastern Uganda. Previously, it had caught the curious eyes of the foreign NGO workers in the area, but with the advent of the local initiative to promote the site, Kagulu Rock is now a big attraction to all. Kagulu Rock, is a rocky prominence that rises 10,000 feet (3,048 m), above sea level.

=== Budhumbula shrine and palace ===
Two kilometers from Kamuli on the Kamuli-Jinja road, the site includes a shrine and the residence of former Kyabazinga William Wilberforce Kadhumbula Nadiope (who died in 1976). The marble-covered shrine contains the graves of other members of the royal family, including Nadiope's father and mother (Yosia Nadiope and Nasikombi). Other graves in the shrine are those of his son, former Uganda government minister Wilson Nadiope (who died in 1991), and his mother, Yuliya Babirye Nadiope (who died in 2004). The main palace residence is a legacy of the British colonial government, which donated it in 1914.

=== Source of the Nile ===
The source of the Nile, the world's longest river, at Lake Victoria was discovered by John Speke and is an internationally known attraction.

=== Bujjagali Falls ===
This former waterfall was submerged in November 2011 by the Bujagali Dam.

=== Lake Victoria ===
Southern Busoga is bordered by Lake Victoria, whose coastline runs from Jinja east to the Kenyan border.

=== Bishop James Hannington Shrine ===
The place where Bishop James Hannington and 48 of his helpers are believed to have been murdered in 1885.

== Twegaite ==
This nonprofit cultural organization is headquartered in Boston. Twegaite's main objective is to revitalize Busoga's economy, health and education.

== See also ==
- Soga language

== Sources ==
- Fallers, Margaret Chave (1960) The Eastern Lacustrine Bantu (Ganda and Soga). Ethnographic survey of Africa: East central Africa, Vol 11. London: International African Institute.
- Cohen, David William (1970). A survey of interlacustrine chronology. The Journal of African History, 1970, 11, 2, 177-202.
- Cohen, David William (1986). Towards a reconstructed past: Historical texts from Busoga, Uganda. (Fontes historiae africanae). Oxford: Oxford University Press.
- Fallers, Lloyd A. (1965) Bantu Bureaucracy - A Century of Political evolution among the Basoga of Uganda. Phoenix Books, The University of Chicago.
- Entangazo ya Obusoga (2021-......) by Mr Kapata Alamanzan Jafar
