= Bugabula =

Hereditary chiefdom of Busoga and an administrative county in Kamuli District, Uganda

- Hereditary chiefdom (Busoga) and administrative county
- Interactive map of Bugabula
- Coordinates: 1°05′00″N 33°08′00″E
- Country: Uganda
- Region: Eastern Region
- District: Kamuli District
- Elevation: 1,062 m (3,484 ft)

Population (2024)
  - Total: 306,092
- Population figure refers to Bugabula County (administrative county).

Bugabula is one of the five traditional principalities of the kingdom of Busoga in Uganda. It is located in the Kamuli District.

It was founded around 1730 and became a part of the British protectorate in Busoga in 1896. Its current ruler is Gabula William Nadiope IV.

== History ==
Busoga was historically organised into hereditary chiefdoms. Bugabula is listed among the 11 chiefdoms referenced in accounts of the formation and evolution of the Kyabazingaship (the unifying leadership of Busoga).

During colonial administration, Bugabula appears in historical scholarship on Busoga’s local governance and administrative reorganisation. For example, research on Busoga’s ethnic formation discusses colonial-era appointments and offices in Bugabula (including references to sub-county leadership and Bugabula's court administration).

== Geography and administration ==
Bugabula County is in Kamuli District in Uganda’s Eastern Region. Sub-counties and town councils listed for Bugabula County in the 2024 census reporting include Balawoli, Bulopa, Butansi, Kagumba, Kitayunjwa, Nabwigulu, Namasagali, Namwendwa, and the town councils of Balawoli and Namwendwa.

Bugabula County (Kamuli District): selected 2024 census figures by sub-area
Sub-area	Status	Population (2024)
Balawoli	Subcounty	11,397
Balawoli	Town council	16,278
Bulopa	Subcounty	24,265
Butansi	Subcounty	34,323
Kagumba	Subcounty	45,448
Kitayunjwa	Subcounty	42,740
Nabwigulu	Subcounty	20,702
Namasagali	Subcounty	43,127
Namwendwa	Subcounty	45,412
Namwendwa	Town council	22,400
Total (Bugabula County)		306,092
Source: CityPopulation.de (compiled from Uganda Bureau of Statistics, National Population and Housing Census 2024).

== Demographics ==
Bugabula County's population was reported as 306,092 in the 2024 census reporting (reference date 10 May 2024). The same reporting lists 144,550 males and 161,542 females, and summarises age groups as 0–14 (142,751), 15–64 (152,672), and 65+ (10,669).

== Politics ==
In Uganda's parliamentary representation for Kamuli District, Bugabula is represented through constituencies titled Bugabula County North and Bugabula County South. The MPs listed for the 11th Parliament (2021–2026) include John Teira (Bugabula County North) and Henry Maurice Kibalya (Bugabula County South).

== Traditional leadership ==
Bugabula is associated with the office of the Gabula (the hereditary chief of Bugabula). Media reporting on Busoga's leadership notes Bugabula among Busoga's chiefdoms, and reports that Prince William Gabula Nadiope IV from Bugabula chiefdom in Kamuli District was installed as Kyabazinga of Busoga in September 2014 at Bugembe (Busoga Kingdom headquarters).

== See also ==
- Busoga
- Kamuli District
- Kyabazinga of Busoga
- Buyende District
- Buganda Kingdom
- Busoga kingdoms
