= Busiki =

Busiki Chiefdom Eisaaza lya Busiki
- Traditional Chiefdom
- Location of Namutumba District (historical Busiki) in Uganda
- Country: Uganda
- Region: Eastern Region
- Sub-region: Busoga
- Founded: c. 1683
- Joined British Protectorate: 1896

Government
  - Type: Hereditary Chiefdom
- Elevation: 1,119 m (3,671 ft)
- Time zone: UTC+3 (EAT)
- Part of the Busoga Kingdom

See also Namutumba District for Busiki District.

Busiki is one of the eleven traditional chiefdoms (also referred to as Masaza) of the Busoga Kingdom in Uganda. Its territory primarily corresponds to present-day Namutumba District, historically known as Busiki County, in the Busoga sub-region.

== History and establishment ==
It was founded around 1683 and became a part of the British protectorate in Busoga in 1896 during when the British were consolidating their control over the various semi-autonomous chiefdoms in the region. Its ruler is known as the Kisiki. Alongside other chiefdoms, Busiki was later federated to form the Kingdom of Busoga in 1906 under colonial administration.

== Geography and administrative evolution ==
Busiki corresponds closely with Namutumba District, which was part of Iganga District before its establishment in 2005. Namutumba District sometimes still referred to as "Busiki District" is the chief district corresponding to the historical boundaries of the Busiki chiefdom. The locality of Busiki lies just north of Namutumba town, and sits at an elevation of approximately 1,119 metres above sea level.

=== Traditional governance ===
The traditional ruler of Busiki holds the title Kisiki. The Kisiki of Busiki sits on the Busoga Royal Council, which brings together leaders from eleven chiefdoms and royal lineages in Busoga. Contemporary reporting on the Kyabazinga institution lists Busiki among the eleven chiefdoms whose leaders participate in Busoga’s leadership structure.

== Demographics ==
The 2014 National Population and Housing Census profile for Namutumba District reported a total population of 252,557 (123,911 males and 128,646 females) and 45,371 households.

In the same 2014 UBOS profile, Busiki County Constituency recorded a total population of 174,955 (85,642 males and 89,313 females) and 31,628 households.

== Economy and livelihoods ==
The district website identifies subsistence agriculture and animal husbandry as leading livelihood activities in Namutumba District, which overlaps the historic Busiki County area.

UBOS (2014) reported that in Namutumba District, 86.5% of households depended on subsistence farming as a main source of livelihood, 93.8% engaged in crop growing, and 68.9% engaged in livestock farming.

== Infrastructure and access to services ==
In Busiki County Constituency (2014), UBOS reported mobile phone ownership (age 10+) at 26.5% (28,807 persons). UBOS also reported access to electricity in Namutumba District at 6.5% of households (2014).

== Busoga chiefdoms ==
Busiki is among the chiefdoms represented in Busoga's Royal Council. Daily Monitor reporting also lists Busiki among the eleven chiefdoms, with the ruler title “Kisiki of Busiki”.

Chiefdoms represented in Busoga's Royal Council (selected titles)
Chiefdom	Ruler title
Bugabula	Gabula
Bulamogi	Zibondo
Kigulu	Ngobi
Bunya	Luba
Bugweri	Menhya
Bukooli	Wakooli
Butembe	Ntembe
Luuka	Tabingwa
Busiki	Kisiki
Bukono	Nkono
Bunhole	Nanhumba

== See also ==
- Busoga
- Kyabazinga of Busoga
- Namutumba District
- Busoga sub-region
