= Bulamogi =

Bulamogi is one of the five traditional principalities of the kingdom of Busoga in Uganda. It is located in the Kaliro District.

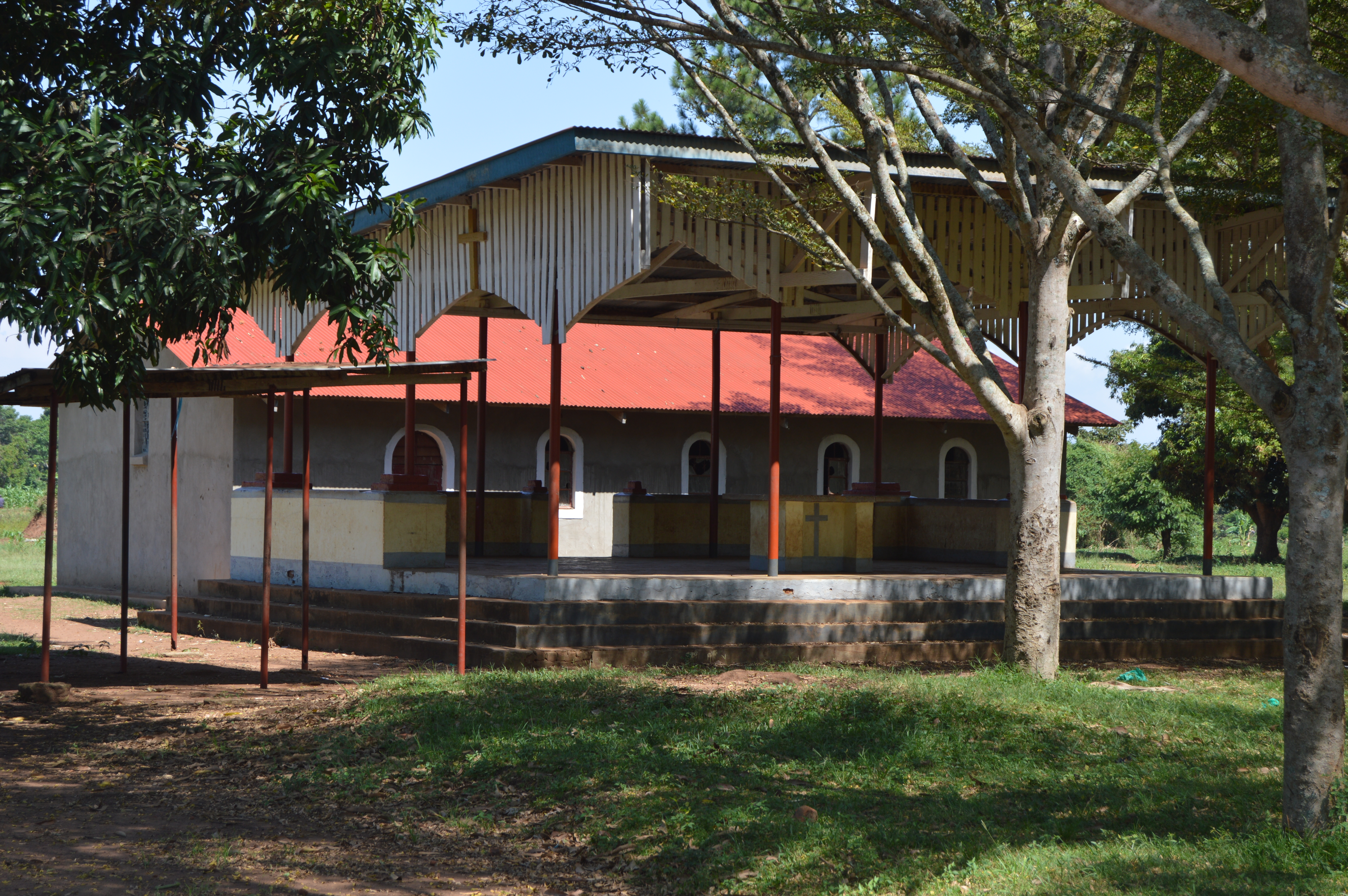
St Gonzaga Gonza shrine in Namugongo subcounty Bulamogi County.

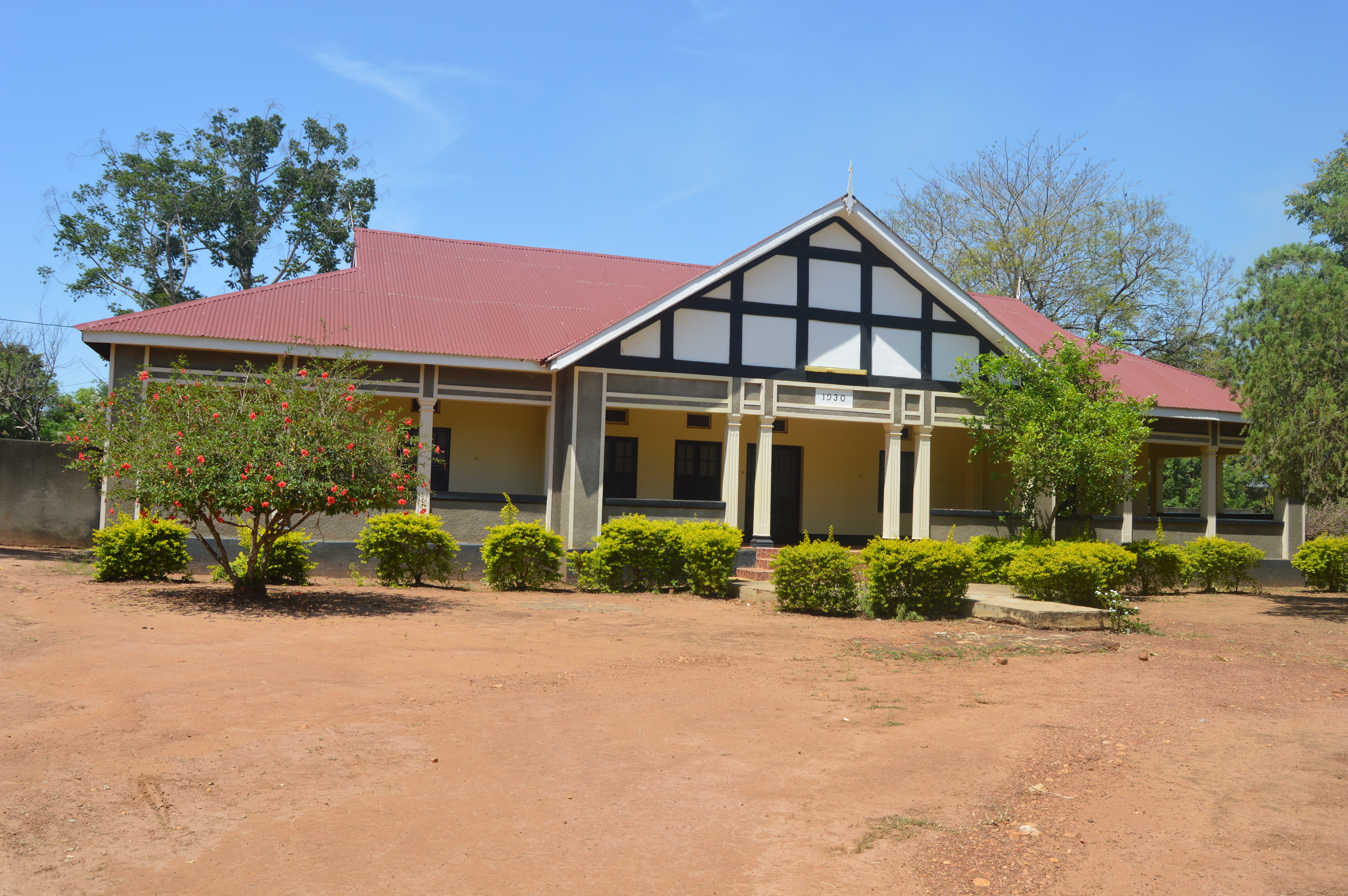
Wako Zibondos Mahomo ancestral palace, At Naigobya village, Gadumile in Bulamogi county, Busoga King, 1893 to 1952.( Palace and tombs of the late Zibondo)

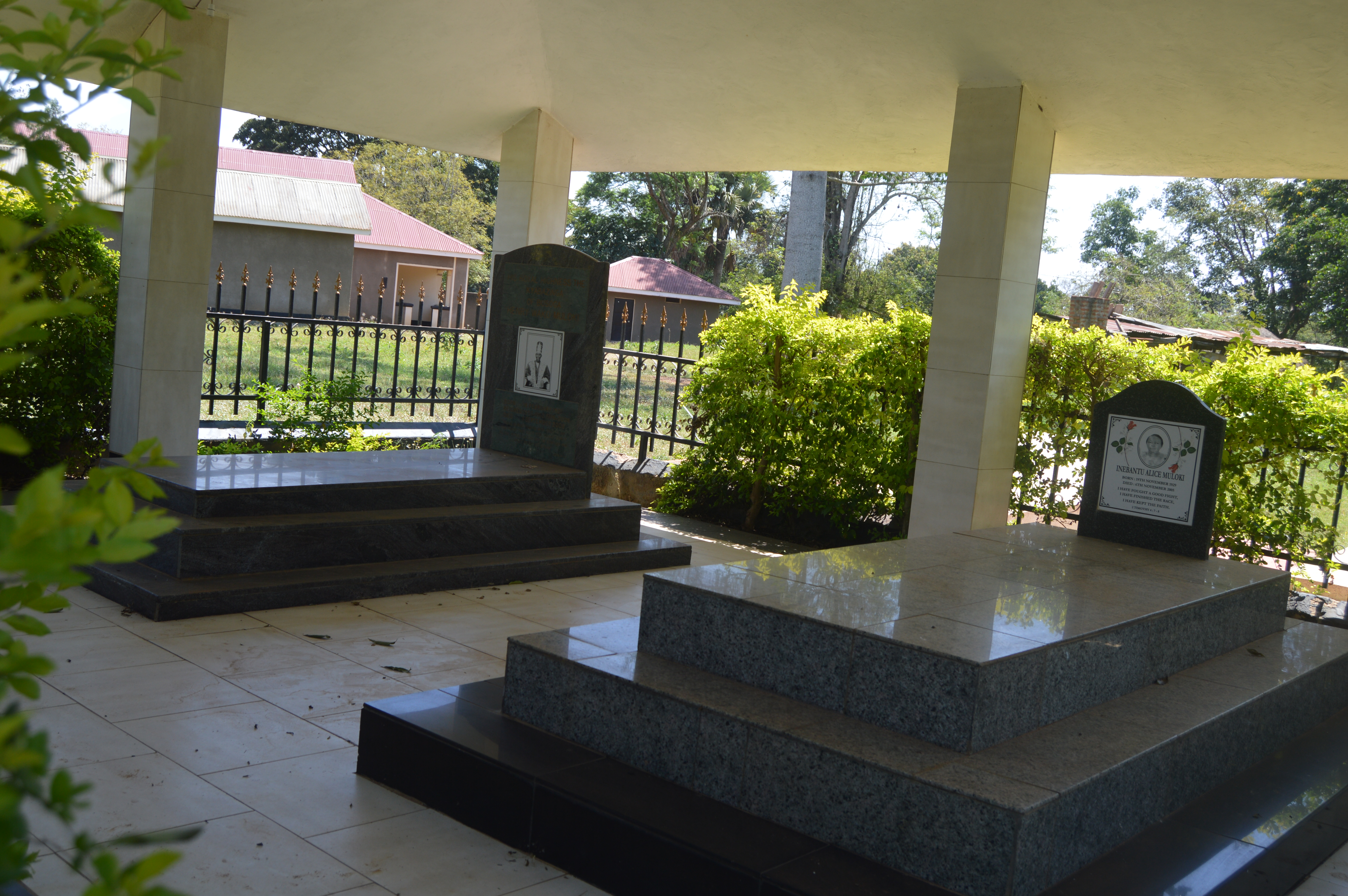
Wako Zibondos Mahomo ancestral palace.

Bulamogi was founded around 1550 by Zibondo Lamogi and became a part of the British protectorate in Busoga in 1896. Prior to this Bulamogi enjoyed elevated status among the chiefdoms of Busoga and its leaders ruled Busoga for two centuries. Leaders in Busoga paid homage and sacrifices to the zibondo (title for the leader of Bulamogi State) till toward the end of the 19th century when the leaders in Busoga officially appointed Kisira Ladaaga Wambuzi Zibondo X as the leader of the Busoga Confederation at Bukaleba in present-day Mayuge District.

Kisira Ludaaga Wambuzi Zibondo X was succeeded by his son Ezekiel T Waako Zibondo XI as the ruler of Busoga who took on the 1st title of Kyabazinga wa Busoga literally meaning King of Busoga. Ezekiel T Waako was succeeded by his son Henry Waako Muloki Zibondo XII (O.B.E) who ruled until his death and was succeeded by his son Edward C Wambuzi Zibondo XIII.

Bulamogi State has preserved the tombs of many of its kings who died as early as 1600 and is home to royal heritage and regalia.
