= Soga people =

Bantu ethnic group in eastern Uganda

Basoga
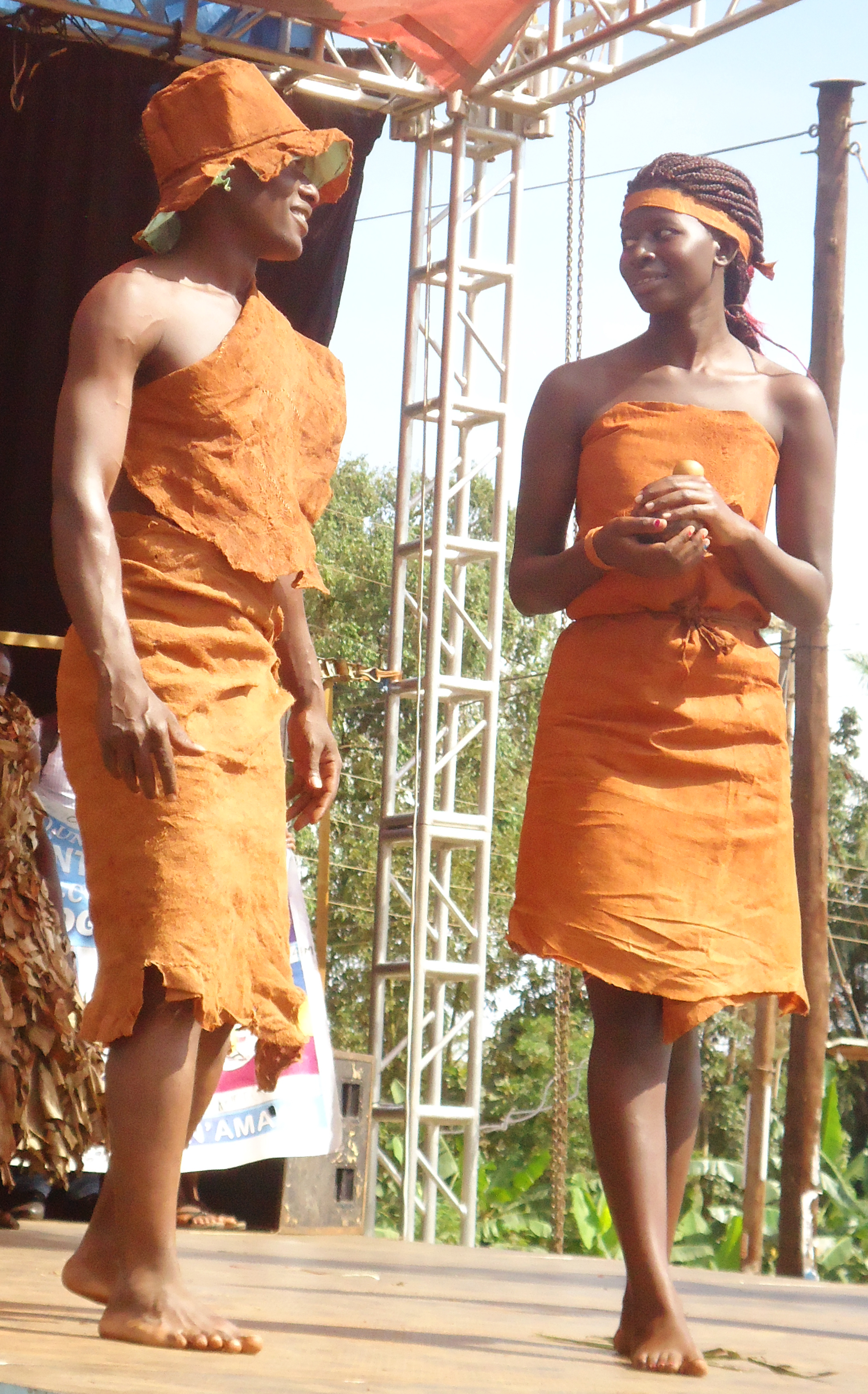

Total population
- 2,960,890

Regions with significant populations
- Uganda

Languages
- Soga language Olutenga, Olulamooji, Olusiki, Olukene

Religion
- Predominately Christianity and Traditional African religions, Minority Islam

Related ethnic groups
- Bagwere, Baganda and other Bantu peoples

- Person: OmuSoga
- People: AbaSoga
- Language: OluSoga( Olutenga,Olulamooji,Olusiki,Olukene.)
- Country: BuSoga

The Soga (also called Basoga) are a Bantu ethnic group native to the kingdom of Busoga in eastern Uganda. The Basoga live in Uganda's districts of Bugiri, Iganga, Jinja, Kamuli, and Mayuge (formerly known collectively as Busoga) though new districts were formed later like Luuka, Kaliro, Namayingo, Bugweri, Namutunba and Buyende. Situated in eastern Uganda immediately north of the equator, Busoga is bounded by Lake Kyoga to the north, the Victoria Nile to the west, the Mpologoma River to the east, and Lake Victoria to the south. Busoga is 8,920 square kilometres (3,443 square miles) in area, with a length of about 160 km (100 mi) and a width of a little over 80 km (50 mi). These natural boundaries have enabled Basoga to have a uniqueness of their own as a group.

== History ==
=== Early contact with European explorers ===
Busoga's written history began in 1862. On 28 July Royal Geographical Society explorer John Hanning Speke arrived at Ripon Falls (near Jinja, where the Victoria Nile flows from Lake Victoria and begins its descent to Egypt. Since Speke's route (inland from the East African coast) took him around the southern end of Lake Victoria, he approached Busoga from the west (through Buganda). Having reached his goal (the source of the Nile), he turned northward and followed the river downstream without exploring Busoga. He records, however, being told that Usoga (Swahili for Busoga) was an island (it is bordered on all four sides by water). According to the 2002 Census of Uganda, 16.2% of Basoga are Roman Catholic, 46.2% are Anglican (Church of Uganda), 30.6% are Muslim and 3.7% are Pentecostal.
