= Traditional monarchies in Uganda =

Map of the 17 officially recognised Kingdoms within Uganda. Areas without recognised Kingdoms in white

Though operating as a presidential republic on the national level, Uganda contains within its borders a number of traditional monarchies and cultural institutions which are officially recognised, supported and funded by the Ugandan national government. These monarchies are collectively referred to as Traditional or Cultural Institutions.

As of 2026 there are 17 officially recognised kingdoms, with a further 14 recognised chiefdoms existing autonomously within certain kingdoms.

The kingdoms operate as constitutional monarchies, each with a prime minister and cabinet subordinate to the monarch, and a parliament. As Uganda is a unitary state, the kingdoms do not have independent legislative competence or authority to make laws, being instead restricted to acting only on cultural and development matters. The kingdoms are distinct legal entities, operating their own institutions and budgets, with funding provided through grants by the Ugandan government, private donations, and revenue from assets such as land.

== History ==
The history of monarchy in modern-day Uganda stretches back centuries. The region was, according to legend, dominated by the Empire of Kitara from the 10th century, whose royal Chwezi dynasty is considered the ancestors of many of the current royal families in Uganda.

During the British colonial period, large parts of Uganda were ruled indirectly through the existing pre-colonial kingdoms, most notably Buganda. British administrators sought to extend this model of indirect rule by establishing kingdoms in traditionally decentralised parts of Uganda without established kingdoms, such as Lango and Teso. Uganda formally became a federation of these monarchies at independence in 1962, with each kingdom having autonomous self-government, and the ceremonial office of President of Uganda, the country’s head of state, intended to rotate among the country's traditional kings. Kabaka Mutesa II of Buganda was the only president under this constitution. Uganda's monarchies and the federal system were abolished by Prime Minister Milton Obote in 1967, following the Mengo coup, and Uganda was declared a republic.

The monarchies were formally restored by the government of Yoweri Museveni in 1993. The restored monarchies were however restricted to acting only as cultural institutions, without any political powers. Nationally, Uganda remained a republic. The framework for the formal recognition of traditional monarchical institutions in Uganda is established by Article 246 of the Ugandan constitution and the Institution of Traditional or Cultural Leaders Act, 2011. Since 1993, alongside the restoration of most monarchies which existed prior to 1967, a number of new kingdoms have been established in the parts of Uganda which previously did not have monarchical institutions.

== Officially recognised monarchies ==
Overview of recognised traditional kingdoms in Uganda
Name	Flag	Coat of Arms	Monarch	Prime Minister	Legislature	Established
Kingdom of Buganda			His Majesty the Kabaka; Muwenda Mutebi II	Katikkiro; Charles Mayiga	Lukiiko	13th century Abolished 1967; Restored 1993
Kingdom of Bunyoro-Kitara			His Majesty the Omukama; Solomon Iguru I	Omuhikirwa; Andrew Kirungi Byakutaga Ateenyi	Orukurato Orukuru	16th century Abolished 1967; Restored 1993
Kingdom of Tooro			His Majesty the Omukama; Nyabongo I	Omuhikirwa; Calvin Armstrong Rwomiire Akiiki	Orukurato Orukuru	1830; Abolished 1967; Restored 1993
Kingdom of Busoga			His Majesty the Kyabazinga; Nadiope IV	Katukiro; Joseph Muvawala Nsekere	Lukiiko	1939; Abolished 1967; Restored 1995
Alur Kingdom			His Majesty the Rwoth Ubimu; Philip Rauni III	Jadipu; Lawrence Opar Angala	Parliament	1390
Kingdom of Rwenzururu			His Majesty the Omusinga; Irema-Ngoma I	Omulerembera; Benson Kule Baritazale	Ekyaghanda	1962; Recognised 2008
Acholi Kingdom			His Royal Highness the Lawirwodi; David Acana II	Prime Minister; Michael Otim	Council of Chiefs	1950; Abolished 1967; Restored 1999
Lango Kingdom			His Royal Highness the Won Nyaci; Odongo Okune	Prime Minister; Willy Okullo	General Assembly	1960; Abolished 1967; Restored 2003
Teso Kingdom			His Royal Highness the Emorimor; Etomeileng III	Ekirigi; Andrew Ocole	Ariabet	1995
Adhola Kingdom			His Royal Highness the Kwar Adhola; Moses Stephen Owor	Jago; Obbo Richard Josel	Supreme Assembly	1999
Bugwere Kingdom			His Royal Highness the Ikumbania; Geoffrey Wayabire II (disputed); Kintu Mubbala (disputed)	Prime Minister; Moses Joel Mugulusi	Isimoola	2006
Bugisu Kingdom			His Royal Highness the Umukuuka; Mike Mudoma Umukuuka III	Prime Minister; Paul Mwambu	General Assembly	1963; Abolished 1967; Restored 2011
Samia-Bugwe Kingdom			His Royal Highness the Omwenengo; Nahaama III	Prime Minister; Arafat Barasa Egessa	Council of Elders	2017
Kumam Kingdom			His Royal Highness the Won Ateker; Raphael Otaya	Prime Minister; Samuel Eyenga	General Assembly	2023
Madi Kingdom			His Highness the Lopirigo; Simon Baru XI	Prime Minister; Amacha Goli	General Assembly	1962; Abolished 1967; Restored 2011
Lugbara Kingdom			His Highness the Agofe; Vacant	Epife; Ismail Tuku (disputed); Elly Ejiku Emo (disputed)	Langa	1962; Abolished 1967; Restored 1993
Bunyole Kingdom			His Highness the Sehulu; Elley Wesana Chomi	Prime Minister; Apollo Lydda	Oluhuje	2009

Overview of recognised chiefdoms within kingdoms
Name	Part of	Monarch	Prime Minister	Legislature	Established	Notes
Kooki Chiefdom	Buganda	His Royal Highness the Kamuswaga; Apollo Sansa Kabumbuli II	Prime Minister; Iddi Kiwanuka	Chiefdom Council	1740	Kooki declared itself a Kingdom independent of Buganda in 2015. Independence is not recognised by the Bugandan government. Officially recognised as an autonomous monarchy within Buganda.
Buruuli Chiefdom	Buganda	His Royal Highness the Isabaruli; Mwatyansozi I	Prime Minister; Samuel Kasirye		2004	Buruuli declared itself a Kingdom independent of Buganda in 2004. Independence is not recognised by the Bugandan government. Officially recognised as an autonomous monarchy within Buganda.
Bwamba Chiefdom	Rwenzururu	His Royal Highness the Omudhingiya; Ayongi Martin Kamya	Prime Minister; Charles Bukantwa	Kusei	2012	Bwamba declared itself a Kingdom independent of Rwenzururu in 2012. Independence is not recognised by the Rwenzururu government, which sees it as an autonomous monarchy within Rwenzururuy.
Principality of Bulamogi	Busoga	His Highness the Zibondo; Edward Wambuzi	Katuukiro; Samuel Babuli Mutono		1550	
Principality of Bugabula	Busoga	His Highness the Gabula; Nadiope IV	Katuukiro Ronald Nsaia Watongola		Before 1730	The reigning Gabula, Nadiope IV, also reigns as Kyabazinga of Busoga.
Principality of Kigulu	Busoga	His Highness the Ngobi; Izimba Gologolo	Katuukiro; Noah Wakabi		Before 1737	
Principality of Luuka	Busoga	His Highness the Tabingwa; Wellington Inhensiko IV	Katuukiro; Kaima Godfrey		Before 1737	
Principality of Bukono	Busoga	His Highness the Nkono; Godfrey Mutyaba	Katuukiro; Fred Kabakubya Elidad		1656	
Bukooli Chiefdom	Busoga	His Highness the Wakooli; David Muluuya Kawunye	Katuukiro; Kaawo Kawere Naay		Before 1737	
Butembe Chiefdom	Busoga	His Highness the Tabingwa; Waguba Ntembe Yasin	Katuukiro; Ivan Tibenkana		Before 1896	
Bugweri Chiefdom	Busoga	His Highness the Menha; Nkuutu Samuel Zirabamuzaale	Katuukiro; Godfrey Nabongo		1726	
Busiki Chiefdom	Busoga	His Highness the Kisiki; Nabongho Yololim	Katuukiro; Mulondo Kagoye Isabirye		1683	
Bunya Chiefdom	Busoga	His Highness the Luba; Geoffrey Mukajanga	Katuukiro; Jimmy Patrick Mudhungu		Before 1737	
Bunyole Chiefdom	Busoga	His Highness the Nanhumba; Nkwighe Bukumunhe			Before 1896	

== Former monarchies without recognition ==
Despite the restoration of monarchies in 1993, some of the former kingdoms have remained unrestored by the Ugandan government. The most prominent of these is Ankole, one of the 4 ancient pre-colonial kingdoms alongside Buganda, Bunyoro and Tooro. These monarchies have active claimants to the throne and movements advocating for formal restoration and recognition.

Overview of former kingdoms in Uganda
Name	Flag	Coat of Arms	Monarch (in pretence)	Prime Minister	Established	Abolished
Kingdom of Ankole			His Majesty the Omugabe; Charles Rwebishengye	Enganzi; William Katatumba	1478	1967
Sebei Kingdom			His Royal Highness the Kingoo; Ronald Chemonges III (disputed); Peter Swilikei (disputed)		1963	1967
