= Won Ateker of Kumam =

Title of the king of Kumam, Uganda

- Coat of Arms of Kumam

Incumbent
- Raphael Otaya since 7 July 2022

Details
- Style: His Royal Highness
- First monarch: Raphael Otaya
- Formation: 2022
- Website: kumamculturalheritage.org

The Won Ateker of Kumam (meaning roughly King of the Ateker in Kumam) is the constitutional monarch and paramount chief of the Kumam Kingdom, one of the 17 officially recognised traditional kingdoms in Uganda. The crown is elective for life. The current king, Raphael Otaya, is the first reigning Won Ateker, having taken the throne following Kumam's secession from Teso in 2022.

== Political power ==
Ugandan law prohibits the country's traditional monarchs from exercising political powers or being involved in partisan politics. As such, the powers of the Won Ateker and the Kumam government are restircted to cultural and development matters. However, as head of state of Kumam, the Won Ateker exercises significant power over the internal and cultural government of the Kumam people. He is responsible for appointing the Prime Minister of Kumam, as well as the other members of the Kumam cabinet.

The Won Ateker's appointments are scrutinised and vetted by the Council of Elders, who act as the Won Ateker's privy council. The council is also tasked with vetting candidates for the throne during a royal election.

== Style and title ==
The principal title of the monarch is Won Ateker, which represents their position as the sovereign and head of state of the Kumam Kingdom. Accompanying the title is the style of Royal Highness. The Won Ateker's secondary title is that of Papa me Kumam, meaning Father of the Kumam. This title represents the Won Ateker's position as the ultimate cultural leader and father figure of the Kumam people. The titles are often combined into one as Won Ateker Papa me Kumam.
