= Raphael Otaya =

King of the Kumam Kingdom since 2022

- Father of the Kumam

Won Ateker of Kumam
- Reign: 7 July 2022 – present
- Coronation: 31 May 2023
- Predecessor: Etomeileng III (as Emorimor of Teso)
- Born: 8 March 1957 (age 69); Katine, Soroti, Uganda
- Spouse: Jane Akulo
- Issue: 9
- Religion: Christian

Raphael Otaya (born 8 March 1957) is the reigning Won Ateker (king) of Kumam in Uganda. He is the first occupant of the Kumam throne, having been elected to rule over the Kumam people in 2022 following their formal separation from the Teso Kingdom.

== Life and family ==
Otaya was born on 8 March 1957 in the village of Olel in the Katine sub-county within Uganda's Soroti District. He worked as a teacher from the 1970s. In 1988 he became head of the science department of the Soroti Teacher Training College, before becoming Head Teacher in 1996, a post he held until 2004. He subsequently became chairman of the Soroti school board

He is married to Jane Akulo, with whom he has 9 children.

=== Reign ===
From its establishment in 1995, the Kumam people and the territories they inhabitet were part of the Teso Kingdom. By 2011, a movement had emerged in favour of Kumam separation from Teso. Otaya was part of the group of elders advocating for separation in faovur of establishing a separate monarchy for the Kumam people.

On 7 July 2022, following many years of agitation and failed attempts, Kumam seceded from Teso, with Otaya elected the first Won Ateker at a meeting of hundreds of prominent people of the Kumam community. Otaya was subsequently crowned on 31 Mai 2023, with the Ugandan government formally recognising his rule on 1 August 2023.
