= Bunyole Kingdom =

Traditional kingdom in Uganda

Kingdom of Bunyole Obwa Sehulu bwa Bunyole (Lunyole)
- Flag Coat of arms

- Location of the Bunyole Kingdom (Red) in Uganda (White)
- Status: Traditional kingdom
- Capital: Butaleja
- Official languages: Lunyole, English
- Ethnic groups: Banyole
- Demonyms: Munyole (singular); Abanyole (plural)
- Government: Constitutional monarchy
  - Monarch: Elley Wesana Chomi
  - Prime Minister: Apollo Lydda
- Legislature: Oluhuje

Establishment
  - Established: 2009

Area
  - Total: 655 km^{2} (253 sq mi)

Population
  - 2024 census: 312,771
  - Density: 477.5/km^{2} (1,236.7/sq mi)
- Currency: Ugandan shilling
- Time zone: UTC+3
- Calling code: 256

The Kingdom of Bunyole is one of the 17 officially recognised traditional kingdoms in Uganda. Located in south-eastern Uganda, within the historic Bukedi region, its territory is coterminous with the Butaleja District. The kingdom is the home of the Banyole people, though a significant Banyole population can also be found within the Bunyole Chiefdom in neighbouring Busoga. The Banyole constitute roughly 1.4% of Uganda's total population.

Ugandan law defines the kingdom as a traditional cultural institution, which is prohibited from exercising political power. The task of the institution is to promote tradition, popular participation and unity among the people of the region. The kingdom government, through grants from the Ugandan government, private donations and partnerships with civil organisations, operates development programs and initiativesto improve the standard of living for the Banyole.

== History ==
The Banyole are belived to have come to Uganda as part of the early Bantu migrations from western Kenya. The Banyole during this period did not develop a centralised kingdom or system of government, instead being governed by a decentralised clan structure, with each clan headed by an Omutuusa (chief).

The Banyole, alongside neighbouring groups like the Bagwere, Bagwe and Jopadhola, were brought under British colonial rule at the end of the 19th century, with Banyole territories being integrated into the Bukedi district.

Uganda's independence in 1962 ushered in a federal system of government and a wish to equalise the districts with the established kingdoms of Buganda, Bunyoro, Ankole and Tooro. As such, a monarchical office for multi-ethnic Bukedi, that of Senkulu was created. The Bukedi monarchy was short-lived, being abolished alongside Uganda's other monarchies in 1967 following the Mengo Crisis.

The 1993 restoration of monarchies by the government of Yoweri Museveni did not revive the throne of the Senkulu, with the differing ethnic groups in Bukedi instead establishing their own monarchies, such as the Adhola Kingdom and the Bugwere Kingdom. By 2009 a movement to establish a monarchy for the Banyole had come about and a new monarchical office, that of Sehulu, was established. Subsequent disputes over who was to assume the throne lead to disorganisation in the movement and the Ugandan government not formally recognising the kingdom.

A constitution for the kingdom was promulgated in 2018, and the next year Elley Wesana Chomi was elected the first substantive Sehulu by a council of Banyole elders. Continued disputes over the throne from certain factions, however, continued to prevent the Ugandan government from recognising the monarchy.

In 2026, the Ugandan government finally announced its formal recognition of the Bunyole Kingdom, authorising the coronation of Elley Wesana Chomi to go ahead.

== Government ==
Bunyole is a constitutional monarchy, with supreme executive and cultural powers vested in the Sehulu, but exercised in accordance with the 2018 Bunyole constitution. The Sehulu is an elective monarch and is chosen for life by and from the clan elders. The head of government of the kingdom is the Prime Minister, who is appointed by the Sehulu to head the cabinet of ministers.

Legislative power in Bunyole is vested in the Oluhuje, also known as the House of Representatives, a 75-member assembly which represents a broad base of the Banyole community. Its membership includes among others elected representatives, elders, youth representatives, farmers and businessmen.
