= Jago of Padhola =

- Coat of Arms of Padhola

- Flag of Padhola
- Incumbent; Obbo Richard Josel since 1 May 2017
- Style: The Right Honourable
- Appointer: The Kwar Adhola
- Term length: At His Royal Highness' pleasure

The Jago of Padhola is the head of government of the Adhola Kingdom, one of the traditional kingdoms within Uganda. The Jago, who is also referred to as prime minister, is subordinate to and appointed by the Adhola monarch, the Kwar Adhola. The Jago chairs the Adhola cabinet of minister and exercises the day-to-day governance of the kingdom.

As head of government, the Jago is an ex-officio member of both the Supreme Assembly, the kingdom's legislature, and of the Council of Clan Leaders, the monarch's advisory council. As Padhola operates under a parliamentary system, the Jago is required to maintain the confidence of the supreme assembly to remain in office, and may be removed from office by a vote of no confidence.
