= Supreme Assembly of Padhola =

- Coat of Arms of Padhola

Type
- Type: Unicameral

Leadership
- Monarch: Moses Stephen Owor
- Speaker: Ochwo Demba

Structure
- Seats: 225
- Political groups: His Royal Highness's Government (17): Jago and Ministers (17); Territorial representatives (208): Elected members (156); Clan Chiefs (52); Presiding Officer: Speaker (1)

Elections
- Voting system: Election and Appointment by the Kwar Adhola

Meeting place
- Tororo, Uganda

The Supreme Assembly of Padhola is the legislature of the Adhola Kingdom, one of the seventeen officially recognised traditional kingdoms in Uganda. It is defined by the Adhola constitution's chapter 5 article 1 as the "supreme legislature, policy maker and general meeting" of the kingdom.

Formed upon the establishment of the Adhola Kingdom in 1999, the supreme assembly consits of the monarch, the prime minister and 16 other members of the cabinet, the 52 hereditary chiefs of the Adhola clans, and 3 elected representatives from each clan. The assembly is charged with legislating by-laws, legislating on cultural matters, scrutinising the royal government and passing the kingdom's yearly budget. As a cultural legislature, it is prevented from legislating on political matters.

The Adhola cabinet is jointly responsible to both the monarch and the supreme assembly. As such, the cabinet must maintain the confidence of the assembly to remain in office, and may be removed by a vote of no confidence.
