= Bunyole =

Bunyole may refer to:

- Bunyole Kingdom, a traditional kingdom of Uganda
- Bunyole Chiefdom, a chiefdom within the Kingdom of Busoga
- Bunyole people, or Banyole, a Bantu ethnic group, native to the Bunyole Kingdom
