= Orukurato Orukuru =

Orukurato Orukuru may refer to:

- Orukurato Orukuru (Bunyoro), the parliament of the Kingdom of Bunyoro-Kitara
- Orukurato Orukuru (Tooro), the parliament of the Kingdom of Tooro
