= Northern Ugandan Social Action Fund =

The Northern Uganda Social Action Fund (NUSAF) is a government organization in Uganda with $100 million of funding from the World Bank. The goal of NUSAF is to help local communities in the 18 districts of northern Uganda that have been ravaged by conflict over the last 20 years. This money is given directly to members of the community so they can invest in infrastructure and training for long-term development. Labora Farms in Acholiland is a principal example of NUSAF's projects in Uganda.
