= Kumam Kingdom =

Traditional kingdom in Uganda

Kingdom of Kumam Etok me Kumam (Kumam)
- Flag Coat of arms
- Motto: Gwooko Etok me Kumam (Kumam); "Defend the Kingdom of Kumam"
- Anthem: Honour the King, Father of Kumam (English: "Oworunu Won Ateker Papa Kumam")
- Location of Kumam Kingdom (red) in Uganda (White)
- Status: Traditional kingdom
- Capital: Kaberamaido
- Official languages: Kumam, English
- Ethnic groups: Kumam
- Demonym: Kumam
- Government: Constitutional monarchy
  - Monarch: Raphael Otaya
  - Prime Minister: Samuel Eyenga
- Legislature: General Assembly

Establishment
  - Established: 7 July 2022
  - Separation from Teso recognised: 1 August 2023

Area
  - Total: 1,788.5 km^{2} (690.5 sq mi)

Population
  - 2024 census: 290,722
  - Density: 162.55/km^{2} (421.0/sq mi)
- Currency: Ugandan shilling
- Time zone: UTC+3
- Calling code: 256

The Kingdom of Kumam, also known as Kumamland, is one of the 17 officially recognised traditional kingdoms in Uganda. Located in central Uganda, the kingdom is the home of the Kumam people, who constitute roughly 0.8% of Uganda's total populaiton. The Kumam are ruled by the Won Ateker, who is the paramount chief of the Kumam clans.

Ugandan law defines the Kumam kingdom as a cultural institution. This leaves it without political power, with its role being to promote and protect tradition, popular participation and unity among the people of Kumam region. The Kumam government, through grants from the Ugandan government and private donations, operates development programs and institutions to improve the standard of living for the people within its borders.

== History ==
The Kumam migrated from modern-day Ethiopia to the shores of Lake Kyoga during the early 17th century. Their migration took place alongside the other Ateker peoples, like the Iteso and Lango.

The Kumam community have historically been closely linked with the neighbouring Iteso. In 1995, the Kumam participated in the formation of the Teso Kingdom, becoming one of the kingdom's constituent parts. By 2011 a feeling of alienation from and dissatisfaction with the Iteso government, as well as a fear that the Kumam culture was dying out, gave rise to a Kumam secessionist movemen. This movement aimed for independence from Teso and the formation of a separate Kumam kingdom within Uganda.

Following multiple years of agitation and organisation, and multiple failed attempts at secession, the Kumam Kingdom was officially proclaimed separate from Teso on 7 July 2022, when Raphael Otaya was elected Won Ateker. Kumam's secession was subsequently recognised by the Ugandan government on 1 August 2023.

Post-secession Teso-Kumam relations have remained cordial, with the Emorimor of Teso conducting an official visit to Kumam in October 2024.

== Government ==
The Won Ateker is the sovereign and paramount chief of Kumam, which is governed as a constitutional monarchy. Originally intended to reign for a 10-year term, constitutional amendments shortly after the kingdom's establishment transitioned the crown into a lifetime position. The Won Ateker is assisted in the government of the kingdom by the Prime Minister and the other ministers whom he appoints.

The Council of Elders is the Won Ateker's privy council. Consisting of 15 experienced elders from across the Kumam community, the council is tasked with vetting and approving candidates for ministerial office, as well as candidates for the Kumam throne during a royal election.

The supreme decision-making body and legislature of Kumam is the General Assembly. The assembly consists of clan heads, women's representatives, representatives of youth, and representatives of the disabled community.
