= Lugbara Kari =

Traditional kingdom in Uganda

Lugbara Kingdom Lugbara Kari
- Flag Coat of arms
- Motto: Adro le Lugbara tu (Lugbara); "God loves the Lugbara very much"
- Anthem: We are one Lugbara people (English: "Ama 'ba aluni Lugbara ru")
- Location of Lugbara Kari (maroon) in Uganda (khaki)
- Status: Traditional kingdom
- Capital: Arua
- Official languages: Lugbarati, English
- Ethnic groups: Lugbara
- Demonym: Lugbara
- Government: Constitutional monarchy
  - Monarch: Vacant
  - Prime Minister: Ismail Tuku (disputed); Elly Ejiku Emo (disputed)
- Legislature: Langa

Establishment
  - Established: 7 July 2022
  - Separation from Teso recognised: 1 August 2023

Area
  - Total: 7,215 km^{2} (2,786 sq mi)

Population
  - 2024 census: 2,225,694
  - Density: 308.48/km^{2} (799.0/sq mi)
- Currency: Ugandan shilling
- Time zone: UTC+3
- Calling code: 256

The Lugbara Kingdom, formally known as Lugbara Kari (meaning House of Lugbara), is one of the 17 officially recognised traditional kingdoms in Uganda. Located in north-western Uganda, on the border with the Democratic Republic of the Congo and South Sudan, the kingdom is the home of the Lugbara people, who constitute roughly 2.7% of Uganda's total populaiton. Lugbara Kari describes itself as the traditional and cultural institution of all Lugbara people on Earth, and is headed by the Agofe. As such, Lugbara Kari also claims cultural authority and governance over the Lugbara people living in neighbouring South Sudan and DR Congo.

Ugandan law defines the Lugbara kingdom as a cultural institution. This leaves it without political power, with its role being to promote and protect tradition, popular participation and unity among the Lugbara people. Through grants from the Ugandan government and private donations, Lugbara Kari operates development programs and institutions to improve the standard of living for the Lugbara people.

== History ==
The Lugbara people migrated to present-day northern Uganda between the 14th and 16th centuries. During the Scramble for Africa, Lugbara territories became part of the Congo Free State's Lado Enclave in 1894 with the signing of the British-Congolese Treaty. The territory would be transferred to British administration and integrated into the Uganda Protectorate in 1914. During this period, the Lugbara homelands were integrated into the multi-ethnic West Nile District.

In 1922 the office of Agofe Obim was established as a paramount chief for all West Nile. The office was given to Jalwere Jalasiga, an Alur prince. Upon Ugandan independence in 1962 brought an end to the West Nile-wide chieftaincy, with the Alur reassering their kingdom, and Madi being administratively separated. Jalasiga during this process yielded the office of Agofe Obim to Mariko Boroa. Obim was removed from the title, and the Agofe became a position specifically of Lugbara leadership.

The Agofe and the other monarchical institutions of Uganda were abolished in 1967; the 1995 Constitution of Uganda helped revive them. Lugbara Kari started rebuilding by establishing interim county chiefs answerable to the restored Agofe. The 3rd Agofe of Lugbara Kari was educationist Jason Avutia who was crowned upon the monarchy's restoration in 1993. He reigned until his death in 2023 and was succeeded by Manase Yuma Amuku. In 2025, the Lugbara cabinet under Prime Minister Ismail Tuku announced Yuma's deposition and replaced him with Angelo Pati, the County Chief of Maracha, as the 5th Agofe. Yuma refused to accept his dethronement, which was contrary to the Lugbara constitution, and appointed Elly Ejiku Emo as PM, thereby splitting Lugbara into two rival governments. Yuma passed away in October 2026, leaving the throne vacant, as Angelo Pati remains unrecognised by the Ugandan government.

== Structure ==
A constitutional monarchy, Lugbara Kari operates under a codified constitution which establishes how the kingdom is governed.

The Agofe is the monarch and paramount chief of the Lugbara and serves as a mostly ceremonial unifying figure. Executive power is vested in the Epife, also known as the prime minister. The prime minister is appointed by the Agofe, and thereupon chooses the ministers of the cabinet.

Legislative authority is vested in the Langa, also known as Parliament. the Langa consists of 10 representatives from each of the 4 Lugbara sub-tribes. Each sub-tribe is represented in the Langa by their chief and 9 elected representatives.

Administratively, Lugbara Kari has county chiefs who answer to the elected Paramount Chief; each chief (from Ayivu, Maracha, Terego, Vurra, Aringa, Madi, Kebu, etc) is a potential future agofe. Functions and objectives of Lugbara Kari include enhancing cooperation among Lugbara and promoting heritage and the Lugbara language. Under the motto "Adro le Lugbara tu", which translates as God loves the Lugbara very much, Lugbara Kari uses a leopard as an emblem. It's also the identity of the Kari's capital.
