= Madi Kingdom =

Traditional kingdom in Uganda

Madi Kingdom Opi Maʼdi Dri i (Maʼdi)
- Flag Emblem
- Motto: Ama Alu (Ma'di); "We are One"
- Anthem: Omba alu’ (English: "We stand together")
- Location of the Madi Kingdom (red) in Uganda (white)
- Status: Traditional kingdom
- Capital: Moyo
- Official languages: Maʼdi
- Ethnic groups: Madi
- Demonym: Madi
- Government: Constitutional monarchy
  - Monarch: Simon Baru XI
  - Prime Minister: Amacha Goli
- Legislature: General Assembly

Establishment
  - Established: 1962
  - Abolished: 1967
  - Restored: 2011

Area
  - Total: 4,864 km^{2} (1,878 sq mi)

Population
  - 2024 census: 553,145
  - Density: 113.7/km^{2} (294.5/sq mi)
- Currency: Ugandan shilling
- Time zone: UTC+3
- Calling code: 256

The Madi Kingdom is one of the 17 officially recognised and gazetted traditional kingdoms in Uganda. Located in northern Uganda between Acholiland and Lugbara, the kingdom is coterminous with the Madi sub-region. It is the home of the Madi people, who make up approximately 0.9% of Uganda's total populaiton, the vast majority living within the kingdom's borders.

Under Ugandan law, Madi is recognised as a purely cultural institution without political power. The Madi government's powers are limited to tasks such as promoting and protecting Madi tradition, cultural autonomy, popular participation in civil society, community development and fostering unity among the people of the region. Via grants from the Ugandan central government and private donations, the Madi government operates development programs and institutions to improve the standard of living of the region's population.

== History ==
The Madi people are belived to have migrated to the Nile Basin in northern Uganda from their original home in the Omo valley in southern Ethiopia sometime around the 6th century BC. Madi society subsequently organised

During the Scramble for Africa, Madi territories became part of the Congo Free State's Lado Enclave in 1894 with the signing of the British-Congolese Treaty. The territory would later be transferred to British administration, being integrated into the Uganda Protectorate in 1914. During colonial rule, Madiland was integrated into the multi-ethnic West Nile District.

At independence in 1962, Madi was administratively separated from West Nile and became its own district. This facilitated the establishment of a Madi monarchy under the provisions of Uganda's 1962 constitution. The first Lopirigo of Madi, Izama Angelo, was thereafter crowned. The Madi monarchy was however abolished by the government of Milton Obote in 1967, alongside all other Ugandan monarchies, following the Mengo crisis.

The Madi people subsequently suffered persecution and repression from the regime of Idi Amin, who was a member of the related Kakwa people.

The monarchies of Uganda were restored by the Museveni government in 1993. It was not, however, until 2011 that the Madi monarchy was revived, with the election of Drani Stephen Izakare, a nephew of Izama Angelo, as the new Lopirigo. In 2022, the monarchy was provided with 100 million Ugandan shillings by the government to facilitate negotiations with the neighbouring Acholi Kingdom over a land dispute.

Following a constitutional convention, a written constitution for the kingdom was adopted in 2023. Lopirigo Drani Stephen Izakare was subsequently dethroned after being charged with seven counts of attempted murder. An election to select a new Lopirigo was held on 23 August 2024, with Simon Baru XI, chief of the Pakile clan, being elected by a vote of 11 to 10 among the 21 chiefs eligible to vote.

== Government ==
Madi is governed as a constitutional monarchy, operating in accordance with the provisions of its 2023 constitution. The Lopirigo is the kingdom's head, being defined in the constitution as a symbol of "unity, love and peace", and the chief custodian and mediator of the kingdom's institutions and of Madi cultural practices.

Executive power is vested in the Lopirigo and exercised on his behalf by the Prime Minister. The prime minister, who heads the executive committee, is appointed by the Lopirigo, with the approval of the General Assembly. The prime minister holds office for a 5-year term, renewable once, and may be removed from office by a two-thirds majority vote of the assembly. The Lopirigo additionally holds the authority to dismiss the prime minister at any time.

The General Assembly is the legislature of the kingdom, tasked with making laws for the "peace, order and good government" of Madi. The assembly consists of the 26 clan chiefs and 15 elected representatives, 5 from each district in the kingdom. In addition to the general assembly, there exists a Council of Elders, which operates as an advisory body to the Lopirigo. It consists of 9 elders, three from each district of the Madi sub-region.
