= Apio Moro =

Ugandan musician

- Born: Tororo District
- Occupation: musician

Lilian Apio, commonly known by many as Apio Moro is a Ugandan musician who has been writing and singing Afro-soul music in her mother tongue (Japadhola) with the touch of English and Luganda, telling stories from her experiences through the journey of life. Music in Africa has described her music as having "a touch of hip-hop, RnB, Soul, and a little rock".

== Background ==
She was born to artistic parents in the teaching profession and raised in Tororo District.

== Career ==
In 2015, she took part in Urban TV's Coca-Cola Rated Next, a talent search contest. With Sima Sabiti, Benon Mugumbya and Sharpe Ssewali who were the three judges.

Her limited knowledge of Luganda (language widely spoken in Uganda), affected her performance as most of the songs chosen for them to sing were in luganda hence it was to her disadvantage.

Apio has been around the industry, however, participating in musical contests, joining a famous girl group before finally going solo.

In 2017, she performed on Suzan Kerunen's Pearl Rhythm Stage Coach activations or Coutinho Kemiyondo's Aka Dope. This was the same period that she launched an EP titled “Chuny Adech” which simply means Half my Soul, where she performed most of the songs on her first album “Chuny”.

She also collaborated with Multi-Grammy award winner Joss Stone during her Uganda stop of the "Joss Stone Total World Tour" on one of Apio's songs “Pariye”.

Apio has gone on to perform in Kigali and Nairobi at The Music Weekender.

In March 2019, Apio launched her new album “Choore” (Move Closer) with a listening party at The Square to celebrate her re-discovered self. “Choore” features 8 tracks in a mixture of Japadhola, English, Luganda, and Kinyarwanda and was produced by Vincent Othieno based in Washington D.C.

In May 2019, Apio performed at DOADOA East African Performing Arts Market.

== Personal life ==
Apio Lilian Moro became pregnant in late 2025. She expects the baby in August 2026.

== Songs ==
=== Chuny Adech Album ===
1. Kiisa
2. Atiya
3. Slave
4. Obia

=== Choore Album ===
1. Yik’an
2. Ajok
3. Pariye
4. Kod'an
5. Bayi
6. Ndi Mukyala
7. Onduuri
8. Parasite
