= Omuhikirwa of Bunyoro =

Omuhikirwa of Bunyoro-Kitara
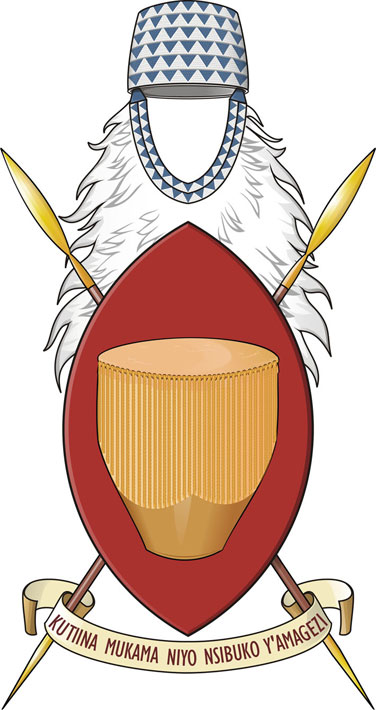
- Coat of arms of Bunyoro-Kitara

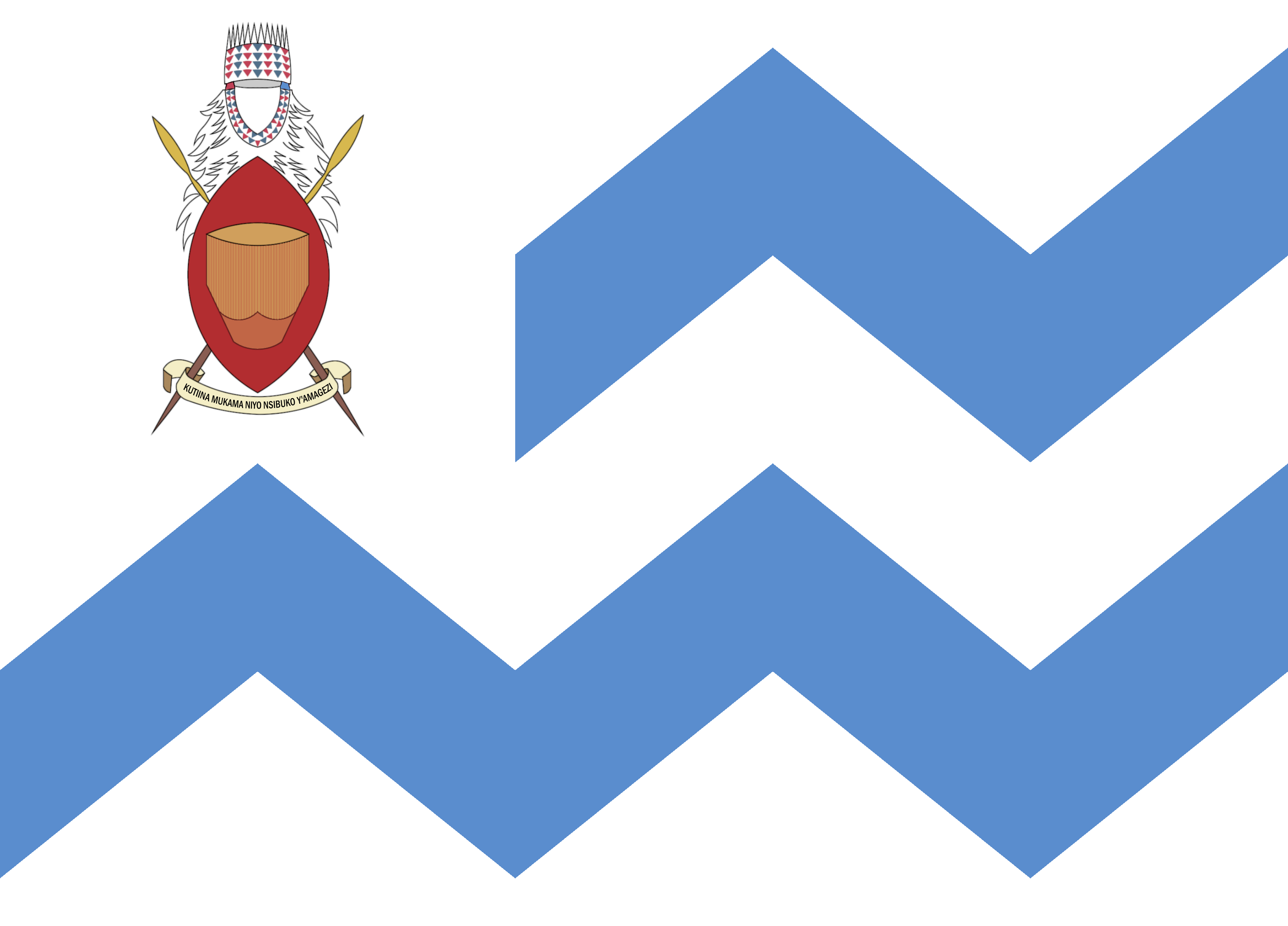
- Flag of Bunyoro-Kitara
- Incumbent; Andrew Kirungi Byakutaga Ateenyi since 15 January 2018
- Style: The Right Honourable
- Appointer: The Omukama
- Term length: At His Majesty's pleasure

The Omuhikirwa is the prime minister of the Kingdom of Bunyoro-Kitara, one of the traditional kingdoms within Uganda. The Omuhikirwa is subordinate to and appointed by the monarch of Bunyoro, the Omukama. The Omuhikirwa chair's the Banyoro cabinet of ministers, exercises the day-to-day governance of the kingdom, and acts as a spokesman for the Omukama. As head of government, the Omuhikirwa is an ex-offico member of the Orukurato Orukuru, the kingdom's parliament.

The earliest record of a Prime Minister of Bunyoro dates back to 1898. The office was originally styled as Kattikiro. Upon Uganda's independence in 1962 the office was restyled as Omuhikirwa, though the title Kattikiro continues to be used occasionally.

The current Omuhikirwa is Andrew Kirungi Byakutaga Ateenyi, who was appointed by King Solomon Iguru I on 15 January 2018. Byakutanga's term of office has been disputed since 2022, and members of the Royal House have called for his resignation.

== List of Omuhikirwa ==
- 1898–1912: Paulo Byabacwezi
- 1917–1939: Petero Bikunya
- 1939–1947: Petero Nyangabyaki
- 1947–1952: Balamu Jaberi Mukasa
- 1952–1956: Martin D. Mukidi
- 1956–1962: Zakayo Hairoroa Kwebiha
- 1962–1967: Metusera Tibigambwa Katuramu
- 1967–1994: Post abolished
- 1994–1999: Yolamu R. Barongo
- 1999–2001: Israel Kamanyire Ndahura
- 2001–2002: Leonard Kitaribara
- 2002–2006: Erisa Kagoro Byenkya
- 2006–2009: Emmanuel Aliba Kiiza
- 2009–2012: Yabezi Kiiza
- 2012: Bonny Kyaligonza
- 2012–2015: Jackson Kasozi Nsamba
- 2015–2018: Norman Lukumu
- 2018–present: Andrew Kirungi Byakutaga Ateenyi
