= Katine =

Ugandan sub-county

Coordinates: 1°51′N 33°29′E

Soroti District

Katine is a sub-county in the Soroti District of Uganda. It contains 66 villages, one of which is also called Katine.

Since October 2007, the sub-county has been the focus of a three-year aid programme, undertaken by AMREF, with funding from Barclays Bank and donations from readers of The Guardian newspaper, which is tracking the project. AMREF's Katine Community Partnerships Project is aiming to improve living conditions, working across five key components: water, health, education, livelihoods and governance. The NGO Farm Africa is helping with the livelihoods component, and in 2016 embarked on a new project to help the Katine farming cooperative sell their produce in high-value regional markets. Much of the publicity surrounding the project focuses on the village but it is the entire sub-county that is the target of the project. The Guardian newspaper returned to Katine in December 2015 to report on the progress made.

== See also ==
- Kotido
- Kotido Airport
