= Epife of Lugbara =

Head of government of the Lugbara Kingdom

Epife of Lugbara Kari
- Coat of Arms of Lugbara

- Flag of Lugbara
- Incumbent; Disputed between Ismail Tuku and Elly Ejiku Emo
- Style: The Right Honourable
- Appointer: The Agofe
- Term length: At His Highness' pleasure

The Epife of Lugbara Kari, constitutionally referred to as the Prime Minister, is the head of government of the Lugbara Kingdom, one of the traditional kingdoms within Uganda. The Epife is the chief executive of the kingdom and chairs the cabinet, with responsibility for leading the kingdom's administration, signing all official documents, and being the chief spokesperson of the government. The Epife is appointed by the Agofe, Lugbara Kari's head of state.

The office is currently disputed as part of the wider Lugbara constitutional crisis triggered by the attempt to dethrone Agofe Manase Yuma Amuku IV in 2025. Since then, Ismail Tuku and Elly Ejiku Emo have headed rival cabinets.
