= Sehulu of Bunyole =

Title of the king of Madi, Uganda

- Coat of arms of the Bunyole Kingdom

Incumbent
- Elley Wesana Chomi since 22 September 2019

Details
- Style: His Highness
- First monarch: Dauson Mauta
- Formation: 2009

The Sehulu of Bunyole is the traditional ruler of the Bunyole Kingdom in south-eastern Uganda. The Sehulu serves as the unifying cultural and traditional leader of the Banyole people. The crown is elective, being elected for life by the elders of the Banyole clans.

== History ==
The Banyole people have traditionally not had a centralised monarchy, instead being divided into numerous clans, each headed by an Omutuusa. Ugandan independence in 1962 brought about the first instance of monarchy for the Banyole when the Bukedi district, of which Bunyole was a part, was granted its own constitutiona head, the Senkulu of Bukedi. The office of Senkulu was however short-lived, being abolished upon the proclamation of the Ugandan republic in 1967.

Unlike other monarchs, the Senkulu was not restored upon Yoweri Museveni's restoration of monarchies in 1993. Instead, the multi-ethnic Bukedi region developed multiple monarchies, such as that of the Jopadhola and Bagwere. This gave rise in 2009 to a Banyole monarchist movement, with clan elders and local politicians creating the title Sehulu of Bunyole to act as a cultural monarch for the Banyole people, with Dauson Mauta proclaimed interim Sehulu.

Following 10 years of disputes over the throne, which hampered the movement, Elley Wesana Chomi was elected Sehulu in 2019. Further disputes would delay Chomi's coronation and official government recognition further, until the Ugandan government announced its recognition of the Bunyole Kingdom in 2026.

== Powers ==
Ugandan law prohibits traditional monarchs from exercising political powers or being involved in politics. As such, the Sehulu's powers and those of the Bunyole Kingdom are relegated to cultural and development matters. However, the Sehulu exercises significant power over the government of the kingdom as Bunyole's head of state. He appoints the Prime Minister of Bunyole and the other members of the Cabinet.
