= General Assembly of Kumam =

Legislature of the Kumam Kingdom

- Coat of Arms of Kumam

Type
- Type: Unicameral

Leadership
- Chairman: George William Omuge
- Deputy Chairman: Jude Omilogor

Structure
- Seats: 335
- Political groups: Territorial Representatives (245): Clan Elders (225); Women (20); Social representatives (90): Youth (60); Disabled (30); Presiding Officer: Chairman (1)

Elections
- Voting system: Election and appointment

Meeting place
- Kaberamaido, Uganda

The General Assembly of Kumam is the legislature of the Kumam Kingdom, one of the seventeen officially recognised traditional kingdoms in Uganda.

The General Assembly consists of the heads of the 225 Kumam clans, women's representatives, representatives of the youth and representatives of the disabled community. Regarded as the supreme governing and legislative body of the Kumam, the General Assembly is charged with legislating on cultural matters, scrutinising the Won Ateker's government and passing the kingdom's yearly budget. As a cultural legislature, it is prevented from legislating on political matters.

The General Assembly is responsible for electing the Won Ateker when the throne is vacant. It also responsible for amending the Kumam constitution.
