= Ariabet of Teso =

- Coat of Arms of Teso

Type
- Type: Unicameral

Leadership
- Chairman: David Owere
- Speaker: John Francis Okuma

Structure
- Seats: 130
- Political groups: His Royal Highness's Government (33): Ekirigi and Ministers (30); Life members (3); Territorial representatives (73): District Executives (8); Sub-county representatives (65); Social representatives (24): Women (8); Youth (8); Disabled (8); Presiding Officers (2): Chairman (1); Speaker (1)

Elections
- Voting system: Election and Appointment by the Emorimor

Meeting place
- Soroti, Uganda

The Ariabet of Teso (often simply referred to as the Council in English) is the legislature of the Teso Kingdom, one of the seventeen officially recognised traditional kingdoms in Uganda. The council is regarded as the kingdom's supreme policy making organ.

The Ariabet consits of the district executives of each of the eight districts of Teso, as well as one representative from each of the sixty-five sub-counties. Also represented are eight women, eight youth and eight disabled persons, one each from every district. The members of the Teso Executive Council, which comprises the prime minister and 29 other members of the cabinet, are ex-officio members. The council is charged with legislating by-laws, legislating on cultural matters, scrutinising the royal government and passing the kingdom's yearly budget. As a cultural legislature, it is prevented from legislating on political matters.
