= Bugisu Kingdom =

Traditional Chiefdom in Uganda

Kingdom of Bugisu Bukuuka Bwa Bugisu (Lugisu)
- Flag Coat of arms
- Anthem: Bugisu Anthem
- Location of the Bugisu Kingdom (red) in Uganda (white)
- Status: Traditional kingdom
- Capital: Mbale
- Official languages: Lugisu, English
- Ethnic groups: Gisu
- Demonyms: Mugisu (singular); Bagisu (plural)
- Government: Elective constitutional monarchy
  - Monarch: Mike Mudoma Umukuuka III
  - Prime Minister: Paul Mwambu
- Legislature: General Assembly

Establishment
  - Established: 1963
  - Abolished: 1967
  - Restored: 2010

Area
  - Total: 2,447 km^{2} (945 sq mi)

Population
  - 2024 census: 1,827,757
  - Density: 746.9/km^{2} (1,934.5/sq mi)
- Currency: Ugandan shilling
- Time zone: UTC+3
- Calling code: 256

The Kingdom of Bugisu, formerly known as the Masaba Kingdom before 2025, is one of the 17 officially recognised and gazetted traditional kingdoms in Uganda. Located in eastern Uganda, the kingdom iscoterminous with the Bugisu sub-region. The kingdom is the home of the Gisu people, who constitute roughly 4.6% of Uganda's total populaiton.

Under Ugandan law, Teso is recognised as a purely cultural institution without political power. The Bagisu government's powers are limited to tasks such as promoting and protecting tradition, cultural autonomy, popular participation, community development and fostering unity among the people of the region. Through grants from the Ugandan central government and private donations, Bugisu operates development programs and institutions to improve Bagisu standards of living.

== History ==
The Bagisu of Uganda are part of the wider Masaba people of Mount Elgon, which straddles the border between Uganda and Kenya. Though Bagisu myth holds that they have always inhabited the current Bugisu sub-region, the Bagisu likely migrated into the region during the 16th century. The Bagisu are said to be descendants of Gisu, one of the sons of Masaba, the forefather of the entire Masaba people.

Britain established its rule over Bugisu in 1903, incorporating it into the Uganda Protectorate. During the early period of British rule, Bugisu was under the de facto control of the Baganda general Semei Kakungulu, who ruled the region on behalf of the British.

Bagisu society did not traditionally have a centralised monarchy, being instead governed through a loose clan system. Following Bugisu's incorporation into the protectorate, British officials subsequently began a process of 'Gandafication' to establish administrative structures modelled on those of Buganda. This process included the appointment of chiefs in 1906, subodrinate to the British District Commissioner, who governed the Bugisu District.

Constitutional developments in the 1940s and 1950s lead to the establishment of an elected District Council in 1956. These reforms would lead to the establishment of the first incarnation of a Bagisu monarchy with the advent of Ugandan independence in 1962. Under the post-independence federal constitution, each district was to have its own 'Constitutional Head' as a ceremonial analogue to the kings of Buganda, Bunyoro, Tooro and Ankole. This resulted in the creation of the position of Umuinga, with Yonasani Buyi Mungoma crowned as the first monarch of the Bagisu. Mungoma was dethroned and the nascent monarchy was abolished when Uganda was declared a republic in 1967 by Milton Obote.

=== Restoration ===
The restoration of Ugandan monarchies by Yoweri Museveni in 1993 opened the doors for a Bagisu restoration, but this did not materialise before 2010. In 2010 Wilson Wamimbi, a former ambassador to Canada and prominent leader of the Bugisu region, was crowned Umukuuka of the Inzu ya Masaba. The new title, Umukuuka, was chosen due to its more humble connotations to grandfatherhood than the old title Umuinga, associated to pride. The new monarchy, by proclaiming itself leaders of the House of Masaba, rather than just leaders of the Bagisu, also claimed cultural leadership over the Masaba population in Kenya.

The new position of Umukuuka was, under the Masaba Constitution, to be held for 5 years in rotation by the 26 clan elders. Wilson Wamimbi reigned as Umukuuka until 2015, when he was replaced by Bob Mushikori, who reigned until dying from Covid-19 in 2021. Mushikori's death triggered a succession dispute, which resulted in Mike Mudoma being elected the third Umukuuka. The final opposition to Mudoma's reign ended in 2026.

In 2025, the Ugandan government changed the name of the institution from Masaba to Bugisu, in order to more clearly define the kingdom's role and jurisdiction as being exclusively within Uganda. As such, the Umukuuka had to renounce leadership of Masaba people in Kenya.

== Government ==
Bugisu is organised as a constitutional monarchy. The Umukuuka serves as head of state as the ultimate cultural leader of the Bagisu people. As monarch, the Umukuuka is responsible for appointing a cabinet, lead by a Prime Minister, to lead the administration of the kingdom. Legislative power is vested in the General Assembly, which consists of delegated from the 26 clans. The General Assembly also has the authority to scrutinise and question minister

In addition to the cabinet and general assembly, the kingdom also has a Cultural Council, which is tasked with vetting officers appointed by the Umukuuka. There is also a Governing Board, which acts as a civil service commission overseeing the kingdom's civil administration.
