= Prime Minister of Acholi =

- Coat of arms of Acholi

- Flag of Acholi
- Incumbent; Michael Otim since 1 April 2024
- Style: The Right Honourable
- Appointer: The Lawirwodi
- Term length: At His Royal Highness' Pleasure

The Prime Minister of Acholi is the head of government of the Acholi Kingdom, one of the traditional kingdoms of Uganda. The Prime Minister is appointed by and subordinate to the Acholi monarch, the Lawirwodi, as well as being subject to the confidence of the Acholi Council of Chiefs. Alongside overseeing the kingdom's day-to-day administrative and cultural affairs, the prime minister acts as a liaison between the monarchy and the Ugandan central government

The office of Prime Minister was created in 2006, following the restoration of the Acholi Kingdom in 1999.

== List of prime ministers ==
- Kenneth Oketta Akena (2006 - 2014)
- Philip Okin Ojara (2014 - 2015)
- Ambrose Olaa (2015 - 2023)
- Okello Okuna (acting 2023 - 2024)
- Michael Otim (2024–present)
