= Lopirigo of Madi =

Title of the king of Madi, Uganda

- Emblem of the Madi Kingdom

Incumbent
- Simon Baru XI since 23 August 2024

Details
- Style: His Highness
- First monarch: Izama Angelo
- Formation: 1963
- Abolition: 17 September 1967 – 2011

The Lopirigo of Madi is the ruler and paramount chief of the Madi Kingdom in northern Uganda. As paramount chief, the Lopirigo serves as the unifying cultural and traditional leader of the Madi people. The crown is elective, being elected for life by the chiefs of the 21 Madi clans.

== History ==
The Madi people historically did not have a centralised monarchy, operating instead under a clan structure, with each clan headed by a hereditary chief.

A centralised Madi monarchy first emerged in 1962 with the advent of Ugandan independence from the British Empire. Alongside independence, the territories inhabited by the Madi people were separated from the West Nile District to form a new Madi District. The Ugandan constitution of 1962, in an effort to equalise the non-federated districts with the federated kingdoms of Buganda, Ankole, Bunyoro, Tooro and Busoga, established that each district were to have a "Constitutional Head" to act as a ceremonial monarch. This resulted the coronation of Izama Angelo as the first Lopirigo.

Following the Mengo crisis, Izama Angelo was dethroned by the government of Milton Obote in 1967, and all monarchies in Uganda abolished. The monarchies were restored by the Museveni government in 1993, but the Madi monarchy was not brought back until 2011, when Drani Stephen Izakare, a nephew of Izama Angelo, was elected Lopirigo by the clan chiefs.

A constitutional convention, convened in 2023, resulted in the adoption of a Madi constitution which defined the powers and duties of the Lopirigo. Drani Stephen Izakare was simultaneously dethroned, having been charged with seven counts of attempted murder. An assembly of the chiefs subsequently elected Simon Baru XI the new Lopirigo.

== Powers ==
According to the Madi Kingdom's constitution, the Lopirigo is the head of state and the symbol of "unity, love and peace". He is also designated as the chief custodian and mediator of the kingdom's institutions and of Madi cultural practices. The Lopirigo is vested with executive power, which is exercised through the Executive Committee, headed by the Prime Minister. The prime minister is appointed by the Lopirigo, with the consent of the General Assembly. The constitution further bans the Lopirigo from participating in partisan politics.

== Election ==
The Lopirigo is an elective monarch, being elected by the general assembly from among the 21 hereditary chiefs of the Madi clans. The term of office of the Lopirigo is for life or until the age of 75, and the constitution also places a minimum age requirement of 45. The Lopirigo may, by a two-thirds majority, be dethroned by the general assembly for abuse of office, physical or mental incapacity, or misconduct.

== List of Lopirigo ==
- Izama Abgelo: 1962 - 1967
- Position abolished: 1967-2011
- Drani Stephen Izakare: 2011-2023
- Simon Baru XI: 2024-present
