= Prime Minister of Bugisu =

- Coat of Arms of Bugisu

- Flag of Bugisu
- Incumbent; Paul Mwambu since 28 December 2024
- Style: The Right Honourable
- Appointer: The Umukuuka
- Term length: At His Royal Highness' pleasure

The Prime Minister of Bugisu is the head of government of the Kingdom of Bugisu, one of the traditional kingdoms within Uganda. The Prime Minister is subordinate to and appointed by the Bagisu monarch, the Umukuuka. The Prime Minister chairs the Bugisu cabinet of ministers and thereby exercises the day-to-day governance of the kingdom on behalf of the monarch.
