= Ikumbania of Bugwere =

Title of the king of Bugwere, Uganda

- Coat of Arms of Bugwere

Incumbent
- Disputed between Geoffrey Wayabire II and Kintu Mubbala since 7 February 2021

Details
- Style: His Royal Highness
- First monarch: Kintu Mubbala
- Formation: 2006

The Ikumbania of Bugwere is the constitutional monarch of the Bugwere Kingdom, one of the 17 officially recognised traditional kingdoms in Uganda. The Ikumbania serves as a unifying cultural figure for the Gwere people. The crown is elective, with the Ikumbania elected for life by and from among the chiefs of 78 Bagwere clans. Since the death of Ikumbania John Wayabire I in 2021, the throne has been disputed between his son, Geoffrey Wayabire II, and Kintu Mubbala, the first but uncrowned Ikumbania, who was displaced from the throne by John Wayabire I in 2013.

== Political power ==
As head of state of Bugwere, the Ikumbania wields significant power over the government of the kingdom. Ugandan law however prohibits traditional monarchs from exercising political powers or being involved in politics. As such the powers of the Ikumbania and the Bugwere Kingdom's government are relegated to cultural and development matters. Under the terms of the 2013 Constitution of Bugwere, the Ikumbania appoints the Prime Minister of Bugwere and the other members of the government.
