= Prime Minister of Madi =

- Coat of Arms of Madi

- Flag of Madi
- Incumbent; Amacha Goli since 23 August 2024
- Style: The Honourable
- Appointer: The Lopirigo; with approval of the General Assembly
- Term length: 5 years, renewable once

The Prime Minister of Madi is the head of government of the Madi Kingdom, one of the traditional kingdoms within Uganda. The Prime Minister is subordinate to and appointed by the monarch of Madi, the Lopirigo. The Prime Minister chairs the Execuive Committee of the kingdom and thereby exercises the day-to-day governance of the kingdom on behalf of the monarch.

== Appointment and term ==
The Prime Minister is appointed by the Lopirigo, but the appointment requires the approval of the Madi legislature, the General Assembly. The appointment is for a 5-year term, unless dismissed earlier by the Lopirigo or removed from office by a two-thirds majority of the assembly. A prime minister can serve a maximum of two 5-year terms.
