= Prime Minister of Bunyole =

Head of government of the Kingdom of Bunyole

- Coat of Arms of Bunyole

- Flag of Bunyole
- Incumbent; Apollo Lydda since 3 March 2020
- Style: The Right Honourable
- Appointer: The Sehulu
- Term length: At His Highness' pleasure

The Prime Minister of Bunyole is the head of government of the Kingdom of Bunyole, one of the officially recognised traditional kingdoms within Uganda. The Prime Minister is subordinate to and appointed by the Banyole monarch, the Sehulu. The Prime Minister chairs the Banyole cabinet of ministers and exercises the day-to-day governance on behalf of the Sehulu.
