= Langa of Lugbara =

Legislature of Lugbara Kari

- Coat of Arms of Lugbara

Type
- Type: Unicameral

Leadership
- Speaker: Christopher Yiki

Structure
- Seats: 40
- Political groups: Territorial representatives (40): Ayivu (9); Maracha (9); Terego (9); Vurra (9); Chiefs (4); Presiding Officer (1): Speaker (1)

Elections
- Voting system: Election

Meeting place
- Arua, Uganda

The Langa of Lugbara (also constitutionally referred to as the Parliament) is the legislature of Lugbara Kari, one of the seventeen officially recognised traditional kingdoms in Uganda. The Langa is regarded as the kingdom's supreme legislative and policy-making body.

The Langa has a total of 40 members, with each of the Lugbara's four sub-tribes represented by 10 members. Each sub-tribe's delegation must constitutionally consist of 4 men, 3 women, 1 person with a disability and 1 youth, as well as the chief of the sub-tribe. The Langa is charged with legislating by-laws, legislating on cultural matters, scrutinising the kingdom's government, and approving the yearly budget. As a cultural legislature, it is prevented from legislating on political matters.
