= Acholi Council of Chiefs =

Acholi Council of Chiefs Acholi Ker Kal Kwaro (Acoli)
- Coat of arms of Acholi

Type
- Type: Unicameral

Leadership
- Speaker: Garrison Latim

Structure
- Seats: 58
- Political groups: Territorial representatives (58): Chiefs (58)

Elections
- Voting system: Hereditary

Meeting place
- Council Hall, Acholi Royal Palace; Gulu, Uganda

The Council of Chiefs, also known in Acholi as Ker Kal Kwaro Acholi (literally Assembly of the Acholi) is the Parliament of the Acholi Kingdom in northern Uganda.

The Council of Chiefs is convened in the Council Hall at the Royal Palace in Gulu, the capital of Acholiland. The membership consists of the 58 hereditary chiefs of the Acholi clans. The body is chaired by the speaker, currently Garrison Latim. The Council of Chiefs is the primary policy-making body of the Acholi Kingdom and charged with legislating by-laws of the kingdom and scrutinising the kingdom's government, but is not allowed by the state government to legislate on political matters.

The Prime Minister of Acholi, though appointed by and responsible to the Lawirwodi also requires the confidence of the Council of Chiefs to remain in office.
