= Elley Wesana Chomi =

King of the Bunyole Kingdom since 2019

- Professor

Sehulu of Bunyole
- Reign: 22 September 2019 – present
- Predecessor: Dauson Mauta
- Born: 1943 (age 82–83); Uganda
- Religion: Christian

Elley Wesana Chomi (born 1943) is the reigning Sehulu of Bunyole, one of the traditional kingdoms in Uganda. He is the first substantive occupant of the Banyole throne, having been elected to rule over the Nyole people in 2019 following the long interim rule of Dauson Mauta.

== Private life ==
Wesana Chomi was born in 1943 into the Bahidolwa clan of the Banyole people. An educated academic, he holds a PhD in linguistics. He holds the title of professor from Kabale University, where he has worked as director of post-graduate studies.

== Reign ==
Wesana Chomi was elected Sehulu of Bunyole by an assembly of 136 clan leaders on 21 September 2019, winning 91 votes. Wesana Chomi thereby became the first permanent cultural leader of the Banyole people, with his predecessor, Dauson Mauta, having held the title in an acting capacity since the provisional formation of the Bunyole Kingdom in 2009.
