= General Assembly of Bugisu =

- Coat of Arms of Bugisu

Type
- Type: Unicameral

Leadership
- Speaker: Nelson Wedaira

Structure
- Seats: 130
- Political groups: Clan Representatives (130): Clan Representatives (104); Clan Elders (26); Presiding Officer: Speaker (1)

Elections
- Voting system: Election

Meeting place
- Mbale, Uganda

The General Assembly of Bugisu is the legislature of the Bugisu Kingdom, one of the seventeen officially recognised traditional kingdoms in Uganda.

The General Assembly consists of representatives of the 26 Bagisu clans. Regarded as the supreme governing and legislative body of the kingdom, the General Assembly is charged with legislating on cultural matters, scrutinising the Umukuuka's government and passing the kingdom's yearly budget. As a cultural legislature, it is prevented from legislating on political matters.

The most central role of the General Assembly is to act as an electoral college to elect the Bagisu monarch, the Umukuuka. As Bugisu is an elective monarchy, the Umukuuka is elected for a 5-year term by the general assembly from among the elders of the 26 clans.
