= Tophace Kaahwa =

Ugandan politician

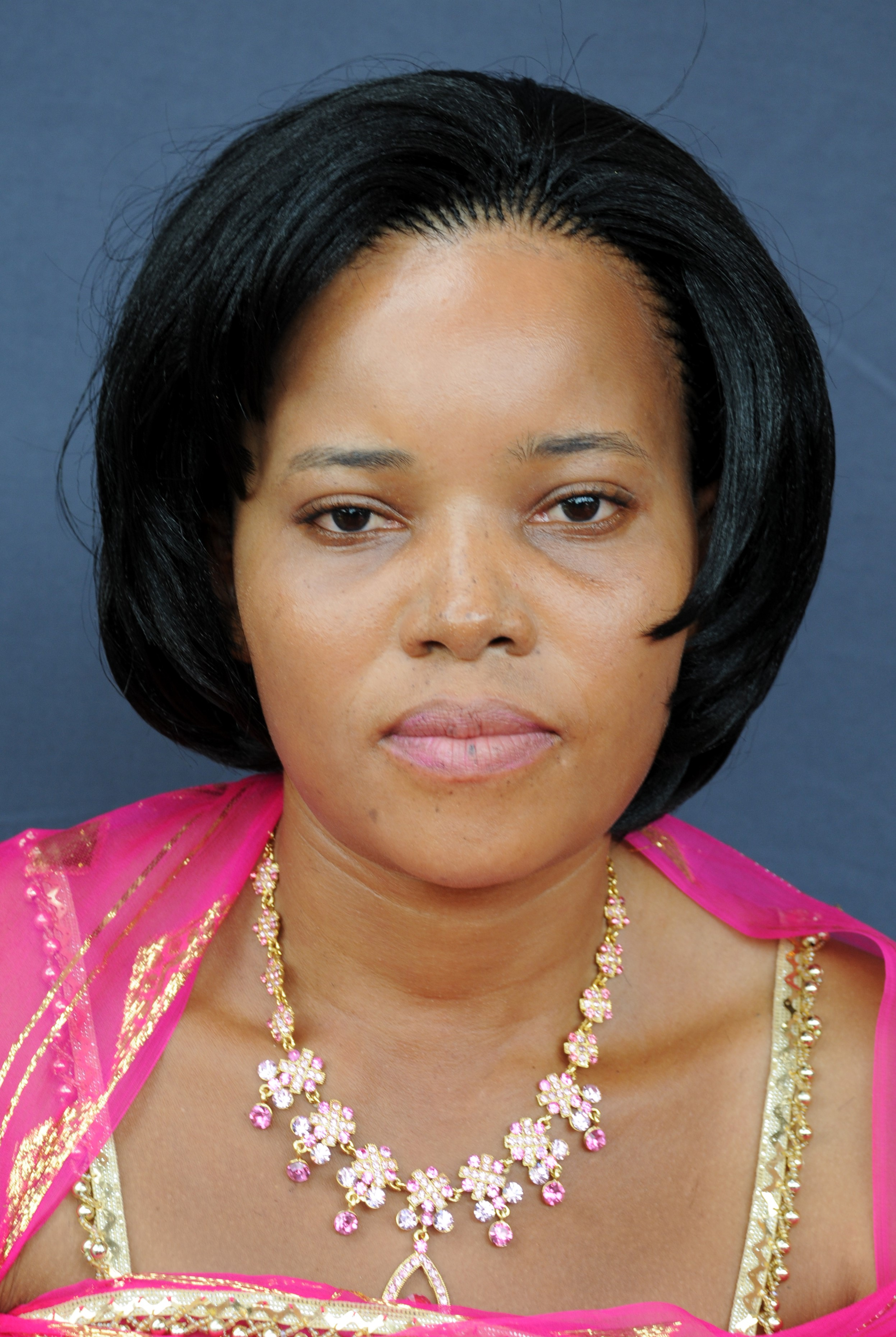
- Born: Tophace Kaahwa; 1 September 1974 (age 51); Hoima District, Uganda
- Citizenship: Uganda
- Education: Bulera Core Primary Teachers' College (Grade III Teacher Certificate); Kyambogo University (Diploma in Teacher Education, Bachelor of Education); Uganda Christian University (Masters of Education, Planning and Management)
- Occupations: Teacher, politician
- Years active: 1996–present
- Title: Uganda's ambassador to Japan

Tophace Byagira Kaahwa (born 1 September 1974) is a teacher and politician serving as Uganda’s ambassador to Japan.

She previously served as the Member of Parliament for the Hoima District Women's Representative in the 10th Parliament (2016–2021). She served in the same role in the 9th Parliament (2011–2016).

== Background and education ==
Kaahwa was born in Hoima District, in the Western Region of Uganda, on 1 September 1974. She attended Kihabwemi Primary School. where she attained her Primary Leaving Examinations(PLE) then She then joined to Ikoba Girls' Secondary School, where she completed her O-Level studies and she attained her Uganda Certificate of Education(UCE) from there.

In 1994, she enrolled into Bulera Core Primary Teachers' College, graduating in 1996, with a Grade III Teacher's Certificate. Later, she was admitted to Kyambogo University, where she first obtained a Diploma in Teacher Education in 2003, followed by a Bachelor of Education degree in 2008. In 2013, she received a Masters of Education, Planning and Management degree from the Uganda Christian University, in Mukono District.

== Work experience ==
She started out as a Grade III Teacher at Katereiga Primary School and at St. Aloysius Primary School, where she taught until 1998. In 2005, following the Diploma from Kyambogo University, she was appointed Deputy Head Teacher at Bunyoro Catholic School, Kigaaya, before she became the Head Teacher at Haibale Primary School, serving there until 2006.

From 2006 until 2010, she served as a tutor at Bulera Core Primary Teachers' College, where she was the Acting Deputy Principal in 2008.

== Political career ==
In 2010, she joined Uganda's elective politics. She contested and won the National Resistance Movement political party primary against the two-term incumbent Beatrice Byenkya, in the Hoima District Women's Constituency. She went on to win the general election and was re-elected in 2016.

While working in Parliament, she has been a member of the Committee on Commissions, State Authorities & State Enterprises (COSACE), the Committee on Agriculture and the Committee of on Equal Opportunities.

== See also ==
- List of members of the ninth Parliament of Uganda
- List of members of the tenth Parliament of Uganda
