= Umukuuka of Bugisu =

Title of the king of Bugisu, Uganda

- Coat of arms of Bugisu
- Incumbent; Mike Mudoma Umukuuka III since 6 October 2020
- Style: His Royal Highness
- Residence: Masaba Palace
- Appointer: General Assembly
- Term length: Five years
- Formation: 1963; Abolished 1967; Restored 2010
- Website: inzuyamasaaba.org

The Umukuuka of Bugisu is the constitutional monarch of the Bugisu Kingdom, one of the 17 officially recognised traditional kingdoms in Uganda. The Umukuuka serves as a unifying cultural figure for the Gisu and Masaba people, traditionally in both Uganda and Kenya, but since 2025 only in Uganda The crown is elective for a five-year term, with the crown intended to rotate among the elders of the 26 Bagisu clans.

== Political power ==
Ugandan law prohibits traditional monarchs from exercising political powers or being involved in politics. As such the powers of the Umukuuka and the Bugisu Kingdom are relegated to cultural and development matters. As head of state of Bugisu, the Umukuuka exercises significant power over the government of the kingdom. He appoints the Prime Minister of Bugisu and the other members of the Cabinet. The Umukuuka also appoints civil servants, and these appointments are overseen and scrutinised by the Governing Board.

== Election and tenure ==
The Umukuuka is an elective monarch, being elected for a five-year term by the General Assembly of Bugisu. The position is elected in rotation, with each Umukuuka to be succeeded by a prominent elder from the next of the 26 Bagisu clans.

Disagreements over the precise start of a term has given rise to occasional succession disputes. The reigning Umukuuka, Mike Mudoma Umukuuka III, was elected and crowned in 2020, but was not formally recognised by the Ugandan government until 2023. Mudoma and his supporters thereby counted his term as starting in 2023 and ending in 2028, while opponents regarded his term as completed in 2025. Court challenges resulted in Mudoma's term being extended until 2028.

== Style and regnal name ==
The Umukuuka is addressed with the style of Royal Highness.

Each Umukuuka, in additional to their personal name, adopts Umukuuka as their regnal name, followed by the corresponding regnal number. As such, Mike Mudoma rules under the regnal name Mike Mudoma Umukuuka III.

== List of Umukuuka ==
- Yonasani Buyi Mungoma (as Umuinga) (1963–1967)
- Wilson Wamimbi Umukuuka I (2010–2015)
- Bob Mushikiro Umukuuka II (2015–2020)
- Mike Mudoma Umukuuka III (2020–present)
