= Prime Minister of Bugwere =

- Coat of Arms of Bugwere

- Flag of Bugwere
- Incumbent; Moses Joel Mugulusi since 17 September 2020
- Style: The Right Honourable
- Appointer: The Ikumbania
- Term length: At His Royal Highness' pleasure

The Prime Minister of Bugwere is the head of government of the Kingdom of Bugwere, one of the traditional kingdoms within Uganda. The Prime Minister is subordinate to and appointed by the monarch of Bugwere, the Ikumbania The Prime Minister chairs the Bugwere cabinet of ministers and thereby exercises the day-to-day governance of the kingdom on behalf of the monarch.
