= Kintu Mubbala =

King of the Bugwere Kingdom (disputed)

Ikumbania of Bugwere (disputed)
- Reign: 2007 – present
- Predecessor: Monarchy established

Secretary of the Uganda Land Commission
- In office 2002–2011
- Succeeded by: Henry Kaweesa
- Born: 17 August 1945 (age 81); Kibuku, Uganda
- Religion: Christian

Kintu Mubbala (Balaam Samuku Mubbala Kintu; born 17 August 1945) is the disputedly reigning Ikumbania (king) of the Bugwere Kingdom and people in Uganda. He has reigned since 2007, when he was selected as the first Ikumbania following the establishment of the kingdom. His reign has been disputed since 2013, when he was dethroned by the Bugwere constituent assembly and replaced by John Wayabire I, who was officially recognised by the Ugandan government. Mubbala has never recognised his dethronement.

His reign is presently disputed by Geoffrey Wayabire II, the son of John Wayabire I, who was declared Ikumbania following his father's death in 2021.

== Personal life ==
Kintu Mubbala was born on 17 October 1945 in the village of Bumiza near Kibuku, as a member of the Balalaka clan.

Mubbala holds a Master's degree in land surveying. He worked as a civil servant, rising to become secretary of the Uganda Land Commission by 2002. Mubbala was arrested in 2011 and charged with corruption and disobeying orders in his capacity as secretary, being remanded to Luzira prison. He was subsequently convicted and stripped of office.

== Reign ==
Mubbala was proclaimed the first Ikumbania of Bugwere in 2007. His enthronement faced opposition from certain Bagwere clans, who sought to prevent his assumption of the throne. These court cases ruled in favour of Mubbala's right to the throne.

Following his conviction for corruption in 2012, Mubbala was dethroned as Ikumbania. He was replaced by John Wayabire I, who subsequently was formally recognised as king by the Ugandan government. Mubbala did not recognise his deposition, and continued to maintain his claim to the throne.

Following John Wayabire I's death in February 2021, Mubbala again reasserted his rights to the throne. The proclamation of Geoffrey Wayabire II, John's son, as the new Ikumbania by an assembly of clan elders was rejected by Mubbala. Mubbala subsequently obtained a court ruling declaring him the legitimate Ikumbania, but this was rejected by Wayabire's supporters, and the Ugandan government declined to recognise him.

Following court mediation, an agreement in September 2026 established that Wayabire II and Mubbala would consent to an electoral process to solve the dispute, giving the heads of the 78 Bagwere clans the decision to elect an Ikumbania.
