= Beatrice Byenkya =

Ugandan politician

- Born: Uganda
- Citizenship: Uganda
- Occupation: Politician
- Years active: 2000 – present
- Known for: Politics
- Title: Chairperson of Uganda Land Commission

Beatrice Nyakaisiki Byenkya is a Ugandan politician, who serves as the Chairperson of the Uganda Land Commission. She was appointed to that position on 18 April 2019. Her appointment requires the approval of the Ugandan parliament.

== Background and career ==
Byenkya previously served as the Woman Representative for Hoima District in the 7th Parliament (2001–2006) and the 8th Parliament (2006–2011). She lost her seat during the National Resistance Movement political party, primary elections of the 2016 election cycle, losing to the former Woman MP for Hoima District, Tophace Byagira Kaahwa. During the 7th parliament, she was one of the few members of parliament, who refused to accept the USh5 million (approx. US$2,000 at that time) given to each MP, as inducement to change the Constitution and remove the presidential term-limits.

Her appointment to chair the Uganda Land Commission (ULC), comes at a time when ULC is mired in controversy, including court cases of (a) unlawful evictions of people from their lands (b) forgery of land titles (c) illegal possession of land by wealthy businessmen and (d) rampant corruption. In 2018, Justice Catherine Bamugemereire of the Land Inquiry Commission, directed the arrest of some of ULC officials over allegations of abuse of office, neglect of duty and corruption.

At ULC, Byenkya replaced Baguma Isoke, a former Minister of Lands in the Ugandan cabinet, who served as chairman, from 2013 until 2019.

== Other considerations ==
In 2012, president Yoweri Museveni appointed Beatrice Byenkya to the Immigration and Citizen Control Board.

== See also ==
- Parliament of Uganda
- Hoima
