= Ekirigi of Teso =

- Coat of Arms of Teso

- Flag of Teso
- Incumbent; Andrew Ocole since 12 August 2024
- Style: The Right Honourable
- Appointer: The Emorimor
- Term length: At His Royal Highness' pleasure

The Ekirigi of Teso is the head of government of the Teso Kingdom, one of the traditional kingdoms within Uganda. The Ekiriki, also commonly referred to as the prime minister, is subordinate to and appointed by the Teso monarch, the Emorimor. The Ekirigi chairs the Teso Executive Council, the kingdom's cabinet, and is thereby charged with exercising the day-to-day governance of the Teso realm.

As head of government, the Ekirigi is an ex-officio member of the Ariabet, Teso's legislative assembly. The Ekirigi is assisted by five deputy prime ministers, each with responsibility for one of Teso's five regions; Northern Teso, Central Teso, Eastern Teso, Southern Teso, and the Iteso diaspora.
