= Bunyole Chiefdom =

Chiefdom of Busoga, Uganda

Bunyole
Banyole

Regions with significant populations
- Uganda

Languages
- Lunyole

Religion
- Christianity, Islam, Traditional beliefs

Related ethnic groups
- Bagisu, Bagwere, Japadhola, Basoga

The Bunyole Chiefdom (sometimes called Bunhole) is a traditional chiefdom within the Kingdom of Busoga, populated by the ethnic group known as the Banyole people, who primarily inhabit the eastern regions of Uganda, including the neighbouring Bunyole Kingdom. The term encompasses both the political-administrative entity and the cultural-ethnic identity of the people who have historically inhabited this region of eastern Uganda. It became a part of the British protectorate in Busoga in 1896. Its ruler is known as the Nanyumba.

== The Chiefdom ==
As a traditional chiefdom, Bunyole represents one of the six original traditional chiefdoms of the Kingdom of Busoga in Uganda, having been established before the arrival of British colonial administration. The chiefdom became part of the British protectorate in Busoga in 1896, marking its formal incorporation into colonial administrative structures while maintaining its traditional governance systems.

The chiefdom operates under traditional monarchy principles, with hereditary leadership that has maintained continuity from pre-colonial times through the contemporary period. This governance structure reflects the broader pattern of traditional authority in Busoga, where individual chiefdoms maintain distinct identities while participating in the larger kingdom framework.

== The Banyole People ==
The Banyole are among the minor Bantu tribes in Uganda, speaking Lunyole as their primary language and maintaining distinct cultural practices that distinguish them from neighboring ethnic groups. They are also known by the alternative name "Abalya Lwooba," which translates to "mushroom eaters," reflecting their traditional dietary practices and cultural affinity for mushrooms as a food source.

The Banyole people primarily inhabit the eastern district of Butaleja, where they constitute the largest ethnic group at approximately 6% of the district's population. Their geographical location places them in close proximity to several other ethnic groups, including the Japadhola, Bagisu, and Bagwere peoples, creating a culturally diverse region in eastern Uganda.

== Historical Context ==
The Banyole were among the various ethnic groups inhabiting the plains between Lake Kyoga to the west and the slopes of Mount Elgon to the east when the British established the Bukedi District in this area at the beginning of the 20th century. This geographical positioning placed them within a region that also contained other significant ethnic groups, including the Gisu people in the mountainous areas, creating a complex multi-ethnic landscape.

The establishment of colonial administrative structures significantly impacted the Banyole people's traditional ways of life, as they were incorporated into the broader colonial administrative framework while maintaining their cultural identity and traditional practices. This period marked a significant transformation in their political organization and relationship with neighboring communities.

== Cultural Practices ==
The Banyole maintain distinctive cultural practices that reflect their Bantu heritage while incorporating elements specific to their geographical location and historical experiences. Their traditional dietary practices, particularly their consumption of mushrooms, have become a defining characteristic that distinguishes them from neighboring ethnic groups.

The community's cultural practices include traditional ceremonies, customary law systems, and social organization structures that have been maintained across generations despite external influences from colonialism and modernization. These practices contribute to the rich cultural diversity of eastern Uganda and represent important elements of the region's cultural heritage.

== Contemporary Status ==
In contemporary Uganda, the Banyole people continue to maintain their cultural identity while participating in the broader national political and economic systems. They remain concentrated in Butaleja District, where they constitute the largest ethnic group and play significant roles in local governance and economic activities.

The dual identity of Bunyole as both a traditional chiefdom and an ethnic group reflects the complex relationship between traditional governance structures and ethnic identity in contemporary Uganda. This relationship demonstrates how traditional institutions continue to serve important cultural and administrative functions within the modern state framework.
