= Rwot Acana =

Ugandan cultural leader and Paramount Chief of the Acholi people

David Acana II
- Paramount Chief of the Acholi People
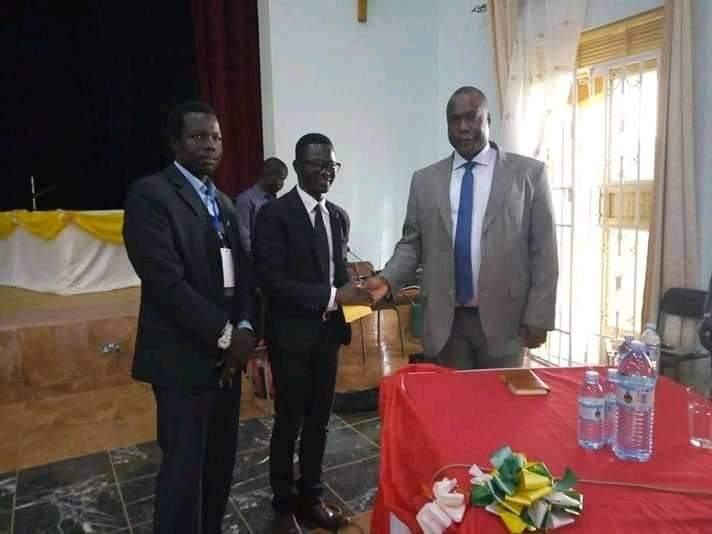
- Rwot David Onen Acana II, (Right)

Lawirwodi of Acholi
- Reign: 1999 – present
- Coronation: January 2005
- Predecessor: Godfrey Acana I
- Born: Rwot David Onen Acana II; 1967 (age 58–59); Uganda
- House: Payira Clan (Acholi)
- Father: Rwot Justine Acana
- Mother: Peninnah Achaa
- Religion: Traditional Acholi beliefs

David Onen Acana II (born in 1967) is a Ugandan cultural leader who reigns as the Paramount Chief of the Acholi People and head of the Acholi Kingdom, since his investiture in January 2005. He is known for advocacy on peacebuilding, traditional justice, and community reconciliation in Northern Uganda.

== Early life and Ker Kwaro Acholi ==
Rwot Acana II was born in 1967 to the late Rwot Justine Achana of the Payira clan, the most numerous of all Acholi clans, and Ms Peninnah Achaa, of the Bwobo clan.

Rwot Achana II was enthroned as Acholi Paramount Chief in Gulu in January 2005, when the position was newly created to coordinate Acholi clan leadership under a single cultural authority. He became the titular head of Ker Kwaro Acholi after its inception in 2000.

Ker Kwaro Acholi is a customary seat of the Acholi paramountcy and a focal point for cultural governance. The institution states its headquarters are in Gulu city in Northern Uganda. Research on the institution notes its post-2005 consolidation, with efforts to formalize structures for mediation, cultural affairs, and community development in partnership with external actors.

== Peacebuilding and justice engagement ==
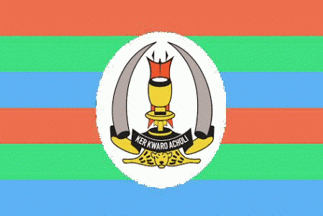
Acholi nationalist flag

During the later stages of the conflict with the Lord’s Resistance Army (LRA), Acana publicly pressed for negotiated solutions and supported traditional conflict management. In December 2016 he led or co-led a delegation of northern Uganda leaders to The Hague to observe the International Criminal Court trial of Dominic Ongwen, an LRA commander later convicted of war crimes and crimes against humanity. He said that some people said he had gone to this trial to plan the arrest of Joseph Kony and his troops meanwhile others were planned to go and investigate what had he gone to do there.

In 2024, Acana forgrounded peace insecurity in Acholi sub-region like the effect of prolonged displacement in Internally Displaced Persons (IDP) camps had driven socio-economic challenges that later increase land disputes and regional tension and Agur that he described as thugs within the cities where he said this is emplify by impoverishment within the community. He also offered a critical advised to the government to hasten the limit of boundaries to promote peace and harmony within community within the region. He also appreciated Uganda People's Defence Force in fighting against poorness through Operation Wealth Creation like coffee planting.

In order to build substainable communities, Acana urged the Uganda Prisons in 2024 to collaborate with the communities because they can train and teach the surrounding community with production process of quality seeds and animal breedings by themselves. He put forward that Acholi people are known agriculturalists.He said that however this partnership can be prioritized but people should take caution the land is not for free and their owners should be honoured since the most pressing issue within the region is land dispute since land is also the limitted resource available.

=== Acholi festivals ===
He called people from the ribe of Acholi for peace, unity and cooperation towards the 2026 Acholi Cultural Festival themed "Acholi Cultural Festival Will Promote Unity and Development". During the lauuch, he said that the festival had black eye due to disunity from different stakeholders which include children elders and other stakeholders.

=== Cultural rituals ===
Acana attedned the ICC trial of Dominic Ongwen in 2016 which sparked discussion in Acholi communities for a cultural ritual known as "mato oput" which shows reconciliation between clans of both the victim and the perpetrator but he said that he would have spreaded the message of this cultural ritual only if ICC was not powerful more than the culture.

=== Acholi parliamentary group (APG) ===
This was an association formed in 1989 to formally engage government in responding to the Lord's Resistance Army war spearheaded by Joseph Kony.In 2026, Acana cautioned MPs of Acholi during two-days meeting organized by Acholi Parliamentary Group to debar from reckless conduct which includes adulterous relationships, impregnating young girls and abandoning spouses after joining Parliament.He said with great griefs that out of the four ministers that Acholi has, only one attended the call and out of the absentees were Hillary Onek(Palabek County's MP and minister for general duties), Norbert Mao(Laroo-Pece Division's MP and minister of constitutional affairs) and Lillian Aber( representing Kitgum district and state minister of relief, disaster preparedness and refugees) with Beatrice Akello Akori (state minister for Northern Uganda) present. He warned them to remain accessible by their communities and cultural leaders. While cntinuing with his speeches, Acana said that some law markers go to Kampala at night and stop along the way in the name of their project yet engaging with other female relationships but these kind of behaviours are known by their voters.

== Leadership disputes ==
From mid-2023 a faction of Acholi clan leaders disputed Acana’s authority, triggering attempts to alter the institution’s constitution and to organize a replacement. This was reported in June 2024 on an effort to “dethrone” him and the subsequent regulatory pushback on contested documents. On 14 June 2024 a breakaway group announced the election of Rwot Richard Santo Apire as a rival Paramount Chief, a move Acana and his supporters rejected as unlawful.

The Government of Uganda, through the Minister of Gender, Labour and Social Development Betty Amongi, stated on 23 June 2025 that Acana II is the legitimate Acholi Paramount Chief recognized by the state.

== See also ==
- Michael Moses Odongo Okune
- Mutesa II
