= Tooro =

Tooro may refer to:

- Tooro Kingdom, a traditional kingdom of Uganda
- Tooro language, or Rutooro, a Bantu language of Uganda
- Tooro people, or Batooro, a Bantu ethnic group, native to the Tooro Kingdom
- Tooro sub-region in Uganda

== See also ==
- Futa Tooro, a region in western Africa
