= Isimoola of Bugwere =

- Coat of arms of Bugwere

Type
- Type: Unicameral

Elections
- Voting system: Election

Meeting place
- Embuga; Budaka, Uganda

The Isimoola is the Parliament of the Bugwere Kingdom in eastern Uganda.

The Isimoola is convened at the Embuga, which is within the Budaka Town Hall. It is an elected body, with its members holding the title of Bakwenda. The Isimoola can legislate on cultural matters and is tasked with scrutinising the Bagwere government, but it is prevented from legislating on political matters under the terms of Ugandan law.
