= Geoffrey Wayabire II =

King of the Bugwere Kingdom (disputed)

Ikumbania of Bugwere (disputed)
- Reign: 14 July 2022 – present
- Predecessor: John Wayabire I
- Born: 5 October 1991 (age 35); Uganda
- Father: John Wayabire I
- Mother: Sarah Harriet Wayabire
- Religion: Christian

Geoffrey Wayabire II (born 5 October 1991) is the reigning Ikumbania (king) of the Bugwere Kingdom and people in Uganda. He has reigned since 2022, when he was elected to succeed his father, John Wayabire I, who had reigned since 2014.

His reign is disputed by Kintu Mubbala, the first reigning Ikumbania, who was dethroned in favour of John Wayabire I in 2013, an action Mubbala never recognised.

== Life and family ==
Geoffrey Wayabire was born on 5 October 1991. He is the son of Ikumbania John Wayabire I and Sarah Harriet Wayabire, the Queen Mother.

An actively preaching evangelical minister, Wayabire received a PhD in Christian counselling from the Heart Bible International University in 2023. He also received the President's Volunteer Service Award in 2023.

== Reign ==
Following the death of his father Ikumbania John Wayabire I from Covid-19 on 7 February 2021, Geoffrey Wayabire was put forward as a candidate to succeed his father. Following a chaotic electoral process, Wayabire was eventually declared Ikumbania in July 2022, as Geoffrey Wayabire II.

Wayabire II's accession was however challenged by Kintu Mubbala. In 2026, an agreement between the two parties committed to holding a process among the clans to select which of them was the legitimate Ikumbania.

Wayabire represented Bugwere at the 2023 royal wedding of Nadiope IV of Busoga.
