= Uganda Land Commission =

Ugandan government agency

- Company type: Parastatal
- Industry: Land preservation
- Founded: 1995
- Headquarters: Kampala, Uganda
- Key people: Beatrice Byenkya (chairperson)
- Products: Ownership verification and maintenance

The Uganda Land Commission (ULC) is a semi-autonomous land verification, monitoring, and preservation organisation, owned by the Ugandan government, that is mandated to document, verify, preserve, and maintain land owned and/or administered by the government.

== Location ==
The headquarters of ULC is located on the 4th Floor, Nakawa Business Park, at 3-5 New Port Bell Road, in the Nakawa neighborhood of Kampala, Uganda's capital and largest city. This is approximately 4 km (2.5 mi), by road, east of the city's central business district. The coordinates of the Commission's head office are:0°19'39.0"N, 32°36'45.0"E (Latitude:0.327500; Longitude:32.612500).

== Overview ==
The ULC was created by the Ugandan Parliament in 1995. The mission of the ULC is to hold and manage all land in Uganda legally owned or acquired by the Government in accordance with the Constitution of Uganda. The Commission is also responsible for holding and managing land owned by Uganda, outside of the country. However, that second mandate may be delegated to Uganda's Missions abroad. The Commission is governed by a full-time Chairperson, assisted by up to eight part-time Commissioners. The Commission's Secretariat is headed by the Secretary who is assisted by the Undersecretary. The Undersecretary heads three distinct functional units namely; (a) Finance and Administration, (b) Technical Support and (c) Land Fund.

== Governance ==
The institution is governed by a six-person board of directors. As of April 2019, the following individuals were members of that board.

1. Beatrice Byenkya: Chairperson
2. Pen-Mogi Nyeko: Member
3. Asuman Kyafu: Member
4. Stella Achan: Member
5. Rukiika Bujara: Member
6. Charles Muhoozi: Member

Past chairpersons of the Uganda Land Commission include the following:

- Jehoash Mayanja Nkangi: From 2002 to 2012.
- Baguma Isoke: From 2013 to 2019.
- Beatrice Byenkya: From 2019 until present.

== See also ==
- Economy of Uganda
- Ugandan Ministry of Lands Housing and Urban Development
