= Mike Mudoma Umukuuka III =

King of the Bugisu Kingdom

Umukuuka of Bugisu
- Reign: 6 October 2020 - present
- Coronation: 14 October 2023
- Predecessor: Bob Mushikiro Umukuuka II
- Born: 1956 (age 69–70); Buyobo, Sironko District, Uganda
- Spouse: Annet Mudoma

Mike Mudoma Umukuuka III (Jude Mike Mudoma; born 1956) is the reigning Umukuuka (king) of the Bugisu Kingdom in eastern Uganda. He was elected to the throne in 2020 following the death of Bob Mushikiro Umukuuka II and was crowned and formally recognised by the Ugandan government in 2023.

== Early life and family ==
Jude Mike Mudoma was born in 1956 in Koitangiro, on the outskirts of the town of Buyobo in Sironko District of eastern Uganda. He was born into the Bumayuya clan as the son of Butulumayo Mudoma.

He is married to Annet Mudoma.

== Reign ==
Following the death of Bob Mushikiro Umukuuka II in 2020, Mudoma was elected Umukuuka for a five year term, becoming Umukuuka III. His election was disputed by a rival faction of Bagisu elders. Following court orders and injunctions, Mudoma was crowned as Umukuuka on 14 October 2023, and subsequently recognised by the Ugandan government.

The delay between Mudoma's election as Umukuuka and his coronation and government recognition eventually triggered a dispute over Mudoma's term. Mudoma's supporters counted his five year term as beginning in 2023 and being completed in 2028, while opponents regarded his term as having started at his election in 2020 and ending in 2025. This dispute was resolved by court mediation in 2026, with Mudoma's term as Umukuuka officially extended to 2028.
