= Agofe =

Title of the king of Lugbara Kari, Uganda

Agofe of Lugbara
- Coat of Arms of Lugbara

Incumbent
- Vacant since 26 October 2026

Details
- Style: His Highness
- First monarch: Jalwere Jalusiga
- Formed: 1922

The Agofe is the constitutional monarch and paramount chief of the Lugbara Kingdom, one of the officially recognised traditional kingdoms in Uganda. The term means 'Pillar' or 'Paramount Chief' (Chief of chiefs) and was the title given to Jalusiga (an Alur chosen by the British). A king is also called opi in Lugbara though an opi is usually a chief or the clan leader of a Lugbara lineage. Around 1967, President Milton Obote abolished kingdoms, but then the 1995 Uganda Constitution reinstated cultural institutions and by 2000, the Lugbara Cultural Institution had evolved. In 2015, the Government of Uganda finally accepted this revised Agofe institution among the 17 recognised cultural institutions in Uganda. The Agofe's duty is to preserve Lugbara culture through literature and other assignments.

== Paramount Chiefs ==
Jalwere Jalusiga (1896-1978) from Alur Tribe was appointed Paramount Chief over the whole of West Nile by British colonialists in 1922. He was called Agofe Obim.

Mariko Boroa from Terego Clan was elected by the Lugbara Association of Elders (Obim removed from title) after Uganda's 1962 Independence until President Milton Obote abolished cultural institutions in 1967.

Jason Avutia from Vurra Clan reigned after the 1986 NRM Liberation and restoration of cultural institutions until his death at 96 years old in January 2023.

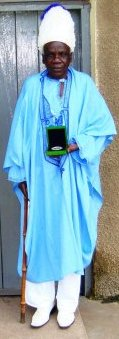
His Highness Culu (Mr.) Jason Avutia, the 3rd Agofe

Although election of his replacement was planned for 2021, it did not happen until after his 2023 death. Avutia resided in (Mvara Parish of) Arua Town, the cultural headquarters, where he headed the Association of Arua District Elders for two decades. Many people knew him as the Chairman of LULA (Lugbara Literature Association) but he was also an Education Minister in his younger years.

Manase Yuma Amuku (Ayivu Chief) was elected the 4th Agofe of Lugbara Kari on 13 July 2023 but declared Agofe on 26 January 2024. He retained his election opponent Ismail Tuku as Epife (Prime Minister) though later replaced him with Elly Ejiku Emo. Yuma's home is in Angorovu Cell, Pajulu Ward of Arua City. (Prime Minister of a rebel faction) Tuku and members of the cabinet declared Yuma deposed in 2025 and declared Angelo Pati the new Agofe, a declaration which was rejected by Yuma as unconstitutional and illegitimate. He died on 26 October 2026.

== See also ==
- Lugbara language
