= Simon Baru XI =

King of the Madi Kingdom since 2024

- Opi Suru

Lopirigo of Madi
- Reign: 23 August 2024 – present
- Predecessor: Drani Stephen Izakare

Chief of the Pakile Clan
- Reign: 2023 – present
- Predecessor: Kamilo Baru X
- Born: 1958 (age 67–68)
- Religion: Christian

Simon Baru XI (born 1958) is the reigning Lopirigo (king or paramount chief) of the Madi Kingdom and people in northern Uganda, as well as the reigning chief of the Pakile clan. He has reigned since 2024, when he was elected to the throne following the deposition of Drani Stephen Izakare, who had reigned since 2011.

== Life and family ==
Simon Baru was born in 1958 as the son of Kamilo Baru X, the hereditary chief of the Pakile Clan, one of the 26 clans of the Madi people. He worked as a police officer during the 1970s, before joining the civil service in the 1980s. He subsequently became a local government official, holding various administrative posts within the Madi region.

Baru is married and has multiple children.

=== Reign ===
In 2023, following the death of his father, Baru became chief of the Pakile clan. The same year a constitutional convention adopted a written constitution for the Madi Kingdom and dethroned the reigning Lopirigo, Drani Stephen Izakare, who was under arrest for attempted murder. Baru was elected the new Lopirigo at the royal election held the next year, winning 11 of 21 votes cast. During Baru's reign, the Madi Kingdom was finally formally recognised and gazetted by the Ugandan government.
