= Moses Stephen Owor =

King of the Adhola Kingdom since 1999

Kwar Adhola
- Reign: 7 August 1999 – present
- Coronation: 7 August 1999
- Predecessor: Monarchy established
- Born: 25 February 1926 (age 100); Nagongera, Tororo District, Uganda
- Spouse: Cecilia Owor (m. 1951; died 2012)
- Issue: 10
- Father: Mzee Wilbrod Othieno
- Mother: Norah Nyanganda
- Religion: Christian

Moses Stephen Owor (born 25 February 1926) is the first Kwar Adhola, or king, of the Adhola Kingdom in Uganda. He has reigned over the Adhola people since the establishment of the Adhola monarchy in 1999.

== Early life and family ==
Moses Stephen was born on 25 February 1926 the town of Nagongera in Tororo District in eastern Uganda, then a British protectorate. He was born to Mzee Wilbrod Othieno and Norah Nyanganda, a daughter of the Adhola people's last pre-colonial king, Majanga, who had been deposed by Britain in 1904.

He attended St. Joseph's Primary School in Nagongera and was at a young age adopted by Mark Owor. He subsequently attended Tororo College. Following graduation, he would be employed by the Ministry of Labour as an inspector. He would eventually rise to the position of permanent secretary in the ministry.

In 1951, Moses Stephen married his wife Cecilia. Their marriage later 61 years before her death in 2012, with them having 10 children together.

== Reign ==
The restoration of Uganda's monarchies in 1993 opened the possibility for the establishment of a monarchy for the Adhola people. In 1998, Moses Stephen Owor, as a grandson of King Majanga, was unanimously elected to the newly created position of Kwar Adhola, the supreme cultural head of the Adhola people. Moses Stephen was formally crowned and enthroned as monarch on 7 August 1999, aged 73.

As monarch, Moses Stephen has promoted unity and cooperation among the Adhola people and across ethnic lines. In 2024 he celebrated his silver jubilee, and in 2026 turned 100 years old, to large celebrations across Padhola.
