= General Assembly of Madi =

- Emblem of Madi

Type
- Type: Unicameral

Leadership
- Speaker: Dramundu Dominic

Structure
- Seats: 41
- Political groups: Council of Chiefs (26): Clan Chiefs (26); Social representatives (15): Youth (9); Women (3); Disabled (3); Presiding Officer: Speaker (1)

Elections
- Voting system: Election and heredity

Meeting place
- Moyo People's Hall; Moyo, Uganda

The General Assembly of Madi is the legislature of the Madi Kingdom, one of the seventeen officially recognised traditional kingdoms in Uganda.

The General Assembly consists of the Council of Chiefs, who are the hereditary chiefs of the 26 clans within the Kingdom, as well as 15 elected representatives, 5 from each district within Madi, with 3 being women, 9 youth, and 3 disabled. The General Assembly is charged with legislating by-laws, legislating on cultural matters and scrutinising the kingdom's government. As a cultural legislature, it is prevented from legislating on political matters.

The Prime Minister of Madi is appointed by the Lopirigo, with the consent of the general assembly. The assembly may remove the prime minister from office by a two-thirds majority. The assembly may also dethrone the Lopirigo for cause by a two-thirds majority.

The General Assembly meets at Moyo People's Hall, a historic colonial-era building in Moyo.
