= Kotido Airport =

Airport in Uganda

- IATA: N/A; ICAO: HUKO

Summary
- Airport type: Public
- Serves: Kotido, Uganda
- Elevation AMSL: 4,070 ft / 1,241 m
- Coordinates: 2°57′10″N 34°07′22″E

Map
- Location of the airport in Uganda

Runways
| Direction | Length | | Surface |
| Direction | m | ft | Surface |
|---|---|---|---|
| 06/24 | 1,600 | 5,249 | Dirt |
- Sources: SkyVector Google Maps

Kotido Airport (ICAO: HUKO) is a small civilian airport that serves the town of Kotido in Uganda. The airport is 6 kilometres (3.7 mi) south of the town and has a single unpaved runway.

== See also ==
- Civil Aviation Authority of Uganda
- Transport in Uganda
- List of airports in Uganda
