= Kotido =

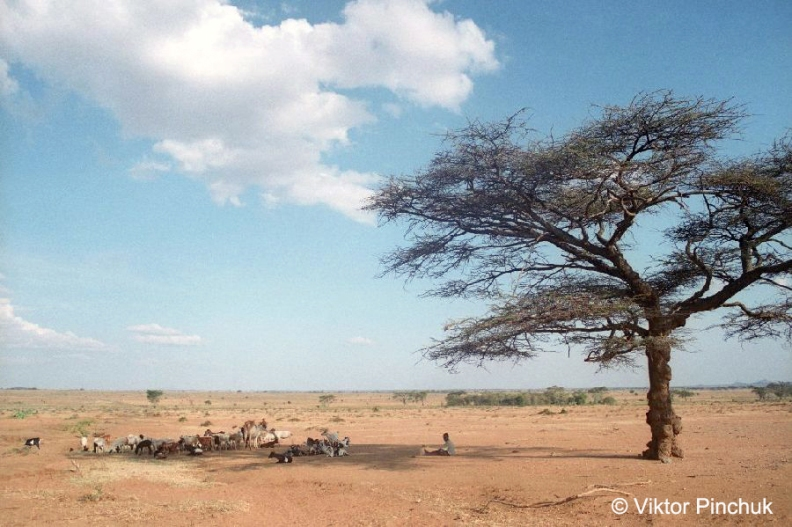
- Kotido

- Map of Uganda showing the location of Kotido.
- Coordinates: 03°00′22″N 34°06′45″E
- Country: Uganda
- Region: Northern Region of Uganda
- Sub-region: Karamoja sub-region
- District: Kotido District
- Elevation: 1,260 m (4,130 ft)

Population (2024 Census)
  - Total: 53,888
- Time zone: UTC+3 (EAT)

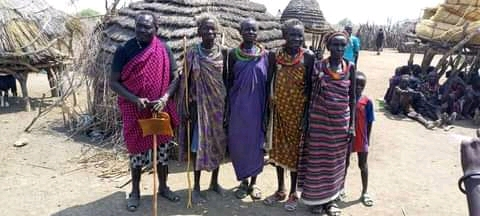
Homes in Kotido

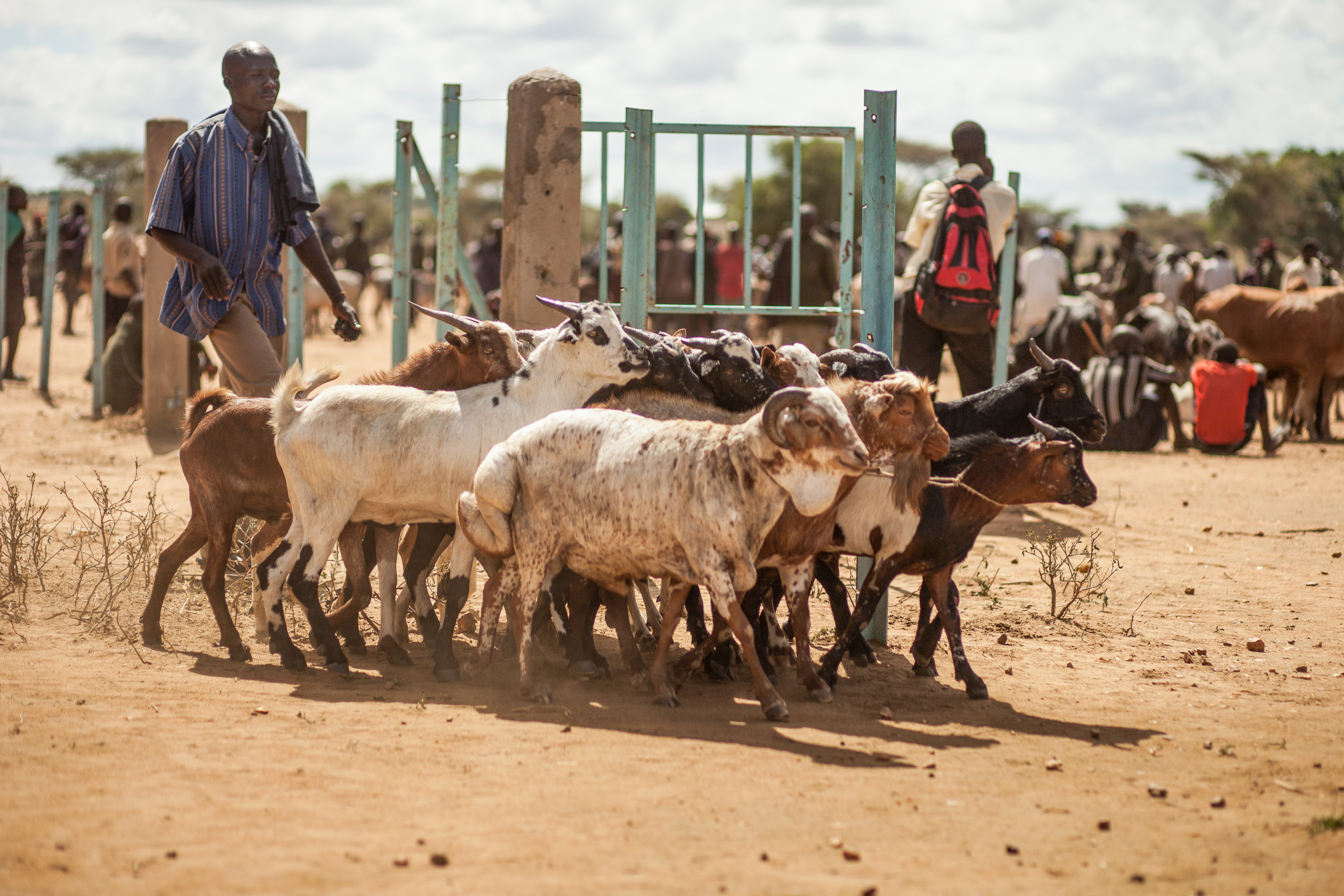
Goat rearing in Kotido

Kotido is a town in the Northern Region of Uganda. It is the chief municipal, administrative, and commercial center of the Kotido District and the site of the district headquarters.

== Location ==
Kotido lies approximately 107 kilometres (66 mi) northwest of Moroto, the largest urban centre in the Karamoja sub-region and 479 kilometres (298 mi) northeast of Kampala, Uganda's capital and largest city. The coordinates of the town are 3°00'21.6"N, 34°06'45.0"E (Latitude:3.0060; Longitude:34.1125).

== Population ==
The 2002 national census estimated the population of the town of Kotido at 12,900. The Uganda Bureau of Statistics (UBOS) estimated the population at 21,500 in 2010. In 2011, UBOS estimated the mid-year population at 22,900.

== Points of interest ==
The following additional points of interest lie within the town limits or close to the edges of towne:

- offices of Kotido Town Council
- Kotido central market
- Kotido Airport, a civilian airport administered by the Civil Aviation Authority of Uganda
- confluence of three major roads in the center of Kotido:
  - Kaabong-Kotido road
  - Kotido-Moroto road
  - Kotido-Pader-Palwo road
- headquarters of the Roman Catholic Diocese of Kotido.

== Mars crater ==
On October 24, 2017 a crater on Mars was named after the town.

== See also ==
- Karimojong
- List of cities and towns in Uganda
