= Nagongera =

- Map of Uganda showing the location of Nagongera
- Coordinates: 00°46′12″N 34°01′34″E
- Country: Uganda
- Region: Eastern Uganda
- District: Tororo District
- Elevation: 1,136 m (3,727 ft)

Population (2020 Estimate)
  - Total: 14,300
- Time zone: UTC+3 (EAT)

Nagongera is a town in Tororo District, in the Eastern Region of Uganda.

== Location ==
Nagongera is located approximately 26.5 kilometres (16 mi) west of Tororo, the location of the district headquarters. This is about 46 kilometres (29 mi) south-west of Mbale, the largest city in the Eastern Region of Uganda. Nagongera is approximately 261 kilometres (162 mi) north-east of Kampala, the capital and largest city of Uganda. The coordinates of the town are 00°46'12.0"N, 34°01'34.0"E (Latitude:0.7700; Longitude:34.0261). Nagongera Town Council sits at an average elevation of 1,136 metres (3,727 ft) above mean sea level.

== Population ==
In 2014, the national census and household survey enumerated the population of Nagongera at 12,341.

In 2015, the Uganda Bureau of Statistics (UBOS), estimated the population of Nagongera Municipal Council at 12,600. In 2020, the population agency estimated the mid-year population of the municipality at 14,300 people. Of these, 7,300 (51 percent) were females and 7,000 (49 percent) were males. UBOS calculated the population growth rate of Nagongera Town to average 2.56 percent annually, between 2015 and 2020.

== Overview ==
Nagongera attained municipality status in 2006. Up until that time, the town had no piped running water. That year, the Directorate of Water Development of the Uganda Ministry of Water and Environment, started the piped water project for Nagongera, using capital of USh700 million (about US$200,000 at that time).

== Points of interest ==
The following points of interest lie in or near Nagongera:

1. The offices of Nagongera Town Council

2. Nagongera Central Market

3. Nagongera Train Station

4. The town of Nagongera is the location of one of the campuses of Busitema University, a public university in Uganda.

5. Nagongera Health Centre IV

== Notable Resident ==
- Paskar Owor, middle-distance runner

== See also ==
- List of cities and towns in Uganda
