= Prime Minister of Kumam =

Head of government of the Kingdom of Kumam

- Coat of Arms of Kumam

- Flag of Kumam
- Incumbent; Samuel Eyenga since 9 August 2023
- Style: The Right Honourable
- Appointer: The Won Ateker
- Term length: At His Royal Highness' pleasure

The Prime Minister of Kumam is the head of government of the Kingdom of Kumam, one of the 17 recognised traditional kingdoms within Uganda. The Prime Minister is subordinate to and appointed by the monarch of Kumam, the Won Ateker. The Prime Minister chairs the Kumam cabinet of ministers and exercises the day-to-day governance of the kingdom on behalf of the monarch.

Though appointed by and subordinate to the Won Ateker, prior to appointment the Prime Minister must be vetted and approved by the Council of Elders, the monarch's advisory council.
