= Etomeileng III =

King of the Teso Kingdom since 2022

- Father of the Iteso

Emorimor of Teso
- Reign: 2 March 2022 – present
- Coronation: 22 October 2022
- Predecessor: Augustine Osuban

Ekirigi of Teso
- In office 8 May 2010 – 16 November 2019
- Monarch: Augustine Osuban
- Preceded by: Robert Ahimelech Irigei
- Succeeded by: Augustine Omare Okurut
- Born: 11 April 1962 (age 64); Malaba, Tororo District, Uganda
- Spouse: Akaliat Juliet Among
- Religion: Christian

Etomeileng III (Paul Sande Emolot; born 11 April 1962) is the reigning Emorimor (king) of the Teso Kingdom and people in Uganda. He has reigned since 2022, when he was elected to the throne following the death of Augustine Osuban, who had reigned since 1998.

== Early life and family ==
Paul Sande Emolot was born on 11 April 1962 in Koitangiro, on the outskirts of the town of Malaba in Tororo District of eastern Uganda. He worked as a commercial farmer and businessman, being elected mayor of Tororo in the early 2000s. He is married to Akaliat Juliet Among.

During Christmas in 2016 one of Emolot's son's, Ronald Ebere Emolot, was murdered outside the Emolot famliy home.

== Teso politics ==
=== Prime Minister ===
An ethnic Iteso, Emolot was involved with the government of the Teso Kingdom. Emolot was appointed Prime Minister of Teso in May 2010 by Emorimor Augustine Osuban, a position he held until 2019, when he was replaced by Augustine Omare Okurut.

=== Reign ===
Following the death of Emorimor Augustine Osuban on 5 February 2022, Emolot was declared interim Emorimor on 2 March. Emolot was subsequently elected Emorimor for life taking the regnal name Etomelieng III. His election was disputed by a rival faction of the Teso court. Following court orders and injunctions, Etomelieng was crowned as Emorimor on 22 October 2022, and subsequently recognised by the Ugandan government. The final court challenge against Etomeileng's reign was withdrawn in February 2026.
