= Teso Kingdom =

Traditional kingdom in Uganda

Kingdom of Teso Obuemorimor bwa Iteso (Ateso)
- Flag Coat of arms
- Anthem: Ekosio Loka Einos Loka Iteso (English: "Anthem of the Iteso Land")
- Location of the Teso Kingdom (red) in Uganda (white)
- Status: Traditional kingdom
- Capital: Soroti
- Official languages: Ateso, English
- Ethnic groups: Iteso
- Demonym: Iteso
- Government: Constitutional monarchy
  - Monarch: Etomeileng III
  - Prime Minister: Andrew Ocole
- Legislature: Ariabet

Establishment
  - Established: 1995

Area
  - Total: 10,303 km^{2} (3,978 sq mi)

Population
  - 2024 census: 2,171,665
  - Density: 210.78/km^{2} (545.9/sq mi)
- Currency: Ugandan shilling
- Time zone: UTC+3
- Calling code: 256

The Kingdom of Teso, also known as Iteso, is one of the 17 officially recognised and gazetted traditional kingdoms in Uganda. Located in eastern Uganda, the kingdom was coterminous with the Teso sub-region, until the 2022 secession of the Kumam Kingdom. The kingdom is the home of the Teso people, who constitute roughly 6.8% of Uganda's total populaiton, though significant Iteso populations live outside the kingdom's borders.

Under Ugandan law, Teso is recognised as a purely cultural institution without political power. The Teso government's powers are limited to tasks such as promoting and protecting tradition, cultural autonomy, popular participation, community development and fostering unity among the people of the region. The Teso government, through grants from the Ugandan central government, private donations and revenue from lands owned by the crown, operates development programs and institutions to improve the standard of living for Iteso people.

== History ==
The Iteso people are believed to have migrated south into modern-day Uganda in multiple waves from the 14th century. Under the leadership of the legendary conqueror Oduk, the Iteso conquered large swaths of territory, extending into modern-day Kenya

In the late 19th century, Teso was conquered by Buganda, and thereby became part of the British Uganda protectorate. Under British administration, the region was organised as the Teso District and was administered by a British-appointed District Commissioner.

In the post-independence period, under the government of Milton Obote, many Iteso were granted commissions in the Ugandan Army and administrative posts in the government, giving them sizable influence. Many Teso were subsequently purged from the army and state administration during the government of Idi Amin, before returning to their posts upon Obote's return to power in 1980.

The Teso again became marginalised following the overthrow of Obote and the subsequent government of general Tito Okello by Yoweri Museveni's National Resistance Movement during the Ugandan Bush War. The dismissal of many Teso soldiers and officers from the army triggered the Teso Insurgency, as they formed the Uganda People's Army in 1987 in opposition to the Museveni government.

=== Formation of the kingdom ===
The UPA's insurgency lasted until 1992, when a comprehensive peace process brought an end to the conflict. In the following year, 1993, the Ugandan government formally restored the monarchies abolished in 1967 by Obote. In an effort to reunify the region after the insurgency, consultations subsequently started about the formation of a Teso monarchy to act as a cultural custodian and mediator.

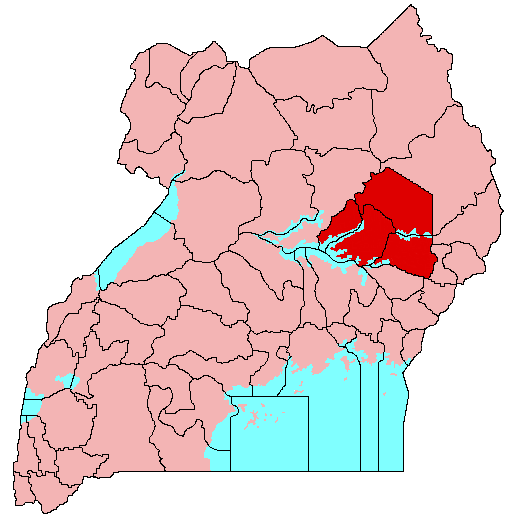
Teso before the secession of Kumam in 2022

In 1995 these consultations resulted in the formation of the Iteso Cultural Union and a paramount chieftaincy with the title Emorimor, which roughly translates to mediator. Paphras Imodot, who had taken the initiative to form the union, was declared the first emorimor. In 1998, he voluntarily relinquished the throne in favour of Augustine Osuban Lemukol, who was unanumously acclaimed by an assembly of 2000.

Augustine Osuban reigned as Emorimor until 2022, when he passed away at the age of 88. Later that year, after a succession dispute, Paul Sande Emolot was acclaimed as Emorimor, taking the regnal name Etomeileng III.

2022 also saw, after a decade of agitation, the Kumam people peacefully seceded from Teso, establishing their own kingdom, which was recognised by the Ugandan state. The movement for Kumam independence had started in 2011 and was fueled by a sense of neglect and indifference towards the Kumam community by the Teso government. The secession was recognised by the Teso government, with Emorimor Etomeileng III visiting Kumam in 2024 as a mark of friendship between the kingdoms.

== Government ==
Teso is organised as a constitutional monarchy. Supreme executive power is vested in the Emorimor as head of state, and exercised on a day-to-day basis on his behalf by the Executive Council, which is led by the Ekirigi (prime minister). The executive council consists of the Ekirigi and the other ministers and deputy ministers of the government, all of whom are appointed by the Emorimor.

The Ariabet (Council) is the legislature of the kingdom, tasked with policy making and legislative oversight over the government. The Ariabet consists of the members of the Executive Council, the chairpersons of the district executive committees, one representative from each sub-county, and three society representatives from each district.

Teso is an elective monarchy, with the Emorimor being an elective position. Holders are elected for life, with each of the four regions of Teso expected to take turns in providing the Emorimor.
