= Lawirwodi of Acholi =

Title of the king of Acholi, Uganda

- Coat of Arms of Acholiland

Incumbent
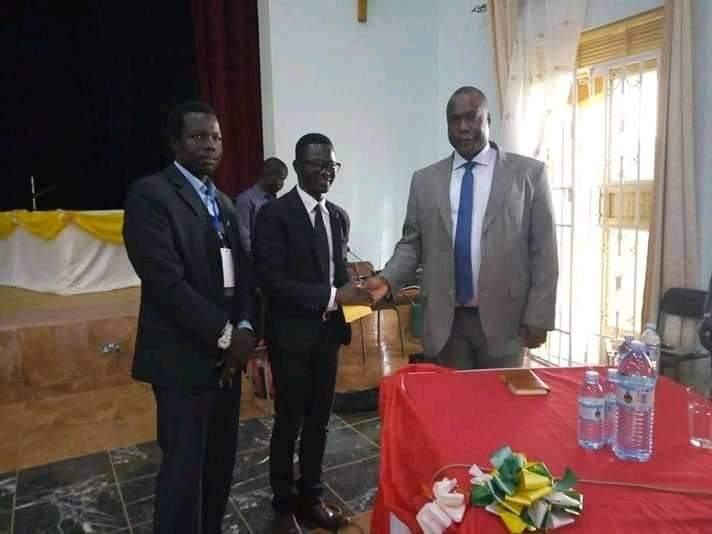
- Acana II (right)
- David Acana II since 1999

Details
- Style: His Royal Highness
- First monarch: Mateo Lamot
- Formation: 1950
- Abolition: 17 September 1967 – 1999
- Website: www.kerkwaroacholi.org

The Lawirwodi of Acholi is the ruler and paramount chief of the Acholi Kingdom in northern Uganda. As paramount chief, the Lawirwodi serves as the unifying cultural and traditional leader of the Acholi people and is elected for life by and from the hereditary chiefs of the Acholi. The title Lawirwodi literally translates as leading chief or paramount chief.

== History ==
The Acholi monarchy came into existence in 1950. The British colonial administration was at this time reformed, with the office of the British-appointed District Commissioner abolished and replaced as the head of the Acholi district government by the new post of Lawirwodi, to be elected by and from the Acholi chiefs. In 1959 the position was renamed Laloyo Maber (literally "good ruler") simultaneously as its political powers were largely removed, transitioning it from a political office to a ceremonial cultural position. Upon Uganda's independence in 1962, the Laloyo Maber was officially recognised as the "constitutional head" of the Acholi district within Uganda's new federal framework, making the Laloyo Maber eligible for election as President of Uganda.

Prime Minister Milton Obote overthrew Kabaka Mutesa II of Buganda, who was serving as Uganda's ceremonial President, during the Mengo Crisis in 1966. Uganda was subsequently declared a republic on 17 September 1967, with all the country's monarchies, including that of Acholi, being abolished.

The Ugandan government under Yoweri Museveni restored Uganda's monarchies in 1993, but due to the Lord's Resistance Army insurgency the Acholi monarchy would not be restored before in 1999. Godfrey Acana I, the chief of the largest Acholi clan, the Payia, was subsequently crowned as paramount chief, resurrecting the original title of Lawirwodi. Following his death only a few months later, his son was proclaimed the new Lawirwodi as David Acana II, being formally crowned in 2005.

== Election ==
The Acholi Kingdom operates with an uncodified constitution, based on precedent, tradition and custom. The Lawirwodi is elected by the chiefs of the Acholi clans from among their own numbers, and serves for life.

== Political power ==
As head of state of the Acholi Kingdom the Lawirwodi exercises significant powers over the government of the kingdom. The Lawirwodi appoints the Acholi Prime Minister and the members of the Acholi cabinet. Ugandan law however prohibits traditional monarchs from exercising political powers or being involved in politics, as such relegating the kingdoms to cultural and development matters.

== List of Lawirwodi ==
- Mateo Lamot (1950–1953)
- Phillip Adonga (1953–1967)
- Godfrey Acana I (1999)
- David Acana II (1999 - present)
