= Acholi Kingdom =

Traditional kingdom in Uganda

Acholi Kingdom Ker Kwaro Acholi (Acholi)
- Flag Coat of arms
- Anthem: Lubaro me Acholi (English: "Acholi Anthem")
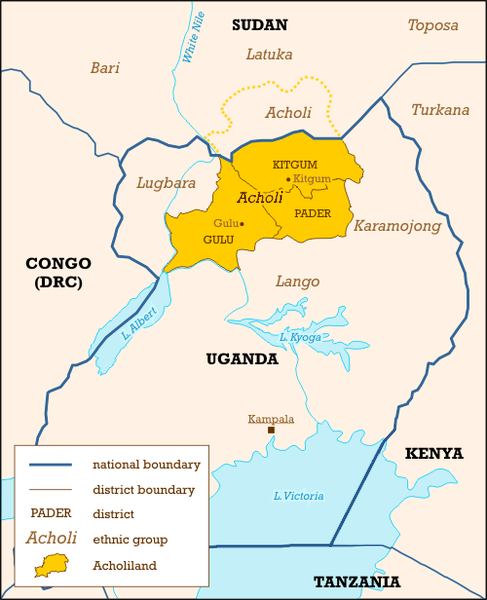
- Location of Acholi Kingdom (yellow) in Uganda (Tan)
- Status: Traditional kingdom
- Capital: Gulu
- Official languages: Acholi, English
- Ethnic groups: Acholi
- Demonym: Acholi
- Government: Federal constitutional monarchy
  - Monarch: David Acana II
  - Prime Minister: Michael Otim
- Legislature: Council of Chiefs

Establishment
  - Established: 1950
  - Uganda gains independence from the United Kingdom: 9 October 1962
  - Monarchy abolished by Obote: 17 September 1967
  - Monarchy restored: 1999

Area
  - Total: 28,522 km^{2} (11,012 sq mi)

Population
  - 2024 census: 2,044,355
  - Density: 71.68/km^{2} (185.7/sq mi)
- Currency: Ugandan shilling
- Time zone: UTC+3
- Calling code: 256

The Acholi Kingdom, also known as Acholiland, is one of the 17 officially recognised traditional kingdoms in Uganda. Located in northern Uganda and coterminous with the Acholi sub-region, the kingdom is the home of the Acholi people, who constitute roughly 4.5% of Uganda's total populaiton. Acholiland is ruled by the Lawirwodi, who is the paramount chief of the over 50 chiefdoms within the kingdom.

Under Ugandan law, the kingdom is a cultural institution without political power, tasked with promoting trradition, popular participation and unity among the people of the region. The kingdom government, through grants from the Ugandan government and private donations, operates development programs and institutions to improve the standard of living for Acholi people.

== History ==
The Acholi people are estimated to have inhabited northern Uganda since at least the year 1000 AD. Acholi society has traditionally been decentralised, with society divided into the roughly 50 Acholi clans, each ruled by a hereditary Rwot.

The formation of a unified Acholi administration would not come about before the British colonial period. Britain established colonial administration over Acholiland in 1898, signing deals with numerous local Rwodi. In the following decades, the colonial administration would gradually implement a more centralised administrative system based on the Ganda model. These reforms included the establishment of an executive District Douncil, headed by a British-appointed District Commissioner, and a Council of Chiefs to advise on administration.

The Acholi monarchy came into being in 1950 when the office of District Commissioner was abolished. In its stead the office of Lawirwodi, or Paramount Chief, was established to chair the District Council. This office was both a ceremonial position with traditional authority as chief of chiefs, but also an executive post as head of the district government. The office was replaced in 1959 with that of Laloyo Maber (literally "Good Ruler"), which was intended to be a ceremonail post directly modelled on the Kabakaship in Buganda. Upon Ugandan independence in 1962, the Laloyo Maber was officially recognised as the "Constitutional Head" of the Acholi District, and as such one of the monarchical offices eligible for election to the Ugandan presidency.

The monarchies of Uganda, including that of Acholi, were abolished in 1967 by Prime Minister Milton Obote in the aftermath of the Mengo Crisis, whereupon Uganda became a republic. In the following decades Acholiland was ravaged by wars and conflict, particularly the Lord's Resistance Army insurgency from 1987.

Uganda's monarchies were restored by the government of president Yoweri Museveni in 1993. However, due to the conflict and instability in the region, the Acholi monarchy would not be restored until 1999. Restoration came with the coronation of Rwot Godfrey Acana I of Payira, the largest Acholi clan, as Lawirwodi. Upon Acana I's death, his son David Acana II was crowned the new Lawirwodi in 2005. Acana II's reign has focused heavily on reconciliation and reconstruction following the LRA insurgency in Acholiland.

== Government ==
The Acholi Kingdom is organised as a constitutional monarchy. The Lawirwodi serves as head of state and appoints a cabinet headed by a Prime Minister, who serves as the kingdom's head of government. The government is scrutinised by the Council of Chiefs, the kingdom's legislative and deliberative body, which consists of the hereditary chiefs of the 58 Acholi chiefdoms. Governance is decentralised, with each clan holding certain responsibilities and powers, which has led to the kingdom being described as operating on a federal model.

Acholiland operates with an uncodified constitution based on tradition, precedent and unwritten convention. There is however support for the drafting of a codified constitutional document for the kingdom.

== Demographics ==
As of 2024 Acholiland had a population of 2,044,355. There is a majority of women, with 51.8% of the population being female and 48.2% being men. 42.5% of the population is under the age of 14, while only 3.1% of the population is over the age of 65.

The Acholi are an overwhelmingly Christian people, with 2002 Census finding that an estimated 72.3% of Acholi are Roman Catholic, 23.6% are Anglican and 1.7% are Pentecostal. 0.8% of the population are Muslim, with 1.6% belonging to other or no faiths.
