= Bugwere Kingdom =

Traditional kingdom in Uganda

Kingdom of Bugwere Obwa Ikumbania bwa Bugwere (Lugwere)
- Flag Coat of arms
- Anthem: Bugwere Anthem
- Location of the Bugwere Kingdom (red) in Uganda (white)
- Status: Traditional kingdom
- Capital: Budaka
- Official languages: Lugwere, English
- Ethnic groups: Bagwere
- Demonyms: Mugwere (singular); Bagwere (plural)
- Government: Constitutional monarchy
  - Monarch: Geoffrey Wayabire II (disputed); Kintu Mubbala (disputed)
  - Prime Minister: Moses Joel Mugulusi
- Legislature: Isimoola

Establishment
  - Established: 2006

Area
  - Total: 1,926 km^{2} (744 sq mi)

Population
  - 2024 census: 1,037,108
  - Density: 538.48/km^{2} (1,394.7/sq mi)
- Currency: Ugandan shilling
- Time zone: UTC+3
- Calling code: 256

The Bugwere Kingdom is one of the 17 officially recognised traditional kingdoms in Uganda. Located in eastern Uganda, it is one of the four kingdoms within the Bukedi sub-region. It is the home of the Gwere people, who constitute roughly 1.9% of Uganda's total populaiton, though notable Bagwere communities exist outside the kingdom's borders.

Bugwere is formally recognised as a kingdom under Ugandan law. However, the Uganda constitution and Institution of Traditional or Cultural Leaders Act, 2011 define the kingdoms as purely cultural institution without political power. As such, the Bugwere government's powers are limited to tasks such as promoting and protecting tradition, cultural autonomy, popular participation, community development and fostering unity among the people of the region.

== History ==
According to myth, the Gwere people originated in Bunyoro during their reign of the Kitara Empire. When the Chwezi dynasty's rule over Kitara collapsed, the Bagwere people migrated east to their modern territories.

In the late 19th century, Bugwere was brought under British colonial rule, becoming part of the Protectorate of Uganda. It was administratively amalgamated with neighbouring territories to form the Bukedi district. Independence in 1962 did not result in the establishment of a Bagwere monarchy, unlike in many neighbouring territories though these were abolished in 1967 following the Mengo crisis.

The restoration of monarchies in 1993 and the Ugandan constitution of 1995 opened the possibility for the formation of a Gwere monarchy. In 2006 the Bugwere Kingdom was founded, with Kintu Mubbala proclaimed as the first Ikumbania. Mubala was however never crowned. Following the enactment of a new constitution for the kingdom in 2013, John Wayabire I was proclaimed Ikumbania and subsequently recognised by the Ugandan government.

Wayabire I died on 7 February 2021 from Covid-19. This triggered a succession dispute between Wayabire's son, Geoffrey Wayabire II, and Kintu Mubbala, who had never renounced his claim to the Gwere throne.

Following multiple years of mediation, an agreement between the two claimants in September 2026 set forth that an electoral process was to be implemented to solve the dispute, giving the heads of the 78 Bugwere clans the decision to elect an Ikumbania.

== Government ==
A constitutional monarchy, the Bugwere Kingdom is governed in accordance with the Kingdom's 2013 constitution, as amended in 2021. Supreme executive power is vested in the Ikumbania as head of state, and exercised on a day-to-day basis on his behalf by the Prime Minister. The prime minister chairs the cabinet of ministers.

Legislative authority is vested in the Isimoola, which is tasked with making policy and keeping oversight over the government. The Isimoola consists of elected representatives, known as Bakwenda

Bugwere is an elective monarchy, with the Ikumbania elected by and from among the 78 Clan chiefs.
