= Kumam people =

Ugandan ethnic group

Kaberamaido District

The Kumam people are an ethnic group in eastern Uganda, living mainly in Kaberamaido, Soroti, Kalaki and surrounding areas of the Lake Kyoga basin, with communities also in Dokolo and Amolatar. They speak the Kumam language, which the article describes as similar to the language spoken by the Lango and as containing Ateso vocabulary.

Traditional Kumam society was organised through clan leaders known as wegi Atekerin, who were responsible for administration, maintaining order and resolving political and social matters. Music, dance and oral storytelling also formed part of Kumam social life.

== Origin ==
The Kumam descend from the early fishing, agricultural, and herding communities of Ethiopia in 1560 AD or there about. Who migrated southwards towards Uganda because of land pressure around the 17th century. Today, they live on the shores of Lake Kyoga in the districts of Serere, Soroti and Kaberamaido

Kumam traditions say are part of the Iteso people. They probably lost part of their original Leno Dialect similar Dialect from Ethiopian Oromo region Ateker language and adopted some words from the Western Nilotic Luo spoken by their Lango neighbours who are also Hamaties| Hamatic People although the speak a language almost understandable by the Acholi neighbours – due to prolonged contact and intermarriages. The Kumam must have preceded the ITeso in migration and settled in Soroti later hence, the Karimojong people from whom Iteso came know Soroti by the name 'Solot' and not teso.This points to the possibility of a later migration after iteso from Karamoja.

== Culture and customs ==
=== Political set-up ===
The Kumam had political structure under clan leaders known as wegi Atekerin. Other people of importance in the society were wegi ikodeta Cel (leaders of dancing groups), and leaders of Asonya(ancient) homes, wegi Cel. The wegi Cel were in most cases Dogolan or Odonge ikekoros (heads of part of a clan descending form one man). These clan leaders were responsible for the maintenance of law and order as well as general administration. They arbitrated in matters of politics and social affairs.

In 2022, the Kumam established a centralised cultural kingdom under the Leadership of His Royal Highness the Won Ateker Papa Kumam, who is the supreme cultural leader of the Kumam people. He is elected from among the "Wegi Ibukui" or Clan Leaders of the different clans. The Wegi Ibukui together with the council of Elders Wegi Etok Me Kumam constitute the powerful Kumam cultural heritage or Etok me Kumam. The Kumam also have a cabinet appointed by HRH won Ateker Papa Kumam to oversee and manage the activities of the Cultural Institution - Etok Me Kumam on his behalf with a number of ministers, deputy prime ministers and prime minister.

The current Won Ateker Papa Kumam is Raphael Otaya who is the first elected monarch of the Kumam.

=== Social set-up ===
Music, dance and story telling played a big part in kumam lifestyle. At any time music would be made, at various functions, such as ceremonial, religious and political functions. In the evening, the old people would narrate stories to the younger generation as part of the oral traditions.

=== Marriage ===
Previously, the parents would arrange marriages for their children. Girls would be betrothed to boys at an early age. In effect, the young girl would become wife to a respective boy but she would wait to be officially handed over when she came of age. In some cases, the young girls so betrothed would be taken to the boy's home to grow up there. When she came of age, a ceremony would be organized to formalize the relationship. With time however the system changed. Today, the boy goes looking for a girl and without the consent of the parents and sneak with her to his home at night. After a week or so, the girl's relatives would begin to look for her. Obviously they had some prior knowledge of her whereabouts. On discovery, a fine would be exacted from the boy. Arrangements would be made to settle the bride wealth and the marriage would be formalized.

== See also ==
- Karamojong
- Teso
- Acholi
- Gisu
