= Kwar Adhola =

Title of the king of Padhola, Uganda

Kwar Adhola of the Jopadhola
- Coat of Arms of the Adhola Kingdom

Incumbent
- Moses Stephen Owor since 7 August 1999

Details
- Style: His Royal Highness
- First monarch: Moses Stephen Owor
- Formation: 1999
- Website: tadefo.org

The Kwar Adhola (Literally Grandfather of the Adhola) is the ruler and paramount chief of the Adhola Kingdom in eastern Uganda. As paramount chief and head of the kingdom, the Kwar Adhola serves as the unifying cultural and traditional leader of the Adhola people. The crown is elective, being elected for life by the hereditary chiefs of the 52 Adhola clans.

== History ==
The roots of the modern Adhola monarchy stretch back to the 17th century, when the Adhola clans were united under the paramountcy of the Nyapolo Ogule clan of Rwooth Ngoor I. The Nyapolo Ogule dynasty ruled until 1904 when its final king, Majanga, was deposed by the British and Adhola fully integrated into the Protectorate of Uganda.

The period of colonial rule and the post-independence era brought about internal tensions among the Adhola based on religion and clan differences. The restoration of Ugandan monarchies in 1993 opened the possibility for the restoration of old or establishment of new traditional and cultural institutions. In an effort to heal the internal divisions among the Adhola, a movement formed to create a unifying monarchy.

In 1998 Moses Stephen Owor, a maternal-line grandson of Padhola's last pre-colonial king, Majanga, was unanimously elected to be the first Adhola monarch. The formal coronation of the Kwar Adhola on 7 August 1999 marked the official proclamation of the kingdom.

== Powers ==
As head of state of the Adhola Kingdom, the Kwar Adhola exercises significant powers over the government of the realm. The Kwar Adhola appoints the prime minister, known as the Jago, as well as the members of the Adhola cabinet. The Kwar Adhola's signature is required to bring into effect all policies and directives, and as sovereign he also forms an integral component of the Supreme Assembly. Under Ugandan law, the traditional monarchs and kingdoms are prohibited from exercising political powers or being involved in politics. As such, the powers of the Kwar Adhola and of the Adhola Kingdom are relegated to cultural and development matters.
