= Adhola Kingdom =

Traditional kingdom in Uganda

Adhola Kingdom Tieng Adhola (Dhopadhola)
- Flag Coat of arms
- Motto: Peace, Unity and Development
- Anthem: Were Omaro Padhola (English: "God has blessed Padhola")
- Location of the Adhola Kingdom (Red) in Uganda (White)
- Status: Traditional kingdom
- Capital: Tororo
- Official languages: Dhopadhola, English
- Ethnic groups: Jopdahola
- Demonyms: Japadhola (singular); Jopadhola (plural)
- Government: Constitutional monarchy
  - Monarch: Moses Stephen Owor
  - Prime Minister: Obbo Richard Josel
- Legislature: Supreme Assembly

Establishment
  - Established: 1999

Area
  - Total: 1,194 km^{2} (461 sq mi)

Population
  - 2024 census: 609,939
  - Density: 510.8/km^{2} (1,323.0/sq mi)
- Currency: Ugandan shilling
- Time zone: UTC+3
- Calling code: 256

The Adhola Kingdom, also known as Padhola, is one of the 17 officially recognised traditional kingdoms in Uganda. Located in eastern Uganda, on the border with Kenya, its territory covers the Tororo District. The kingdom is the home of the Adhola people. The Adhola make up roughly 1.2% of Uganda's total populaiton. The kingdom is ruled by the Kwar Adhola, who is a supreme cultural leader of the Adhola people and the 52 clans.

Officially recognised and sanctioned by the Ugandan government, the kingdom is defined as a traditional cultural institution without political power under Ugandan law. The task of the institution is to promote tradition, popular participation and unity among the people of the region. The kingdom government, through grants from the Ugandan government and private donations, operates development programs and institutions to improve the standard of living for Adhola people.

== History ==
The Adhola people arrived in modern-day south-east Uganda during the 16th century during the Luo migrations. According to legend, the population descends from the legendary prince Adhola, who settled in the region. After settlement, the population was divided into self-governing clans, which operated semi-independently of one-another under a paramount chieftaincy of the Nyapolo Ogule clan. An Aadhola proto-state under Rwooth Ngoor I and his hereditary successors is supposed to have arisen during the 17th century. This Adhola proto-state existed Ngoor I's successors until the late 19th century, when Padhola was incorporated into the Protectorate of Uganda by the British, with Ngoor I's descendant, Rwooth Majanga, being deposed in 1904.

Padhola was subsequently placed under effective Baganda administration on behalf of the British, with the entire Bukedi region ruled by Semei Kakungulu. Local dissatisfaction with Kakungulu's rule lead to his replacement by a British commissioner in 1914. Indirect rule in Bukedi continuing through the various local chiefs, with Padhola becoming one of the district's counties.

Ugandan independence in 1962 brought about a federal system, with the constitution establishing Uganda as a monarchical federation where the ceremonial office of head of state would rotate between the kings and traditional leaders of the nation. Bukedi during this period established a short-lived monarchy to unite the different ethnic groups of the region, with Joseph Wasukulu crowned Senkulu of Bukedi. Uganda's monarchies, including that of Bukedi, were subsequently abolished in 1967 following the Mengo Crisis.

The government of president Yoweri Museveni formally restored Uganda's monarchies in 1993. The Bukedi monarchy, however, was not restored. Continued local wishes for cultural leadership however laid the groundwork for the modern Adhola monarchy to come into being in 1999. In 1998, in the lead-up the kingdom's formal foundation, Moses Stephen Owor, a grandson of Rwooth Majanga, the final ruler of the pre-colonial Padhola state, was unanumously declared the cultural figurehead of the Adhola people by the 52 clan chiefs, and a provisional Adhola governemnt was formed. the Adhola Kingdom was formally proclaimed on 7 August 1999, when Moses Stephen Owor was officially crowned as Kwar Adhola.

== Government ==
The Adhola Kingdom, under the provisions of its 2006 constitution, operates as a constitutional monarchy with a parliamentary system. The Kwar Adhola serves as head of state and is defined by the constitution as the Supreme Cultural Leader and foremost representative of the Adhola people. An elective monarchy, the Kwar Adhola is elected for life from among and by the clan chiefs and must be at least 50 years old.

Day-to-day government is carried out by the prime minister, who holds the title of Jago, and the cabinet. The Jago and other members of the cabinet are appointed by the Kwar Adhola. The kingdom operates under a parliamentary system, whereby the Jago and cabinet are jointly responssible to the monarch while also being required to maintain the confidence of the legislature, the Supreme Assembly.

The Supreme Assembly is the kingdom's legislature. The supreme assembly sets policy and scrutinises the government. Its membership consits of the Kwar Adhola, the Jago and other ministers, the chiefs of the 52 clans, and 3 elected representatives from each clan.

In addition to being members of the supreme assembly, the 52 clan chiefs also form the Council of Clan Leaders, an advisory body or privy council to the Kwar Adhola. The Council is tasked with advising the monarch on cultural tradition and ceremony, and with suggesting legislation to the supreme assembly.
