= Emorimor of Teso =

Title of the king of Teso, Uganda

- Coat of Arms of Teso

Incumbent
- Etomeileng III since 22 October 2022

Details
- Style: His Royal Highness
- Formation: 1995
- Residence: Teso Royal Palace
- Website: tesokingdom.org

The Emorimor of Teso (meaning roughly The Mediator in Ateso) is the constitutional monarch of the Teso Kingdom, one of the 17 officially recognised traditional kingdoms in Uganda. The Emorimor serves as a unifying cultural figure for the Teso people in both Uganda and in Kenya. The crown is elective for life, with the current king, Etomeileng III, being elected unopposed to the throne following the death of Augustine Osuban Lemukol in 2022.

== Political power ==
Ugandan law prohibits traditional monarchs from exercising political powers or being involved in politics. As such the powers of the Emorimor and the Teso Kingdom are relegated to cultural and development matters. However, as head of state of Teso, the Emorimor exercises significant power over the government of the kingdom. He appoints the Teso Prime Minister, known as the Ekirigi, and the other members of the Executive Council.

== Style and title ==
The principal title of the monarch is Emorimor of Teso, which represents their position as the sovereign and head of state of the Teso Kingdom. Accompanying the title is the style of Royal Highness. The Emorimor's secondary title is that of Papa Iteso, meaning Father of the Iteso. This title represents the Emorimor's position as the ultimate cultural leader and father figure of the Teso people. The titles are often combined into one as Emorimor Papa Iteso.

== List of Emorimor ==
- Paphrus Edimu Imodot (1995–1997)
- Augustine Kadugula Osuban (1997–2022)
- Paul Sande Emolot Etomeileng III (2022–present)
