= Orukurato Orukuru (Bunyoro) =

Royal Parliament of Bunyoro-Kitara Orukurato Orukuru (Nyoro)
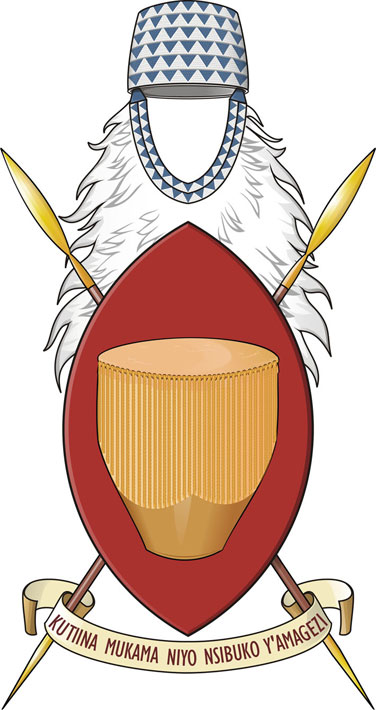
- Coat of arms of Bunyoro

Type
- Type: Unicameral

Leadership
- Speaker: Vacant
- Seats: Dissolved

Elections
- Voting system: Election and Appointment by the Omukama

Meeting place
- Rukurato Hall; Masindi, Uganda

The Orukurato Orukuru (often called simply the Rukurato, and Royal Parliament or Royal Supreme Council in English) is the Parliament of the Kingdom of Bunyoro-Kitara.

The Royal Parliament is today convened at Rurukato Hall in Masindi. Parliament has been dissolved since 2023 and not been reconvened, in the midst of a political crisis. The body is chaired by the speaker and usually consists of elected representatives of Bunyoro's sub-countries, as well as civil society groups and clan chiefs. The Rukurato is charged with legislating by-laws of the kingdom, legislate on cultural matters and with scrutinising the royal government, but it is prevented from legislating on political matters.
