= Shoshana Nambi =

Shoshana Nambi is the first female rabbi from Uganda; she was ordained in 2024 by the Hebrew Union College – Jewish Institute of Religion in New York. She currently serves as the assistant rabbi at Congregation Beth Am in Los Altos Hills, California.

== Early life and education ==
Nambi has said that she was born in Kenya and went to Uganda when she was young. She grew up in Eastern Uganda, in the Abayudaya community, and has said she had a bat mitzvah when she was 18.

Nambi studied for a year at the Pardes Institute of Jewish Studies, and later enrolled at Hebrew Union College – Jewish Institute of Religion (HUC-JIR), spending her first year at the Jerusalem campus before continuing her studies in New York City. She was the first Ugandan female rabbinic student at HUC-JIR.

== Career ==
Nambi is the author of the children’s book The Very Best Sukkah: A Story from Uganda, which is about the celebration of Sukkot in her home community. The book, published by Kalaniot Books in 2022, received a 2023 National Jewish Book Award and was named a Sydney Taylor Honor Book.

Nambi was ordained in 2024 by the Hebrew Union College – Jewish Institute of Religion in New York City, making her the first Ugandan woman to be ordained as a rabbi, and the second member and first female member of the Abayudaya community to be ordained as a rabbi in the United States, with the first being Gershom Sizomu.

She now serves as the assistant rabbi in Congregation Beth Am in Los Altos Hills, California.

== Awards and honors ==
The children’s book Nambi authored, The Very Best Sukkah: A Story from Uganda, received a 2023 National Jewish Book Award and was named a Sydney Taylor Honor Book.

In 2023, Nambi was named as one of New York Jewish Week’s “36 to Watch”.

== See also ==
- Abayudaya
- Ugandan Americans
