= Israel–Uganda relations =

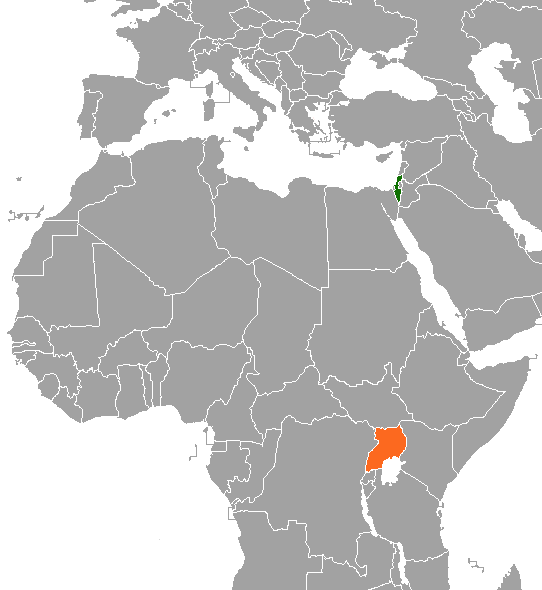
- Israel: Uganda

Israel–Uganda relations refers to the current and historical relationship between Israel and Uganda. Neither country has a resident ambassador. Uganda has a non-resident ambassador in Cairo.

== History ==
In 1903, the British Uganda Programme proposed Uganda as a Homeland for the Jewish people. The British plan was promoted to Theodor Herzl by Colonial Secretary Joseph Chamberlain as a potential refuge for Jews fleeing antisemitic violence in Eastern Europe, particularly following the 1903 anti-Jewish Kishinev pogrom. Opposition from both Zionists and white settlers in East Africa ultimately led to the withdrawal of the offer in 1905.

=== 1967–70 ===
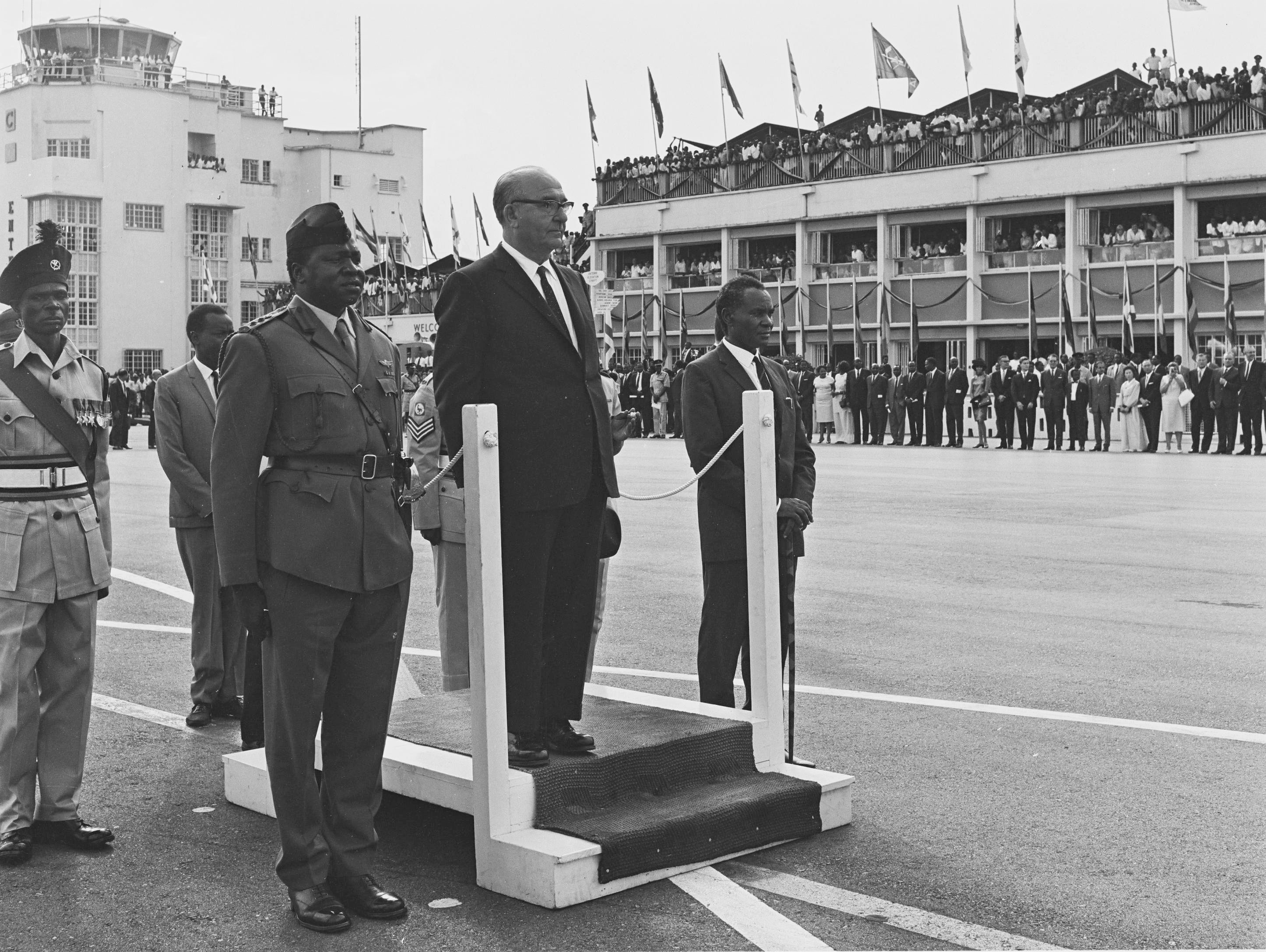
Prime Minister Levi Eshkol welcomed in Uganda by Idi Amin, 1966

Under Milton Obote, whose first term in office ran from 1966 to 1971, Uganda initially helped Israel support the Anyanya rebels in Southern Sudan during their long war with the north. After the 1967 Six-Day War, however, Obote wanted to make peace with the Khartoum government and cut off support for the rebels.

Israeli diplomat Uri Lubrani served as Israeli ambassador to Uganda from1964 until 1967. While Obote grew increasingly hostile to Israel, his army commander General Idi Amin, shared an ethnic connection with the people of Southern Sudan and a personal affinity for Israel, and bypassed Obote. Lubrani developed a close relationship with Idi Amin when the two of them survived a military aircraft crash together in Uganda, and Amin publicly declared Lubrani to be his "blood brother."

=== 1971 ===
When Idi Amin overthrew Obote in 1971, he resumed backing the rebels and continued the military relationship with Israel.

Amin visited Israel in 1971 and was toasted by Israeli Defence Minister Moshe Dayan, celebrating their military cooperation. The Israelis supplied and trained much of the Uganda Army (1962–1971) Ugandan Army and undertook several construction projects in the country, including upgrading the Entebbe International Airport.

=== 1972–92 ===
But in February 1972, Amin suddenly decided to visit Libya (while traveling on an Israeli jet) and meet with leader Colonel Gaddafi, where he was bribed with a massive cash and financial aid offer from Libya. After the visit, Amin became vocally anti-Israel.

By March 1972, Amin had ordered all Israelis expelled from Uganda. One report says Amin became enraged over Israel's refusal to supply Uganda with jets for a war with neighboring Tanzania. Amin became an outspoken critic of Israel. By the end of the month, all 470 Israelis had gone, including some who had driven all their valuable construction equipment across the border into Kenya.

=== 1993–present ===
Following the 1993 Oslo Accords between Israel and the PLO, on July 29, 1994, Uganda and Israel officially restored diplomatic relations.President Museveni began making state visits to Jerusalem (in 2003 and 2011).Private Israeli security firms, agricultural experts, and technology companies slowly returned to the country.The Ugandan military began sending officers to Israel for elite counter-terrorism and intelligence training. In July 2016 when Benjamin Netanyahu visited Uganda, it was the first visit by a sitting Israeli Prime Minister to sub-Saharan Africa in decades.

In 2016, an Israeli company, the Haifa-based Israeli firm Tzamir Architects and City Planning, was chosen by the Ugandan government to make a national master plan for the overhaul and development of Uganda, on the basis of the Israeli National Outline Plan system, namely National Outline Plan 35. The master planning initiative advanced from a blueprint into official state policy, Uganda’s first-ever National Physical Development Plan (NPDP) 2018–2040, focusing on balancing urban growth corridors with protected agricultural blocks and natural reserves.

== Agricultural cooperation ==
In a joint Israeli–Ugandan project, a professor from the Hebrew University of Jerusalem's Faculty of Agriculture conducted a survey of Lake Victoria with a Ugandan colleague from Makerere University. They found that Nile perch, introduced by the British sixty years ago, have decimated native fish populations, leading to malnutrition in the lakeside communities. She helped to set up artificial fish ponds to raise carp, which had disappeared from the local diet. The United States Agency for International Development sponsored the digging of the ponds and sent villagers to Kibbutz HaMa'apil in Emek Hefer to learn spawning techniques. Graduates of the training program established carp farms.

== Diplomatic visits ==
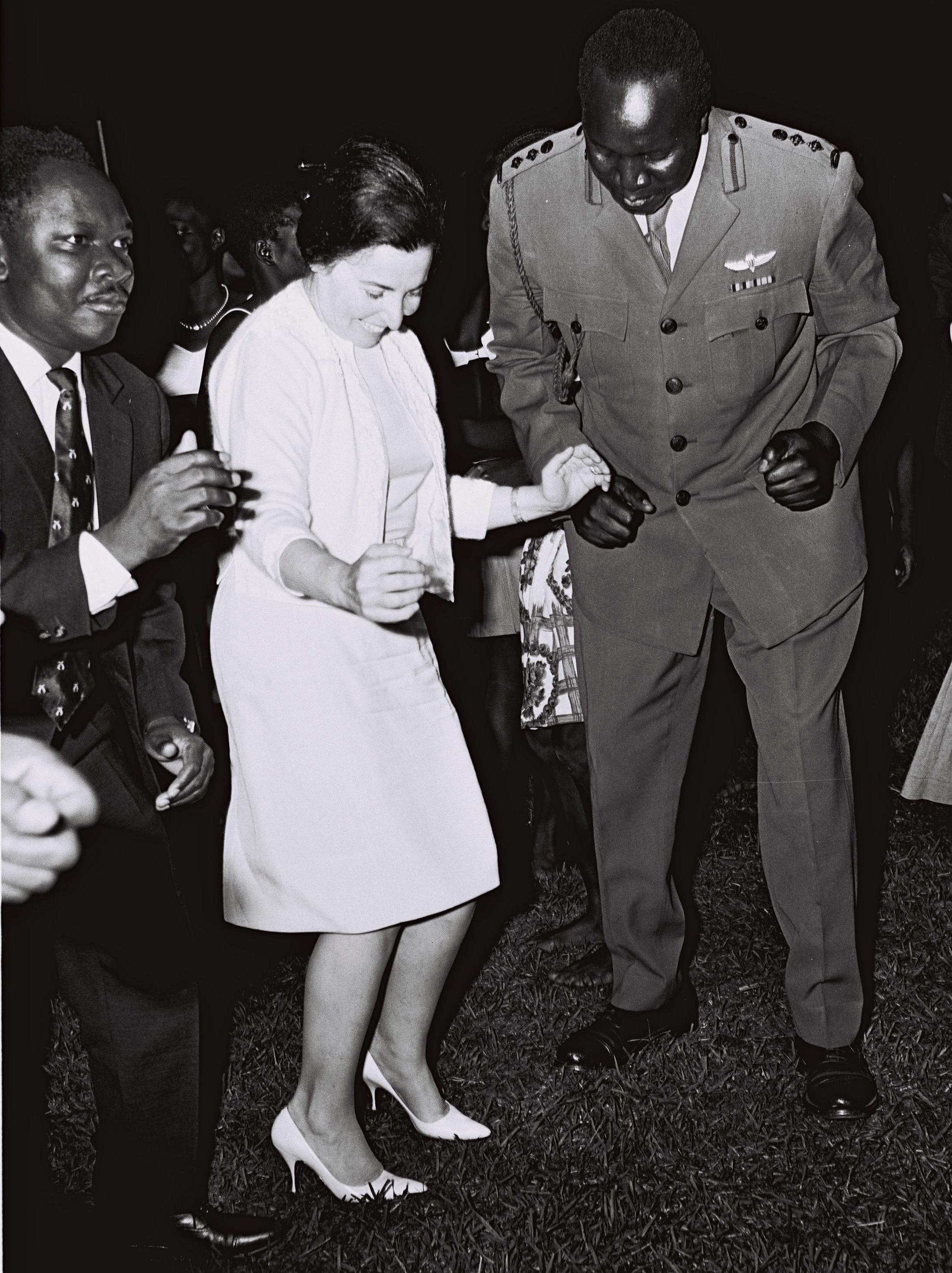
Miriam Eshkol dancing with Idi Amin, 1966

In 1966, Prime Minister Levi Eshkol made a state visit to Uganda.

Ugandan President Yoweri Museveni has visited Israel twice since coming to power in 1986; in 2003, he met with Prime Minister Ariel Sharon and Foreign Minister Benjamin Netanyahu to primarily discuss arms deals between the two countries. In 2011, Museveni again visited Israel. His visit was facilitated by former Pensioner Affairs Minister and head of the Mossad turned international businessman Rafi Eitan, who had several investments in Uganda including a cattle farm. Eitan and Museveni are close friends. In February 2020, Israeli Prime Minister Benjamin Netanyahu visited Uganda. In July 2016, Israeli Prime Minister Benjamin Netanyahu had also visited Uganda.

== Entebbe hijacking ==
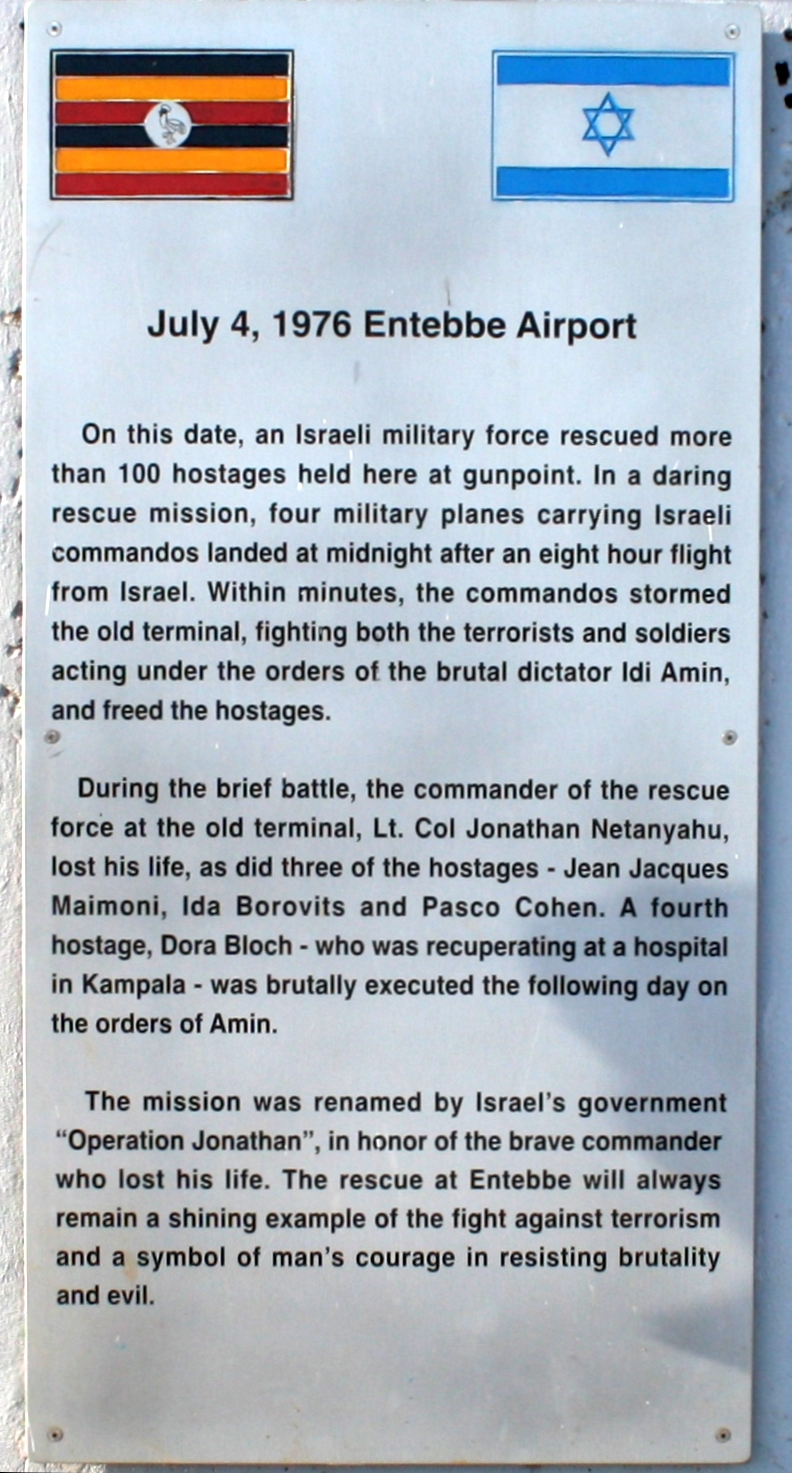
Memorial plaque at Entebbe International Airport

Operation Entebbe was a counter-terrorism hostage-rescue mission carried out by the Israel Defense Forces (IDF) at Entebbe Airport in Uganda on the night of 3 July and early morning of 4 July 1976. In the wake of the hijacking of Air France Flight 139 and the hijackers' threats to kill the hostages if their prisoner release demands were not met, a plan was drawn up to airlift the hostages to safety. These plans took into account the likelihood of armed resistance from Ugandan military troops. Originally codenamed Operation Thunderbolt by the IDF, the operation was retroactively renamed Operation Yonatan in memory of the Sayeret Matkal commander Lieutenant Colonel Yonatan "Yoni" Netanyahu, who was killed by a Ugandan sniper. Three hostages, seven hijackers, and 45 Ugandan soldiers were killed. In addition to the death of Netanyahu, five other Israeli commandos were wounded. A fourth hostage was killed by Ugandan army officers at a nearby hospital.

== Jewish community in Uganda ==
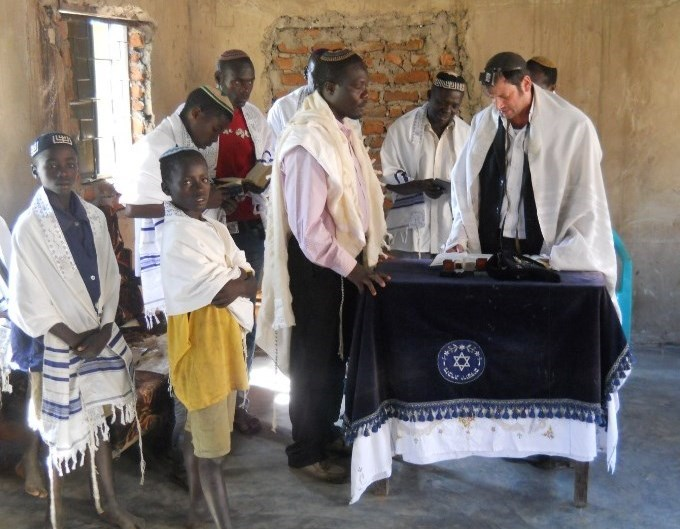
Abayudaya prayer in Putti village

The Abayudaya are a Jewish community of Baganda people in eastern Uganda who live in several villages near the town of Mbale. They are devout in their religious practices, keeping Shabbat and keeping kosher. The community is composed of converts and the descendants of converts. The majority of the Abayudaya are recognized by the Reform and Conservative sects of Judaism. However, the villagers of Putti are seeking an Orthodox conversion and observe Orthodox Judaism. Their population is estimated at approximately 1,100, having once been as large as 3,000 (prior to the persecutions of the Idi Amin regime); like their neighbors, they are subsistence farmers. Most Abayudaya are of Bagwere origin, except for those from Namutumba who are Basoga. They speak Luganda, Lusoga or Lugwere, although some have learned Hebrew as well.

In November 2017 Chabad opened a permanent Jewish center in Uganda, becoming the 100th country to host a Chabad center.

== See also ==
- African Jews
- History of the Jews in Uganda
- International recognition of Israel
