= Bubulo =

Town in Uganda

- Ward
- Location within Uganda
- Coordinates: 0.949684°N 34.274034°E
- Country: Uganda
- District: Manafwa District
- County: Bubulo West
- Town Council: Manafwa
- Elevation: 1,209 m (3,967 ft)
- Area codes: for multiple area codes

Bubulo is a ward in Manafwa District in the east of Uganda.

== Location ==
The Bubulo ward is in Manafwa Town Council, Bubulo West, Manafwa District, Eastern Region, Uganda. The Köppen climate classification is Am: Tropical monsoon climate.

== History ==
At the end of the 19th century the Baganda leader Semei Kakungulu led his army into Bugisu against the Bangokho, then the Bawalasi and Bafumbo further north, and then south to Busoba where he built a fort named Nabumali. From here he raided into the mountains of southern Bugisu. In 1901 he created the county of Bubulo to be ruled by his lieutenants. Bukedi District was divided in 1924 into Budama (HQ Tororo), Bugisu (HQ Bubulo) and Bugwere (HG Mbale).

== Sources ==
- "Bubulo, Manafwa Town Council, Bubulo West, Manafwa District, Eastern Region, Uganda", Mindat
- Heald, Suzette (1989), Controlling Anger: The Sociology of Gisu Violence, Manchester University Press, ISBN 978-0-7190-2566-2}
- Hirst, Michael A. (September 2010), "The Changing Pattern of District Administrative Centres in Uganda since 1900", Geographical Analysis, 3 (1): 90–98, doi:10.1111/j.1538-4632.1971.tb00351.x
