= List of people who made multiple religious conversions =

This is a list of people noted for having converted to two or more religions or religious movements. Their original religion is mentioned first when applicable. In certain cases the individual considered themselves to be of more than one religion at a time.

- Nicolas Antoine – Started in Catholicism; conversions to Protestantism and Judaism (not officially admitted to the last one).
- Augustine of Hippo – Mixed Catholic/Pagan background with Catholic upbringing; conversions to Manichaeism, Neoplatonism, and finally baptized Catholic.
- Nissim Baruch Black – Born to Sunni Muslim parents, later converted to Evangelical Christianity at age 14 after attending an Evangelical summer camp. Then turning to Messianic Judaism while still believing in Jesus. Later renounced his belief in Jesus and Christianity altogether and ending up converting to Orthodox Judaism.
- Eldridge Cleaver – Conversions/Associations to Nation of Islam then Evangelical Christianity then Mormonism.
- Nilla Cram Cook – From Christianity to Hinduism to Islam.
- Terry A. Davis – Raised as Catholic, before becoming an Atheist, and later an Independent Fundamentalist Christian.
- Rod Dreher – Started in Methodism; conversions to Catholicism then Eastern Orthodoxy.
- Daveed Gartenstein-Ross – Jewish parents; conversions to Islam then Christianity.
- Newt Gingrich – Lutheran to Baptist to Catholic.
- Dawn Eden Goldstein – Raised in a Reform Jewish household; experienced being "born-again" to become a Christian, initially as Protestant and, many years later, was eventually received into the Catholic Church.
- Tom Hanks – Raised primarily in Catholicism then Mormonism; conversions to "born again" Christianity and eventually Greek Orthodoxy.
- Martin Harris – Undetermined Protestantism; Conversions to the Quakers, Universalists, Baptists, Presbyterians, and several denominations of Mormonism, also may have been Methodist for a time. Known among Mormons as one of the Three Witnesses.
- Lex Hixon – Not raised religious; conversions to Vedanta, Sufism. Eastern Orthodox Christianity, and possibly Zen.
- Rabiah Hutchinson – "Matriarch" of radical Islam in Australia, born to a Sydney Presbyterian family; she later become a Baptist, then converted to Catholicism and eventually, to Sunni Islam.
- Semei Kakungulu – Originally followed traditional African religion, then converted to Protestantism, Malakite Christianity, and finally Judaism.
- Muhammad Khodabandeh (Oljeitu) – Nestorian Christian upbringing; Buddhism, Sunni Islam, and Shia Islam.
- David Kirk – Originally Baptist; became a deacon in the Melkite Greek Catholic Church and later converted to the Orthodox Church in America.
- Setsuzo Kotsuji – Born Shinto; converted to Presbyterian Christianity and then Judaism.
- Debi Mazar – Originally Catholic; Actress who reportedly converted to Buddhism, Judaism, and briefly the Jehovah's Witnesses.
- Ibrahim Njoya – Bamum people religion; back and forth conversions from Islam to Christianity. Also created his own religion.
- Salman the Persian – Companion of the Prophet Muhammad; Zoroastrian, then converted to Christianity, later converted to Islam.
- Öljaitü - Ilkhanate ruler who was baptized as a Christian, raised Buddhist, and later converted to Sunni Islam before ascending to the throne. He later converted to Shia Islam. According to al-Safadi he reconverted back to Sunnism before his death, while other sources suggest brief flirtations with traditional shamanism.
- Sinéad O'Connor (Shuhada' Davitt) – Irish singer-songwriter; a former excommunicated Roman Catholic before becoming an ordained breakaway Catholic priest for several years and later a [Sunni] Muslim for theological reasons, thus invalidating her priesthood.
- Kirsten Powers – She was brought up an Episcopalian but spent much of her early adult life as an atheist; reverted to Christianity, first as a Presbyterian and then as a Catholic.
- Theophan Prokopovich – Born and raised an Orthodox Christianity, he converted to Eastern Catholicism in order to achieve better educational benefits, but reverted to Orthodox Christianity later in life.
- J. D. Salinger – Started in Judaism; converted or experimented with Zen Buddhism, Advaita Vedanta, Dianetics, and Christian Science.
- Skanderbeg – Albanian monarch and military leader, National Hero of Albania, was born as Serbian Orthodox, converted to Islam in his early years, but reverted to Christianity later in life, dying as a Catholic.
- Muriel Spark – Grew up a Presbyterian in the Church of Scotland, she was converted at first to Anglicanism in the Church of England and finally to Catholicism.
- Ignaz Trebitsch-Lincoln – Born an Orthodox Jew, he converted to Lutheranism to escape Austro-Hungarian authorities, and then converted to both Presbyterianism and Anglicanism and then finally converted to Buddhism towards the end of his life.
- Lauren Winner – A convert to Orthodox Judaism then to Christianity. Later ordained as an Episcopal priest.
