= Semei Kakungulu Museum =

Museum in Mbale, Uganda

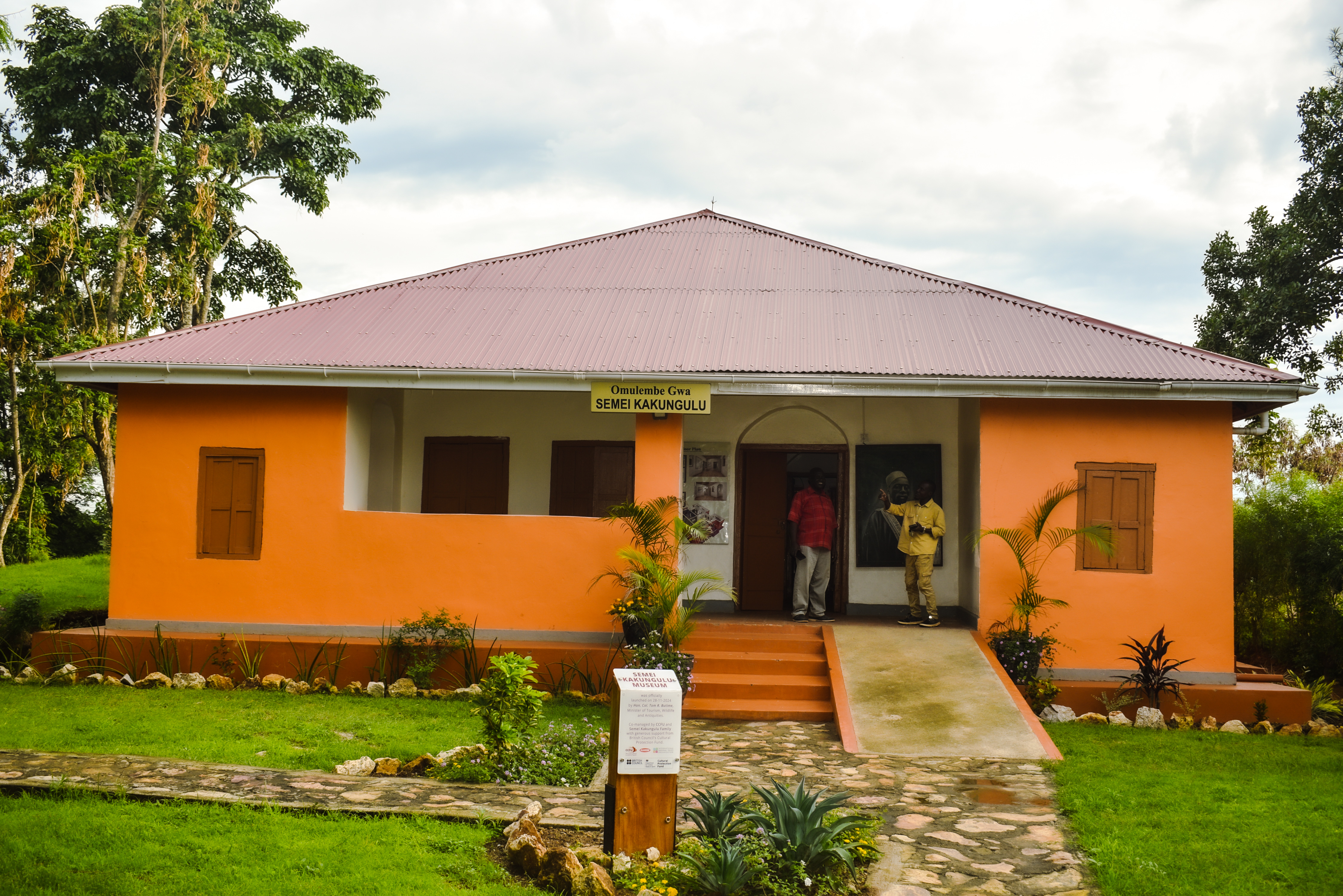
- Museum entrance

- Map of Uganda showing the location of Semei Kakungulu Museum.
- Established: 2024
- Location: Gangama Hill in Mbale City, Eastern Uganda
- Coordinates: 1.097037°N 34.19495°E
- Type: Historical

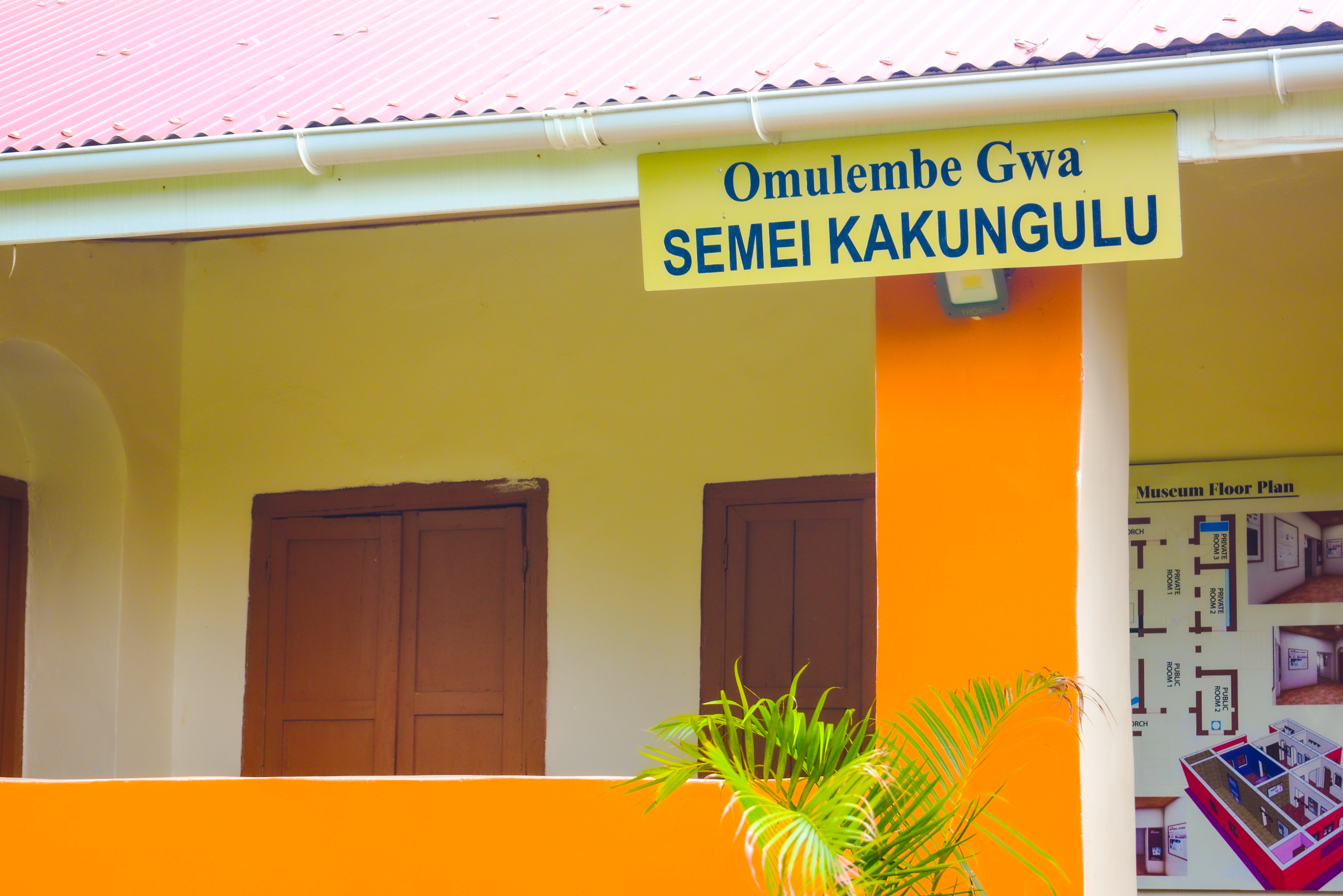
Entrance to Semei Kakungulu museum, Gangama hill - Mbale city

Semei Kakungulu Museum (also known as Omulembe Gwa Kakungulu) is a Ugandan heritage and cultural museum located on Gangama Hill in Mbale City, Eastern Uganda. It commemorates the life and legacy of Semei Kakungulu (1869–1928), a prominent Ugandan leader, environmentalist, and founder of the Abayudaya Jewish community. The museum officially opened in 2024.

== Location ==
The museum is situated on Gangama Hill, in Kasanvu Cell, Mbale City. It covers approximately 3.5 acres and features four heritage zones, including a restored historic house, scenic vantage points, and trails leading to remnants of the first Abayudaya synagogue.

== Historical significance ==
The museum is dedicated to Semei Kakungulu, a military leader who played a central role in expanding British influence in Eastern Uganda in the early 20th century. He is remembered for promoting modern education and medicine, planting mvule trees to encourage environmental conservation, and for founding the Abayudaya Jewish sect in 1917.

== Development ==
The museum was developed through the project "Withstanding Change: Heritage Amongst Climate Uncertainty", funded by the British Council’s Cultural Protection Fund. The project was implemented by the Cross-Cultural Foundation of Uganda (CCFU), in collaboration with the Semei Kakungulu family and the International National Trusts Organisation (INTO).

=== Opening ceremony ===
The museum was inaugurated on 28 November 2024 by Tom Butime, Uganda’s Minister of Tourism, Wildlife and Antiquities. The opening was attended by cultural leaders, government officials, representatives of the Uganda Tourism Board, and members of the international Jewish community.

The museum opened to the public on 29 November 2024, offering free entry for one week before adopting regular operating hours.

== Galleries ==
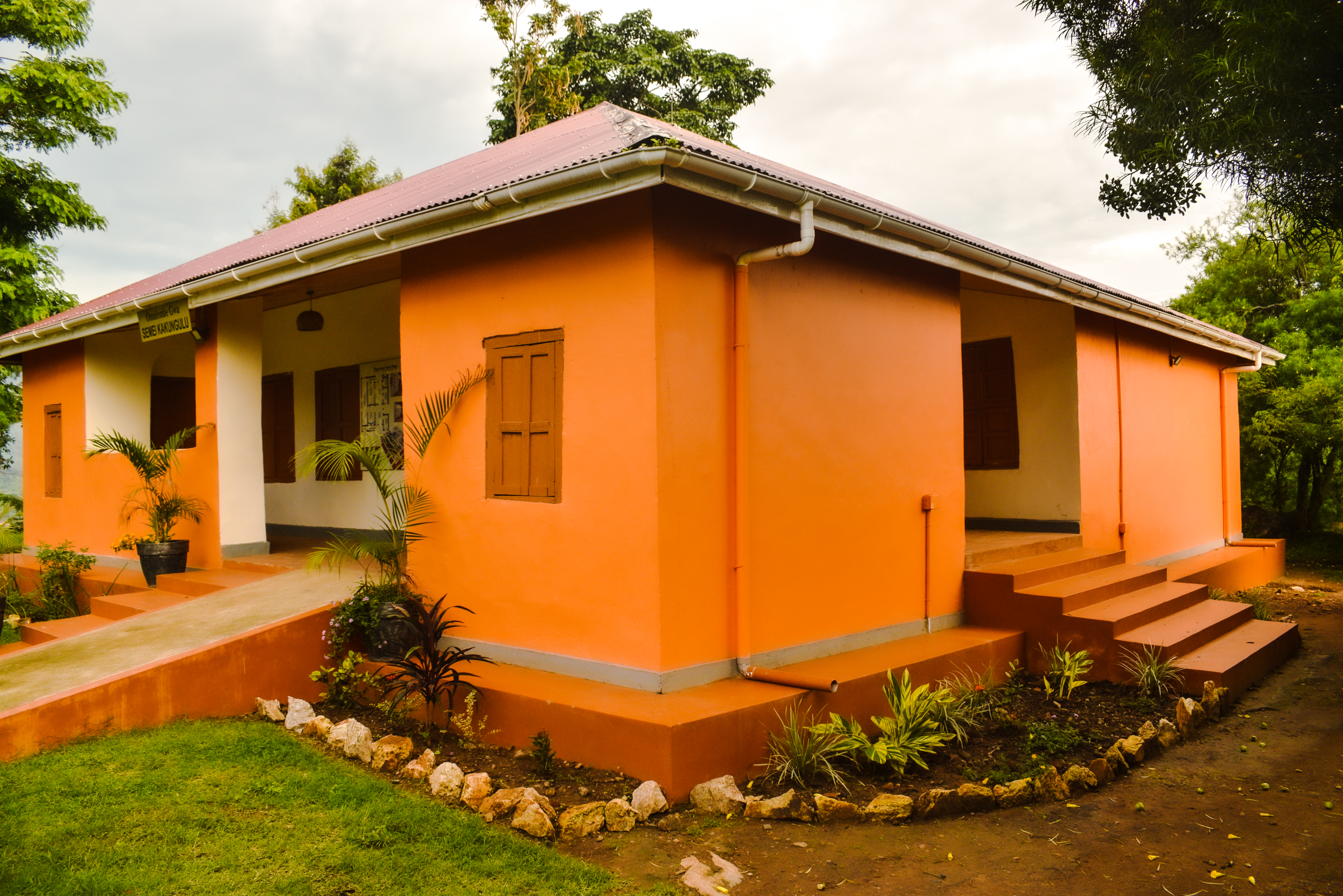

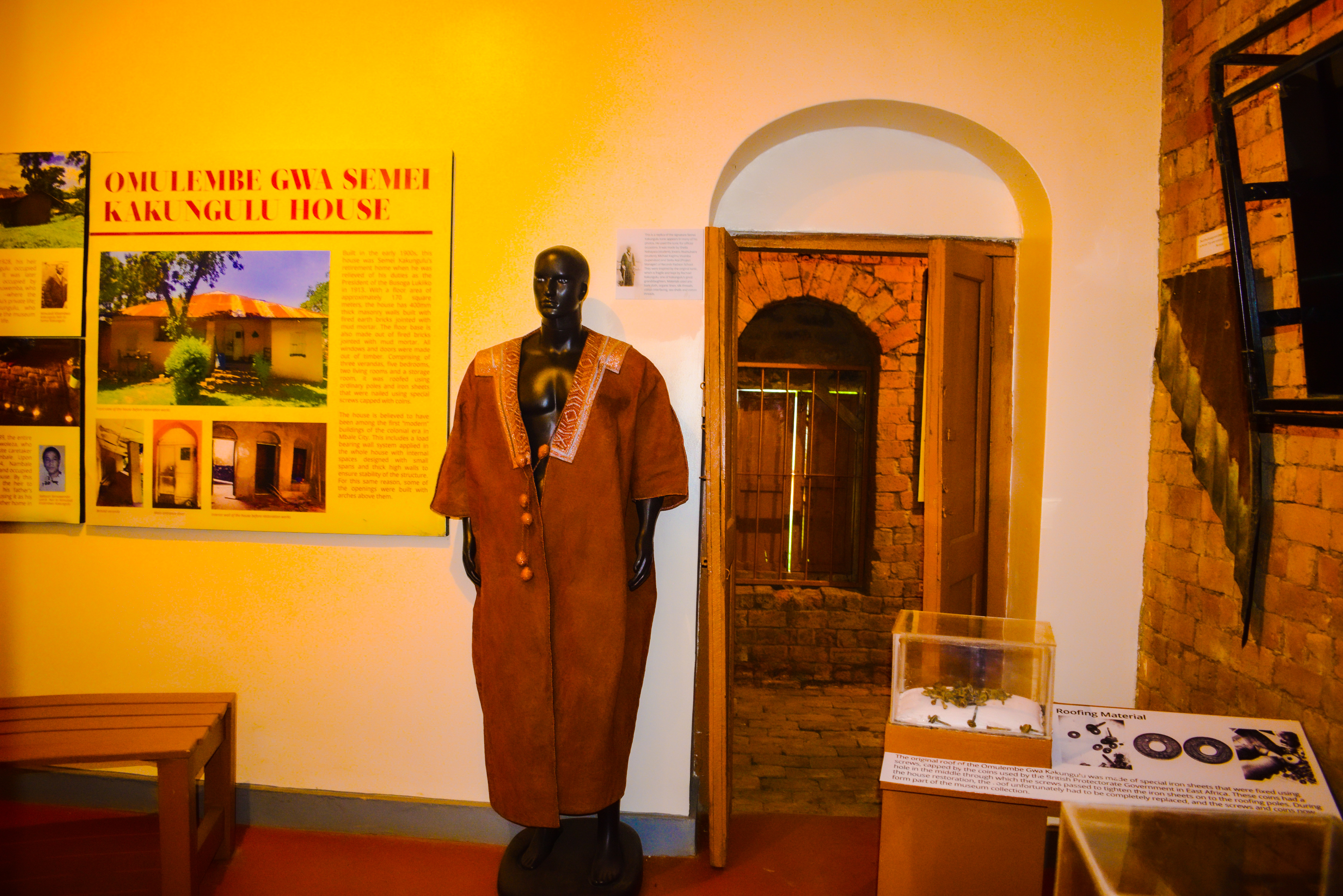

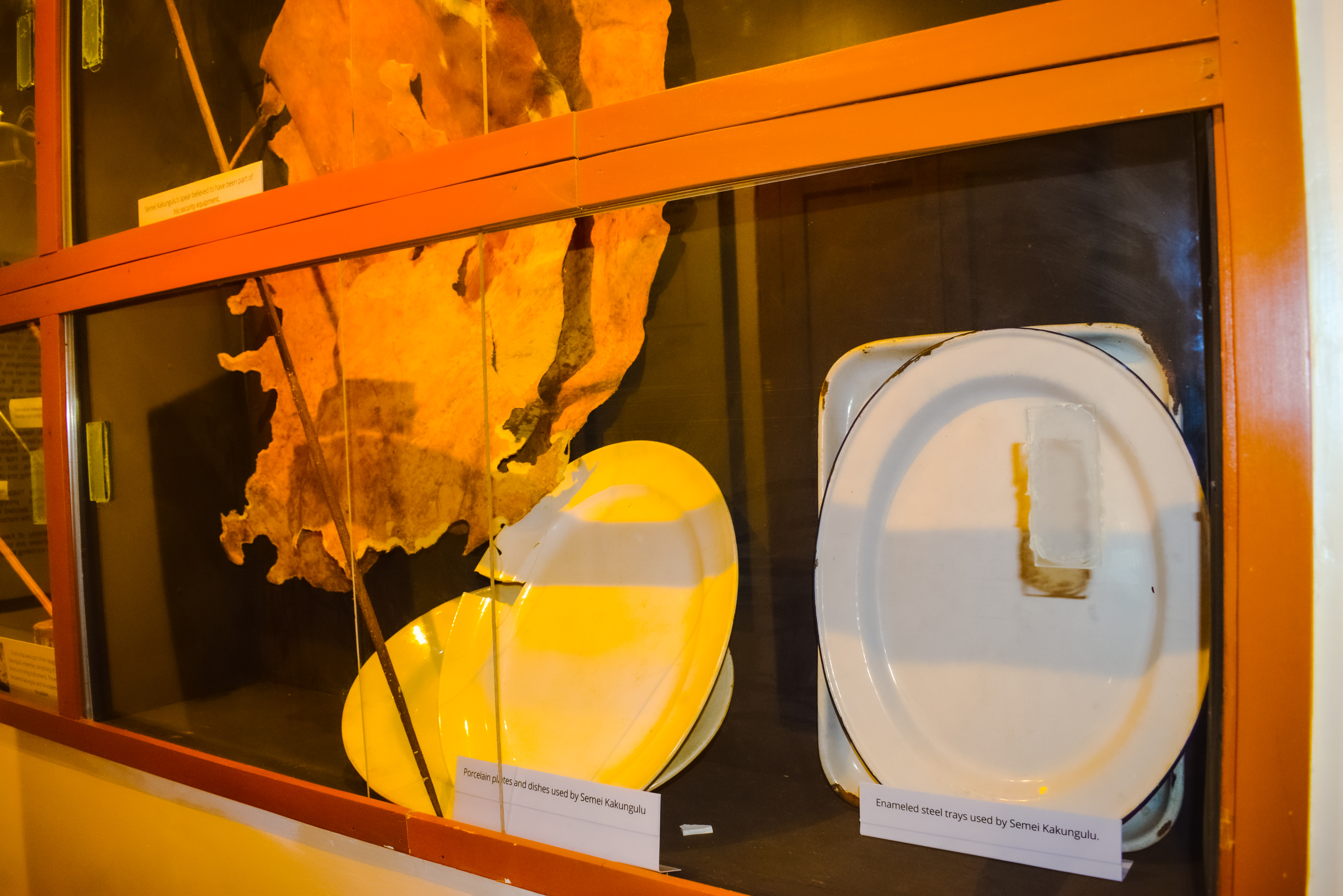

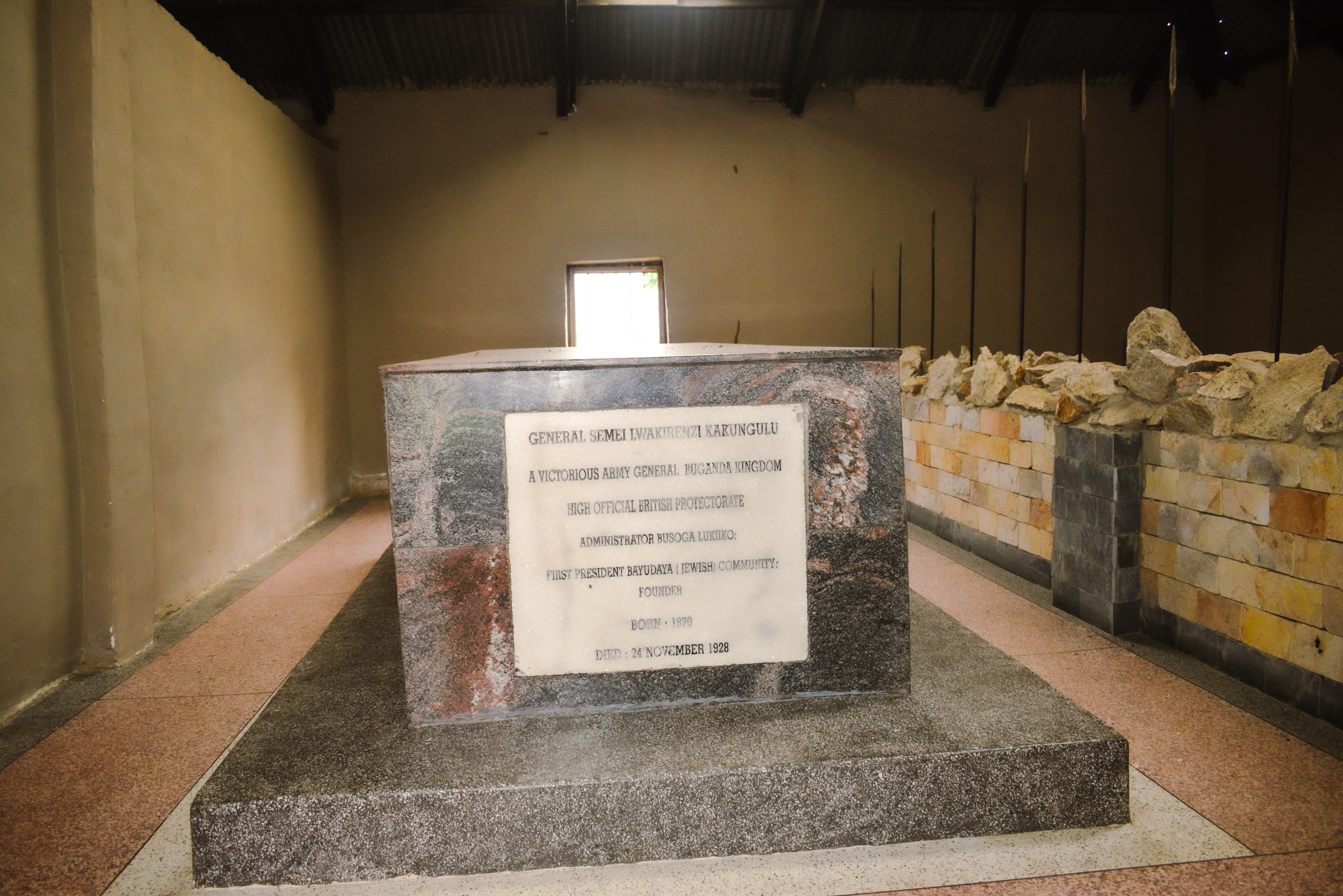

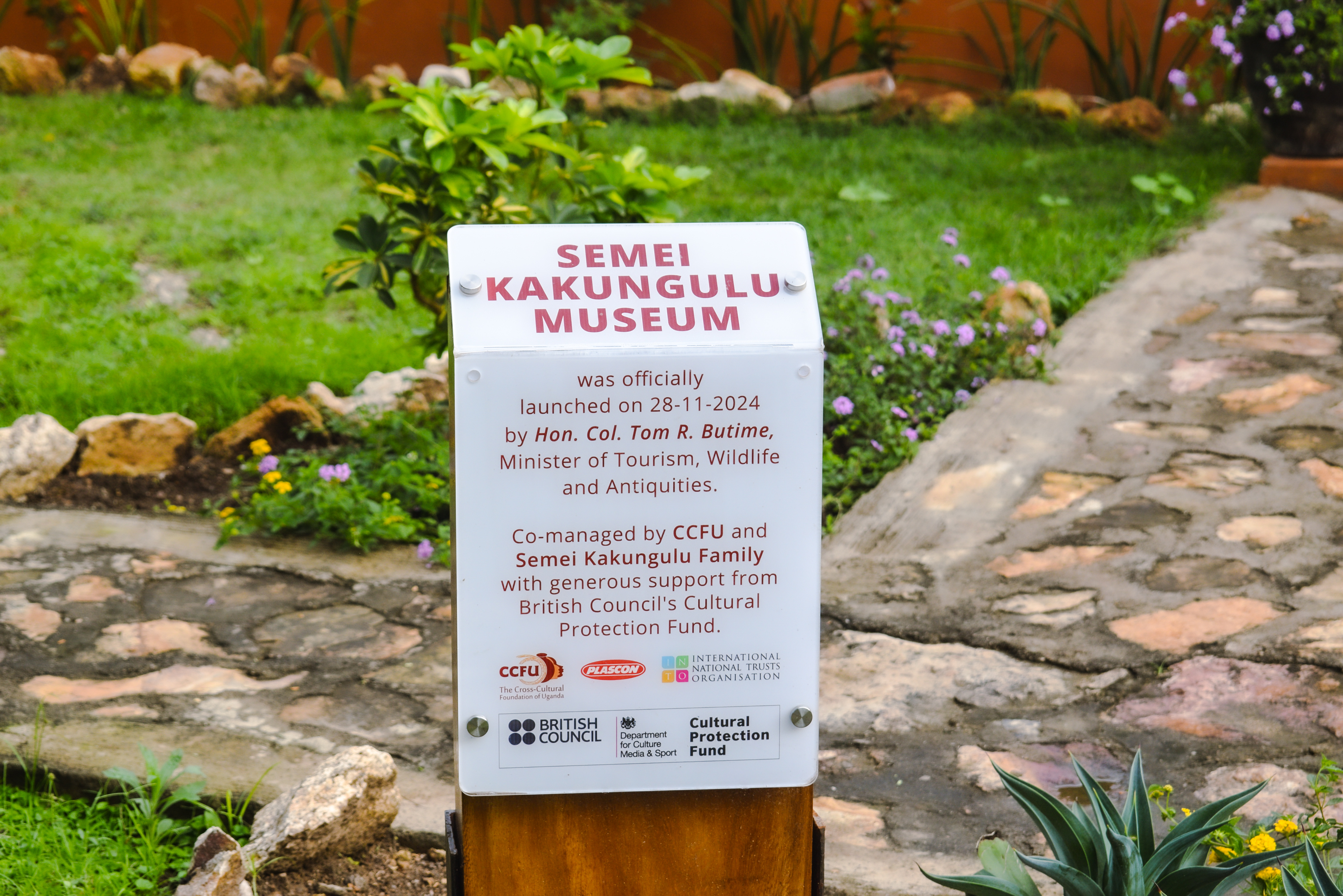

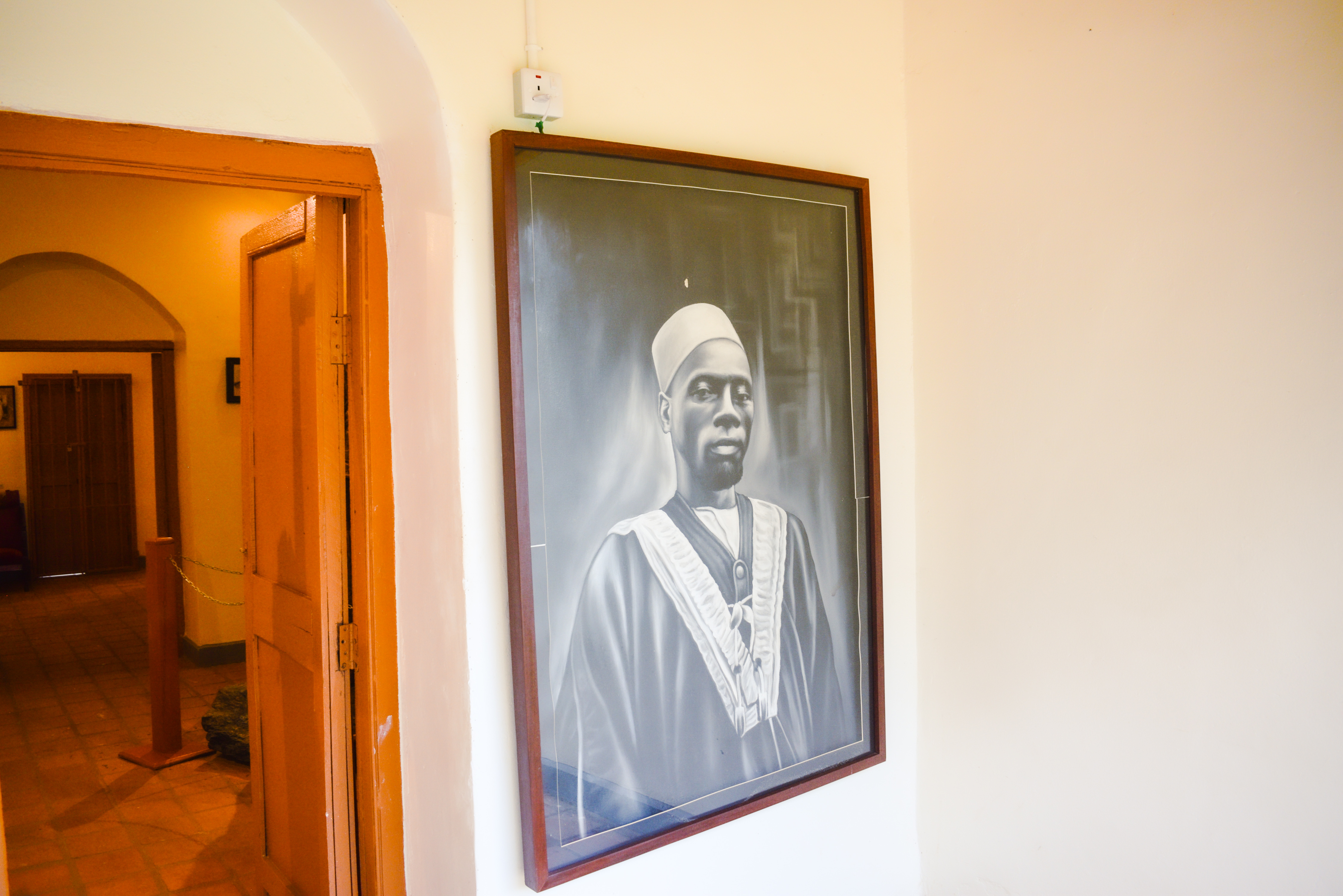

== Collection ==
Semei Kakungulu Museum has a collection of about 1000 items which includes; art gallery section, auditorium, collections management and storage, conservation & restoration.

== Significance ==
The museum aims to:

- Preserve Uganda’s cultural and environmental heritage
- Promote tourism and create employment in Mbale City
- Provide educational resources on Kakungulu’s legacy
- Strengthen local and national identity through heritage conservation

== See also ==
- Semei Kakungulu
- St. Luke Community Museum
- Ham Mukasa Museum
- Abayudaya
- Culture of Uganda
- List of museums in Uganda
