= BRIMS Heritage Resource Centre =

Museum in Kampala, Uganda

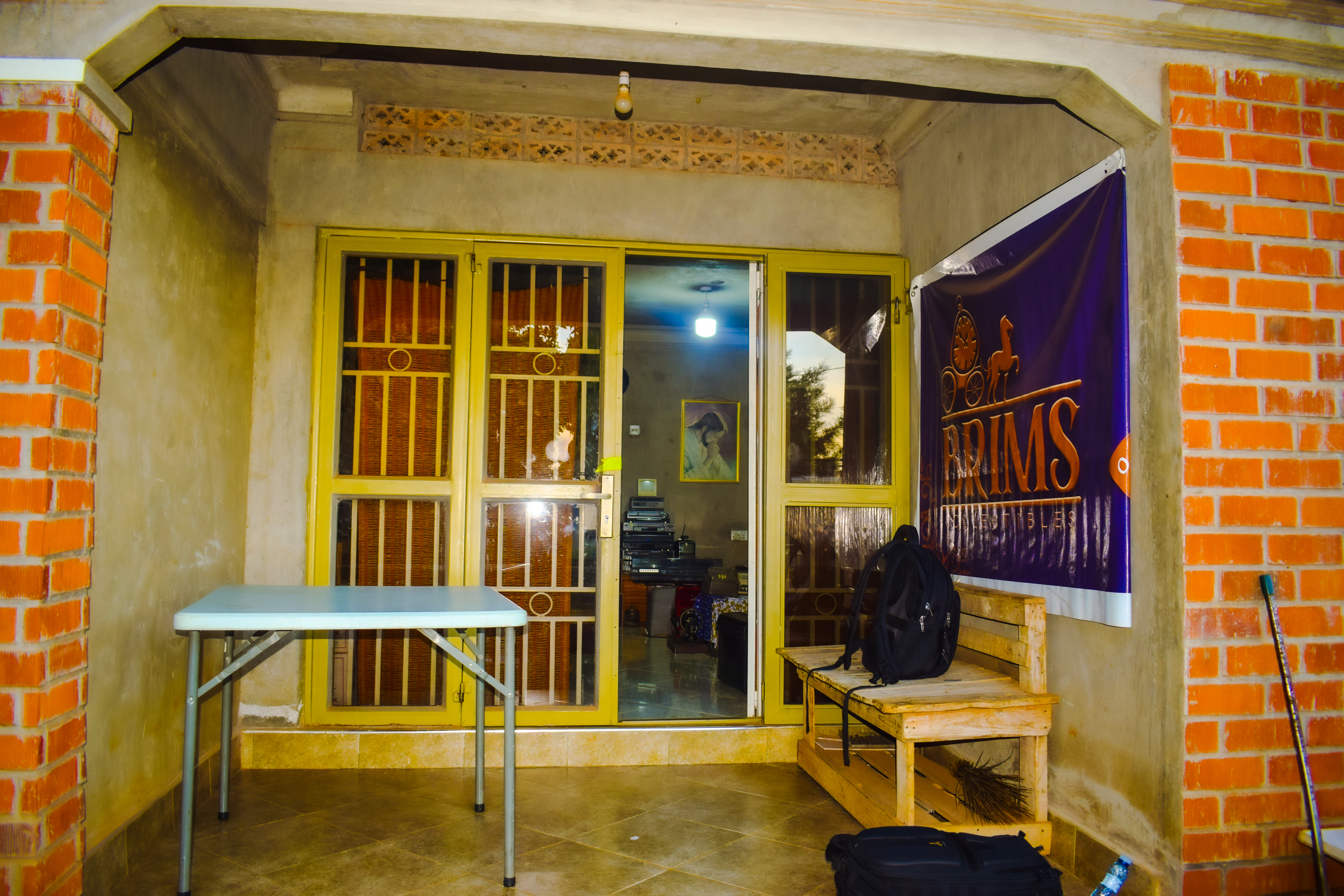
- Exterior of BRIMS Heritage Resource Centre

- Map of Uganda showing the location of BRIMS Heritage Resource Centre.
- Location: Namugongo
- Coordinates: 0.398321°N 32.66532°E
- Type: Community museum and heritage centre
- Directors: Emmanuel Ssemwanga and Aidah Nakitende
- Curator: Aidah Nakitende

BRIMS Heritage Resource Centre (abbreviated as BRIMS) is a community museum and heritage centre located in Namugongo, Uganda. It was founded by Emmanuel Ssemwanga and Aidah Nakitende and is dedicated to preserving, conserving and exhibiting Uganda’s cultural and technological heritage.

== History ==
The museum was established by Ssemwanga and Nakitende, who named it after their children (Benjamin, Racheal, Israel, and Maria). It operates under a board of directors and has been active in Uganda’s heritage preservation networks since its founding.

== Collections ==
BRIMS houses a wide range of artifacts, including:

- Analog audiovisual devices and media
- Traditional tools and instruments
- Vintage household items
- Antique collectibles

The collections aim to showcase the intersection of Uganda’s cultural traditions with technological changes across the decades.

=== Gallery ===
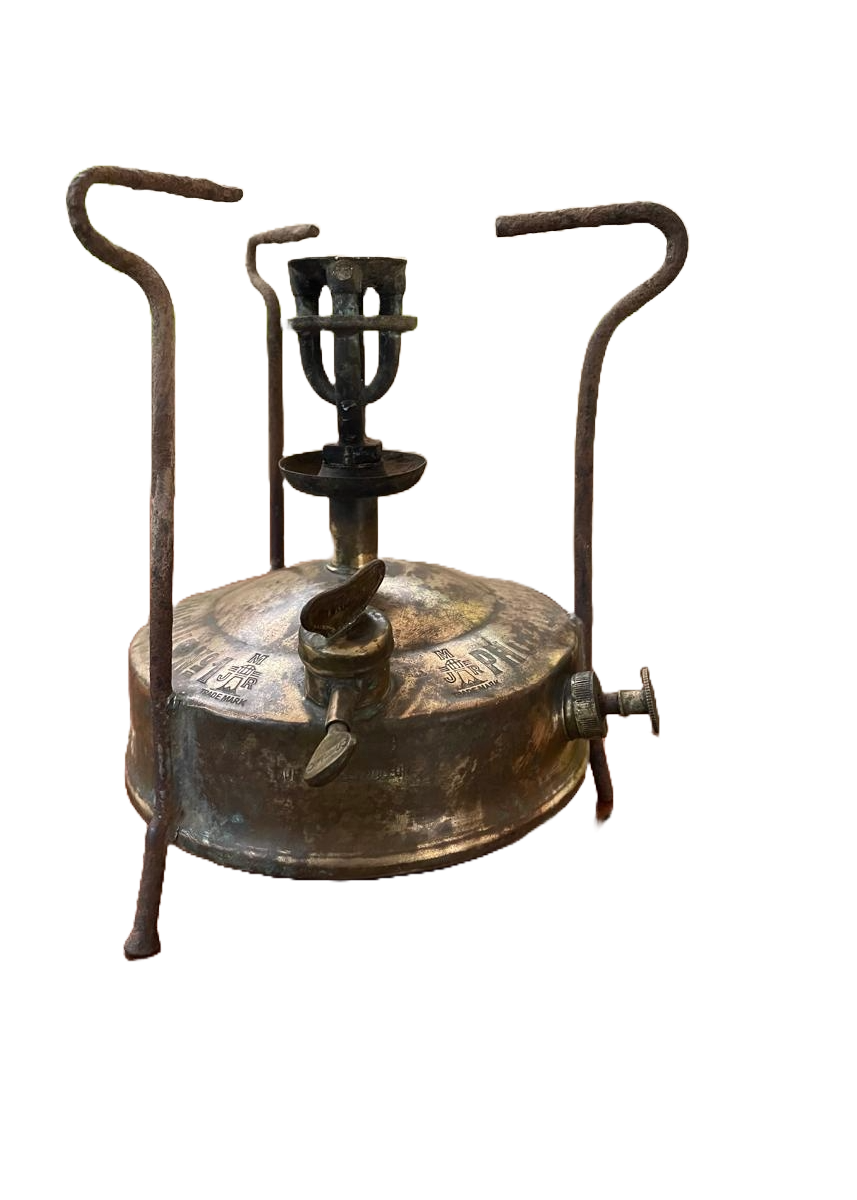

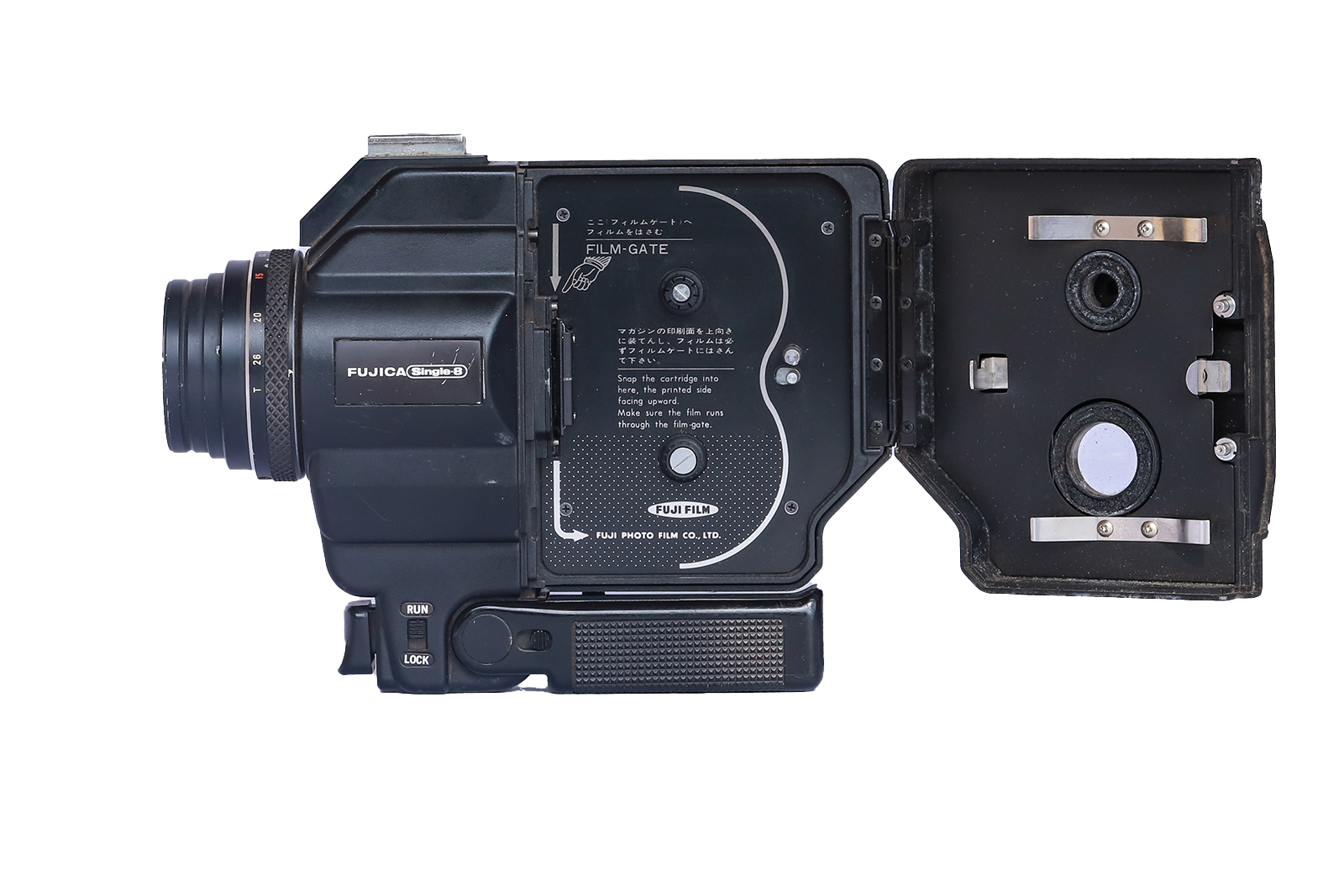

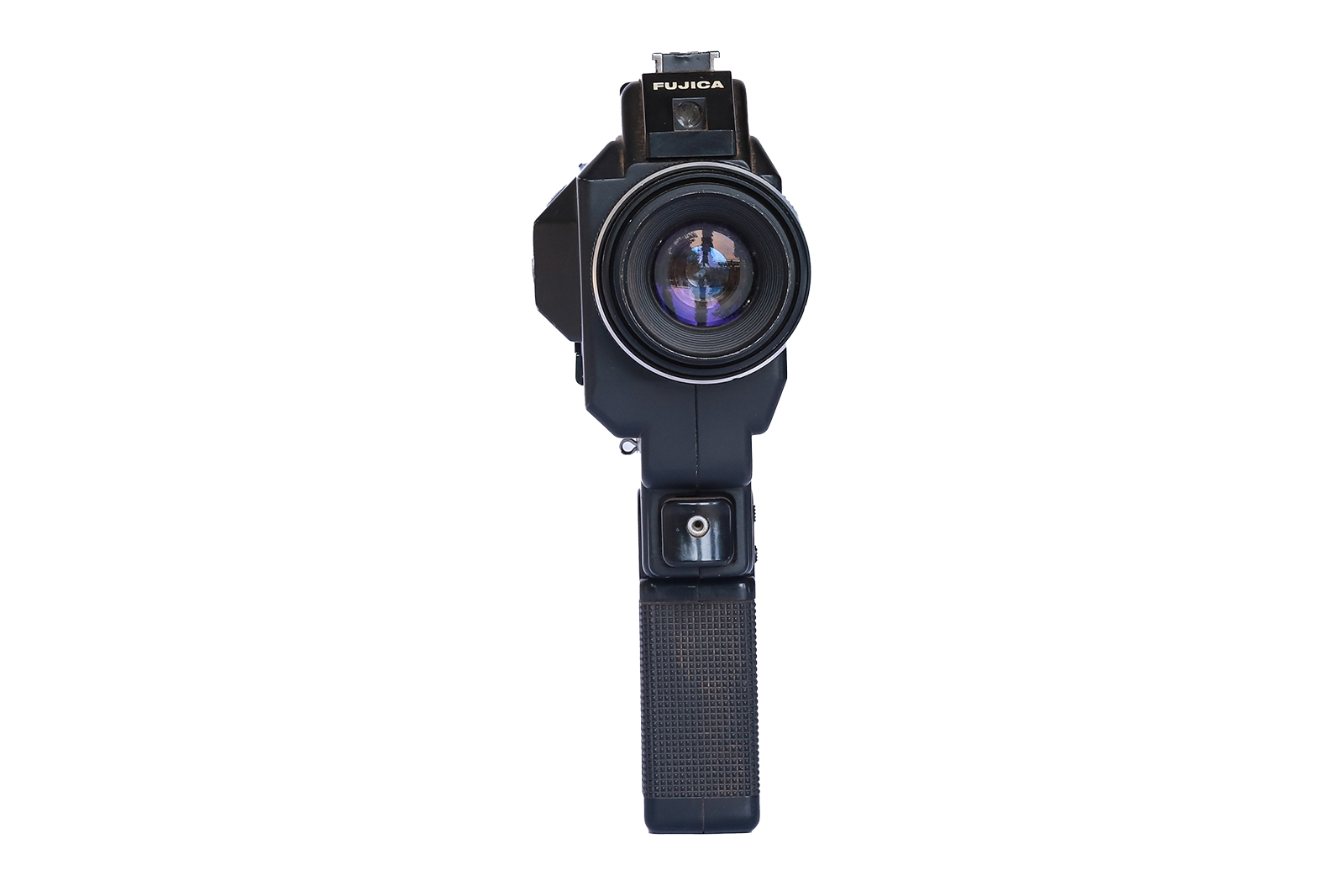

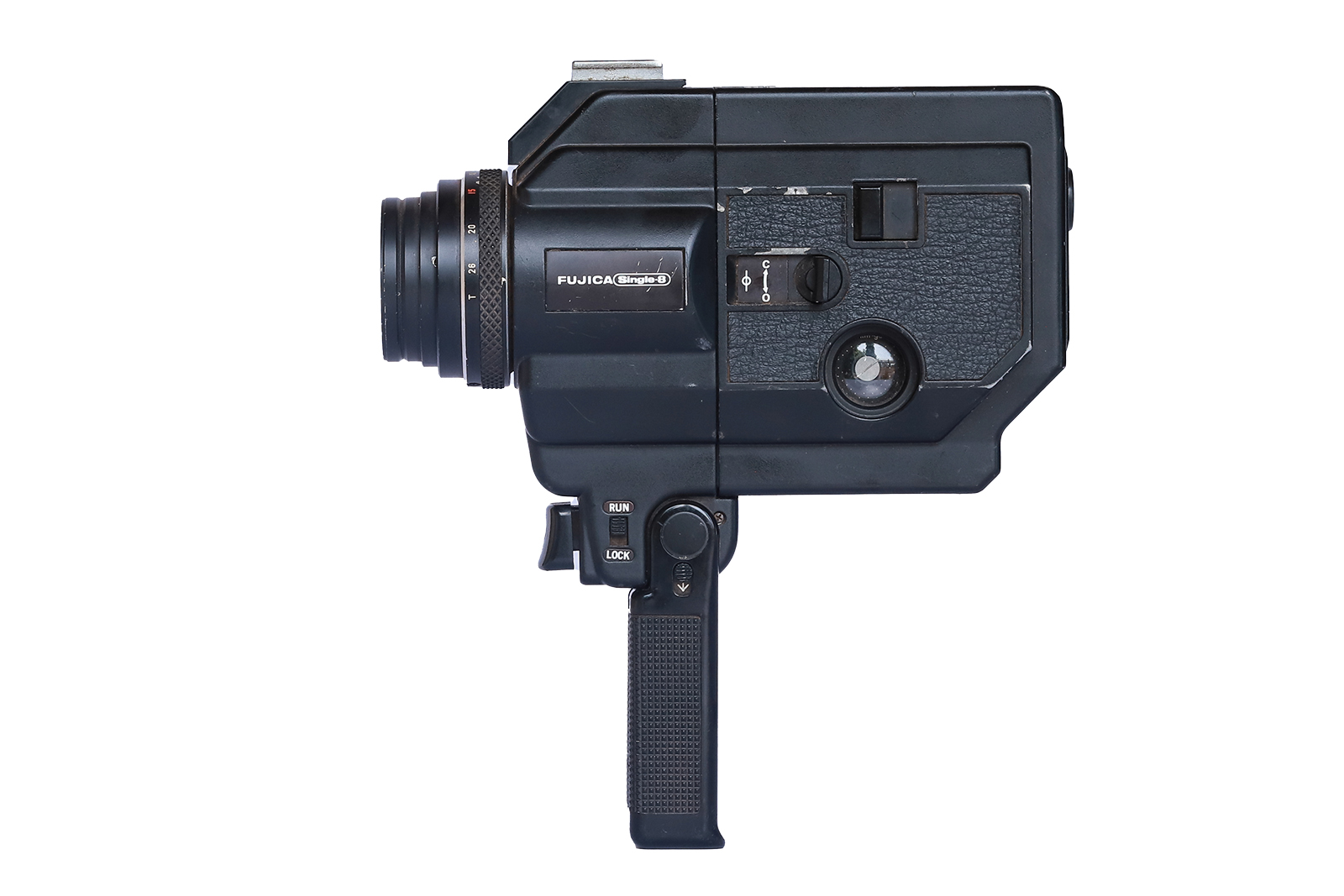

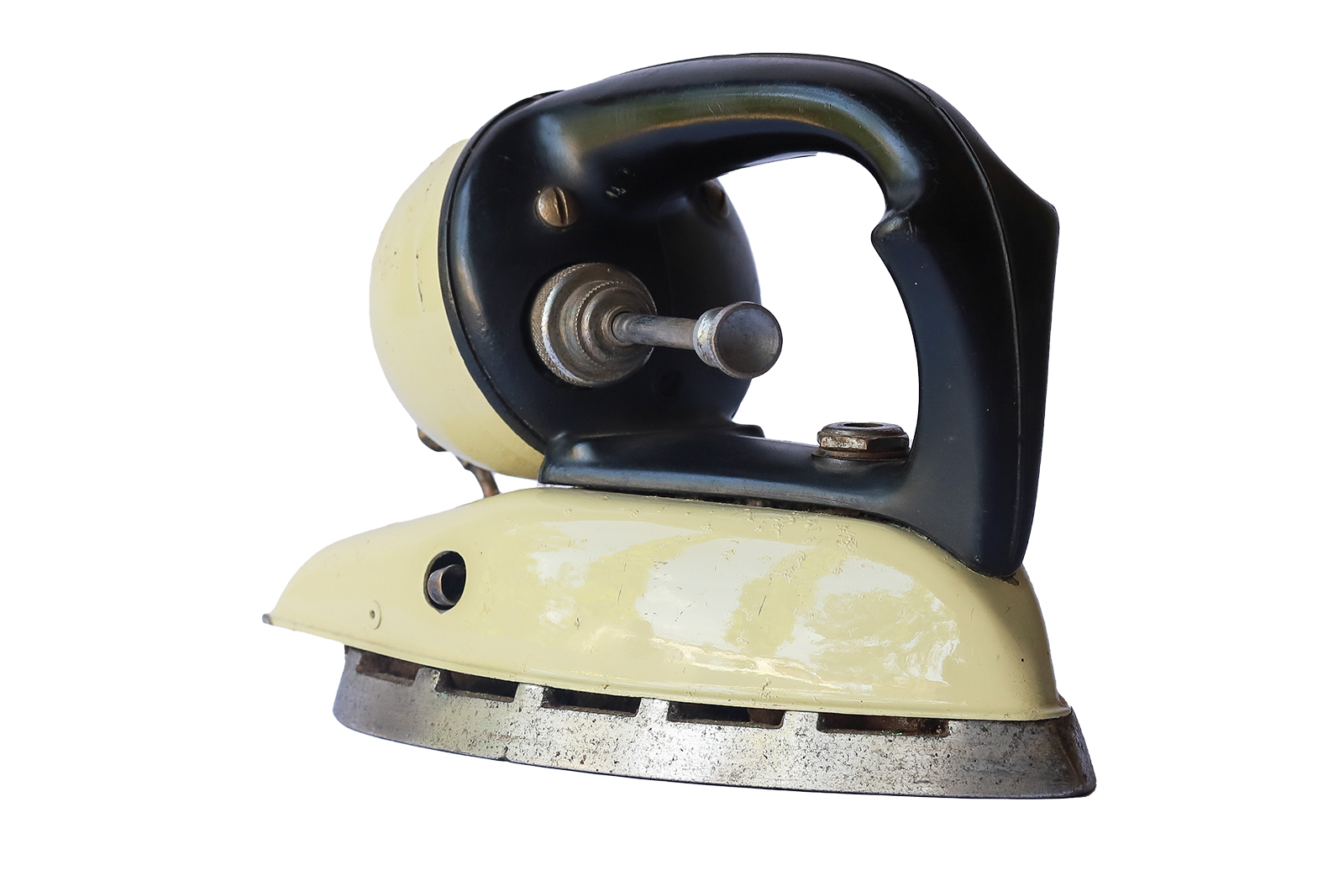

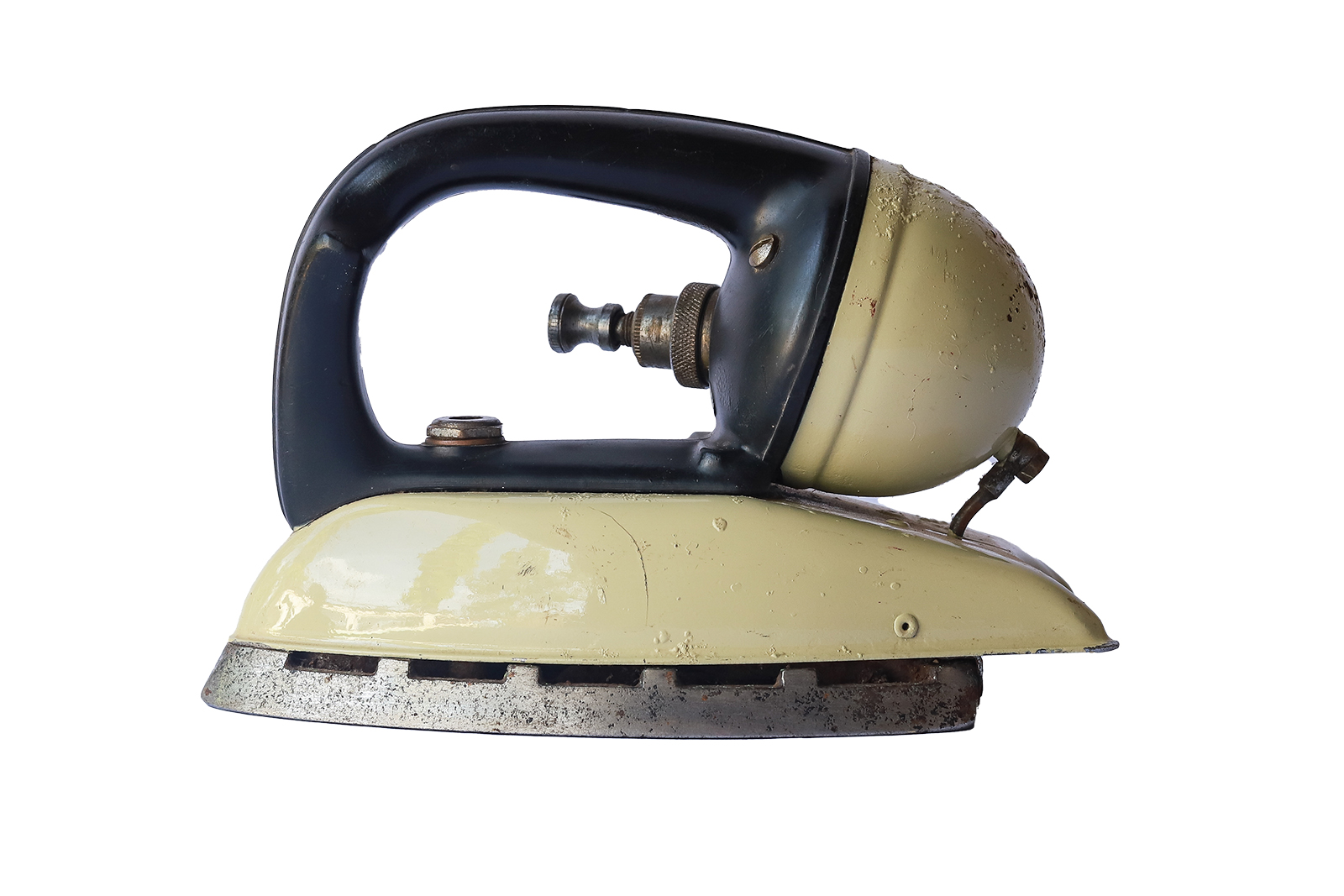

== Mission and activities ==
The museum’s mission is to preserve Uganda’s tangible cultural heritage while engaging the public through exhibitions, tours, and outreach programs. It also runs a mobile museum initiative to reach wider communities.

BRIMS is an active member of the Uganda Community Museums Association (UCOMA) and collaborates with the International Council of Museums (ICOM).

== Location ==
BRIMS is located in Jjanda, Kira Town Council, near Namugongo, a site of religious and cultural significance. Its position makes it accessible to both local and international visitors.

== See also ==
- Semei Kakungulu Museum
- St. Luke Community Museum
- Culture of Uganda
- Uganda National Cultural Centre
