= The Kangai-Kabalega monument =

Monument in Uganda

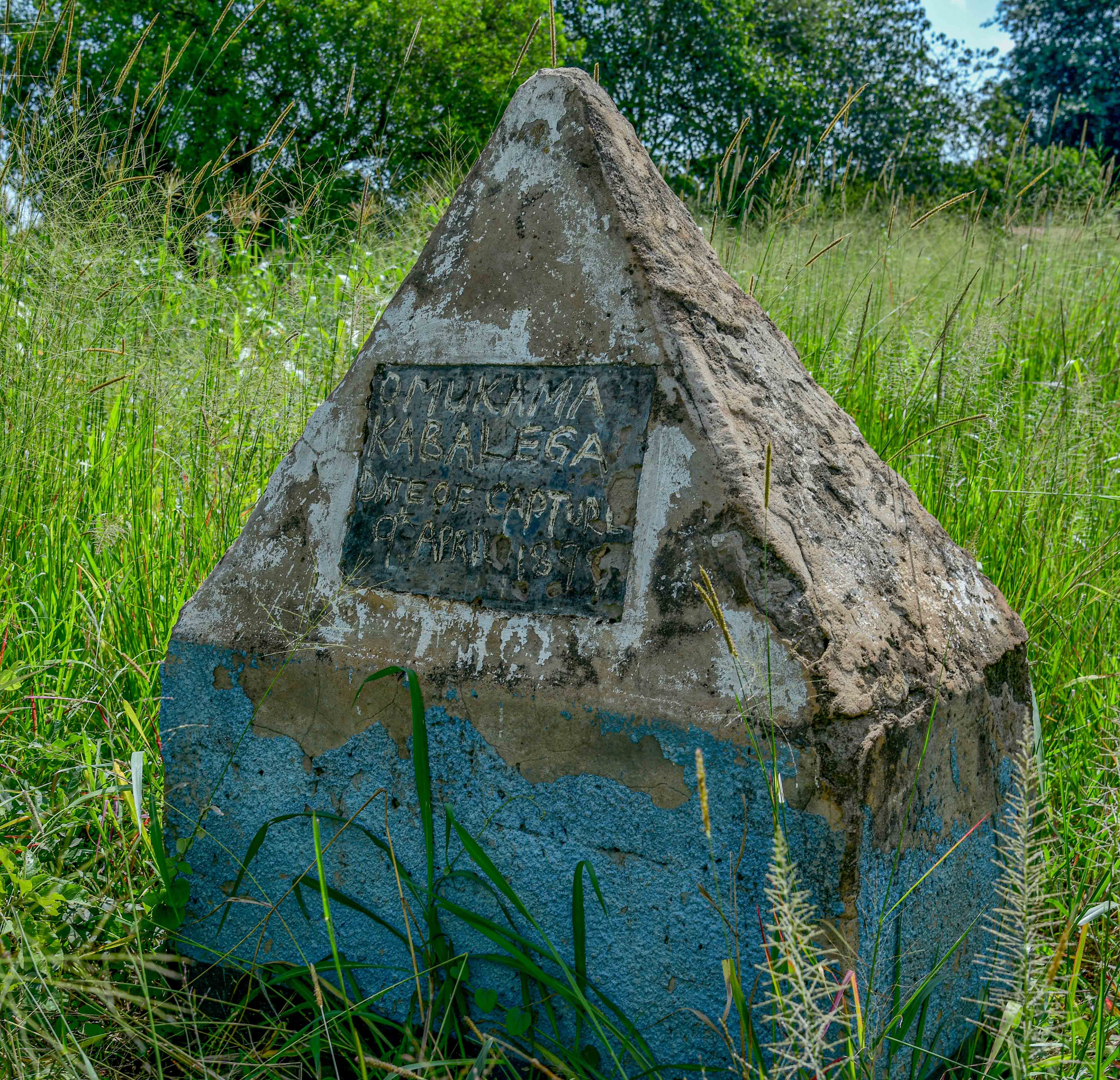
Omukama Kabalega capture site

The Kangai-Kabalega monument is a white and blue painted landmark which marks the spot where Kabaka Mwanga and Omukama Kabalega were captured by the British colonialists in 1899. In Particular, there are two sites (Monuments) approximately 200 meters from each other which show where the great Kings were individually captured (Kabalega on the right and Mwanga on the left of the current road going from Kaberamaido to kangai). According to site curator, David Oketcha, the Kings were flanked/ surrounded by the British forces who included Semei Kakungulu and trapped by the river to the south which they could not cross.

== Location ==
The Kangai-Kabalega monument is located in Kangai subcounty in Dokolo district in Northern Uganda. The nearest major town to the monument is Kaberamaido town (8 km away). There is ongoing work by the MINISTRY OF TOURISM, WILDLIFE & ANTIQUITIES to build a cultural Heritage Center to showcase this remarkable monument

== History ==
During Kabalega's reign, the British made many attempts to capture him because of his resistance to colonial rules.

In 1872, Samuel Baker made Bunyoro an annex of the British protectorate which led to the fight between Kabalega and the whites.

On 9 April 1899, Kabalega was captured at Kangai in an ambush that was led by Semei Kakungulu. He was shot in the leg and arm. Kabalega was later exiled initially to Kenya, then to Kismayo in Somalia and lastly to Seychelles island where he died from in 1923.

Kabaka Mwanga was also captured on 9 April 1899 by Andereya Luwandaga in the same area with omukama Kabalega.

After the capture of Mwanga and Kabalega, they were transferred to Kampala prior sending them to exiles.

== See also ==
- Omukama Kabalega
- Kabaka Mwanga
