= Abayudaya =

Community in eastern Uganda that practices Judaism

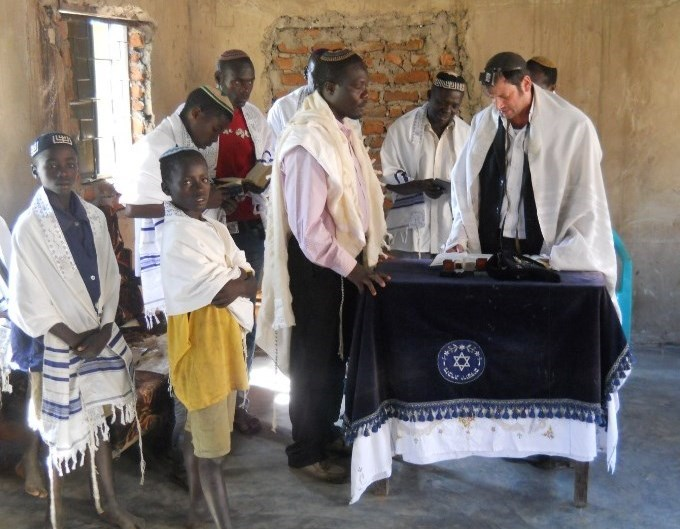
- ِLocal and foreign Rabbis pray in the synagogue of Puti next to Mbale

Total population
- 2,500

Regions with significant populations
- Uganda

Languages
- Luganda, Lusoga, Lugwere, Hebrew

Religion
- Judaism

Related ethnic groups
- Baganda, Bagwere, Basoga

The Abayudaya (Luganda for "People of Judah") are a Jewish community in eastern Uganda, near the town of Mbale. They are devout in their practice, keeping kashrut and observing Shabbat. There are several different villages where the Abayudaya live. A community that converted to Judaism in the 20th century, most community members are affiliated with the Reform and Conservative movements of Judaism. In June 2016, Rabbi Shlomo Riskin led a Beit Din that performed an Orthodox conversion for the Putti community of Abayudaya.

The Abayudaya's population is estimated to number between 2,000 and 3,000; like their neighbors, they are subsistence farmers. Most Abayudaya are of Bagwere origin. Some, from Namutumba, are Basoga. They speak Luganda, Soga, or Gwere, and some have learned Hebrew as well.

== History ==
=== 19th century ===
The group owes its origin to Muganda military leader Semei Kakungulu. Originally, Kakungulu was converted to Christianity by British missionaries around 1880. He believed that the British would allow him to be king of the territories Bukedi and Bugisu, which he had conquered in a battle for them. However, when the British limited his territory to a significantly smaller size and refused to recognize him as king as they had promised, Kakungulu began to distance himself from them.

=== 20th century ===
In 1913, Semei Kakungulu became a member of the Bamalaki sect, which followed a belief system that combined elements of Judaism, Christianity, and Christian Science, most notably, a refusal to use western medicine (based on a few sentences taken from the Old Testament). This led to conflict with the British when the Bamalaki refused to vaccinate their cattle. However, upon further study of the Bible, Kakungulu came to believe that the customs and laws described in the Five Books of Moses (the Torah) were really true. When, in 1919, Kakungulu insisted on circumcision as prescribed in the Hebrew Bible, the Bamalaki refused and told him that if he practiced circumcision he would be like the Jews. Kakungulu responded, "Then, I am a Jew!" He circumcised his sons and himself and declared that his community was Jewish. According to Henry Lubega, kakungulu fled to the foot of Mt. Elgon and settled in a place called Gangama where he started a separatist sect known as "Kibina Kya Bayudaya Abesiga Katonda" meaning, "the Community of Jews who trust in the Lord". The British were infuriated by this action and they effectively severed all ties with him and his followers.

The arrival of a foreign Jew known as "Yosef", presumably of Ashkenazi background, in 1920 contributed much towards the community's acquisition of knowledge about the seasons in which Jewish holidays, such as Pesach, Shavuot, Rosh Hashanah, Yom Kippur, and Sukkot, take place. A source in the Abayudaya community confirms that the first Jew to visit the community was Yosef, who stayed with and taught the community for about six months, and would appear to have first brought the Jewish calendar to the Abayudaya community.

Furthermore, the laws concerning kashrut were first introduced to the community by Yosef. The community continues to practice kashrut today. Yosef's teachings influenced Semei Kakungulu to establish a school that acted as a type of Yeshiva, with the purpose of passing on and teaching the skills and knowledge first obtained from Yosef.

After Kakungulu's death from tetanus in 1928, Samson Mugombe Israeli, one of his disciples, became the spiritual leader of the community, which isolated itself for self-protection.

In 1962, Arye Oded, an Israeli studying at Makerere University, visited the Abayudaya and met Samson Mugombe. This was the first time the Abayudaya had ever met an Israeli, and the first time the community was meeting a foreign Jew since Yosef. Oded had many long interviews with Mugombe and other leaders and explained to them how Jews in Israel practised Judaism. Oded then wrote a book known as "Religion and Politics in Uganda" and numerous articles on the community and their customs which introduced them to world Jewry.

However, in the 1970s they were persecuted by Idi Amin, who outlawed Jewish rituals and destroyed synagogues. Some of the Abayudaya community converted to either Christianity or Islam in the face of religious persecution. A core group of roughly 300 members remained, however, committed to Judaism, worshipping secretly and fearful that they would be discovered by their neighbors and reported to the authorities. This group later named itself "She'erit Yisrael" — the Remnant of Israel — meaning the surviving (Ugandan) Jews.

The community underwent a revival in the 1980s.

=== 21st century ===
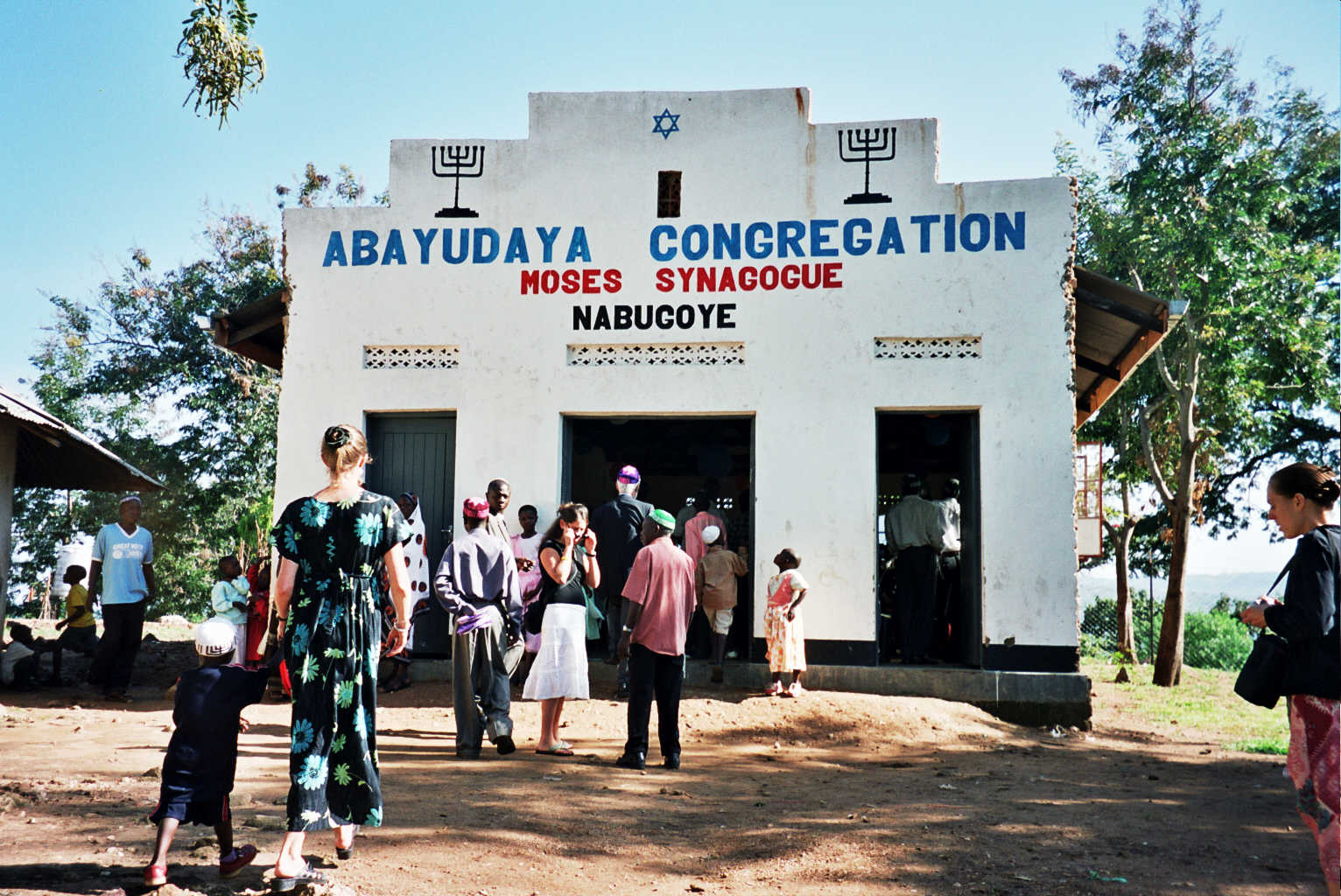
Synagogue of the Abayudaya community in Nabugoye, Mbale, Uganda

Approximately 400 Abayudaya community members were formally converted by five rabbis of the Conservative branch of Judaism in February 2002, and conversions by Conservative rabbis continued during the following years. During the 1990s they were related to a Messianic Jewish congregation led by David Finkelstein.

In 2017, the community lives near the newly built Stern Synagogue on Nabugoye Hill outside Mbale and the nearby synagogue in the village of Namanyonyi; other community members live in Nasenyi, Nalubembe, Buseta, Nangolo and the sole Orthodox community, Putti, all in Pallisa District. An eighth village, Namutumba, with a synagogue, is in Magada Village, approximately 70 km south. Finally, a ninth village, Apac, is north of Mbale. A census was conducted in 2015 by village members, which showed the total population as 1067.

Namutumba, the largest village, is a Jewish community with about 244 members and an active synagogue as well as an interfaith primary school - Tikkun Olam Primary School (TOPS), which is completely solar powered. the Director of TOPS is Yoash Mayende. Rabbi Levi Shadrach Mugoya is the villages current spiritual leader. The elder Rabbi Eri appointed Shadrach to be his successor, who called it “a great honor and a great responsibility.” Shadrach attended Uganda Christian University and graduated with a degree in Project Planning and Entrepreneurship in 2013. He studied in the yeshiva of the chief Abayudaya Rabbi, Gershom Sizomu. Shadrach is currently pursuing his studies with ALEPH (Alliance for Jewish Renewal). The Conservative Yeshivah in Israel has accepted him to study for 2017–2018.

Gershom Sizomu, the spiritual leader of the Abayudaya and the Rosh Yeshiva, was enrolled in the Ziegler School of Rabbinic Studies five-year graduate program at the American Jewish University in Los Angeles, California where he studied Hebrew, rabbinic literature, the Bible, Jewish philosophy, and other subjects. Upon completion of this program, Sizomu received his ordination as a rabbi under the auspices of the Conservative movement on May 19, 2008, and returned to Uganda to lead its Jewish community. He is the first native-born black rabbi in sub-Saharan Africa. He is also the first chief rabbi of Uganda, and the first member of the Abayudaya to be ordained as a rabbi in the United States. In February 2016 he was elected as a Member of Parliament in Uganda representing Bungokho North outside of Mbale.

A new synagogue, Stern Synagogue, named after Ralph and Sue Stern, Jewish Americans who contributed $100,000, now has replaced the small Moses Synagogue on Nabugoye Hill as of 2017. Other key donors are Eyal, Yael, Leya and Aely Aronoff. Julius and Ray Charlstein Foundation. Naty and Debbie Saidoff. The synagogue is, according to Rabbi Sizomu, the biggest in sub-Saharan Africa.

In 2024 Shoshana Nambi became the second member and first female member of the Abayudaya to be ordained as a rabbi in the United States, with the first being Sizomu.

Another development is the possible recognition of the Putti Abayudaya by Israel and the Orthodox Jewish world, thanks to the efforts of Rabbi Shlomo Riskin, founding Chief Rabbi of Efrat and Chancellor of the Ohr Torah Stone institute, in coordination with Putti Village Assistance Organization (PVAO). This plan received a setback in 2018 when the Israel Ministry of the Interior ruled that the Putti Abayudaya were not a recognised Jewish community and so their conversion is "not recognized for the purpose of receiving status in Israel". The community is governed by an elected board, currently chaired by Tarphon Kamya. Putti village receives outside support from PVAO.

== Institutions ==
Besides the five synagogues, Jewish schools have been established with outside help from individuals and organizations where secular and Jewish subjects are taught. Unlike many Christian-run schools, learning Hebrew and Judaism is merely optional for non-Jewish students. Christian, Muslim, and Jewish students attend these schools. Scholarships given by outside sources have enabled some students to attend Universities as well. The following are the currently existing community institutions:

- The Hadassah Primary School located between Nabugoye and Namanyonyi
- The Semei Kakungulu High School (Nabugoye Hill)
- Tikkun Olam Primary School (Namutumba)
- A Yeshiva (Nabugoye Hill) The building of the Yeshiva is being funded by a grant from the United Synagogue Youth Tikun Olam program
- A new Jewish Hospital (Kampala) Galilee Community General Hospital
- A new Jewish Orthodox synagogue Located right in the center of Kampala
- The Tobin Medical Centre located in Mbale funded by Be'chol Lashon

== Community relations ==
The Christian and Muslim neighbors once looked upon the Abayudaya with disdain and hatred, but relations have improved significantly and some view members of the Abayudaya with respect and admiration. It should also be noted that the community has been growing at a steady rate. Numbering only 300 individuals at the time of the fall of Idi Amin, the Abayudaya have grown to as many as 2,000 individuals since that time.

In 2002 the story of the Abayudaya was told in the book Abayudaya: The Jews of Uganda, with photographs and text by photojournalist Richard Sobol and musical recordings produced by Jeffrey Summit and published by Abbeville Press. Sobol has continued to travel and lecture with a multi media slide presentation to help bring the Ugandan Jews out of isolation.

In 2007 an independent production team, Marion Segal Productions, made a documentary film on the Abayudaya on behalf of the South African Broadcasting Corporation (SABC-TV). Its title, "Pearls of Africa," is a reference to the fact that this region of Africa is also known as the pearl of Africa. The documentary was directed and narrated by filmmaker, Guy Lieberman, in association with producer Marion Segal, both South African Jews. Included in the documentary are interviews with Aaron Kintu Moses, J.J. Keki, Enosh K. Mainah, and other leaders of the Abayudaya, both in the Nabugoye Hill community and in the Putti community. It also includes interviews with two wives who show their Sabbath preparations, speak about their children's education, and discuss the intimate side of Jewish marriage and the need for a mikveh. The documentary generated considerable interest amongst the South African Jewish community and inspired members to make financial and other contributions (e.g. books) to the Abayudaya. Subsequent to this documentary, the South African Jewish community also hosted two of the younger generation of Abayudaya to share their stories at local Jewish events.

In 2003, J.J. Keki, a member of the Abayudaya community, led the effort to create a cooperative for coffee-growers in the region, including not only the Jewish coffee-growers, but Christian and Muslim coffee-growers as well. The result was Mirembe Kawomera, Luganda for "Delicious Peace". In partnership with Thanksgiving Coffee Company of Fort Bragg, California, the cooperative is working in bringing new prosperity to members of all religions.

== Religious life and customs ==
As the community increased its ties and interactions with outside Jewish communities, namely in the United States and Israel, its religious ideology and customs shifted towards mainstream Judaism. Members attend Shabbat services regularly both on Friday evenings and Saturdays. Congregations remove their shoes before entering the synagogue. This custom is believed to have been practiced by Jews in biblical times and is still practiced by a few Jewish communities today. The Abayudaya follow kashrut and slaughter their own animals accordingly.

== Music ==
Music has been an important aspect in the lives of the Abayudaya. In recent years, the community has produced two CDs that are centered on religious themes. One of the albums, entitled "Abayudaya: Music from the Jewish people of Uganda" was produced by Jeffrey Summit and nominated for a Best Traditional World Music album at the 47th Grammy Awards.

The music of the Abayudaya is distinctly African and it is Jewish at the same time. Many of the songs combine Luganda words with Hebrew words. Additionally, Psalms and prayers are set to a distinctly African tune and rhythm. Music is considered important by the community for a variety of reasons. Some elders of the community have stated that it was music that enabled the community to persevere through the harsh conditions that it was forced to endure during the rule of Idi Amin.

== See also ==
- Uganda Scheme
