= Bukedi District =

- Former district
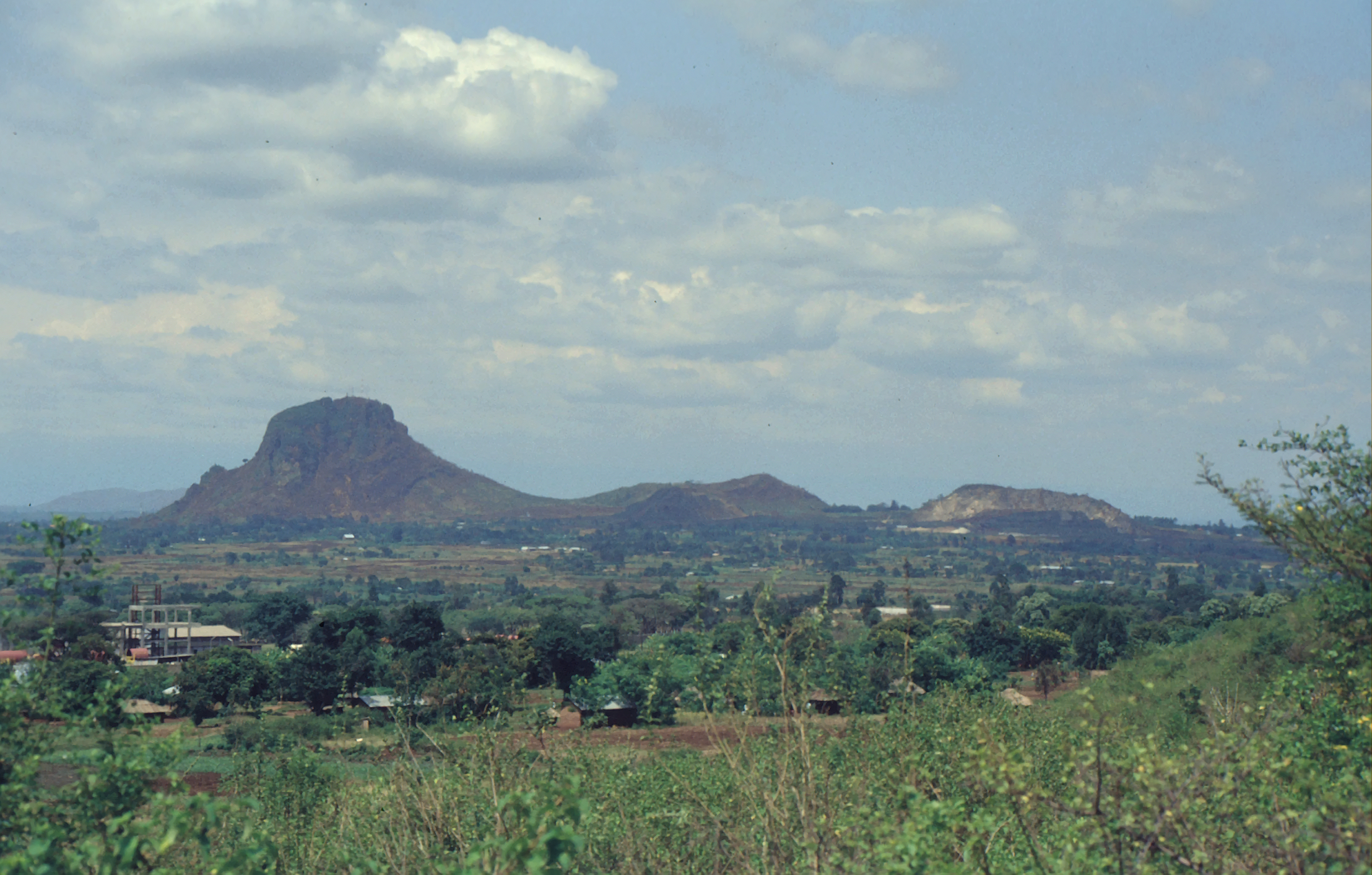
- Tororo Rock

- Location within Uganda
- Coordinates: 1.08°N 34.175°E
- Country: Uganda
- Province: Eastern

Bukedi District was a subdivision of the Eastern Province of the Uganda Protectorate, with headquarters in Mbale. In the early 1920s Bukedi was divided into the Budama, Bugisu and Bugwere districts. These were recombined into Mbale District during World War II (1939–1945), then split in 1954 into a new, smaller Bukedi District to the west and Bugisu District to the east, sharing Mbale Township as their administrative headquarters. In 1968 the administrative headquarters of Bukedi District were moved to Tororo. Later Bukedi District was split up into a number of smaller districts.

== Location ==
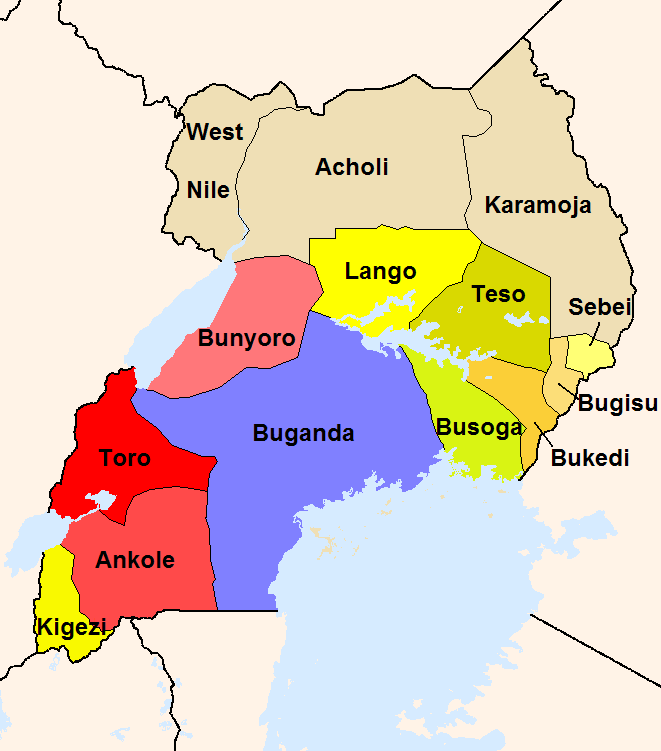
Subdivisions under the Ugandan Protectorate (1926 borders). (Click area to go to article.) The areas in red and blue hues had centralized kingdoms prior to British arrival, while the colonialists introduced centralized rule on the Baganda model to areas in yellow. Areas in khaki never had centralized kingdoms.

Bukedi District was in the east of Uganda, just north of Lake Victoria. The headquarters of the original Bukedi District was Mbale township, which lies on a strip of land between the plains that drain into Lake Kyoga to the west and the slopes of Mount Elgon to the east. Bukedi district contained Gisu people in the populous and mountainous northeast, and several other ethnic groups in the western and southern plains including the Nilotic Teso people and the Bantu Gwere people and Nyole people. The plains peoples were mostly acephalous. For many years Mbale was a focus of ethnic rivalry between the people of the plains and the Gisu people of the uplands.

== First Bukedi District and successors (to 1954) ==
At the end of the 19th century the Baganda leader Semei Kakungulu led his army into Bugisu against the Bangokho, then the Bawalasi and Bafumbo further north, and then south to Busoba where he built a fort named Nabumali. From here he raided into the mountains of southern Bugisu. In 1901 he created the county of Bubulo. The British followed Kakungulu, and although they placed him in retirement in 1902 in Mbale they used his Ganda followers as police and chiefs.

Sidney Ormsby was the first British Collector in the Bukedi District. By 1907 his administration only controlled the plains and lower foothills, while the Gisu settlements higher up on Elgon remained largely independent. John Methuen Coote joined the Uganda administration as an assistant collector on 24 November 1905. In December 1908 he returned to Uganda from leave in Europe and was again posted to the Bukedi District. Almost as soon as he arrived the District Commissioner, Sydney Ormsby, died. Coote took over as District Commissioner at Mbale.

At the end of May 1909 a runner brought Coote orders to report to Entebbe. There he was told to go to Mbarara and there take charge of a mixed force of Sikhs, King's African Rifles and Police as Political Officer. With this force he was to establish a post on Lake Kivu and to administer the surrounding district - the start of the Kivu frontier incident. By 1911, according to the District Commissioner only one third of the Gisu, those of the plains and foothills, were under administration.. A punitive expedition in 1912 in what became Manjiya County managed to subdue the region..

After World War I (1914–1918) Bukedi District was divided in 1924 into Budama (HQ Tororo), Bugisu (HQ Bubulo) and Bugwere (HG Mbale).. Mbale township was the administrative headquarters of Bugwere District. In 1937 Bugwere and Bugisu were amalgamated, with Mbale as the administrative center. During World War II (1939––1945) Budama, Bugisu and Bugwere were merged into Mbale District to reduce costs.

== Second Bukedi District (1954–1991) ==
In 1954 Bugwere and Bugisu were separated again, and Bugwere was again combined with Budama to create Bukedi District. The town of Mbale remained the administrative capital of these districts, but was made a "territory" separate from both Bugisu and Bukedi. From 1954 to 1967 Bukedi District, Bugisu District and Mbale District were all administered from Mbale. Charles Oboth Ofumbi was appointed district commissioner for Bukedi District in 1960.

Ethnic tension grew as independence approached. The Gisu people wanted to make Mbale "their" town, while the Gwere people resented the presence of the Bagisu in Mbale and resented having to cross a narrow part of Bugisu District to reach Mbale. In 1962 the government appointed a special commission of inquiry. It recommended changing the borders so Bukedi District would directly adjoin Mbale, while making the town part of Bugisu. The Bukedi administrative center would be moved to Tororo. However, in the short term nothing was changed. In 1962 the leaders of the Padhola people in West Budama county wanted to spilt out a new Budama District. This was because the Bukedi District administration was dominated by the Bagwere and Banyuli people.

By the end of the 1950s there were often complaints about the chiefs in the district, who were abusing their power by assessing taxes unfairly and demanding that adult men do work other than community work. In January 1960 there were riots throughout Bukedi District. The ostensible cause of the riots were the unfair tax assessments, but there was also a religious element where the mainly Catholic people thought the Protestand chiefs were favoring the minority of Protestant people. After the riots many people refused to pay taxes and administration was handicapped by loss of authority by the chiefs. In 1961-1962 there were severe floods that caused much damage to the cotton crop.

For many years the people of Bukedi District, particularly West Budana, suffered from malnutrition. A Food and Nutrition Project was undertaken in Bukedi District from July 1960 to the end of 1963 with assistance from UNICEF and the Food and Agriculture Organization. At that time the district had a population of 400,000 to 500,000 people in an area of 1,770 square miles (4,600 km^{2}). The project was poorly organized, with poorly defined scope, frequent changes of staff and personnel who often knew nothing about nutrition. Many did not understand the difference between proteins and calories, and most thought the main goal was to increase production of exotic fruits and vegetables. One instructor wanted babies to be weaned from breast milk at six weeks of age and then bottle fed on commercial foods. Overall, the project was a failure.

In 1967 the new constitution placed Mbale and the surrounding strip of land in Bugisu, while Tororo was to become the administrative center of Bukedi. The district headquarters were moved from Mbale to Tororo as of 1968. The district contained the counties of Pallisa, Budaka-Bugwere, Bunyole, West Budama, Tororo, and Samia-Bugwe. In February 1973 President Idi Amin announced a major restructuring of the five regions into nine provinces. Bukedi District became part of Tira Province, which also included North Busoga District and Jinja District. The name was later changed to Tororo District under Amin's regime. North Bukedi District was separated from Tororo District in 1976, but this change was cancelled after the Uganda–Tanzania War of 1979 deposed Amin.

== Current districts ==
Bukedi District was later split into Busia District, Tororo District, Pallisa District, Butaleja District, and Kibuku District. In March 1991 Pallisa District, the same area as the former North Bukedi District, was split out of Tororo District. Kibuku District was created 1 July 2010 from Pallisa District. Budaka District, formerly a county, was also split out of Pallisa District. Later Busia District and Butaleja District were also created from Tororo District.

Pallisa

Kibuku

Budaka

Butaleja

Tororo

Busia

== Sources ==
- Ayre, Peter (2018), "COOTE, John Methuen OBE", Europeans In East Africa
- Gulliver, P. H. (2021-01-08), Tradition and Transition in East Africa: Studies of the Tribal Element in the Modern Era, Univ of California Press, ISBN 978-0-520-36825-5
- Heald, Suzette (1989), Controlling Anger: The Sociology of Gisu Violence, Manchester University Press, ISBN 978-0-7190-2566-2}
- Hirst, Michael A. (September 2010), "The Changing Pattern of District Administrative Centres in Uganda since 1900", Geographical Analysis, 3 (1): 90–98, doi:10.1111/j.1538-4632.1971.tb00351.x
- History, Budaka District
- History & Background, Tororo District
- Joint Publications Research Service (1973), Translations on Sub-Saharan Africa, United States
- Kasfir, Nelson (2021-01-08), The Shrinking Political Arena: Participation and Ethnicity in African Politics, with a Case Study of Uganda, Univ of California Press, ISBN 978-0-520-36173-7
- Lubega, Henry (26 July 2015), "Uganda: Oboth Ofumbi's Nine Days As Acting President", The Monitor
- Ocwich, Denis (7 August 2005), "Can Uganda's Economy Support More Districts?", New Vision (Kampala), archived from the original on 29 May 2015
- Overview, Pallisa District
- Sharman, Anne (2012-12-06), "Improving Nutrition in Bukedi District", Government and Rural Development in East Africa: Essays on Political Penetration, Springer Science & Business Media, ISBN 978-94-010-1030-6
