= Putti, Uganda =

Putti is a village in the Pallisa District of Uganda. Putti is inhabited largely by the Abayudaya people. The villagers of Putti are undergoing an Orthodox Jewish conversion to Judaism.

== Community life ==
Putti is an agrarian village. The community centers around the She'erit Yisra'el Synagogue, which has about 150 members. The congregation is collectively known as the Kahal Kadosh She'erit Yisra'el or KKSY (Holy Congregation Remnant of Israel). Putti villagers practice Judaism according to Orthodox (Sephardi) halakha and are candidates for Orthodox conversion. Local members perform brit milah on baby boys at eight days old, keep kashrut, observe the Shabbat, the Jewish holy days and the laws of family purity Taharat haMishpacha.

The community was founded around 1920 when the Chief of the District Semei Kakungulu, angry at the (British) Christians who had betrayed him, felt an affinity for the Jews of the Old Testament. He declared his community would now be Jewish and based their practices on what he understood from reading the Bible and meeting Jewish travelers. After the period of harsh oppression under Idi Amin, a few of the community members visited the Synagogue in Nairobi and began to incorporate the practices they observed into their own worship.

Eventually the worldwide Jewish community became aware of a Jewish presence in Uganda through the efforts of a young peace corp volunteer. Reform and Conservative Jews offered to assist them. The majority of Jewish settlements around Mbale accepted this support, which included Jewish artifacts, financial support and non-orthodox conversion and acceptance. However, the community in Putti did not go along with the rest of the Abayudaya and hopes to receive orthodox-accepted conversion.

Through the efforts of Rabbi Shlomo Riskin, founding Chief Rabbi of Efrat and Chancellor of the Ohr Torah Stone institute, in coordination with PVAO (Putti Village Assistance Organization) a new mikveh (ritual bath) was built and fundraising efforts began for a new synagogue. The community is governed by an elected board chaired by Tarphon Kamya. Putti village receives outside support from PVAO (Putti Village Assistance Organization).

== Persecution ==
During the reign of Idi Amin, Judaism was banned in Uganda and the community almost disappeared.
