= Nabumali =

Village in Uganda

- Village
- Location within Uganda
- Coordinates: 0.980502°N 34.203092°E
- Country: Uganda
- District: Mbale District
- County: Bungokho County
- Sub County: Busoba Sub-County
- Established: 1901
- Founder: Semei Kakungulu
- Elevation: 1,269 m (4,163 ft)
- Area codes: for multiple area codes

Nabumali is a village in Mbale District in eastern Uganda. It is known for its high school, which is over 100 years old.

== Location ==
Nabumali is a village in Mbale District. It is off the Tororo – Mbale road, approximately 11 kilometres (6.8 mi), south of the city of Mbale. It is in the foothills of Mount Elgon. Nabumali town council has an area of 11.1 square kilometres (4.3 sq mi). The estimated population as of 2020 was 4,400. The Köppen climate classification is Am : Tropical monsoon climate.

== Foundation ==
At the end of the 19th century the Baganda leader Semei Kakungulu led his army into Bugisu against the Bangokho, then the Bawalasi and Bafumbo further north, and then south to Busoba where he built a fort named Nabumali. From here he raided into the mountains of southern Bugisu. The British followed Kakungulu, and although they placed him in retirement in 1902 in Mbale they used his Ganda followers as police and chiefs.

== School ==
Nabumali High School was founded by the Church Mission Society (CMS) at Mivule near the town of Mbale, and was moved to Nabumale in 1912. For many years Archdeacon Henry Mathers (1877–1951) of the CMS Nabumali Mission was the official patron of the Bagishu Welfare Association. This was a largely Anglican organization with the stated objectives of working for the uplift of the Gisu people, developing the land and assisting members who needed help. On 16 June 1970 President Milton Obote told the assembled students of Nabumali High School, "We must have this One Uganda; we must have this One People; we must have this One Parliament, so that the youth of Uganda of today and tomorrow will see Uganda as a whole…. We must begin to have our own history". In 2012 President Yoweri Museveni attended the school's centenary celebrations.

== Sources ==
- Ashley L. Greene (2017), "Creating a Nation Without a Past", in Bellino M.J.; Williams J.H. (eds.), (Re)Constructing Memory: Education, Identity, and Conflict., Rotterdam: SensePublishers, pp. 101–125, doi:10.1007/978-94-6300-860-0_5, ISBN 978-94-6300-860-0
- Darlington Sakwa, A brief on Nabumali High School
- Gulliver, P. H. (1969), Tradition and Transition in East Africa, University of California Press, GGKEY:WAZ9JUYATPR
- Heald, Suzette (1989), Controlling Anger: The Sociology of Gisu Violence, Manchester University Press, ISBN 978-0-7190-2566-2}
- "Nabumali, Nyondo, Bungokho County, Mbale District, Eastern Region, Uganda", Mindat
- "Nabumali Town Council in Eastern Region", CityPopulation
- President Museveni attends Nabumali Centenary celebrations; says he will not apologize for universal education programme, The State House of Uganda, 17 June 2012
- "Road Distance Between Nabumali And Mbale With Map", Distancecalculator, GlobeFeed.com
