= Congregation Beth Am =

Reform Jewish synagogue in California, US

- Hebrew: בית עם
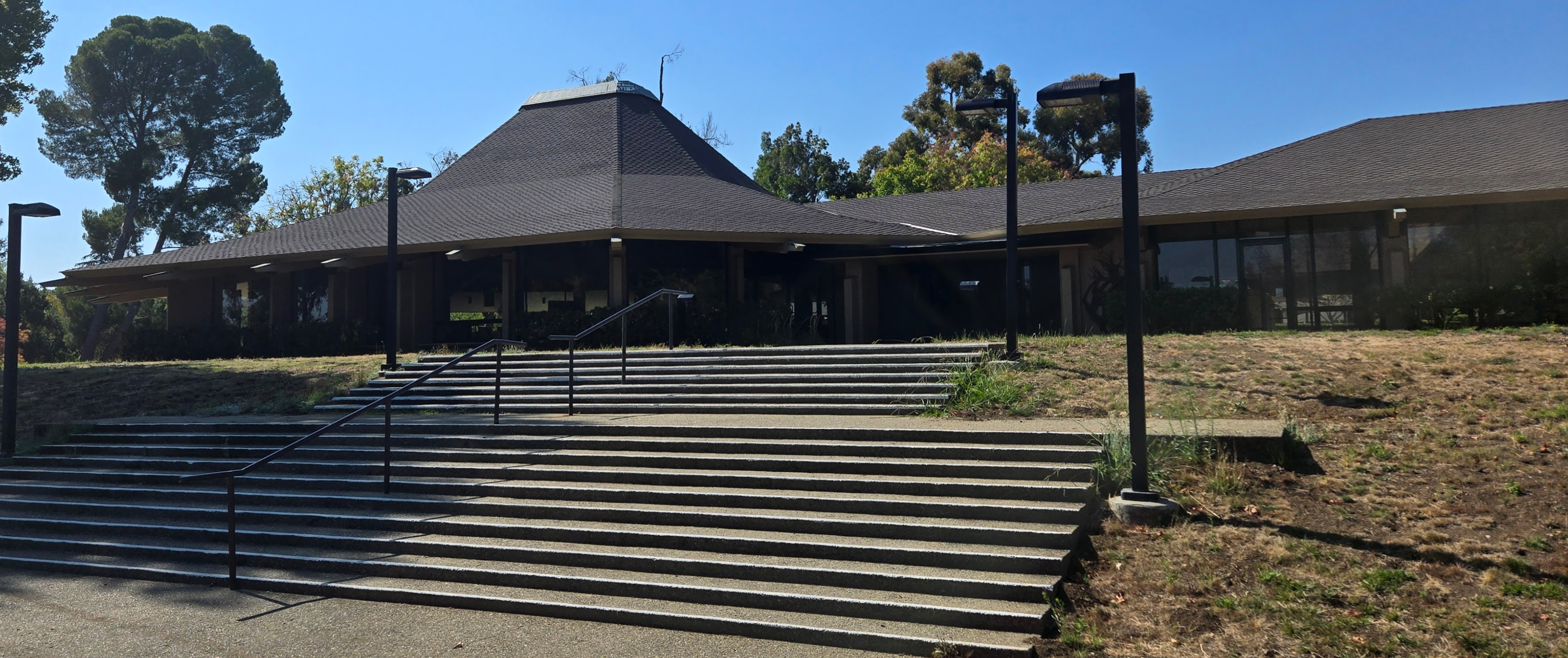

- Location in San Francisco Bay Area, California

Religion
- Affiliation: Reform Judaism
- Rite: Nusach Ashkenaz
- Ecclesiastical or organisational status: Synagogue
- Status: Active

Location
- Location: 26790 Arastradero Road, Los Altos Hills, California
- Country: United States
- Coordinates: 37°23′36″N 122°08′42″W

Architecture
- Architect: Goodwin Steinberg
- Type: Synagogue architecture

Website
- betham.org

Beth Am logo

Congregation Beth Am (Hebrew: בית עם, lit. 'People's House') is a Reform Jewish congregation and synagogue, located in Los Altos Hills, California, in the United States.

The congregation is a member of the Union for Reform Judaism.

Beth Am has a sister congregation in Poltava, Ukraine, also known as Beth Am. Beth Am has a program aimed at helping emigrant families from the former Soviet Union. Two congregation members have won Nobel Prizes.
