= Gershom Sizomu =

Honorable

Personal details
- Born: Gershom Sizomu; 18 February 1969 (age 57) Abayudaya, Uganda
- Citizenship: Uganda
- Education: Islamic University In Uganda; American Jewish University
- Occupation: Teacher, rabbi, politician
- Known for: Chief rabbi of Uganda, politics

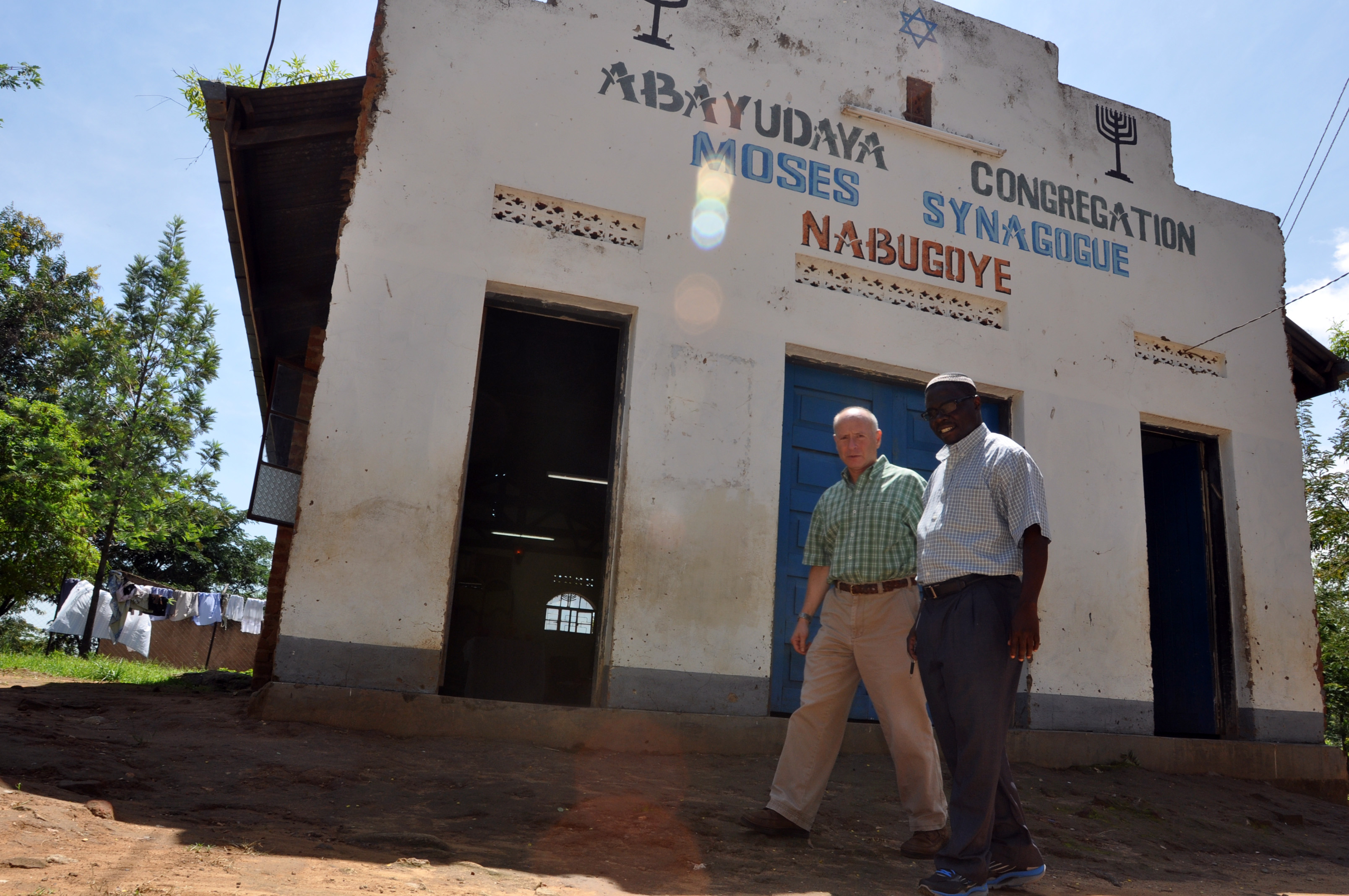
Capt. Jon Cutler, a chaplain and the religious affairs director for Combined Joint Task Force – Horn of Africa, walks with Rabbi Gershom Sizomu at the Moses Synagogue, Abayudaya

Gershom Sizomu (born 1969) is a Ugandan rabbi serving the Abayudaya, a Baganda community in eastern Uganda near the town of Mbale who practice Judaism. Sizomu is the first native-born black rabbi in Sub-Saharan Africa. He is also the first Chief Rabbi of Uganda, and the first member of the Abayudaya to be ordained as a rabbi in the United States. Sizomu was a member of the Ugandan Parliament from 2016 until 2026.

== Childhood ==
Sizomu was born into an Abayudaya family, and his grandfather was the community's leader. The Abayudaya were persecuted during the years of the Idi Amin regime, when it was illegal to openly practice the Jewish faith in Uganda. During his childhood, Sizomu's father was arrested for building a sukkah as part of the celebration of the Jewish holiday Sukkot. His father was released when Sizomu's family paid the arresting officer with a ransom of five goats. In 1979, following the overthrow of the Amin government, freedom of religion was restored in Uganda, and Sizomu's family celebrated by hosting 200 people in a Passover Seder consisting of homemade matzoh and macco, a Ugandan banana wine with an 80 per cent alcohol content.

== Education ==
The Abayudaya was not recognized by the government of Israel as being Jewish because the community had not formally converted to Judaism. In 2003, Sizomu sought Israeli approval of the Abayudaya by inviting four U.S. rabbis to conduct a conversion ceremony for 300 Abayudaya Jews, which they did in 2003, in a ceremony consisting of the question, 'Why do you want to be Jewish?', to which the Abayudaya responded: "I was born Jewish and I'd like to stay Jewish." Others refused to take part saying: "We're already Jewish." Sizomu has openly identified himself as a Zionist and once stated in an interview: "If the Arab world declared war on Israel, we would fight and die to protect it."

Sizomu earned a Bachelor of Arts in education from Islamic University in Uganda. As a Be'chol Lashon Rabbinic Fellow at the Institute for Jewish & Community Research, he came to the U.S. to 2003 to study in a five-year graduate program at the Ziegler School of Rabbinic Studies at the American Jewish University in Los Angeles. He graduated in 2008 and was ordained as a rabbi under the auspices of Conservative Judaism.

== Rabbinical activities ==
In July 2008, Sizomu returned to Uganda and conducted a conversion ceremony for 250 people at the village of Nabogoya, with converts coming from across Uganda and from Kenya, Nigeria and South Africa. During the ceremony, Sizomu stressed the viability of the Jewish faith for sub-Saharan Africans by noting, "The relationship between God and the Jews in the Torah resonates for many spiritual seekers. It is important that Africans and others know that they can choose Judaism as a spiritual path and that we are open to them."

== Political activities ==
Rabbi Sizomu was a candidate to represent Uganda's Bungokho North District in Parliament in the 2011 election, held on February 18, 2011. He lost that election, but ran again in 2016 and was elected to Parliament in a close race. He lost to Umar Nangoli in the 2026 election.
