= Nangolo =

Nangolo is a name of Namibian origin that may refer to:

- Nangolo Ithete (1941–2002), Namibian politician
- Nangolo Mbumba (born 1941), Namibian politician
- Fillemon Nduuvu Nangolo, (born 1952), Namibian war hero
- Fillemon Shuumbwa Nangolo (born 1974), reigning king of Ondonga kingdom, a sub-tribe of Owambo people
- Mvula ya Nangolo (1943–2019), Namibian journalist and poet
