= Society of the One Almighty God =

Malakite Church

The Society of the One Almighty God, popularly known as the Malakite Church and with its members often called the Malakites, was a Christian church in Uganda formed by Musajjakawa Malaki in 1914. It was also known as the Bamalaki sect.

Malaki was highly influenced in his religious beliefs by Joswa Kate Mugema.

Bamalaki teachings allowed for polygamy, rejected idol worship, and called for the Sabbath to be observed on Saturday. The last caused extensive problems with the British authorities.

The Church was strongly anti-colonialist and anti-Western, rejecting among other things Western medicine. By 1921 the movement had approximately 100,000 followers. Most of the members of this Church were Baganda people.

== Sources ==
- Dictionary of African Christian Biography entry on Malaki
