= Semei Kakungulu =

Ugandan chief

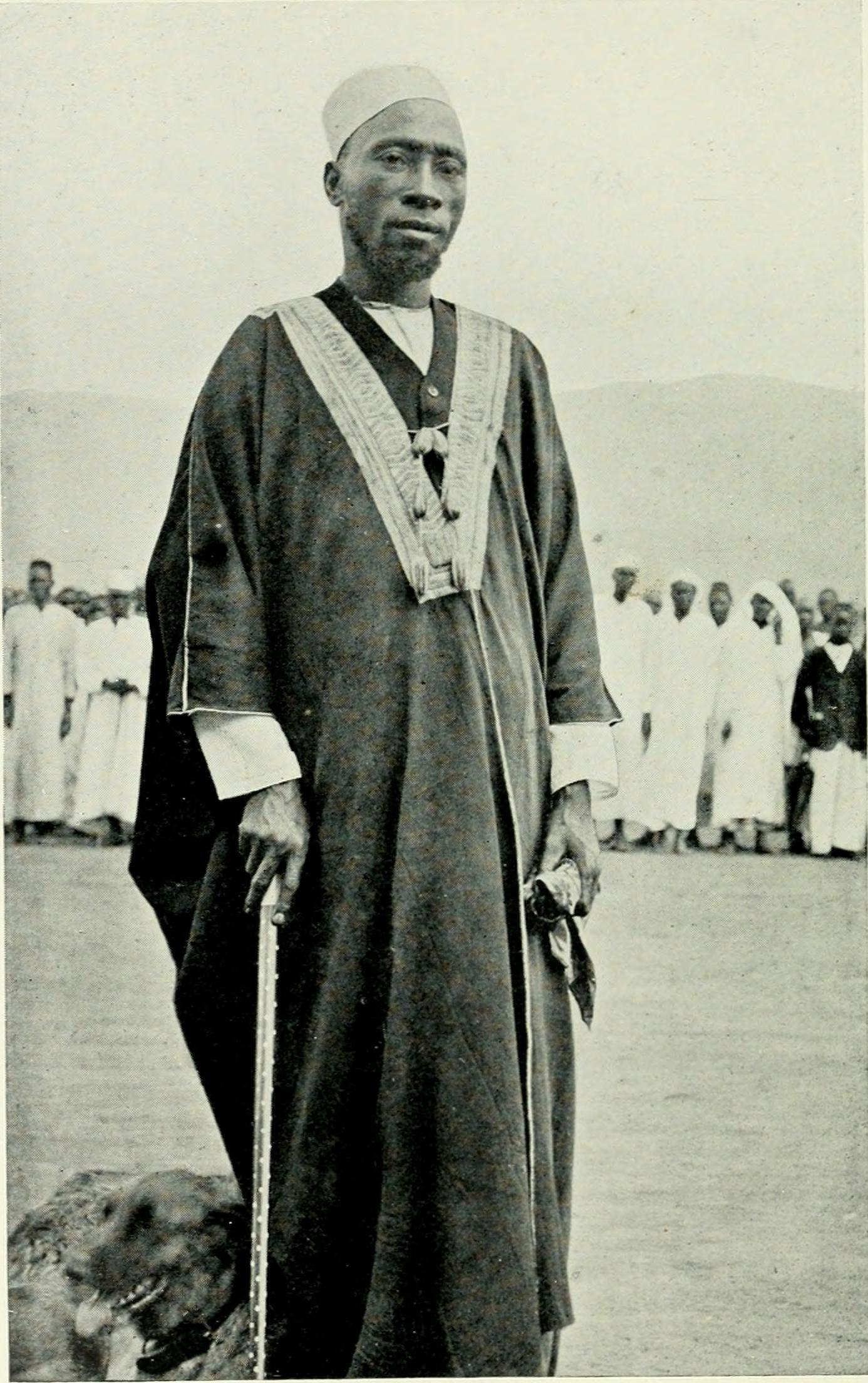
- Semei Kakungulu
- Born: 1869; Kooki
- Died: 1928 (aged 58–59); Mbale City
- Known for: Founder of Abayudaya Judaism

Semei Kakungulu (1869–24 November 1928) was a Mukooki General and Ugandan statesman who founded the Abayudaya community in Uganda in 1917. ("Abayudaya" is a Luganda term meaning "Jews".) He studied and meditated on the Tanakh, adopted the observance of all Moses' commandments, including circumcision, and suggested this observance for all his followers. The Abayudaya have converted to Judaism, mostly through the Reform and Conservative movements, while some have undergone Orthodox conversion. The Abayudaya do not claim ancient Israelite ancestry.

The British colonists also chose him as president of the Lukiiko of Busoga, and in effect he became Busoga's first 'king', but the British refused to give him that title. Although conflicts among the different chiefs and clans continued, most Basoga remained loyal to their own chief, clan or dialect. The Lukiiko structure collapsed, and the British dismissed Kakungulu.

== Early life ==
Kakungulu was a warrior and statesman of the powerful Buganda Kingdom. During the 1880s, he was converted to Christianity by a Protestant missionary who taught him how to read the Bible in Swahili. His command of many warriors, his connections to the Bugandan court, and his Protestant faith made him a valuable ally, and the British sought his support in imposing their imperial rule in eastern Uganda. He responded by conquering and bringing under the British sphere of influence two areas outside of the Bugandan Empire, Bukedi and Busoga—situated between the Nile River's source in Lake Victoria and Mt. Elgon on the Kenyan border.

Kakungulu believed that the British would allow him to become the king of Bukedi and Busoga, but the British preferred to rule these areas through civil servants in their pay and under their control. The British limited Kakungulu to a 20-square-mile (52 km^{2}) area in and around what has now become Mbale, Uganda. The people who inhabited this area were of the Bagisu tribe, rivals of the Baganda. Nevertheless, Kakungulu was able to maintain control with the help of his Baganda followers, now much reduced in numbers, so long as he received British support.

Beginning in about 1900, a slow but continuous mutual disenchantment arose between Kakungulu and the British. In 1913, Kakungulu became a Malakite Christian—a movement described by the British as a "cult" combining elements of Judaism, Christianity, and Christian Science. Many who joined Malaki, the movement under Kakungulu's influence, were Baganda.

While still a Malakite, Kakungulu came to the conclusion that the Christian missionaries were not reading the Bible correctly. He pointed out that the Europeans disregarded the real Sabbath, which was Saturday, not Sunday. As proof, he argued that Jesus was buried on the Friday before the Sabbath, and that his mother and his disciples did not visit the tomb the following day, because it was the Sabbath, but waited until Sunday.

== Judaism ==
In 1917, under pressure from the British, who wished to limit his holdings, Kakungulu moved his principal residence to Gangama, a hill in the western foothills of Mount Elgon in Mbale District. It was there that he started a separatist sect initially known as Kibiina Kya Bayudaya Absesiga Katonda (the Community of Jews who trust in the omnipotent God). Recruitment into this Bayudaya community came almost exclusively from what remained of Kakungulu's Baganda following.

The Bible was held in high regard among the Christians of Uganda, partly as a result of missionary teaching. The missionaries had stressed the truth of the Bible by emphasizing that it originated not with Europeans but with an alien race, the Jews — a point intended to impress upon Africans that Europeans too had received truth from an outside source. As a consequence, the customs and manners of the Jews became of great interest to Kakungulu's followers.

In 1922, at Gangama, Kakungulu published a 90-page book of rules and prayers as a guide for his Jewish community. The book set forth Jewish laws and practices as Kakungulu found them in the Hebrew Bible, although it contained many verses and sections from the New Testament as well. Despite this interest in Jewish practices, there does not appear to have been any direct contact between Kakungulu and Jews before 1925.

Beginning in about 1925, several European Jews who were employed as mechanics and engineers by the British chanced upon the Christian-Jewish community near Mbale. Jews such as these, during what appear to have been chance encounters, told Kakungulu about Orthodox Judaism. As a result, many remaining Christian customs were dropped, including baptism. From these encounters, the community learned to keep Shabbat, to recite Hebrew prayers and blessings, to slaughter animals for meat in a Kosher manner, and also to speak some Hebrew.

== Death ==
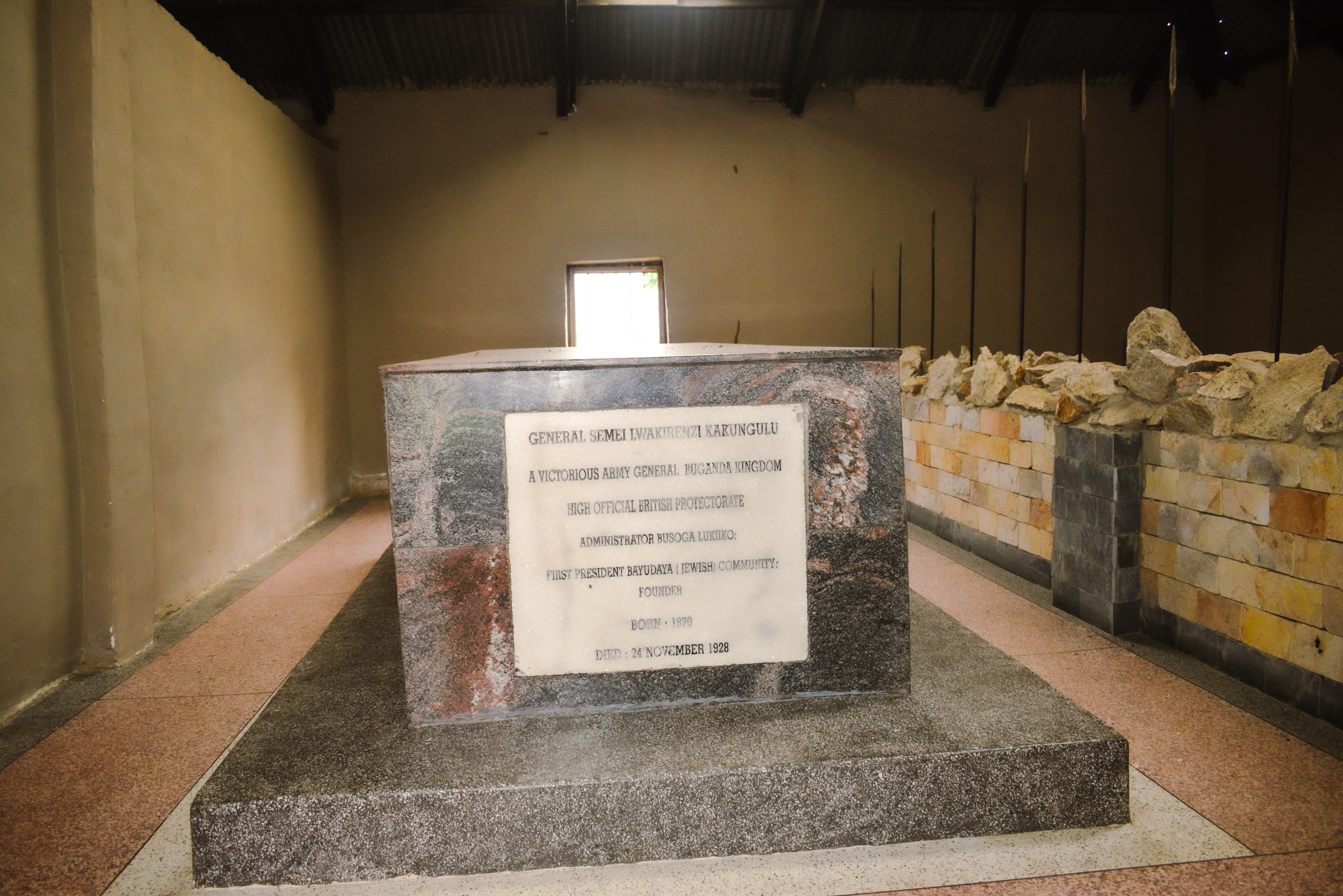
Grave of Semei Kakungulu at Gangama hill - Mbale city

Kakungulu died on 24 November 1928 of tetanus. After his death, the Abayudaya community divided into those wishing to retain a toehold within Christianity and those wanting to break those ties completely. The Bayudaya "remained a mixture of both Christianity and Judaism, with faith in Christ remaining prominent in Kakungulu's beliefs." Kakungulu is buried a short distance from the main Abayudaya synagogue behind the home in which he lived during the last years of his life. The grave's epitaph reads:

General Semei Lwakirenzi Kakungulu

A Victorious Army General Buganda Kingdom

High Official British Protectorate

Administrator Busoga Lukiiko;

First President Bayudaya (Jewish) Community;

Founder

Born: 1870

Died: 24 November 1928

== See also ==
- African Jews
- Beta Israel
- Ten Lost Tribes
