= The Busoga Royal Weddings =

Royal Weddings of Busoga Kingdom

A Busoga Royal Wedding is a wedding ceremony where the Kyabazinga of Busoga officially weds the Inhebantu of Busoga. It is a celebration for the entire Busoga Kingdom.

== 1956 Busoga royal wedding (Henry Wako Muloki and Alice Kintu Muloki) ==
This was the first royal wedding and it happened on 21 January 1956 when Henry Wako Muloki married Alice Muloki. Kabaka Muteesa II of Buganda was the best man of Henry Wako Muloki. Their marriage resulted in the birth of Eight children (four princes and four princesses).

== 2023 Busoga royal wedding (William Gabula and Jovia Mutesi) ==
Before William Gabula and Jovia Mutesi's Busoga Royal wedding, the previous one was held in 1956.

Jovia Mutesi was announced as the Inhebantu of Busonga on the 7 September 2023 at the Busoga Headquarters in Bugembe by Joseph Muvawala as he held her portrait in his hands.

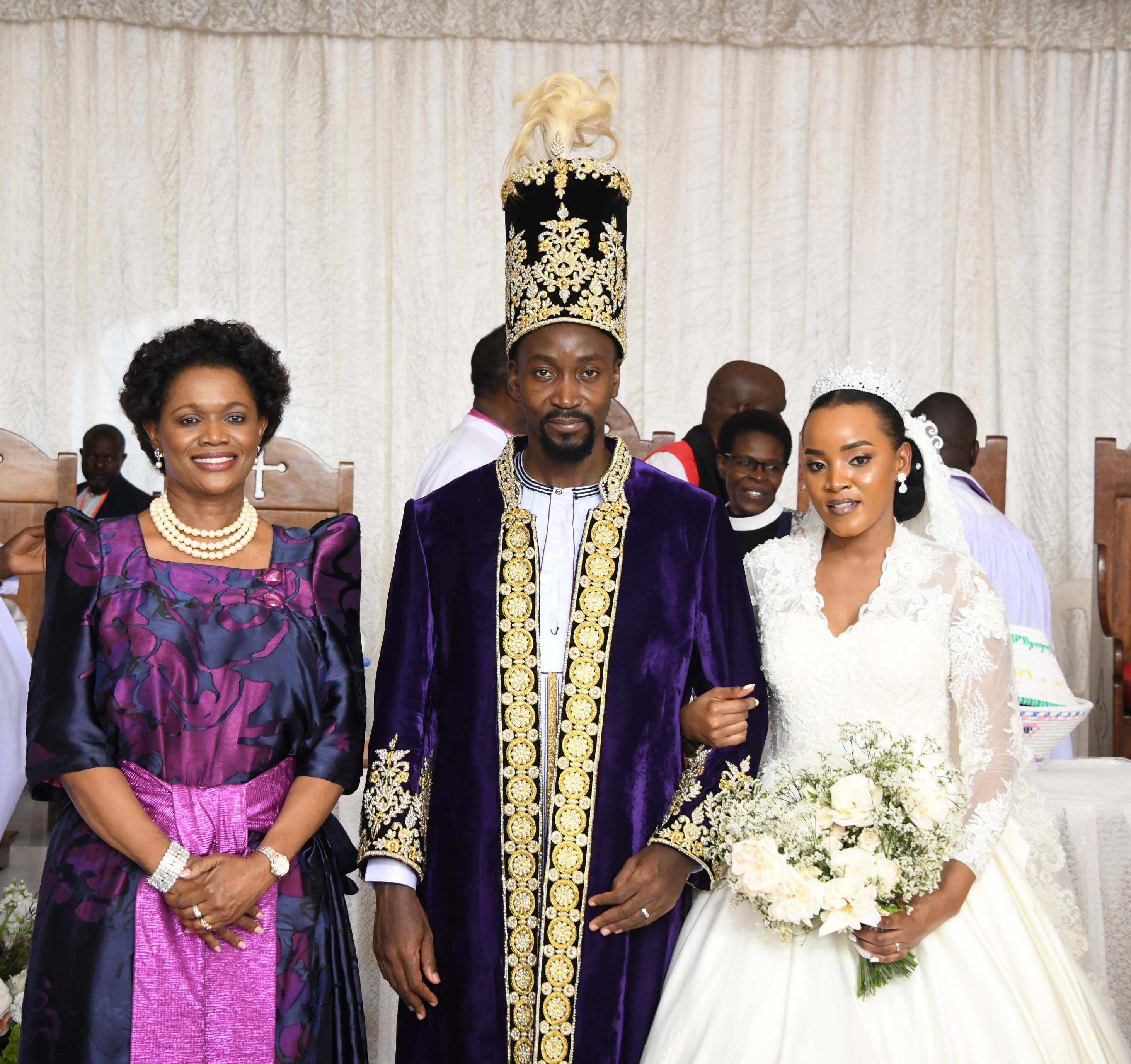
Nnaabagereka Sylvia Nagginda Kyabazinga William Gabula & Inhebantu Jovia Mutesi.jpg

=== Organising committee for the 2023 Busoga Royal Wedding ===
A 21-member committee that was responsible for organising the 2023 Busoga Royal wedding was announced by Joseph Muvawala Nsekere (The prime minister of Busoga) during the Kyabazinga's ninth coronation anniversary that was held at Namungalwe saza grounds in Kigulu chiefdom in Iganga District. The committee was to be led by Patrick Batumbya.

=== Security at the wedding ===
The government of Uganda deployed Uganda police officers, UPDF soldiers and special forces to ensure security with in Jinja and at the venue of the 2023 Busoga royal wedding.

=== Visiting Jovia Mutesi's parents ===
Kyabazinga William Gabula visited the parents of Jovia Mutesi in her ancestral home in Mayuge district on a private traditional ceremony. The Kyabazinga decides the dowry to give to the family of the Inhebantu. The dowry that was taken to Jovia Mutesi's family was not disclosed to the public.

=== Exchanging of wedding vows ===
William Gabula and Jovia Mutesi exchanged their wedding vows on the 18 November 2023 at Christ's Cathedral Bugembe in Jinja at 1:43pm (EAT). Their wedding was presided over by the most Reverend Stephen Kazzimba Mugalu (The Archbishop of Church of Uganda) who wedded the royal couple. A choir of 100+ members sang during the 2023 Busoga royal wedding.

William Gabula became the first Kyabazinga to be wedded at the Christ's church cathedral in Jinja.

The Busoga cultural marriage rituals were also performed at the palace.

=== The royal kiss ===
William Gabula and Jovia Mutesi did not kiss at the 2023 Busoga royal wedding.

=== Invited guests ===
Over 2,000+ guests were invited including representatives from the various kingdoms and chiefdoms who included Sylivia Nagginda, Margaret Adyeri karuga, Best Kemigisha Olimi, Omugo Margaret Karuga, officials from Eswatini; government of Uganda officials who included Thomas Tayebwa, Jessica Alupo; Church of Uganda representatives, Rebecca kadaga, Ugandan pastors among other people.

Yoweri Museveni did not attend the 2023 Busoga royal wedding but he was represented by Jessica Alupo as he was supervising the ongoing infrastructural developments in Kampala ahead of Uganda hosting the 19th Non-Aligned Movement (NAM) summit from 15 to 23 January 2024, Group of 77 (G-77) summit and China Third South summit from 21 to 24 January 2024.

Museveni gave 20 cows to the royal couple and also his son muhoozi Kainerugaba contributed 10 cows and the Thomas Tayebwa gave 5 cows, Jessica Alupo gave two cows. And many other gifts were given to the Kyabazinga.

=== Wedding reception ===
William Gabula and Jovia Mutesi held their wedding receiption at Igenge Palace in Jinja on the 18 November 2023.

=== William Gabula's speech ===
In his speech, the William Gabula told the people to cultivate food crops to promote food security in families and also plant trees in all institutions to protect the environment. He also urged the Basoga to sell land and that if the wanted to do so, they should go through the proper channels such as the Busoga Land Board.

=== Jovia Mutesi's speech ===
In her speech Jovia Mutesi promised to make William Gabula the happiest man on earth.

=== No sex for all the Basonga during the Kyabazinga's wedding eve ===
All the Basonga were urged not to have sexual intercourse on the wedding eve of the Kyabazinga William Gabula and Jovia Mutesi.

=== Contributions towards the 2023 Busoga royal wedding ===
==== The Busoga royal banquet / dinner ====
On 27 October 2023, the Busoga royal dinner was held at Kololo Ceremonial grounds under the theme "Experience royalty as you peep into the royal wedding." to fundraise money for the Busoga Royal wedding. It was an invite only banquet where each table cost UGX 500,000 per seat and UGX 5,000,000 per table.

Many performers and entertainers included; the Afrigo band, Nile Beat cultural Troupe, Kadabada (a Busoga Artiste), Joseph Sax.

More than UGX 400 million was collected at this banquet.

==== Contributions from corporations ====
Different corporations and organisations in Uganda contributed an amount above 1.7 billion Uganda shillings towards wedding under the theme that was termed a contribution to protect culture, values and traditions. The corporations contributions included; Nation Media Group (UGX 198 million), Nile Breweries (UGX 450 million), Next Media Services (UGX 500 million), MTN Uganda (UGX 250 million), Airtel Uganda (UGX 265 million) and many other companies contributed not only with money but also gave other items such as beverages by Century Bottling Company and animals.

=== Controversies ===
==== Claiming that the Kyabazinga William Gabula is already married ====
Alison Anna Nadiope claimed that William Gabula was already married to her under marriage certificate AK5947291 in December 2016 at Milldam House Bunbaby Road, Portsmouth PO13AF and they have never divorced. She sent took William Gabula filed for a court case in Britain through Anne Cuthbert Solicitors Limited. Alison claimed that she demanded Busoga kingdom 750 million Ugandan shillings.

On 8 November Mugerwa and Partners Advocates and Solicitors filed a petition on behalf of Alison Anna Nadiope to both Archbishop of Church of Uganda and also the Bishop of Busoga Diocese which was meant to stop the Busoga Royal wedding for William Gabula and Jovia Mutesi. No proof of the marriage certificate was presented by Alison for her marriage with William Gabula was published publicly. Church of Uganda later cleared the wedding to take place.

Joseph Muvawala (Prime minister of Busoga) requested that all those who were involved in the circulating of the false court documents that were sent by Alison Anna should be arrested by the Uganda police. He also ordered the Busoga Kingdom lawyers to take legal action against all the people that were involved in circulating those documents. Muvawala also mentioned that the Kyabazinga has never married anyone and also that he had never sired any children.

==== Disrepecting the Kyabazinga William Gabula ====
During his speech, Muhoozi Kainerugaba requested the Kyabazinga William Gabula to go and collect the cows that had been given to him as a wedding present at his family home and that the Kyabazinga had become a member of their family. Most of the Ugandans especially the Basoga saw it as a sign of disrespecting the Kyabazinga.

==== A journalist blackmailed the Kyabazinga William Gabula's Father in Law (Stanley Bayole). ====
The Uganda police arrested the journalist who blackmailed the Stanley Bayole with an intention of extorting 200 million from him so that he does not share the information about Bayole's family with the public. But he was later released on police bond.

When the suspected journalist published on his social media alleging that Stanley Bayole was not the biological father of Jovia Mutesi

==== A car from the Kyabazinga's convoy knocking people ====
On 18 November 2023, a moving Toyota Super custom car from the Kyabazinga's ancestral home in Budhumbula in Kamuli swerved of the road into crowd at Nawantumbi Trading centre in Nawanyago as its driver was trying to dodge a taxi that had packed on the pavement. The Toyota super custom knocked five people in the age range of 12 to 37 and they died immediately. Other three people got injuries and died on the way as they were being rushed to the hospital.

==== Lawyer Male Mbabirizi Kiwanuka sued William Gabula, Jovia Mutesi, Stephen Kazzimba Mugalu and Sylivia Nagginda after the 2023 Busoga royal wedding ====
Lawyer Mbabirizi sued William Gabula, Jovia Mutesi under the allegations of an illegal marriage that they held on the 18 November 2023. Mbararizi alleges that the offences committed include; bigamy by the William Gabula as he was married to Alison Anna, marriage with a previously married person by Mutesi Jovia, unlawfully performing a marriage ceremony by the Stephen Kazzimba Mugalu, conspiring to commit felonies by Sylivia Nagginda.
