= Kabalega of Bunyoro =

Ruler of Ugandan kingdom (1853–1923)

Chwa II Kabalega (18 June 1853 – 6 April 1923), was the King or Omukama of Bunyoro in Uganda from 1870 to 1899. He is remembered for his fierce and sustained resistance to British Colonization.

== Biography ==
In 1869, Omukama Kamurasi Kyebambe IV died and two of the legitimate royal candidates - Kabalega and Kabigumire could not agree on who should be his successor. This led to a devastating war of succession in the Empire of Kitara. Normally, such wars to determine a legitimate successor were supposed to be brief and decisive until only one claimant to the throne was left alive. However, sometimes these conflicts dragged on for years, destabilising all of society and leading to famines, massacres and refugee crises. In this case, the clan leaders and the dead king's brother, Prince Nyaika, were so tired of Kabalega and Kabigumire's constant fighting that they ordered Kabalega, who had the upper hand, to respect Bunyoro's laws of succession and just-war conventions and end the war. When Kabalega was crowned king, he set out to develop his new empire via trade especially through the Kibiro Saltworks. On 1 January 1894, the British declared war on Bunyoro. At the height of the British offensive on his empire, Kabalega went into hiding in Acholi under the protection of Chief Awich Abok of Payira. It's from there that he consistently led the Nyangire rebellion that proved to be a thorn in the side of the British colonialists.

== History ==
Omukama Kabalega came into power in 1870 after struggling with his brother on who should succeed the throne.Kabalega implemented various positive social reforms, including the abolition of the slave trade and the promotion of human rights within his kingdom. He also built diplomatic relationships with other states. He centralized power by relying on military support rather than the traditional nobility. Due to Omukuma Kabalega's resistance to colonialism he built a strong and ruthless army commonly known as Abarusuura that were so ruthless. Kabalega was one of the few African monarchs to offer sustained and effective resistance to British and Egyptian imperial expansion. His forces notably defeated Sir Samuel Baker in 1872. When the British declared a protectorate over the region, Kabalega engaged them in a war that lasted nearly five years (1894–1899). Kabalega was later captured by British forces on April 9, 1899, along with his ally, Kabaka Mwanga II of Buganda. He was subsequently exiled to the Seychelles Islands, where he spent 24 years. While in exile, he continued his resistance to colonialism, writing letters and petitions to various leaders.

Omukama Kabalega died in Jinja, Uganda, on April 6, 1923, on his way back from exile. He was buried at Mparo, Hoima.

== Legacy ==
In 1972, Idi Amin renamed Murchison Falls, located within Murchison Falls National Park, Kabalega Falls after the Omukama.

On 8 June 2009, Kabalega was declared a national hero of Uganda by Museveni.

In 2010, the Most Honourable Order of Omukama Chwa II Kabalega was founded in honour of Kabalega by the Omukama of Bunyoro-Kitara

== Bibliography ==
- Otunnu, Ogenga (2016). Crisis of Legitimacy and Political Violence in Uganda, 1890 to 1979. Cham, Switzerland: Springer. p. 369. ISBN 9783319331560.

Preceded by Kyebambe IV	Omukama of Bunyoro; 1869–1898	Succeeded by Kitahimbwa

== See also ==
- Macwa of Nkore
- Mawanda of Buganda
- Alice Muloki
- Henry Wako Muloki
- Mulondo of Buganda
- Charles Mumbere
- Muteesa I of Buganda
- Mutesa II of Buganda
- Jovia Mutesi
- Muwenda Mutebi II of Buganda
- Mwanga II of Buganda
- Mwanga I of Buganda
- Nakibinge of Buganda
- Namuggala of Buganda
- Ndawula of Buganda
- Ntare IV of Nkore
