= Inhebantu of Busoga =

Royal title of the queen in Busoga Kingdom

Inhebantu of Busoga (Queen of Busoga), also known as Mother of Busoga, is the title given to the queen consort to the ruler of the Busoga Kingdom – the Kyabazinga of Busoga in Uganda.

The last Inhebantu was Alice Muloki, who died on November 6, 2005. The current Inhebantu from 7 September, 2023 is Jovia Mutesi who married the Kyabazinga William Wilberforce Gabula Nadiope IV of the Kingdom of Busoga (King of Busoga).

List of the queen consorts of Busoga since 1939
#	Name	From	To
1.	Yunia Nakibande		
2.	Susan Nansikombi Kaggwa		
3.	Yuliya Babirye Kadhumbula Nadiope		
4.	Alice Kintu Muloki Florence Violet	21 January 1956	6 November 2005
5.	Jovia Mutesi	18 November 2023	

== History ==
The title Inhebantu was introduced in 1956 as a description of the wife of the Isebantu or Kyabazinga. This epitomized the gradual unification of Busoga and the evolution of the kingship of the kingdom.

The first queen consort to attain the Inhebantu (Mother) of Busoga title in 1957 was Alice Florence Violet Muloki. Wife of H.R.H the Kyabazinga, Henry Wako Muloki.

== Currently ==
The current Inhebantu is Jovia Mutesi the first born and daughter of Stanley Bayole and Rebecca Nakisita Bayole. Mutesi was announced as the Inhebantu of Busoga on the 7th September 2023 at the Busoga headquarters in Bugembe by Joseph Muvawala the current Katukiro of Busoga kingdom

== See also ==
- William Gabula
- Basoga
- Queen Sylvia of Buganda
- Busoga Royal Weddings
- Wilberforce Gabula Nadiope IV
- Busoga Kingdom
