= Pamela Mbabazi =

Ugandan professor and academic administrator

- Born: 6 April 1969 (age 57); Mbarara, Uganda
- Citizenship: Uganda
- Education: Makerere University (Bachelor of Arts in economics & political science); University of Leeds (Master of Arts in development studies); Kwame Nkrumah University of Science and Technology (Master of Science in development planning and management); Mbarara University (Doctor of Philosophy in development studies)
- Occupations: Academic, and academic administrator
- Years active: 1990 — present
- Known for: Academic administration
- Title: Chairperson; National Planning Authority of Uganda
- Spouse: Ivan Mbabazi Batuma

Pamela Kasabiiti Mbabazi (née Pamela Kasabiiti on 6 April 1969) is a Ugandan university professor, academic, and academic administrator, who currently serves as the Chairperson of the National Planning Authority of Uganda (NPA). She was installed in that position in April 2019, to serve a five-year term, renewable one time. Her Chairperson role was renewed in 2024 to serve for another 5 years as NPA Chairperson.

She previously served as the deputy vice-chancellor of Mbarara University of Science and Technology (MUST). She was appointed to that position in 2010, for a renewable five-year term.

== Background and education ==
Mbabazi was born Pamela Kasabiiti in Mbarara, Uganda, on 6 April 1969. She attended elementary schools in the Mbarara metropolitan area, before transferring to Kigezi High School for her O-Level studies. She moved to Bweranyangi Girls' Senior Secondary School in Bushenyi for her A-Level education.

In 1987, she entered Makerere University, Uganda's oldest and largest institution of higher education, graduating in 1990 with a Bachelor of Arts in economics and political science. She continued with her education at the University of Leeds, where she earned a Master of Arts in development studies in 1992. She earned a Master of Science in development planning and management from the Kwame Nkrumah University of Science and Technology in Kumasi, Ghana. Her doctorate degree in development studies was obtained in 2005 from MUST.

== Work experience ==
Since 1998, Mbabazi has served as the dean of the Faculty of Development Studies at Mbarara University. She is credited for setting up the faculty and developing curricula for the degree courses in development studies and business administration. The faculty has now been amalgamated into the university's Institute of Management Science. In 2010, she was appointed as deputy vice chancellor at MUST, replacing Jonathan Baranga who returned to the Faculty of Science. In April 2019, she was sworn in as the new Chairperson of the National Planning Authority of Uganda, replacing Prof. Wilberforce Kisamba Mugerwa, who served in that role from 2008 until 2018.

== Personal life ==
Mbabazi is married to Ivan Mbabazi Batuma. Together, they are the parents of two children.

== See also ==
- Alice Nabatanzi
- Maud Kamatenesi Mugisha
- Patrick Ogwang
- Peter Kyobe Waiswa
- List of universities in Uganda
- List of university leaders in Uganda

== Succession table as deputy vice chancellor of Mbarara University ==
Preceded by Jonathan Baranga; 2005 - 2010	Deputy Vice Chancellor of Mbarara University; 2010 - present	Succeeded by Incumbent
