= Katukiro of Busoga =

Prime minister of the Kingdom of Busoga, Uganda

- Coat of arms of Busoga

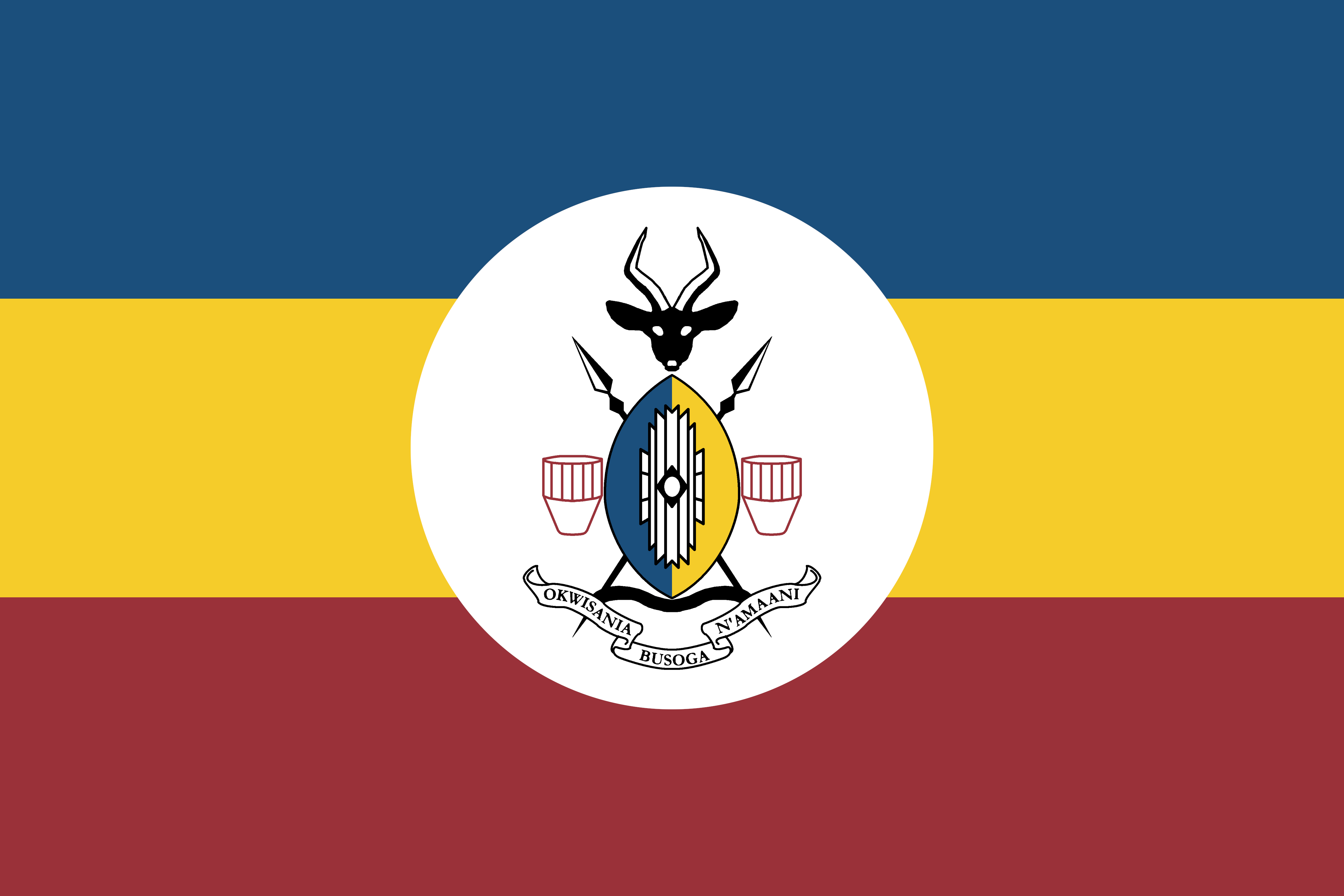
- Flag of Busoga
- Incumbent; Joseph Muvawala Nsekere since 18 April 2016
- Style: The Right Honourable
- Appointer: The Kyabazinga
- Term length: At the Kyabazinga's pleasure
- Precursor: General Secretary
- Inaugural holder: William Balwa Mwangu
- Formation: 1962; abolished 1967; restored 1995

The Katukiro is the prime minister of the Kingdom of Busoga, one of the traditional kingdoms of Uganda. The Katukiro is appointed by and subordinate to the Busoga monarch, the Kyabazinga. As head of government, the Katukiro is an ex officio member of the Lukiiko, Busoga's parliament.

The office was created in 1962 as a direct parallel to that of Katikkiro in the neighbouring Kingdom of Buganda, replacing the earlier post of General Secretary of Busoga, which had existed before independence. It lapsed in 1967 when President Milton Obote abolished Uganda's traditional kingdoms, and was restored after the kingdom itself was reinstated and Henry Wako Muloki returned as Kyabazinga on 11 February 1995.

The current Katukiro is Joseph Muvawala Nsekere, appointed on 18 April 2016.
