= Macwa of Nkore =

Omugabe of Nkore

- Omugabe of Nkore
- Reign: 1727–1755
- Predecessor: Ntare IV of Nkore
- Successor: Rwabirere, Karara I, Karaiga, Kahaya I (joint rule)
- Born: Unknown
- Died: 1755
- Burial: Nkore (exact location unknown)
- Father: Unknown
- Mother: Unknown
- Religion: Traditional African religion

Macwa of Nkore was the Omugabe (king) of Nkore, a traditional Bantu Kingdom in present-day southwestern Uganda. He reigned from 1727 to 1755. He succeeded Ntare IV of Nkore ( Ntare IV Kitabanyoro) upon the latter's death.

He belonged to the Bahinda clan, the royal lineage of Nkore that claimed descent from Ruhinda, the kingdom's founder. He ruled during a period of consolidation for the kingdom before later periods of expansion.

== Death ==
Macwa died in 1755, marking the end of a reign that lasted approximately 28 years. Contemporary records describing the circumstances or the cause of his death have not survived, and later historical traditions don't provide definitive account. Following his death, the succession to the throne was contested, with Rwabirere Karara I, Karaiga, and Kahaya I associated with the subsequent transition of Power in Nkore.

== See also ==
- Chwa I of Buganda
- Daudi Cwa II of Buganda
- Duhaga of Bunyoro
- Ezekiel Tenywa Wako of Busoga
- William Gabula
- Solomon Iguru I

Regnal titles
Preceded by Ntare IV	Omugabe of Nkore; 1727–1755	Succeeded by Rwabirere; Karara I Karaiga; Kahaya I (joint rule)
