= Duhaga of Bunyoro =

Omukama of Bunyoro from c.1731- c.1782

Omukama of Bunyoro
- Predecessor: Olimi III
- Successor: Olimi IV
- Born: c. 1731; Bunyoro-Kitara, Uganda
- Died: 1782 (aged 50–51); Africa
- Burial: Africa

Duhaga of Bunyoro was Omukama of Bunyoro (c. 1731-c.1782). Omukama of Bunyoro is the name given to rulers of the central African kingdom of Bunyoro-Kitara.

Duhaga was preceded by Olimi III - (c. 1710–1731) and later succeeded by Olimi IV - (c. 1782–1786).

== Background ==
Omukama Bisereko Duhaga, son of Omukama Cwa II Kabalega, reigned from September 17, 1902, until his death on March 30, 1924. He succeeded his brother Yosia Kitahimbwa, who had been installed by the British in 1898 after Kabalega of Bunyoro was driven out of Bunyoro at the peak of his decade-long rebellion.

Duhaga was nominated a suitable candidate for Kingship by Anglican Missionary Albert Lloyd reflecting the remarkable influence the Church Missionary Society had over Political appointment.

After his death Omukama Duhaga was buried at his father’s land in Kinogozi village, Buhimba Sub County in Hoima district. Kinogozi is about five kilometres from the Mparo Royal Tombs, where Kabalega and other Bunyoro royals were buried.

Alongside Duhaga’s tomb are others for his daughters and relatives. Canon Kahuma says the tombs and their surroundings will be beautified to glorify the mighty Bunyoro Kitara kingdom. The Canon says the budget has already been drawn and the diocese is putting together funds for the work. Kahuma meanwhile declined to give details saying he was not in office at the time Uganda Radio Network contacted him.

Bunyoro Kitara Diocese took over the management of the site in 1993 following the death of Princess Alexandria Komukyeya, Duhaga’s daughter. Komukyeya, the only surviving child of Duhaga then, gave all her father’s property to the Diocese.

From then a Diocese has hired a caretaker of a grave yard.

== See also ==
- Bunyoro
- Banyoro
- western Region, Uganda
- Kabalega
- Bunyoro-Kitara Kingdom
- Mparo Royal Tombs
- History of Uganda
