= Joseph Muvawala Nsekere =

Katukiro of Busoga
- Incumbent
- Assumed office 18 April 2016

Executive Director of the National Planning Authority (NPA)

Personal details
- Born: Joseph Muvawala Nsekere
- Education: Makerere University; Harvard University
- Occupation: Economist
- Profession: Economist
- Known for: Executive Director, National Planning Authority (NPA); Prime Minister (Katukiro) of the Busoga Kingdom

Joseph Muvawala Nsekere, also known as Joseph Muvawala, is a Ugandan economist, public servant and traditional leader. He is the Executive Director of the National Planning Authority (NPA) of Uganda and Prime Minister (Katukiro) of the Busoga Kingdom.

== Educational background ==
Joseph Muvawala has a BA in Economics and Social Administration and an MA in Economic Policy and Planning from Makerere University; a 2006 Certificate in Public Sector Budget Management from Harvard University (US) and a 2010 PhD in Economics from Makerere University.

== Career ==
Joseph Muvawala worked in the Ministry of Transport as a transport economist before working as a macro-economist in the Ministry of Local Government under the Uganda Transport Rehabilitation Project. He also worked as an immigration officer under the Immigration Department in Ministry of Internal Affairs and as a principal economist in Iganga District.

He joined Ministry of Education and Sports as a principal economist, where he was later promoted to assistant commissioner in charge of Budget & Development Planning. Joseph Muvawala also worked as the principal education economist with the African Development Bank (AfDB) in Tunisia, before moving to South Sudan as a chief country economist.

Joseph Muvawala served as the chairperson of the Directorate of Industrial Training (DIT), deputy chairperson of the Education Policy Review Commission (EPRC) and Board Member of Uganda National Roads Authority (UNRA).

Joseph Muvawala is executive director of the National Planning Authority (NPA) and Prime Minister (Katukiro) of the Busoga Kingdom.
