= Mparo =

Mparo may refer to one of the following:

- Mparo, Rukiga, a town, the headquarters of Rikiga District, Western Region, Uganda
- Mparo, Hoima, a village, the location of the Bunyoro Kingdom royal tombs.
