= Ntare IV =

Ntare IV may refer to:

- Ntare IV of Burundi, Ntare IV Rutaganzwa Rugamba, king of Burundi (1796–1850)
- Ntare IV of Nkore, king of Nkore in Uganda (1699–1727)
