= Igenge Palace =

Coordinates: 0.4831°N 33.2323°E

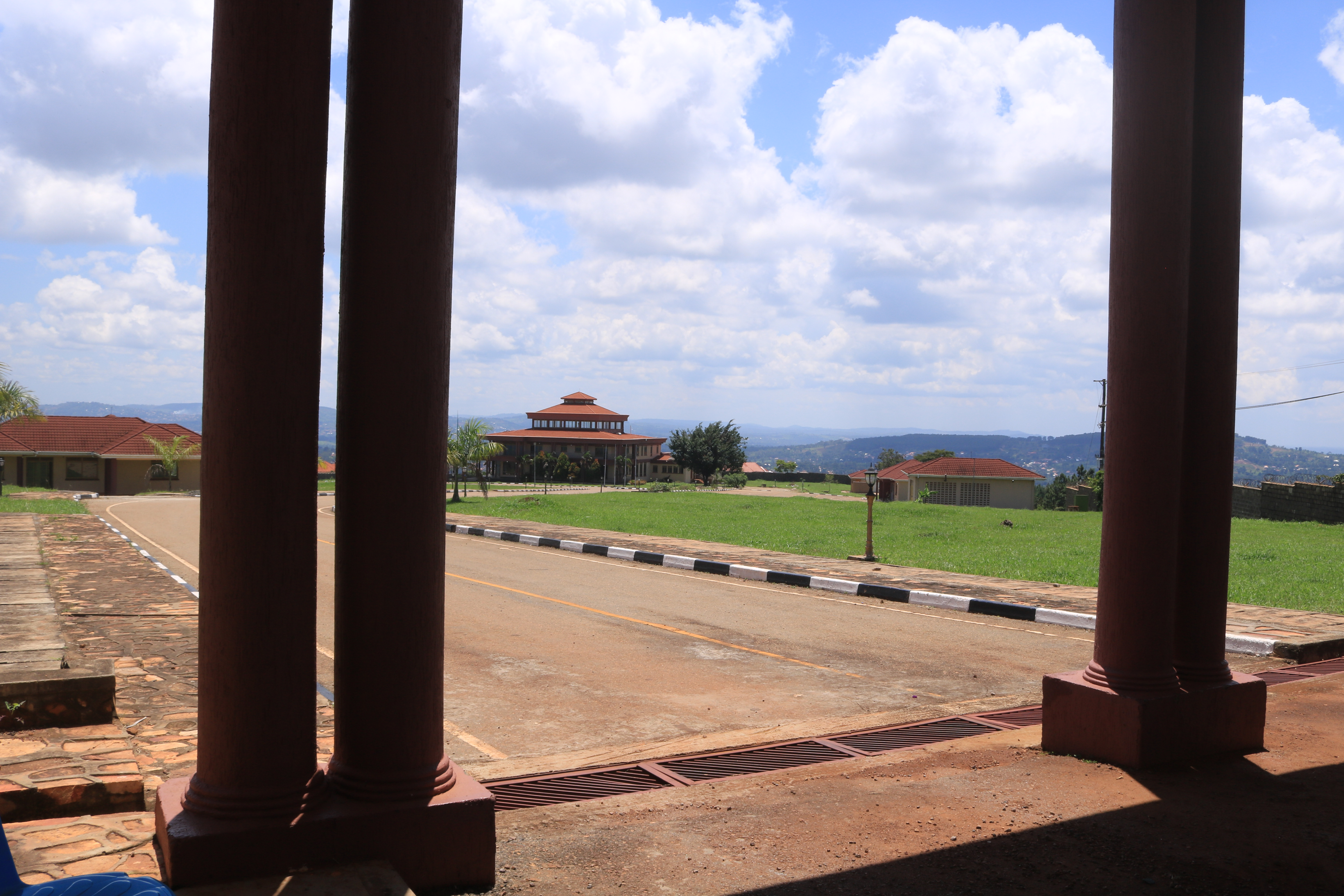
- Kyabazinga's Palace
- Interactive map of the Igenge Palace area

General information
- Location: Jinja City, Bugema Town Council, Wayange hill, Uganda
- Year built: 1963
- Opened: 2022-02-11
- Renovated: 2006 January 16
- Owner: Kyabazinga of Busoga

Technical details
- Floor count: 2

Design and construction
- Main contractor: Mugoya International

Other information
- Number of rooms: 40
- Facilities: Offices, Kitchen, Library

Igenge Palace also known as Igenge Hill Palace is the official royal residence for the Kyabazinga of Busoga Kingdom in present-day Uganda.

== Location ==
located on Igenge hills in Wayange parish, Bugembe Town Council, Jinja City North division.

== Background ==
Igenge palace was constructed in 1963 and Kyabazinga Wilberforce Nadiope was the first occupant.

In mid 1970s, Idi Amin soldiers ransacked the palace and it was turned into military quarters after people abandoning it

== Renovation of the palace ==
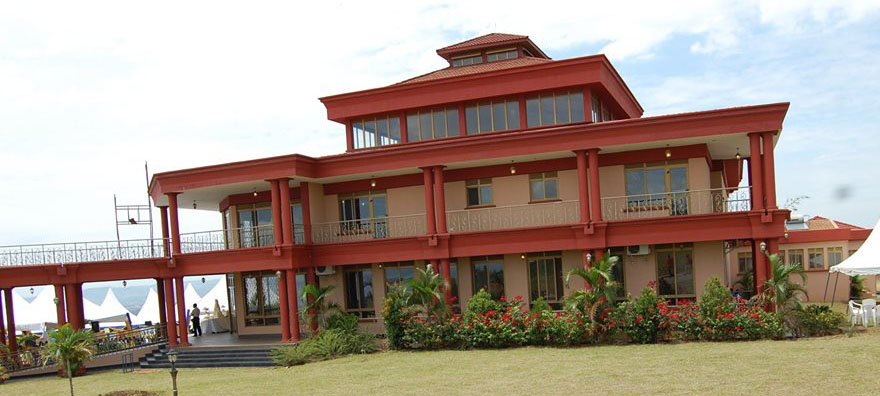
Igenge Palace.jpg

The renovation of Igenge Palace was done by the government of Uganda through the Ministry of Gender, Labour and Social Development and the Ministry of Works, and Transport.

In 2006-01-16, the Igenge palace renovation commenced using funding from the government of Uganda. The renovation works were done by Mugoya International who gave the palace a new look with a parameter wall constructed around the expansive palace

The palace is a double-storey complex with a floor laid with marble tiles. It contains around 40 rooms, offices, sitting rooms, a kitchen and bathrooms.

== Official occupation ==
On 2022 February 11, the Kyabazinga of Busoga Kingdom, William Wilberforce Gabula Nadiope IV officially started occupying Igenge palace after 6 years of not occupying it due to the renovations funded by the government of Uganda, the renovation costed UGX 12 billion.

The official occupation of Igenge palace was done on the grand 83rd-anniversary celebrations Kyabazinga Day.

The grand celebration of handing over the renovated palace was presided over by Jessica Alupo.

== See also ==
- William Wiberforce Gabula Nadiope IV
- Lubiri
- Twekobe
