= Kyebambe IV of Tooro =

King of Tooro from 1891 to 1928

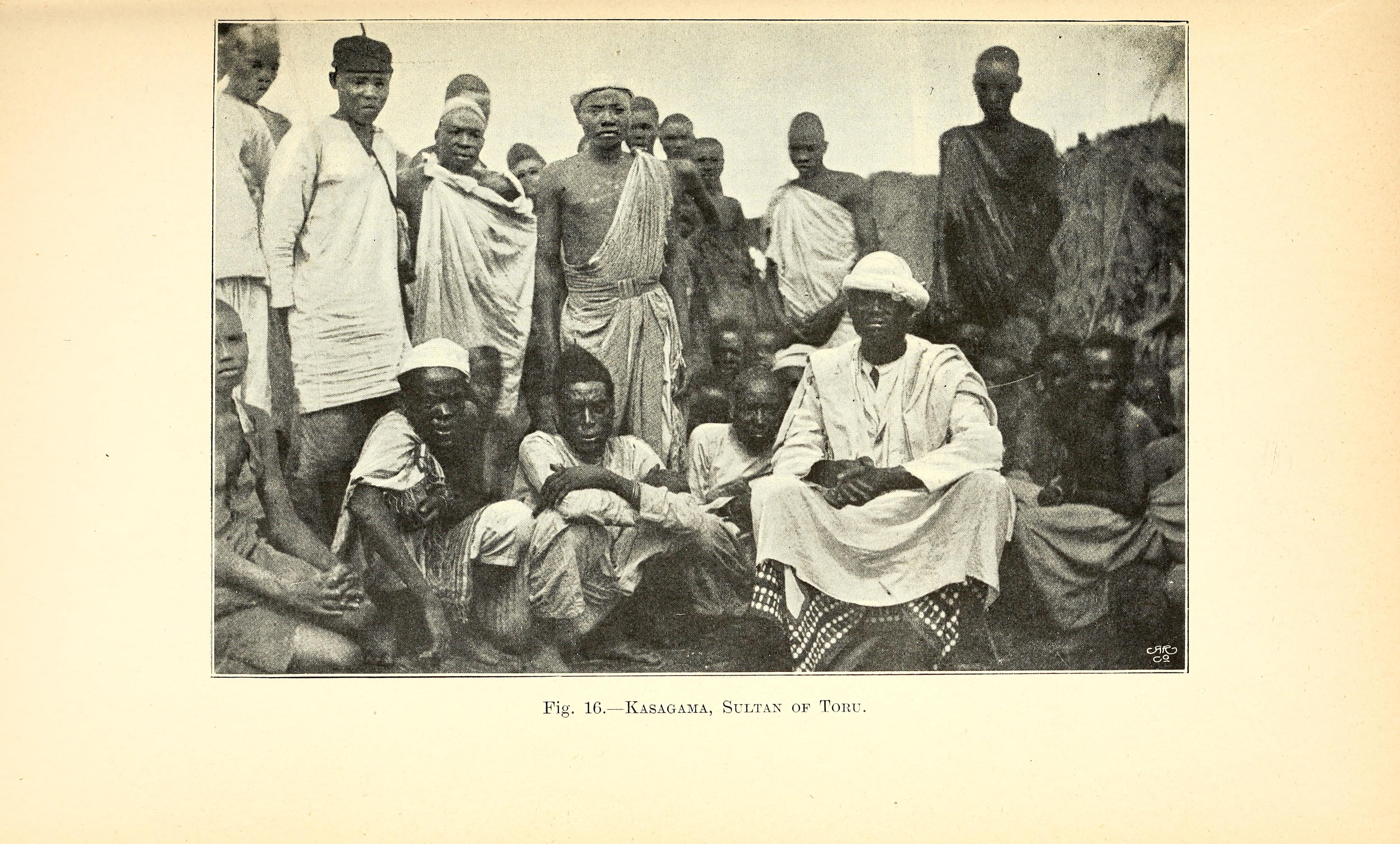

Omukama of Tooro
- Reign: 1891–1928
- Predecessor: Interregnum
- Successor: Rukidi III
- Born: c. 1874
- Died: 1928

Omukama Daudi Kasagama Kyebambe IV (c. 1874 - 1928) was the 10th Omukama of Tooro from 1891 to his death in 1928. He came to power in 1891 until his death in 1928. He is often remembered as the "defender of modern Toro". He was succeeded by Rukidi III.

== Background ==
As an infant, Kyebambe IV was forced into exile in Ankole and then Buganda due to invasions by the Bunyoro Kingdom. He later met the British colonial agent Captain Frederick Lugard in Buganda and secured his support to regain the throne of Toro. Lugard helped him defeat the Bunyoro forces and re-establish the Tooro Kingdom in 1891. He signed a treaty with the Imperial British East Africa Company (IBEAC) and which was formally installed as Omukama by Lord Lugard in August 1891. Kyebambe played a crucial role in introducing Christianity to the region. Kyebambe converted to the Anglican faith, was baptized Daudi (David) in May 1896, and invited Christian missionaries into his kingdom, with his enclosure becoming a center for Christian teaching.

== See also ==
- Kyebambe IV of Bunyoro
- Kingdom of Tooro
- Kingdom of Bunyoro

Preceded by Interregnum	Omukama of Tooro; 1891-1928	Succeeded by Rukidi III
