= Kyebambe IV of Bunyoro =

Omukama of Bunyoro

- Omukama of Bunyoro

Omukama of Bunyoro
- Reign: 1852–1869
- Predecessor: Olimi V
- Successor: Kabalega
- Born: c. 1822
- Died: 1869

Omukama Kamurasi Kyebambi IV (c. 1822–1869) was the 22nd Omukama of Bunyoro from 1852 to his death in 1869. His predecessor was nyamutukura Kyebambe III and the successor Kabalega.

Preceded by Olimi V	Omukama of Bunyoro; 1859–1869	Succeeded by Kaberega

== See also ==
- Kyebambe IV of Tooro
- Kingdom of Tooro
- Kingdom of Bunyoro
