= Jovia Mutesi =

Fifth Inhebantu of Busoga

- Inhebantu of Busoga
- Born: St. Matiya Mulumba village Mayuge District
- Spouse: Nadiope IV of Busoga
- Father: Stanley Bayole
- Religion: Anglican

Jovia Mutesi (born 21 September 1997) is the fifth Inhebantu of Busoga since 2023.

== Early life and education ==
Mutesi is the first born and daughter of Stanley Bayole and Rebecca Nakisita Bayole. Her father is the Bulambuli Resident District Commissioner, Local Council One (LC1) chairperson of St. Matia Mulumba. He also served as an LC3 chairperson of Mayuge Town Council. She belongs to the Baise - Mugosa clan, whose totem is an Egret.

Mutesi received a Degree in Bachelor of science in accounting and finance at Nkozi University].

== Marriage ==
Jovia Mutesi was announced as the Inhebantu of Busoga on the 7 September 2023 at the Busoga headquarters in Bugembe by Joseph Muvawala.

She married William Gabula Nadiope IV on November 18, 2023 at Christ's Church Cathedral in JinJa City. Their wedding reception was at Igenge Palace in Jinja on November 18, 2023. Afterwards, William Gabula visited Mutesi's parents in her ancestral home in Mayuge district on a private traditional ceremony. On August 27, 2025 Mutesi and husband Gabula welcomed a set of twins. Just over a year after the firstborn twins, the royal family welcomed their third son on November 18 2026.

== See also ==
- Inhebantu of Busoga
- William Gabula
- Basoga
- Queen Sylvia of Buganda
- Queen Best Kemigisa
- Busoga Royal Weddings
