= Mparo Royal Tombs =

Royal Burial Site for Bunyoro-Kitara Kingdom

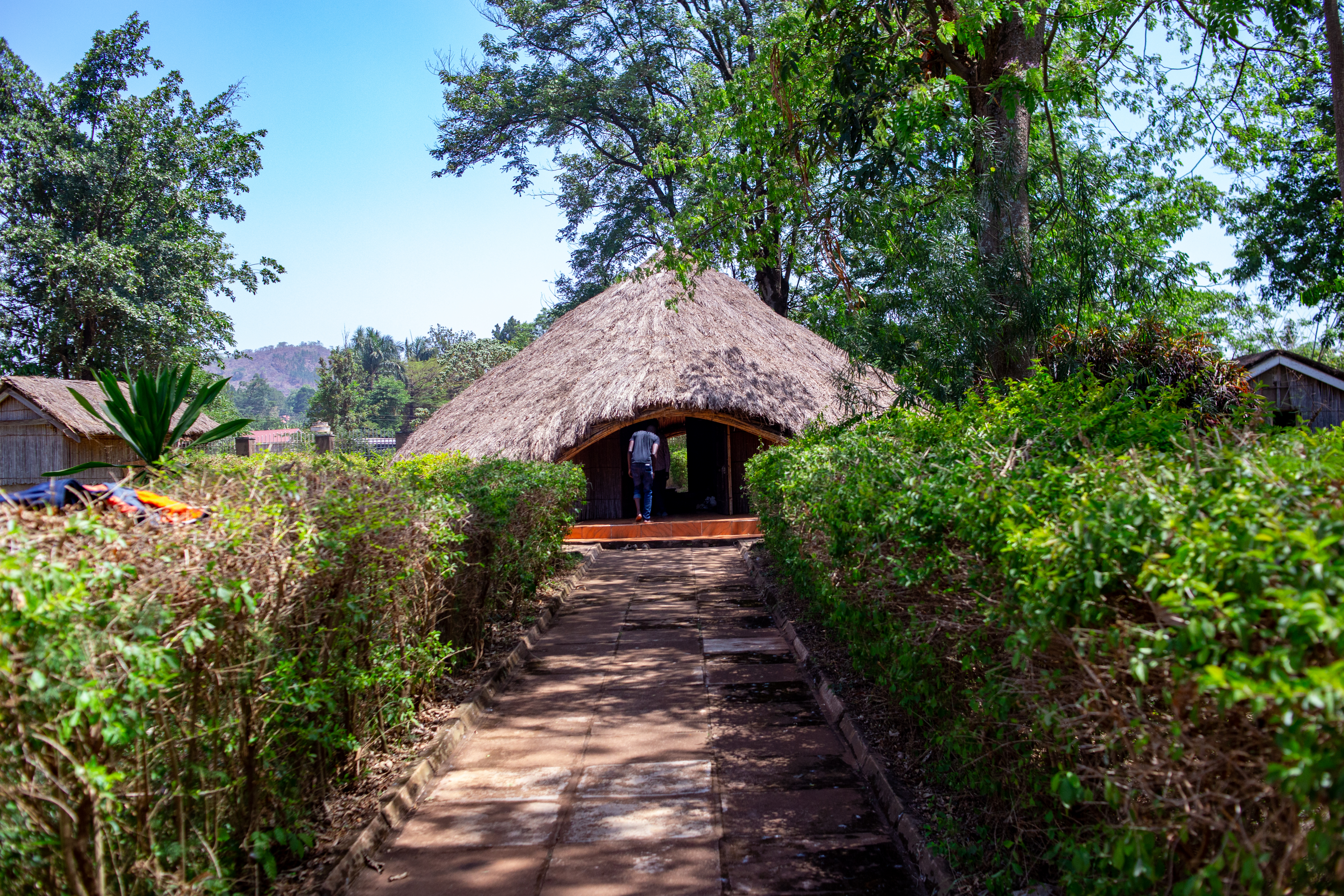
Mparo Royal tombs

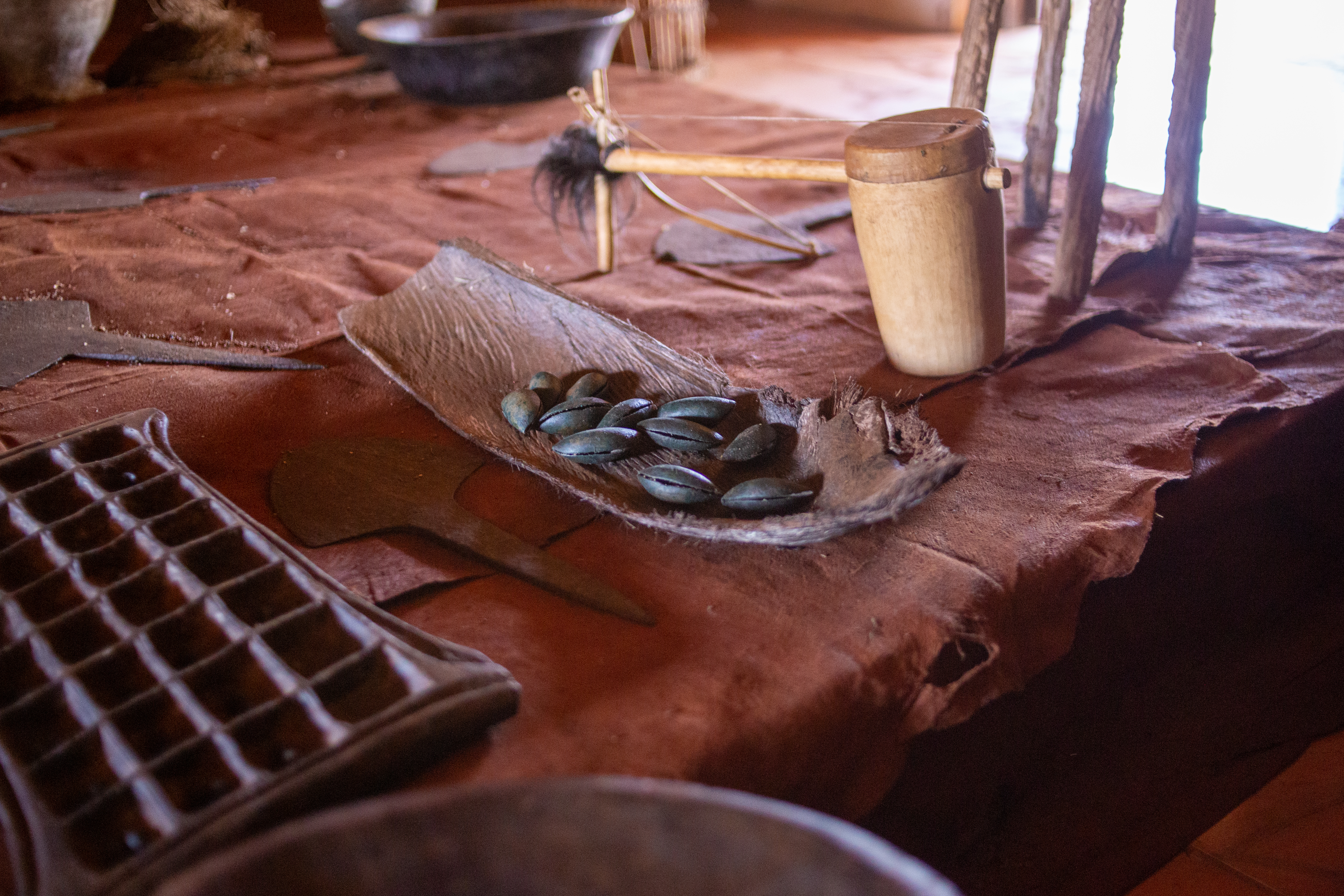
Mparo royal tombs remains of the tools the King used

Mparo Royal Tombs also Mparo tombs is a historical royal burial site for Omukama Kabalega II and kings and royals of Bunyoro-Kitara kingdom. The tombs cover six acres of land.

== Location ==
Hoima district in Western Uganda where Mparo Tombs are located

Mparo royal tombs is located along the Hoima-Masindi highway in Mparo village, Mparo division approximately 4kmnortheastst of Hoima town in Hoima district, Western Uganda.

== Structure ==
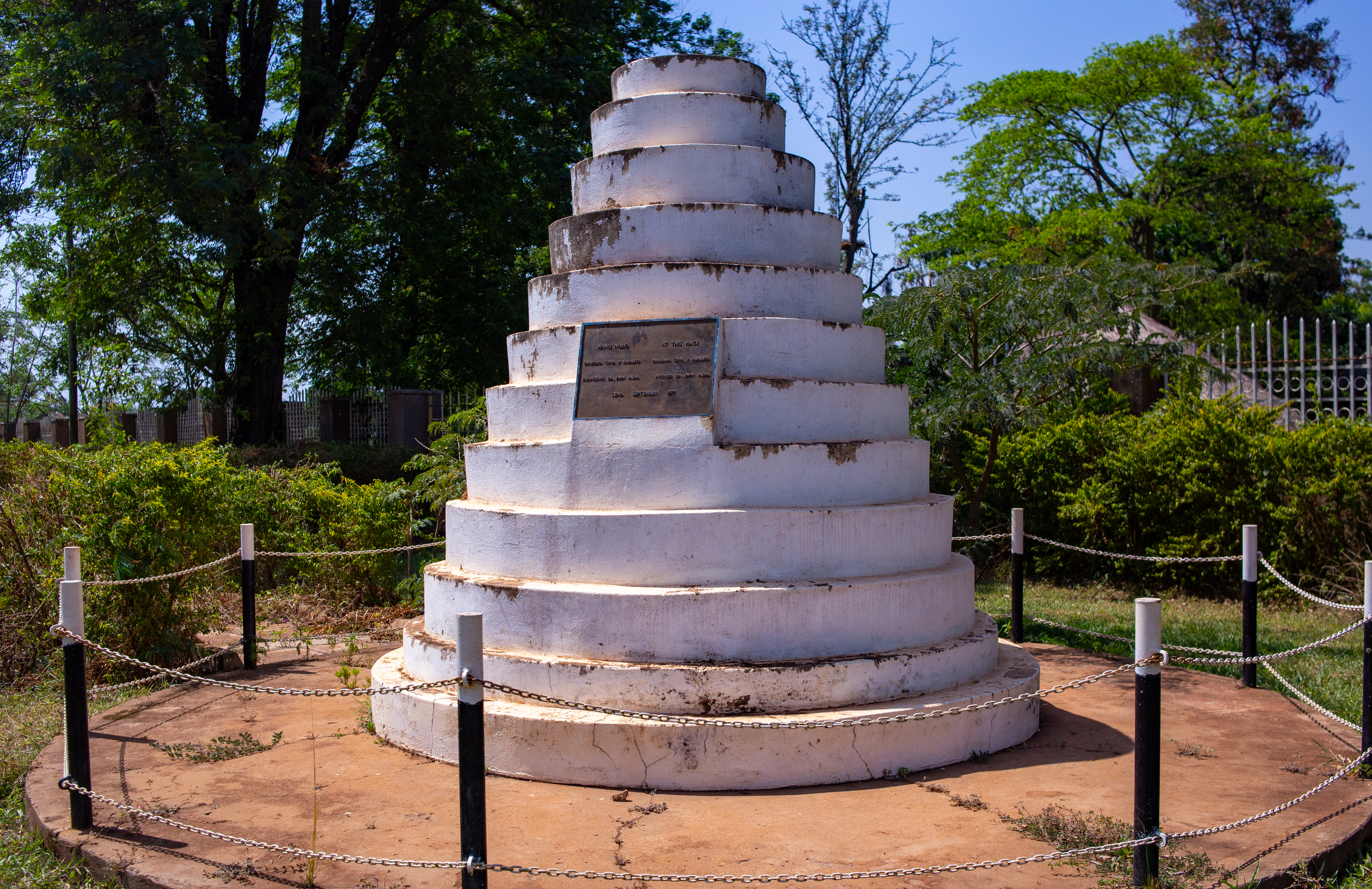
The Mparo Royal Tomb monument

In Front of the tombs is a white and black painted cone-shaped monument built when Sir Emin Pasha met Kabalega in 1871 for the first time to tell him accept British rule. It is made of 12 steps upward.

The Mparo royal tombs is a round-grass thatched huts with reeds having wooden doors guarded by royal guards.

Bunyoro-Kitara kingdom has various royal sites each occupying eight square mile of land. Some of the tombs found in these sites include the Kabalega tomb, Tito Winyi tomb who was the father of Omukama Solomon Gafabusa and others.

== Historical significance ==
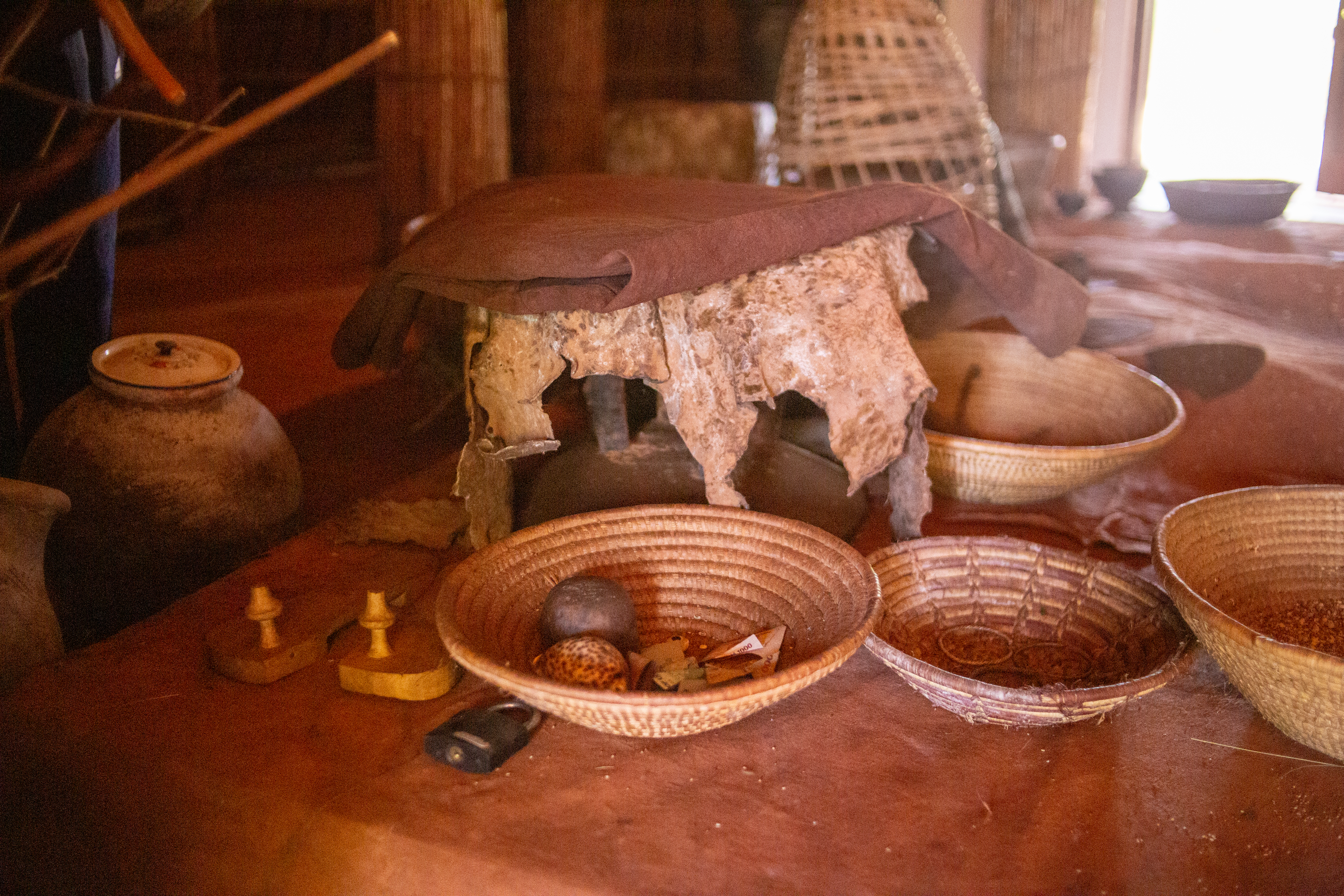
Remains found inside the Mparo Royal Tombs

The Mparo royal tombs are burial grounds for various royal figures in the Bunyoro-Kitara kingdom. The tombs houses the remains of Omukama Chwa II Kabalega who ruled Bunyoro kingdom in the 19th century. Omukama Kabalega II was exiled to Seychelles in April 1899 by British Empire for resisting colonial rules.

The Mparo royal tombs is also the final resting place for the remains of Sir Tito Winyi, father to the Omukama Solomon Gafabusa Iguru I, current Omukama. It's also burial grounds for the princess, princesses and other royals of Bunyoro-Kitara Kingdom.

== Cultural significance ==
The remains of Kabalega are kept in a traditional mausoleum covered with bark cloth. Each tomb at Mparo royal tombs is covered with a bark-cloth next to the royal regalia and other cultural belongings of the respective kings which he used during his regime.

The Mparo royal tombs are tourist attractions having ancients instruments such as smoking pipes, clay pots, milk and water containers, baskets, wooden bowls, sticks, drums, spears, shields, wooden stools and coffee berries.

People visit the Mparo royal tombs to perform cultural rituals and also to pay homage to the former kings and pray for inspiration, and blessings from the spirits Omukama Kabalega and other kings.

The tombs also houses the bronze and iron spears got from the Chwezi and Babito dynasties, the cone-shaped crowns, flutes and necklaces used by the rulers of chwezi dynasty.

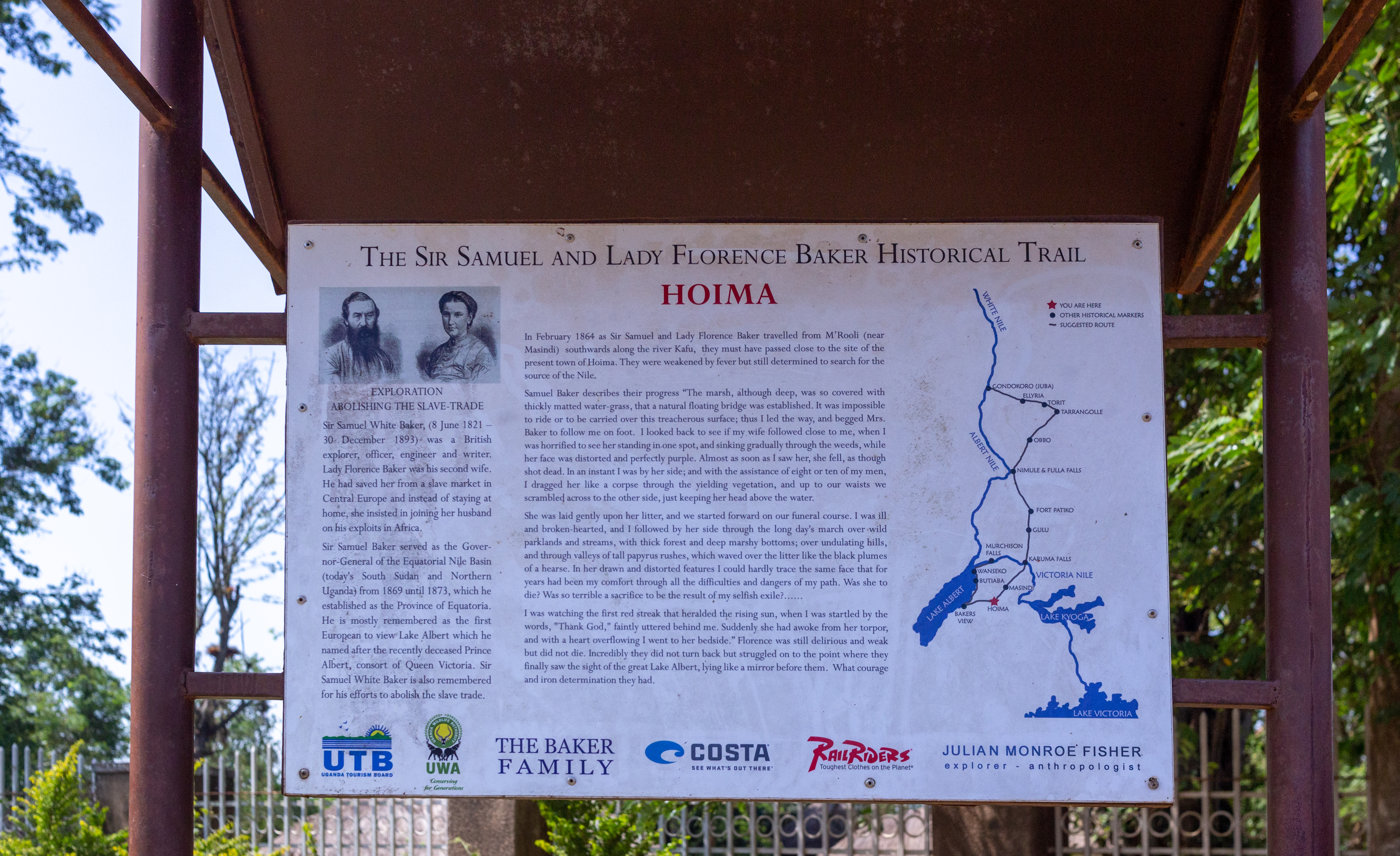
Mparo Royal Tombs Historical write up

== Taboo ==
People visiting the tombs are not allowed to enter with shoes, he or she should not have engaged in extramarital affairs the night prior visiting. Girls/women who are undergoing menstruations periods are not allowed to enter. Also for one to step into the tombs, your required to confess his/her sins.

== Rehabilitation ==
in 2009, the tombs were rehabilitated by Uganda People's Defense Force (UPDF) in preparation for the Heroes day celebration in June 2009 which were hosted by the Bunyoro kingdom. The soldiers renovated the traditional huts and tombs inside the Bunyoro empire and also constructed the perimeter wall replacing the reed fence with a perimeter wall of concrete and bricks.

== See also ==
- Mparo
- Omukama Kabalega
- Bunyoro-Kitara kingdom
- Kyakapeya
