= Ezekiel Tenywa Wako of Busoga =

First Kyabazinga of Busoga

Ezekiel Tenywa Wako
- Isebantu Kyabazinga

Kyabazinga of Busoga and Zibondo of Bulamogi
- Reign: 11 February 1939 - 1949
- Coronation: 11 February 1939
- Successor: William Wilberforce Nadiope II
- Spouse: Yunia Nakibande
- Father: Prince Mukama Namutukula

Ezekiel Tenywa Wako, the Zibondo of Bulamogi was the first Kyabazinga of Busoga, a constitutional kingdom in modern-day Uganda. He ascended to the throne on February 11, 1939 and led until 1949 when he retired.

== Education ==
Ezekiel Tenywa Wako studied from King's College, Budo.

== Rise to the throne ==
Wako was born to Prince Mukama Namutukula, his father and Naudo his mother as their first born. He was first elected as the first president of the Busoga Lukiiko in 1919 after a decision by the chiefs to elect one among themselves to rule over the region.

He was elected as the first Isebantu Kyabazinga in 1939.

== Career ==
Wako became a member of Uganda Kings Council in 1925.

== Personal life ==
He was married to Yunia Nakibande and had children one of whom was their first born, Henry Wako Muloki born in 1921

== See also ==
- Busoga sub-region
- Basoga
- Lusoga
- William Gabula
- Kyabazinga of Busoga
