= Lukiiko (Busoga) =

Parliament of Busoga kingdom

Lukiiko of Busoga
- Coat of arms of Busoga

Type
- Type: Unicameral

Leadership
- Speaker: George Mutyabule

Structure
- Seats: 141
- Political groups: His Majesty's Government (36): Katukiro and Ministers (33); Kyabazinga's representatives (3); Territorial representatives (95): Elected members (64); Clan representatives (20); Hereditary Chiefs (11); Social representatives (9): Civil society (9); Presiding Officer: Speaker (1)

Elections
- Voting system: Election, heredity and Appointment by the Kyabazinga

Meeting place
- Bugembe, Uganda

The Lukiiko is the Parliament of the Kingdom of Busoga.

The Lukiiko arose out of British efforts to govern Busoga, which had previously been highly decentralised. The first Lukiiko met at Bukaleba in 1894. Prince Kisira, the Zibondo of Bulamogi was elected chairman of the first Busoga Council by the eleven hereditary chiefs. He presided over the council until his death in 1898. The role of the Lukiiko was then formalised during the formation of the confederacy of Busoga in July 1906.

The Lukiiko consists of a mixed membership representing various interests in Busoga. The Katukiro of Busoga along with the other members of the kingdom's cabinet of ministers are ex-officio members. The Kyabazinga is charged with appointing 3 representatives. The largest bloc of members represent the 11 principalities within Busoga, with each principality having 5 representatives, except Bugabula which has 10, and Butembe and Bukooli which have 7 each. In addition, the 11 hereditary chiefs of the principalities each are entitled to sit in the Lukiiko, or nominate a representative. Each of Busoga's 20 clans has 1 representative. A further 9 representatives are appointed to represent various interest groups and civil society in the kingdom.

== See also ==
- Kyabazinga of Busoga
