= Alice Muloki =

Inhebantu of Busoga
- Tenure: January 21, 1956 – November 6, 2005
- Born: November 19, 1929
- Died: November 6, 2005 (aged 75)
- Burial: Kaliro District, Uganda
- Spouse: Henry Wako Muloki
- Issue: 8

Alice Muloki (19 November 1929 – 6 November 2005) was the Inhebantu (queen consort) of Busoga Kingdom in Uganda. She was the spouse of Henry Wako Muloki, the ruler of Busoga Kingdom, who was known as the Kyabazinga of Busoga.

== Background and education ==
Muloki was born Alice Kintu on November 19, 1929. She was educated Berkley High School, Gayaza High School and Buloba College in Busoga. She then trained as a Grade 3 teacher at Buloba Primary Teachers College near Kampala, after which she taught at Buckley High School, before being transferred to work in Kamuli. In 1956, she resigned from working as a principal at Bishop Willis Core Primary Teachers College.

== Personal life ==
Alice Muloki married Kyabazinga Henry Wako Muloki on January 21, 1956. The couple had eight children together- four sons and four daughters.

Muloki was a strong advocate for the Girl Child Education programmes, and various other programmes in Busoga.

Alice Muloki died on November 6, 2005. She was buried in Kaliro District. Her husband, Henry Wako Muloki, was buried with her in Kaliro after his death in 2008.

== See also ==
- Kaliro District
- Henry Wako Muloki
- Busoga Kingdom
