= Mparo, Hoima =

Mparo
- Village
- Location in Uganda
- Coordinates: 01°26′08″N 31°23′56″E
- Country: Uganda
- Region: Western Region
- Sub-region: Bunyoro sub-region
- District: Hoima District
- Time zone: UTC+3 (EAT)

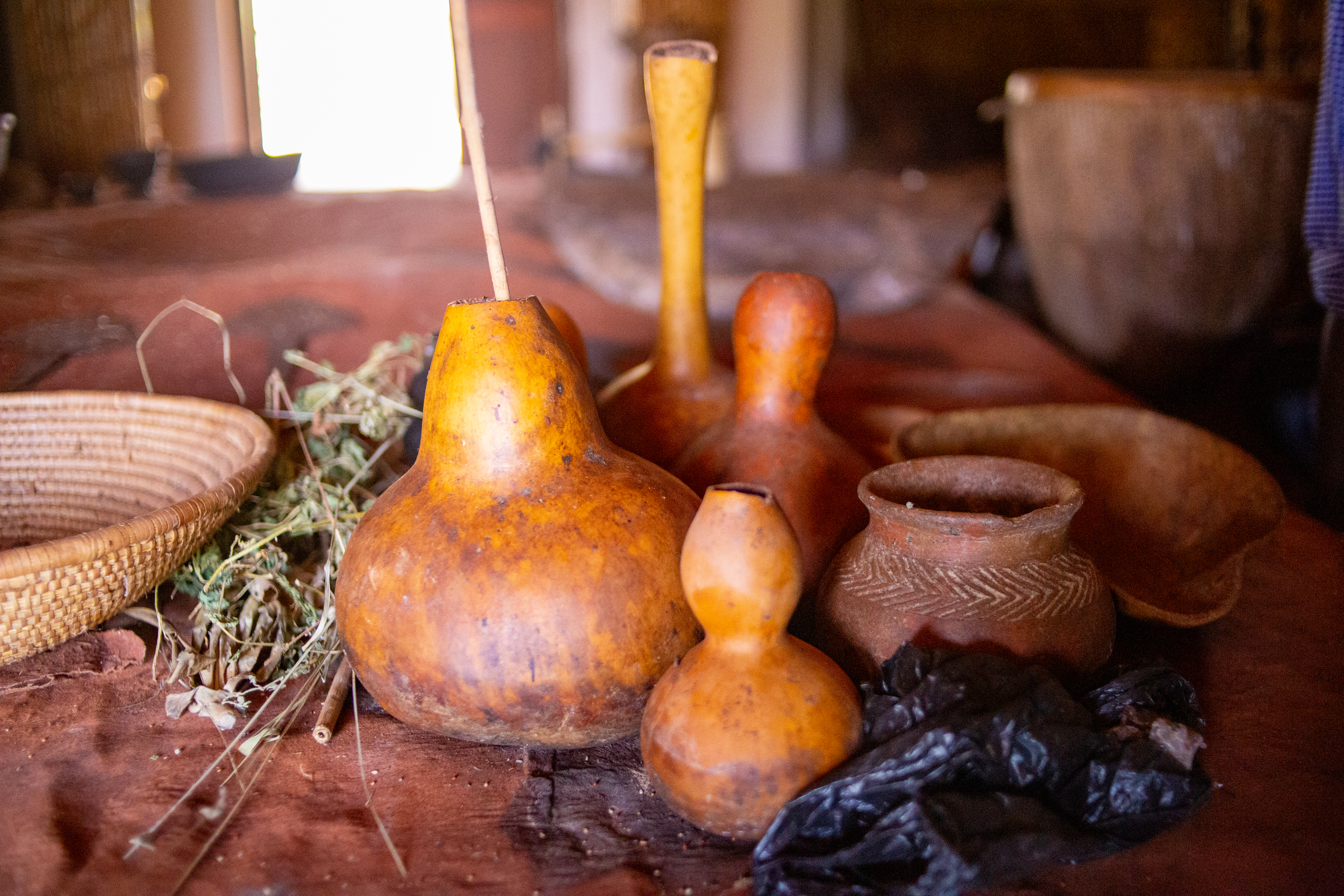
Inside Mparo Royal Tombs are remains of the tools the king used

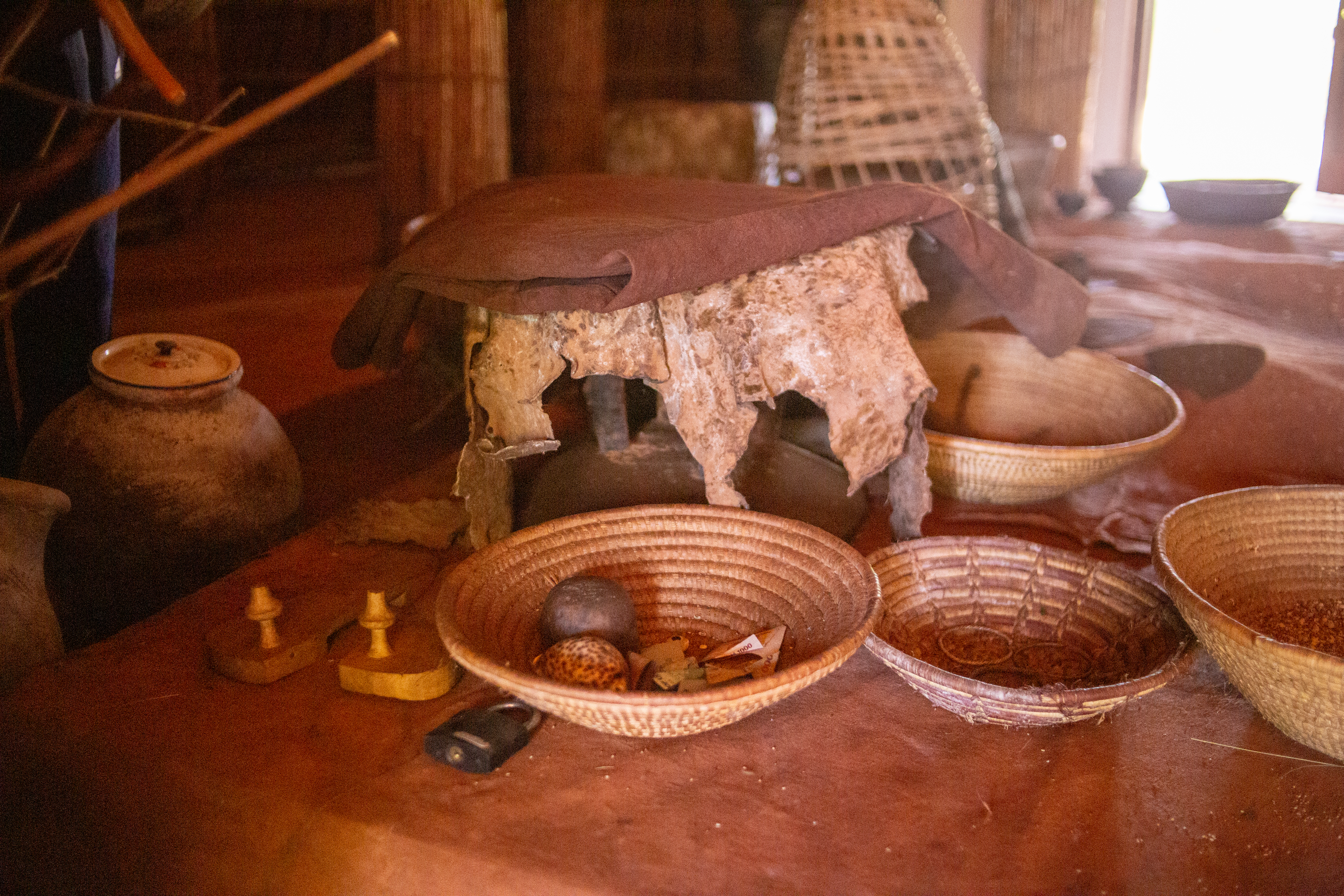
Inside MParo Royal Tombs

Mparo is a Division in Hoima City, in the Western Region of Uganda. It is the location of the "Mparo Tombs", one of the Royal burial sites of the Bunyoro Kingdom.

== Location ==
Mparo is located approximately 4 kilometres (2 mi), by road, northeast of downtown Hoima, along the Hoima-Masindi Road. The coordinates of Mparo, Hoima are:01°26'08.0"N, 31°23'56.0"E (Latitude:1.435556; Longitude:31.398889).

== Overview ==
The Mparo Tombs are a historical cultural site. The royal tombs are the burial site of Omukama (‘King’) Chwa II Kabalega who reigned in Bunyoro Kitara in the late 19th century. He was exiled to the Seychelles in 1899, by the British colonialists. Inside are his spears, bowls, throne and other personal effects on display above the actual place of interment. Also buried at the site is the late Sir Tito Winyi IV, father of the current Omukama, Rukirabasaija Agutamba Solomon Gafabusa Iguru I.

== See also ==
- Mparo, Rukiga
- Kyakapeya
