= Wilberforce Kisamba Mugerwa =

Ugandan economist, politician and academic (1945–2021)

- Born: 5 July 1945; Kikonda, Luweero District, Uganda
- Died: 7 January 2021 (aged 75); Kampala, Uganda
- Education: Makerere University (BS, MS, PhD in Agricultural Economics)
- Occupations: Agricultural economist; politician; academic
- Years active: 1971–2021
- Known for: Community development, fairness
- Title: Chairman of Microfinance Support Center, Uganda

Wilberforce Kisamba Mugerwa, also Wilberforce Kisamba-Mugerwa, (5 July 1945 – 7 January 2021) was a Ugandan agricultural economist, politician and academic, who served as the chairman of the Uganda Microfinance Support Center, a government-owned company established in 2001, that manages micro credit programs in Uganda, funded by the African Development Bank, Islamic Development Bank and the Ugandan government. Immediately prior to his last position, for the ten years between 2008 and 2018, he served as the chairman of the National Planning Authority of Uganda.

== Background and education ==
Mugerwa was born on 5 July 1945, in Bamunanika County, Luwero District, in the Buganda Region of Uganda. He attended Muyembe Tree Nursery School in Bamunanika, followed by Wampeewo Junior Primary School. He then transferred to Mukono Bishop's Senior Secondary School where he completed his O-Level studies. He then completed his A-Level education at Kololo High School in Kololo, Kampala, graduating with a high school diploma.

In 1968 Mugerwa entered what was then called Makerere College, now Makerere University, Uganda's oldest and largest public university. His chosen field of study was agricultural economics. He obtained a Bachelor of Science degree, followed by a Master of Science degree in the subject. Later, he was awarded a Doctor of Philosophy degree in the same subject, also from Makerere.

== Career ==
After his first degree, Mugerwa joined Uganda's civil service system. Starting in 1971, he served as principal agriculture officer for East Mengo, then for the Western Region of Uganda. Later he was promoted to the Principal Agricultural Economist for the entire county.

In 1980, he entered elective Ugandan politics, serving there until his resignation in 2004, when he accepted a job with the International Food Policy Research Institute (IFPRI), as the Director of IFPRI's new division, the International Service for National Agricultural Research (ISNAR), based in Addis Ababa, Ethiopia.

In 2008, he was named the Chairperson of the newly-created National Planning Authority of Uganda, a position he maintained for the next ten years. While there, he was responsible for the formulation of the Uganda Vision 2040 and the two National Development Plans, (NDP I and NDP II).

== Political career ==
In 1980, Mugerwa contested for Member of Parliament, on the Democratic Party (Uganda) political ticket, to represent Luweero South East. He won that contest, despite being shot in the arm at one of his campaign rallies. He served out his term (1980–1985). When the National Resistance Movement took over government in 1986, Kisamba Mugerwa successfully served as the first elected Local Council 5 chairman for Luweero District (1986–1991). He was then elected as Member of Parliament representing Bamunanika County, beginning in 1991.

During the 13-year period from 1991 until 2004, Kisamba Mugerwa served as a member of the Uganda's cabinet, at different levels, including as Minister without Portfolio in the Office of the Prime Minister, Minister of State for Finance and Economic Planning, and as the Minister of Agriculture, Animal Industry, and Fisheries. He resigned to take up an international job outside Uganda in 2004.

== Other considerations ==
Mugerwa was at one time a Senior Research Associate with the Makerere Institute of Social Research, at Makerere University, in Kampala. At the time of his death he was Chancellor of Ndejje University, a private Christian university based in Luweero District; his home district. He owned a commercial mixed agricultural farm (crops and domestic animals) at Kikonda Village, Bamunanika Sub-county, Luweero District, in the Buganda Region of Uganda.

== Death ==
Mugerwa died of complications from COVID-19 at Mulago National Referral Hospital on 7 January 2021, during the COVID-19 pandemic in Uganda.

== See also ==
- Cabinet of Uganda – Ugandan ministry cabinet
- Parliament of Uganda – Unicameral legislature of Uganda
- Luweero Triangle – Historical region in central Uganda associated with the Ugandan Bush War (1981–1986)
