= National Planning Authority of Uganda =

National development planning organisation

Coordinates: 00°19′12″N 32°35′19″E

National Planning Authority
- Type: Parastatal
- Industry: Development planning
- Founded: 2002
- Headquarters: Kampala, Uganda
- Key people: Prof Pamela Mbabazi; Chairperson Joseph Muvawala; Executive Director
- Products: National Development Plans (NDP I, NDP II, NDP III)
- Website: Homepage

The National Planning Authority of Uganda, commonly referred to as the National Planning Authority (NPA), is a semi-autonomous national development planning organisation in Uganda and is owned by the government of Uganda.

== Location ==
The headquarters of NPA are located at Planning House, 15B Clement Hill Road, on Nakasero Hill, in Uganda's capital city of Kampala. The geographical coordinates of the Authority's headquarters are 0°19'12.0"N, 32°35'19.0"E (Latitude:0.320000; Longitude:32.588611).

== Overview ==
The NPA was created by the Ugandan Parliament in 2002. The mission of the NPA is to produce comprehensive economic development plans for the country. NPA is also mandated to coordinate development planning in the entire country, and to advise the executive branch on the best policies and strategies for the development of the country. The agency is charged with the economic evaluation of public projects and programs, in collaboration with civil society and the private sector. It is also responsible for the development of local expertise in development planning nationally, and at district level.

One of the immediate planning goals is Uganda's attainment of middle-income status, with an annual per capita income of US$1,036 or higher. Originally planned for 2020, more realistic evaluation puts that event in the 2025 to 2030 time frame.

== Governance ==
For a period of ten years, Dr Wilberforce Kisamba Mugerwa, an agricultural economist and former cabinet minister in the central government, served as the executive chairman of NPA. He resigned in August 2018. The executive director of the government agency, is Dr Joseph Muvawala.

In June 2024, a new board was appointed, with the following members, who will serve a five-year term; renewable once.

1. [Prof Pamela Kasabiti

Mbabazi ]]: Chairperson of the Board

1. Dr Ivan Lule: Deputy Chairperson
2. Hon Lydia Wanyoto: Member
3. Prof Enos Kiremire: Member
4. Hon Birahwa Mukitale Stephen Adyeeri: Member

== See also ==
- Economy of Uganda
- Direct investment
- Uganda Investment Authority
