= Wilberforce Nadiope =

wilberforce Nadiope
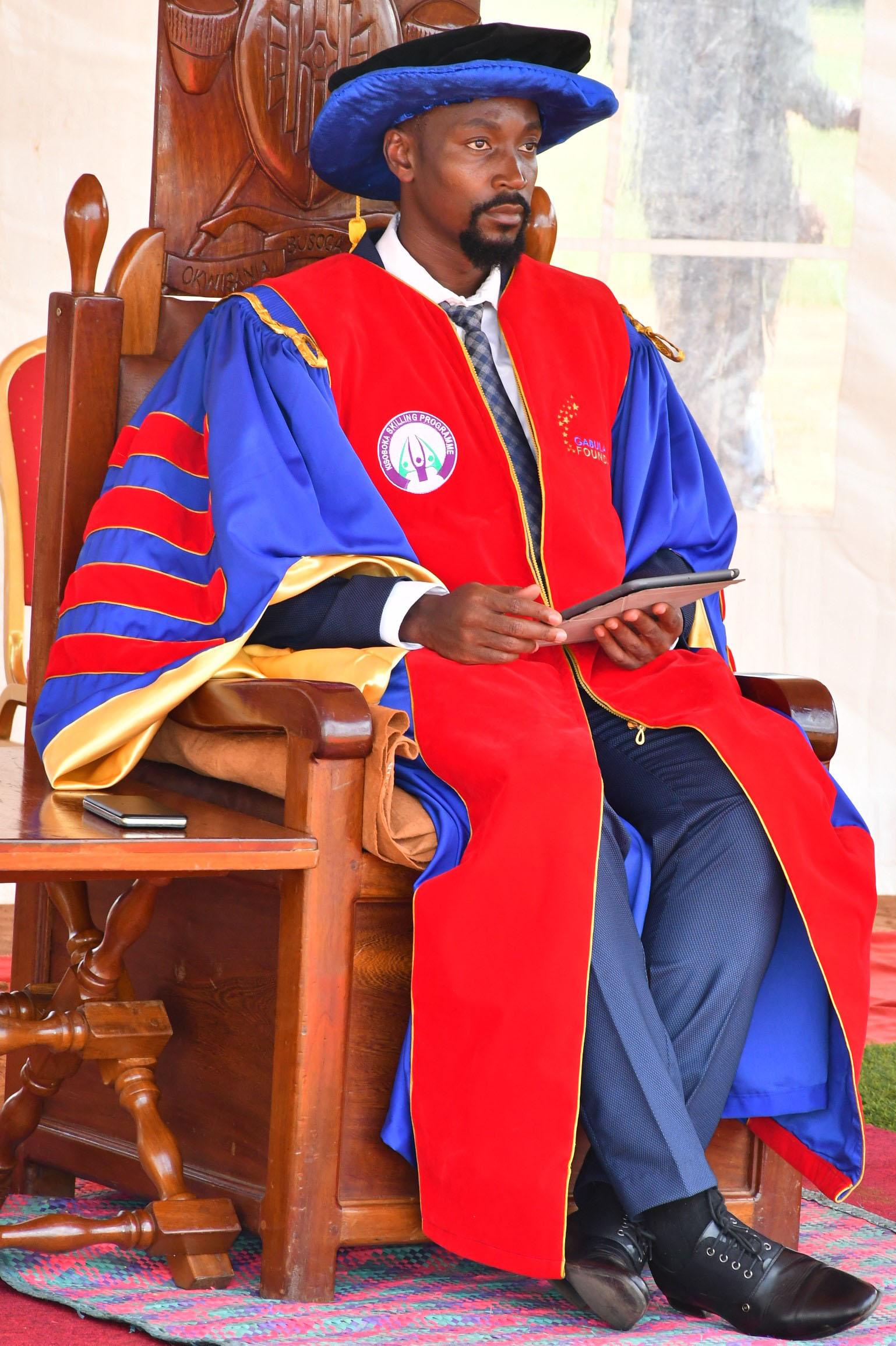

Sir William Wilberforce Kadhumbula Nadiope III (born in 1911) was the Prince of Bugabula, his father was Yosiya Nadiope who was the Bugabula Chief. He served as 1st Vice President of Uganda. He is the founder of Peoples Union Party of Uganda.

He was enthroned on 3 February 1930 after his return in 1929 from Britain for his formal education. He was later succeed by Henry Wako Muloki in 1955

He died in 1976.

== See also ==
- Henry Wako Muloki
