= Ntare IV of Nkore =

Omugabe of Nkore

Ntare IV
- Omugabe of Nkore
- Reign: Late precolonial period
- Predecessor: Mirindi
- Successor: Macwa
- Dynasty: Bahinda dynasty

Ntare IV of Nkore (c. 1699 death 1727), sometimes referred to as Ntare IV Nyakikoto Kitabanyoro, was the Omugabe of Nkore, a historic state located in what is now Uganda, from 1699 to 1727. The term "Omugabe" is translated in various ways but is most commonly equated to "king".His reign is noted for significant territorial growth, including the extension of Nkore's borders north to the River Katonga and the annexation of Kabula from the Kingdom of Bunyoro.

He ruled during the late precolonial period and is attested primarily through oral traditions, royal genealogies, and later historical reconstructions rather than contemporary written records such as Buhweju. Ntare IV's legacy(strengthening monarchical through instability) reflects the pastoralist society's emphasis on cattle-based power structures and defensive warfare, though specific achievements remain sparsely detailed due to the reliance on transmitted accounts prone to embellishment over generations.

The famous Ntare School in Mbarara has been named after this Omugabe.

== Background ==
The Kingdom of Nkore was one of the major Great Lakes kingdoms of East Africa, developing a centralized political system by the second millennium CE. It was governed by a hereditary monarch known as the Omugabe, whose authority combined political, military, and ritual roles. Royal succession was traditionally associated with the Bahinda dynasty, which provided most of Nkore’s rulers.

The regnal name Ntare was borne by several kings of Nkore, and numerical distinctions are used by modern historians to differentiate them. Ntare IV belonged to this dynastic tradition during a period when Nkore’s institutions were already well established, particularly its cattle-based economy and system of appointed chiefs. The military was organized into standing units called Emitwe. A notable figure of this period was the warrior Katare, son of Kobengo, whose military prowess remains a subject of traditional praise songs.

== Military campaigns ==
During the early 18th century, Nkore was invaded by the Banyoro under King Cwamali. Following an initial defeat, Ntare IV sought refuge in the caves of Nyamistindo and later on Kantsyore Island in the Kagera River. After reorganizing his forces, he launched a counter-offensive that successfully expelled the invaders and resulted in the death of Cwamali. This victory earned him the title Kiitabanyoro ('The Killer of Banyoro').

== See also ==
- Ankole
- Nkore language

Regnal titles
Preceded by Mirindi	Omugabe of Nkore; 1699–1727	Succeeded by Macwa
