= Kyabazinga of Busoga =

Ruler of the Kingdom of Busoga

- Coat of Arms of Busoga

Incumbent
- Nadiope IV since 13 September 2014

Details
- Style: His Majesty
- First monarch: Ezekiel Tenywa Wako
- Formed: 1939
- Residence: Igenge Palace

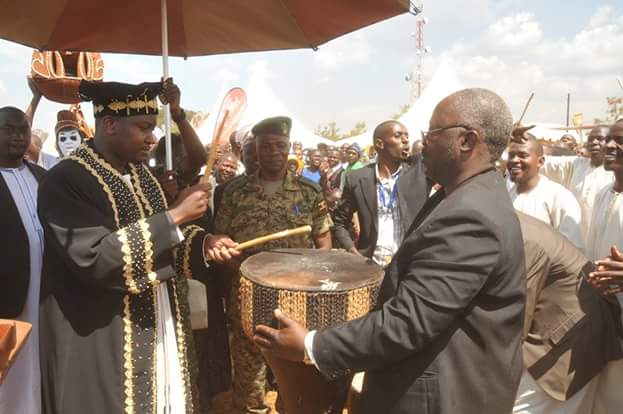
William Wilberforce Gabula Nadiope IV (2017)

The Kyabazinga of Busoga is the ruler of the Kingdom of Busoga in Uganda. Isebantu means "father of the people." This name was a symbol of unity derived from the expression and recognition by the people of Busoga that their leader was the "father of all people who brings all of them together", and who also serves as their cultural leader. Traditionally, the Kyabazinga throne rotates between chiefs in a timely election of the Lukiiko.

His Majesty William Wilberforce Gabula Nadiope IV is the current Kyabazinga.

== History ==
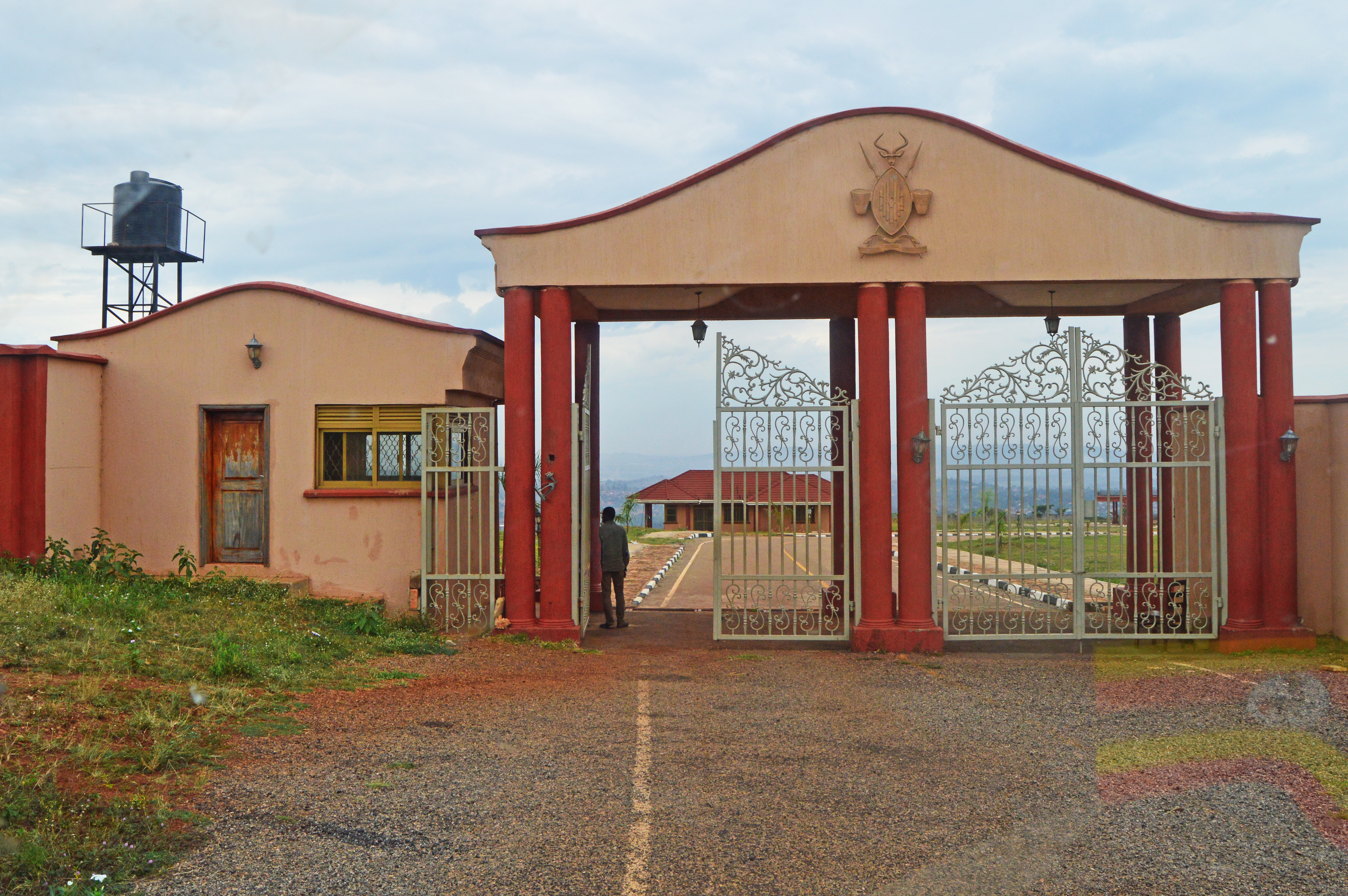
The Kyabazinga's palace.

Before Europeans came to Busoga, the Basoga organized themselves into 11 hereditary chiefdoms; with five of the leaders tracing their ancestry directly from Bunyoro, and the other six tracing their origins from Buganda. There was no king, although the chiefs often met and discussed issues of common interest. When they met, the chiefs would select a chairperson from among themselves to chair the session. They often met in Bukaleeba in Bunya (modern-day Mayuge District). In 1894, the Colonial administrator, William Grant, picked and formed a native chief's council (the Lukiiko of Busoga) under his chairmanship. Later, Semei Kakungulu, a Muganda, was brought in to make the chief's council conform to colonial rule. In 1905, with his efforts frustrated by internal bickering, he was dismissed. The eleven chiefs were asked to select from among themselves someone to represent their interests at the seat of the colonial government which was based in Bugembe, in modern-day Jinja District. At first the title of the leader of the group was referred to as "Chairman", which later changed to "President". Then the chiefs coined the title Kyabazinga in 1939.

The Kyabazinga of Busoga was abolished in 1967 when Milton Obote, the President of Uganda, disbanded all traditional institutions within the country. The Kyabazinga was restored with the restoration of traditional institutions in 1993 and Busoga re-crowned Henry Wako Muloki on 11 February 1995.

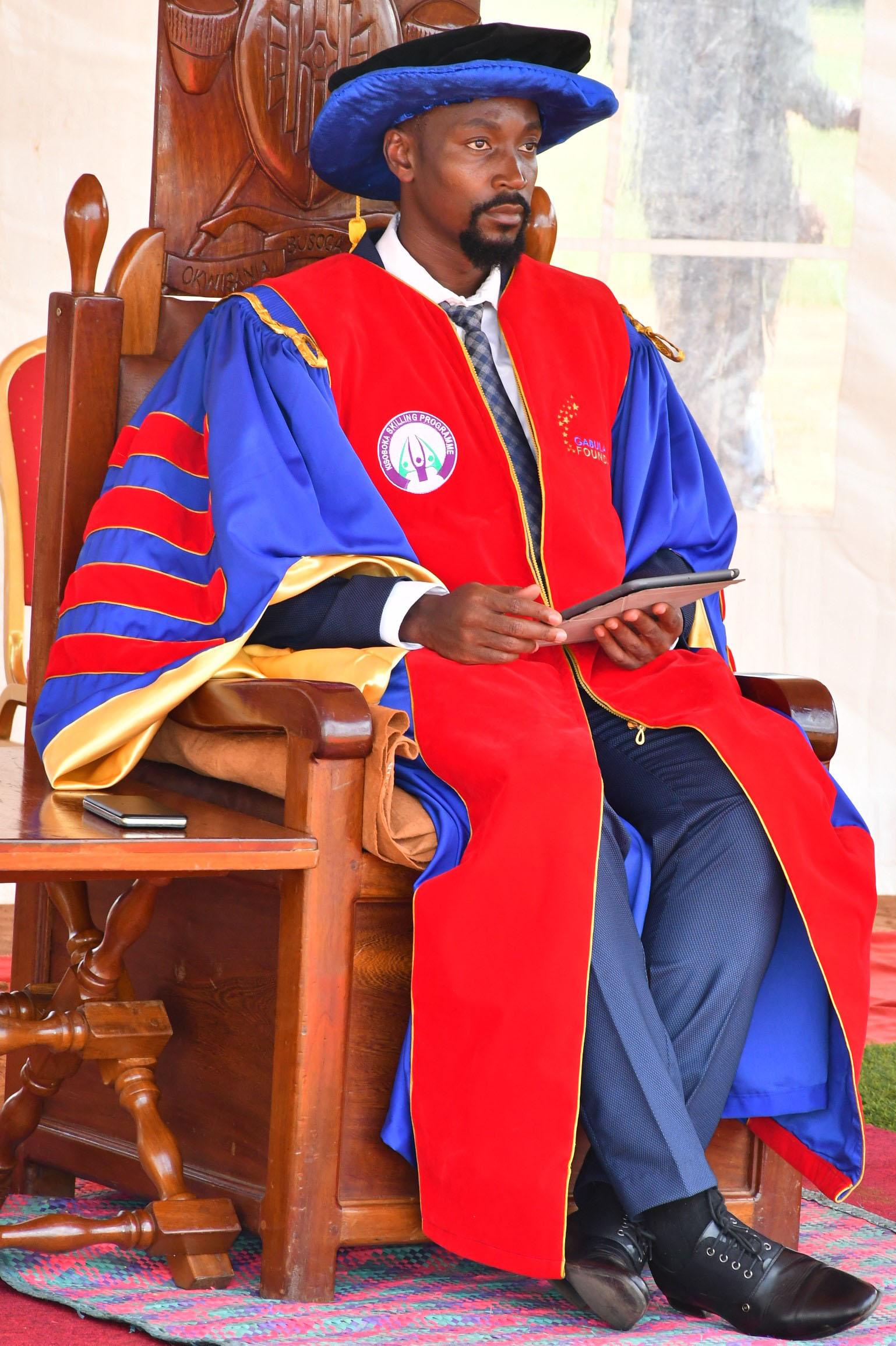
William Gabula Nadiope IV as Chancellor of the Kyabazinga Skilling Program

Muloki died on 1 September 2008. Since his death, the throne has been contested between Isebantu Edward Columbus Wambuzi Zibondo XIII, and William Wilberforce Kadhumbula Gabula Nadiope IV. On 31 October 2008, Wambuzi was declared the winner of an election which was immediately challenged by Chief Fred Menhya Kakaire. Though the challenge was unsuccessful, "Prince Wambuzi was never recognized by the courts and government and was, therefore, never enthroned, creating an eight-year vacuum". Gabula was formally elected on 23 August 2014 and crowned on 13 September. Wambuzi accuses Gabula of fraudulently attaining the throne, and then dubiously changing the Busoga constitution in November 2017.

== The eleven Busoga chiefdoms ==
As of March 2015, the following is the list of the names of the eleven Busoga Chiefs.

List of Busoga Chieftaincies and Current officeholders
Rank	Chieftaincy	Title of Chieftain	Name of Current Chief
1	Bugabula	The Gabula of Bugabula	William Gabula Nadiope IV – Current Kyabazinga
2	Bugweri	The Menha of Bugweri	Samuel Nkuutu Menha
3	Bukholi	The Wakholi of Bukholi	David Kaunhe Wakholi
4	Bukono	The Nkono of Bukono	Samuel Kamaga Nkono
5	Bulamogi	The Zibondo of Bulamogi	Edward Colombus Wambuzi
6	Bunhole	The Nanhumba of Bunhole	Nkwighe Bukumunhe Muzamiru Nanhumba
7	Bunya	The Luba of Bunya	Haji Juma Luba Munuulo
8	Busiki	The Kisiki of Busiki	Yekoniya Isiko Kisiki
9	Butembe	The Ntembe of Butembe	Yasin Waguma Ntembe
10	Kigulu	The Ngobi of Kigulu	Patrick Izimba Gologolo Ngobi
11	Luuka	The Tabingwa of Luuka	Wellington Nabwana Tabingwa

== Election ==
The Kyabazingaship in Busoga is an elected post. The Kyabazinga was initially chosen from among the five hereditary chiefs who trace their ancestry directly from Bunyoro-Kitara. Busoga's constitution has been modified to allow all 11 hereditary chiefs to stand for election as Kyabazinga.

As of May 2018, the post is elected for life, which has been the case since November 2017. However, between 1993 and 2000, and for the 2014 election, under Articles 6 and 8 of the Busogan constitution, appointments were for five years only.

== List of Kyabazingas of Busoga ==
List of the Kyabazingas of Busoga
Rank	Name of Kyabazinga	Reign
1	Ezekiel Tenywa Wako	1939–1949
2	William Wilberforce Nadiope II	1949–1955
3	Henry Wako Muloki	1955–1962
0	William Wilberforce Nadiope	1962–1967
3	Henry Wako Muloki	1995–2008
4	Wilberforce Gabula Nadiope IV	2014 – present

== See also ==
- Igenge Palace
