= Nadiope IV of Busoga =

Kyabazinga of Busoga and Gabula of Bugabula

William Gabula Nadiope IV

Kyabazinga of Busoga Gabula of Bugabula
- Reign: 13 September 2014 – present
- Coronation: 14 September 2014
- Predecessor: Henry Wako Muloki
- Born: 1 November 1988 (age 38); Kamuli, Uganda
- Spouse: Jovia Mutesi (m. 2023)
- Father: Wilson Gabula Nadiope
- Mother: Josephine Nadiope

William Wilberforce Kadhumbula Gabula Nadiope IV (born 1 November 1988), the Gabula of Bugabula, is the reigning Kyabazinga of Busoga, a constitutional kingdom in modern-day Uganda. He is the fourth Kyabazinga of Busoga.

== Claim to the throne ==
Gabula was born in Jinja on 1 November 1988. He is the son of Wilson Gabula Nadiope III, one time minister of tourism in the Ugandan Cabinet, who died in 1991, and Josephine Nadiope who died in 1993. His paternal grandfather is William Wilberforce Kadhumbula Nadiope II, who ruled as Kyabazinga from 1949 until 1955 and from 1962 until 1966. Nadiope II was also the first vice president of Uganda, from 1962 until 1966.

Gabula Nadiope was unanimously elected by the ten Busoga Royal Chiefs who convened at Bugembe on 23 August 2014 for the purpose of electing a new Kyabazinga. Prince Edward Columbus Wambuzi, the eleventh Busoga Royal Chief, who was also contesting for the throne, did not attend the meeting. Gabula was unanimously approved by the Busoga Lukiko (Parliament) on 25 September 2014. Following an unsuccessful last-minute court challenge, Prince William Gabula was crowned as the 4th Kyabazinga of Busoga at Bugembe on Saturday, 13 September 2014. President Yoweri Museveni of Uganda attended the coronation.

== Education and work ==
Gabula was raised by his maternal grandmother in Jinja. He started his Primary Education at Victoria Nile, Winston Day and Boarding Primary School Kawempe, then Lohana Academy from 1995 until 2001.

In 2002, he entered Busoga College Mwiri for his O-Level studies until 2005. He continued with his A-Level education, at Kyambogo College School, graduating in 2007.

He was admitted to Kyambogo University, graduating in 2011, with the degree of Bachelor of Arts in Economics.

At the time of his coronation, he was employed as an Economist in the Uganda Ministry of Energy and Mineral Resources. He then went for further studies in the United Kingdom and graduated in 2015 with a First Class master's degree in Business Administration (Management) at Coventry University.

== Personal life ==
Gabula's great grandfather Yosia Nadiope is the father of modern education in Busoga. He gave land to missionaries to build Balangira School for teaching royals, which later evolved to Busoga College Mwiri.

He is of the Anglican faith. He is also the hereditary chief of Bugabula, the semi-autonomous chiefdom which includes the modern-day districts of Buyende and Kamuli.

On 18 November 2023, Gabula married Inhebantu Jovia Mutesi, an accountant by profession and an old girl of Mount Saint Mary's College Namagunga at Christ Cathedral Bugembe, the only royal wedding in the kingdom since 1956.

The couple welcomed a set of twin boys on 27 August 2025. Just over a year after the firstborn twins, the royal family welcomed their third son on November 18 2026.

== See also ==
- Busoga sub-region
- Basoga
- Lusoga
- Ezekiel Tenywa Wako of Busoga
