= Henry Wako Muloki =

Kyabazinga of Busoga
- Reign: 1955–1966; February 11, 1995 – September 1, 2008
- Predecessor: Sir William Wilberforce Nadiope
- Successor: William Wilberforce Gabula Nadiope IV
- Born: February 18, 1921; Bulamogi county, Kamuli District
- Died: September 1, 2008 (aged 87); Kampala, Uganda
- Burial: Kaliro District, Uganda
- Spouse: Alice Muloki
- Issue: 8
- Father: Ezekiel Tenywa Wako
- Mother: Yunia Nakibande

Kyabazinga Henry Wako Muloki OBE (February 18, 1921 – September 1, 2008) was a Ugandan Kyabazinga of Busoga, the title given to the ruler of the Kingdom of Busoga, a traditional kingdom within Uganda. Muloki first became Kyabazinga of Busoga in 1955, a position he held until then Ugandan Prime Minister Milton Obote abolished all traditional institutions and kingdoms within the country in 1966. Muloki regained the title of Kyabazinga on February 11, 1995, after the Ugandan government restored the traditional kingdoms.

Muloki was the oldest surviving traditional ruler in Uganda at the time of his death in 2008 at the age of 87. He was the first recorded sitting Kyabazinga to die in office.

== Biography ==
Henry Wako Muloki ascended to the throne of the Kingdom of Busoga as Kyabazinga of Busoga (Isebantu Kyabazinga) in 1955 when he was 34 years old. Muloki succeeded the late Sir William Wilberforce Nadiope as Kyabazinga.

Muloki lost both his traditional title and kingdom in 1966 when the Prime Minister of Uganda, Milton Obote, abolished all traditional titles and institutions within Uganda. Obote's plan also disbanded the four traditional kingdoms within Uganda, including Muloki's own Kingdom of Busoga.

Muloki regained his title and crown on February 11, 1995, following the restoration of traditional institutions and kingdoms, including the Kingdom of Busoga, by the Ugandan government. Usually, the Kyabazinga is elected from within five of the eleven Busoga royal traditional chiefs to be held for a specific period of time. However, when Muloki was elected Kyabazinga, the chiefs of the Busoga people decided that Muloki should rule for life in recognition of his leadership, life contributions and age.

Muloki was diagnosed with esophageal cancer during the latter part of his reign. He underwent surgery for the disease in Italy in 2007. Muloki was further admitted to Kampala International Hospital in 2008. Shortly before his death, Muloki was hospitalized in India for two weeks. He was so ill that he had to be flown back to Uganda in the country's Gulfstream IV-SP.

=== Death ===
Henry Wako Muloki died at the Mulago Hospital Cancer Institute in Kampala, Uganda, at 4 A.M. on September 1, 2008, at the age of 87. He was survived by his four sons and three daughters, including Princess Rebecca Muloki. His wife, Alice Muloki, the Inhebantu of Busoga, died in November 2005. Two of Muloki's children reside in the United States and United Kingdom.

Muloki's body was taken to the National Assembly of Uganda (Parliament) in Kampala to lie in state. He was then taken to Nakabango palace for a night vigil. Following the Kampala commemorations, a public viewing then took place in Bugembe, the seat of the Kingdom of Busoga. His body was then taken to Muloki's ancestral home in Kaliro District for burial.

Under Busoga law, the sitting Busoga Prime Minister, Wilson Muwereza, who had served as Muloki's prime minister for over six years, and "the heads of the eleven royal chiefs who head clan lines" will run the Kingdom of Busoga following Muloki's death. The Prime Minister and eleven Busoga royal chiefs will jointly choose a successor and elect a new Kyabazinga within 60 to 90 days of Muloki's death.
