= 1956 =

1956 in various calendars
- Gregorian calendar: 1956; MCMLVI
- Ab urbe condita: 2709
- Armenian calendar: 1405; ԹՎ ՌՆԵ
- Assyrian calendar: 6706
- Baháʼí calendar: 112–113
- Balinese saka calendar: 1877–1878
- Bengali calendar: 1362–1363
- Berber calendar: 2906
- British Regnal year: 4 Eliz. 2 – 5 Eliz. 2
- Buddhist calendar: 2500
- Burmese calendar: 1318
- Byzantine calendar: 7464–7465
- Chinese calendar: 乙未年 (Wood Goat); 4653 or 4446 — to — 丙申年 (Fire Monkey); 4654 or 4447
- Coptic calendar: 1672–1673
- Discordian calendar: 3122
- Ethiopian calendar: 1948–1949
- Hebrew calendar: 5716–5717
- Hindu calendars
- Vikram Samvat: 2012–2013
- Shaka Samvat: 1877–1878
- Kali Yuga: 5056–5057
- Holocene calendar: 11956
- Igbo calendar: 956–957
- Iranian calendar: 1334–1335
- Islamic calendar: 1375–1376
- Japanese calendar: Shōwa 31 (昭和３１年)
- Javanese calendar: 1887–1888
- Juche calendar: 45
- Julian calendar: Gregorian minus 13 days
- Korean calendar: 4289
- Minguo calendar: ROC 45 民國45年
- Nanakshahi calendar: 488
- Thai solar calendar: 2499
- Tibetan calendar: ཤིང་མོ་ལུག་ལོ་ (female Wood-Sheep); 2082 or 1701 or 929 — to — མེ་ཕོ་སྤྲེ་ལོ་ (male Fire-Monkey); 2083 or 1702 or 930

1956 (MCMLVI) was a leap year starting on Sunday of the Gregorian calendar, the 1956th year of the Common Era (CE) and Anno Domini (AD) designations, the 956th year of the 2nd millennium, the 56th year of the 20th century, and the 7th year of the 1950s decade.

== Events ==
=== January ===
- January 1 – The Anglo-Egyptian Condominium ends in Sudan after 57 years.
- January 8 – Operation Auca: Five U.S. evangelical Christian missionaries, Nate Saint, Roger Youderian, Ed McCully, Jim Elliot and Pete Fleming, are killed for trespassing by the Waorani people of Ecuador, shortly after making contact with them.
- January 16 – Egyptian leader Gamal Abdel Nasser vows to Liberate Palestine.
- January 25–26 – Finnish troops reoccupy Porkkala, after Soviet troops vacate its military base. Civilians can return February 4.
- January 26 – The 1956 Winter Olympics open in Cortina d'Ampezzo, Italy.

=== February ===
- February 11 – British spies Guy Burgess and Donald Maclean resurface in the Soviet Union, after being missing for 5 years.
- February 14–25 – The 20th Congress of the Communist Party of the Soviet Union is held in Moscow.
- February 16 – The 1956 World Figure Skating Championships open in Garmisch, West Germany.
- February 25 – Nikita Khrushchev attacks the veneration of Joseph Stalin, in a speech "On the Cult of Personality and Its Consequences", at a secret session concluding the 20th Congress of the Communist Party of the Soviet Union. This is not officially made public in the Soviet Union at this time but becomes known in the West in June.

=== March ===
- March 1 – The International Air Transport Association finalizes a draft of the radiotelephony spelling alphabet, for the International Civil Aviation Organization.
- March 2 – Morocco declares its independence from France.
- March 9
  - The British deport Archbishop Makarios from Cyprus to the Seychelles.
  - The Soviet Armed Forces suppress mass demonstrations in the Georgian Soviet Socialist Republic, reacting to Nikita Khrushchev's de-Stalinization policy.
- March 10 – The Fairey Delta 2 breaks the World Air Speed Record, raising it to 1,132 mph (1,822 km/h) or Mach 1.73, an increase of some 300 mph (480 km/h) over the previous record, and thus becoming the first aircraft to exceed 1,000 mph (1,600 km/h) in level flight.
- March 12 – 96 U.S. Congressmen sign the Southern Manifesto, a protest against the 1954 Supreme Court ruling (Brown v. Board of Education) that desegregated public education.
- March 19 – At age 48, Dutch boxer Bep van Klaveren contests his last match in Rotterdam.
- March 20 – Tunisia gains independence from France.
- March 21 – The 28th Academy Awards Ceremony is held in Los Angeles. Marty is awarded Best Picture.
- March 23 – Pakistan becomes the first Islamic republic, and a national holiday is observed in the country, including the state of East Pakistan.

=== April ===
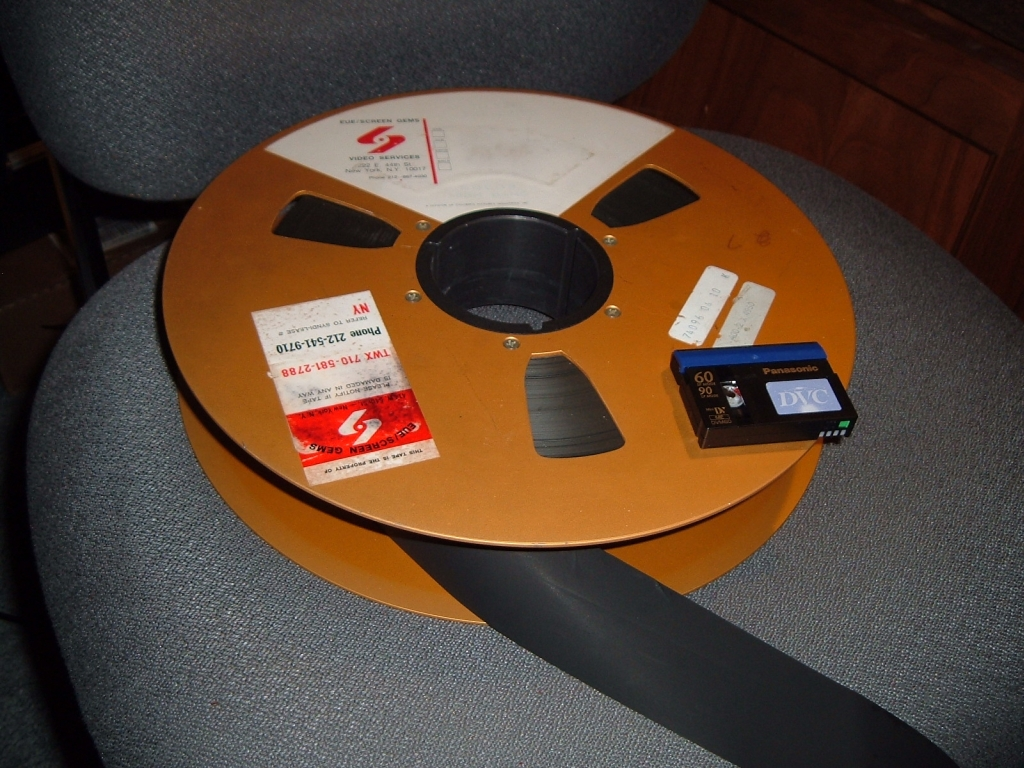
A reel of 2-inch quadruplex videotape compared with a later miniDV videocassette.

- April 7 – Spain relinquishes its protectorate in Morocco.
- April 9 – Habib Bourguiba is elected President of the National Constituent Assembly of the Kingdom of Tunisia; on April 15 he becomes prime minister.
- April 14 – Videotape is first demonstrated at the 1956 NARTB (modern-day NAB) convention in Chicago, United States, by Ampex. It is the demonstration of the first practical and commercially successful videotape format known as 2" Quadruplex.
- April 18 – American actress Grace Kelly legally marries Rainier III, Prince of Monaco; a religious ceremony follows next day.
- April 19
  - British diver Lionel (Buster) Crabb (working for MI6) dives into Portsmouth Harbour, to investigate a visiting Soviet cruiser, and vanishes.
  - The 5.0 M_{w} 1956 Atarfe-Albolote earthquake strikes southern Spain killing 12 and injuring dozens more.

=== May ===
- May 1 – Minamata disease is discovered in Japan.
- May 2 – The United Methodist Church in America decides, at its General Conference, to grant women full ordained clergy status. It also calls for an end to racial segregation in the denomination.
- May 8 – The constitutional union between Indonesia and the Netherlands is dissolved.
- May 9 – Manaslu, eighth highest mountain in the world (in the Nepalese Himalayas) is first ascended, by a Japanese team.
- May 18 – Lhotse main summit, the fourth highest mountain (on the Nepalese–Tibetan border) is first ascended, by Fritz Luchsinger and Ernst Reiss.
- May 23 – French minister Pierre Mendès France resigns, due to his government's policy on Algeria.
- May 24 – The first Eurovision Song Contest is broadcast from Lugano, Switzerland. The winning song is the host country's Refrain by Lys Assia (music by Géo Voumard, lyrics by Émile Gardaz).
- May 25 – India announces the institution of diplomatic relations with Francoist Spain.

=== June ===
- June 1 – Vyacheslav Molotov resigns as foreign minister of the Soviet Union; he later becomes ambassador to Mongolia.
- June 4 – Montgomery bus boycott: The related civil suit is heard in federal district court; the U.S. Supreme Court will uphold the ruling in November.
- June 5 – The text of Nikita Khrushchev's February attack on Stalin's reputation, "On the Cult of Personality and Its Consequences", is first published in the West, in The New York Times.
- June 6 – In Singapore, chief minister David Marshall resigns a little over a year into his chief ministership, after the breakdown of talks regarding internal self-government in London.
- June 8 – General Electric/Telechron introduces model 7H241 "The Snooz Alarm", the first snooze alarm clock ever.
- June 10 – 1956 Summer Olympics: Equestrian events open in Stockholm, Sweden (all other events are held in November in Melbourne, Australia).
- June 13
  - The International Criminal Police Organization adopts Interpol as its official name.
  - Real Madrid beats Stade Reims 4–3 at Parc des Princes, Paris and wins the 1955–56 European Cup (football).
- June 14 – The Flag of the United States Army is formally dedicated.
- June 15 – Eindhoven University of Technology is founded in Eindhoven, The Netherlands.
- June 21 – Playwright Arthur Miller appears before the House Un-American Activities Committee in Washington, D.C.
- June 23 – Gamal Abdel Nasser becomes the 2nd president of Egypt, a post he holds until his death in 1970.
- June 28
  - Poznań 1956 protests: Labour riots in Poznań, Poland, are crushed with heavy loss of life. Soviet troops fire at a crowd protesting high prices, killing 53 people.
  - The film version of Rodgers and Hammerstein's The King and I, starring Deborah Kerr and Yul Brynner, is released only a few months after the film version of R&H's Carousel. It becomes the most financially successful film version of a Rodgers and Hammerstein musical up to this time, and the only one to win an acting Oscar (Yul Brynner wins Best Actor for his performance as the King of Siam). It is also one of two Rodgers and Hammerstein films to be nominated for Best Picture (which it does not win).
- June 29
  - Actress Marilyn Monroe marries playwright Arthur Miller, in White Plains, New York.
  - President Dwight D. Eisenhower signs the Federal Aid Highway Act of 1956, creating the Interstate Highway System in the United States.
- June 30 – 1956 Grand Canyon mid-air collision: A TWA Lockheed Constellation and United Airlines Douglas DC-7 collide in mid-air over the Grand Canyon in Arizona, killing all 128 people aboard both aircraft, in the deadliest civil aviation disaster to date; the accident leads to sweeping changes in the regulation of cross-country flight and air traffic control over the United States.

=== July ===
- July 2 – A laboratory experiment involving scrap thorium at Sylvania Electric Products in Bayside, New York, results in an explosion that causes the death of an employee.
- July 4 – An American Lockheed U-2 reconnaissance aircraft makes its first flight over the Soviet Union.
- July 9 – The 7.7 M_{w} Amorgos earthquake shakes the Cyclades island group in the Aegean Sea, with a maximum Mercalli intensity of IX (Violent). The shaking and the subsequent tsunami leave 53 people dead.
- July 13 – John McCarthy (Dartmouth), Marvin Minsky (MIT), Claude Shannon (Bell Labs) and Nathaniel Rochester (IBM) assemble the first coordinated research meeting on the topic of artificial intelligence, at Dartmouth College, Hanover, New Hampshire, in the United States.
- July 25 – The Italian ocean liner SS Andrea Doria sinks after colliding with the Swedish ship SS Stockholm in heavy fog 72 kilometers (45 mi) south of Nantucket island, killing 51.
- July 26 – Egyptian president Gamal Abdel Nasser nationalizes the Suez Canal, sparking international condemnation.
- July 30 – A joint resolution of Congress is signed by President Dwight D. Eisenhower, authorizing "In God we trust" as the U.S. national motto.

=== August ===
- August 7 – Seven ammunition trucks loaded with 1,053 boxes of dynamite explode in Cali, Colombia. Death estimates range from 1,300 to 10,000, in a city that at this time has 120,000 inhabitants.
- August 8 – 262 miners (chiefly Italian nationals) die in a fire at the Bois du Cazier coal mine, in Marcinelle, Belgium.
- August 12 – Around 5,000 members of the Romanian Greek-Catholic Church hold a mass outside Cluj-Napoca Piarists' Church to demonstrate that their church, proscribed by the government in 1948, has not ceased to exist as the regime claims.
- August 17 – West Germany bans the Communist Party of Germany.
- The first interfaith dialogue between Christians, Jews and Muslims with over 850 participants takes place at the monastery of Toumliline in Azrou, Morocco.

=== September ===
- September 13
  - The hard disk drive is invented by an IBM team, led by Reynold B. Johnson.
  - The dike around the Dutch polder East Flevoland is closed.
- September 16 – Television broadcasting in Australia commences.
- September 25 – The submarine transatlantic telephone cable opens.
- September 27 – The Bell X-2 becomes the first crewed aircraft to reach Mach 3.

=== October ===
- October 10
  - Finland joins UNESCO.
  - The prototype Lockheed L-1649 Starliner, the final Lockheed Constellation model, makes its first flight.
- October 14 – Dalit Buddhist movement (India): B. R. Ambedkar, Dalit leader, converts to Buddhism, along with 500,000 followers.
- October 15 – The British Royal Air Force retires its last Avro Lancaster bomber.
- October 17
  - The world's first industrial-scale commercial nuclear power plant is opened at Calder Hall in the UK.
  - The Game of the Century (chess): 13-year-old Bobby Fischer beats grandmaster Donald Byrne, in the Rosenwald Memorial Tournament in New York City.
- October 19 – The Soviet–Japanese Joint Declaration of 1956 is signed in Moscow, ending the legal state of war between the Soviet Union and Japan (with effect from December 12) and making possible the restoration of diplomatic relations between the two nations.
- October 23 – The Hungarian Revolution breaks out against the pro-Soviet government, originating as a student demonstration in Budapest. Hungary attempts to leave the Warsaw Pact.
- October 24 – The Protocol of Sèvres, a secret agreement between Israel, France and the United Kingdom, is signed, allowing the former to invade the Sinai Peninsula of Egypt and occupy the Suez Canal with the support of the other two governments, giving rise to the Suez Crisis.
- October 26 – Soviet Red Army troops invade Hungary.
- October 29
  - Suez Crisis: Israel invades the Sinai Peninsula and pushes Egyptian forces back toward the Suez Canal.
  - Tangier Protocol: The international city Tangier is reintegrated into Morocco.
  - The Huntley-Brinkley Report debuts on NBC-TV in the United States.
- October 31
  - Suez Crisis: The United Kingdom and France begin bombing Egypt to force the reopening of the Suez Canal.
  - A United States Navy team becomes the third group to reach the South Pole (arriving by air), and commences construction of the first permanent Amundsen–Scott South Pole Station.

=== November ===
- November 1 – The States Reorganisation Act of India reforms the boundaries and names of Indian states. Three new states, Kerala, Karnataka and Andhra Pradesh, are formed.
- November 3 – Khan Yunis massacre (Suez Crisis): Israeli soldiers shoot dead hundreds of Palestinian refugees and local inhabitants in Khan Yunis Camp.
- November 4 – Hungarian Revolution of 1956: More Soviet troops invade Hungary, to crush the revolt that started on October 23. Thousands are killed, more are wounded, and nearly a quarter million leave the country.
- November 6 – 1956 United States presidential election: Republican incumbent Dwight D. Eisenhower defeats Democratic challenger Adlai Stevenson, in a rematch of their contest 4 years earlier.
- November 7 – Suez Crisis: The United Nations General Assembly adopts a resolution calling for the United Kingdom, France and Israel to withdraw their troops from Arab lands immediately.
- November 11 – Hungarian Revolution of 1956: Last insurgents succumb to the invading Soviet army.
- November 12 – Morocco, Sudan and Tunisia join the United Nations.
- November 13 – Browder v. Gayle: The United States Supreme Court declares illegal the state and municipal laws requiring segregated buses in Montgomery, Alabama, thus ending the Montgomery bus boycott.
- November 14 – An eight-mile long stretch of highway is opened west of Topeka, Kansas, creating the first portion of the Interstate Highway System in the United States and the first highway to be completed with funds from the Federal Aid Highway Act of 1956.
- November 18 – At a reception for Western ambassadors at the Polish embassy in Moscow, Nikita Khrushchev utters his famous phrase "We will bury you".
- November 20 – In Yugoslavia, former prime minister Milovan Đilas is arrested after he criticizes Josip Broz Tito.
- November 22 – The 1956 Summer Olympics begin in Melbourne, Australia.
- November 23 – The Suez Crisis causes petrol rationing in Britain.
- November 25 – Fidel Castro and Che Guevara depart from Tuxpan, Veracruz, Mexico, en route to Santiago de Cuba aboard the yacht Granma, with 82 men.
- November 28 – Roger Vadim's film And God Created Woman (Et Dieu... créa la femme), is released in France, making Brigitte Bardot an international sex symbol.
- November 30 – African-American Floyd Patterson wins the world heavyweight boxing championship that is vacant after the retirement of Rocky Marciano.

=== December ===
- December 3 – The 1956 Bush Terminal explosion occurs in Brooklyn, United States.
- December 9 – Trans-Canada Air Lines Flight 810, a Canadair North Star, crashes into Slesse Mountain near Chilliwack, British Columbia. All 62 people aboard, including five Canadian Football League players, are killed.
- December 12 – Japan becomes a member of the United Nations.
- December 19 – British doctor John Bodkin Adams is arrested for the murder of 2 patients in Eastbourne, England; he will be acquitted.
- December 23 – British and French troops leave the Suez Canal region.

== Births ==
=== January ===
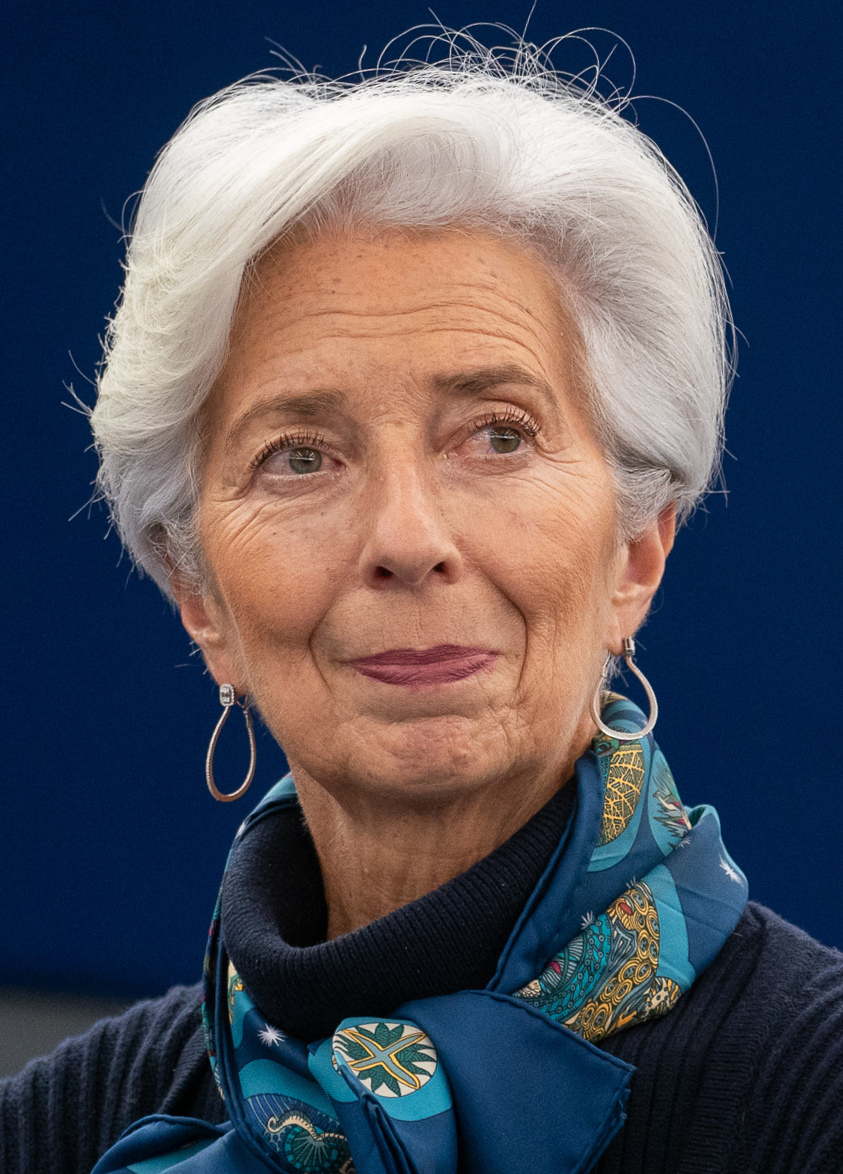
Christine Lagarde

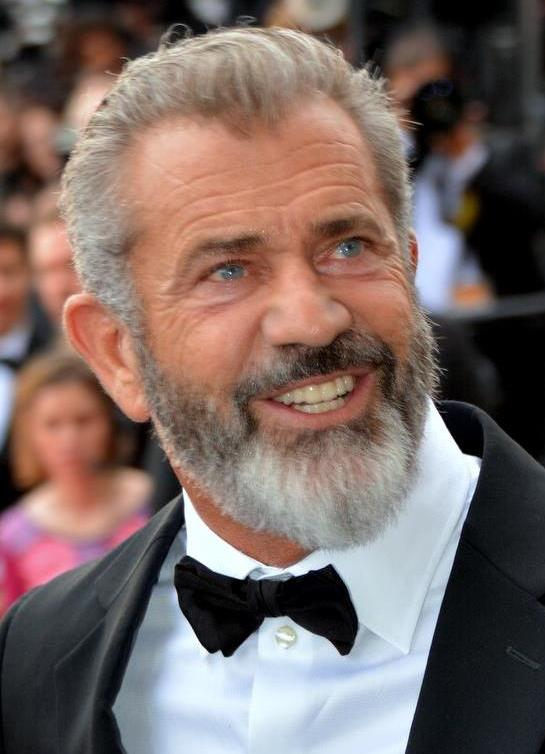
Mel Gibson

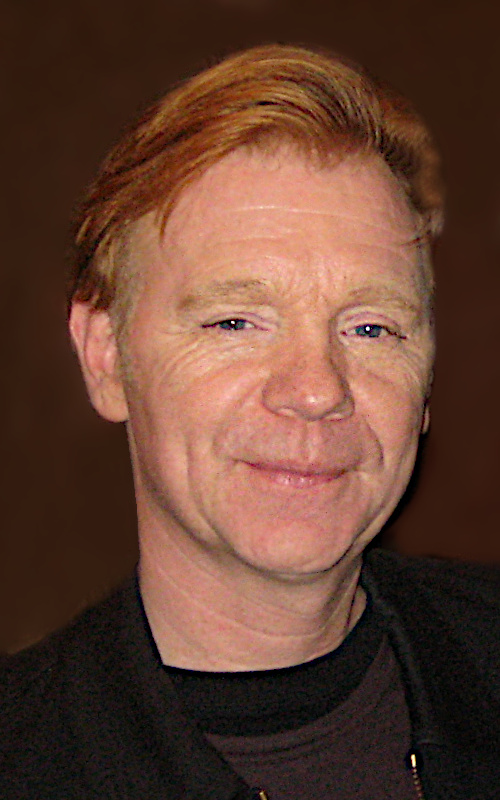
David Caruso

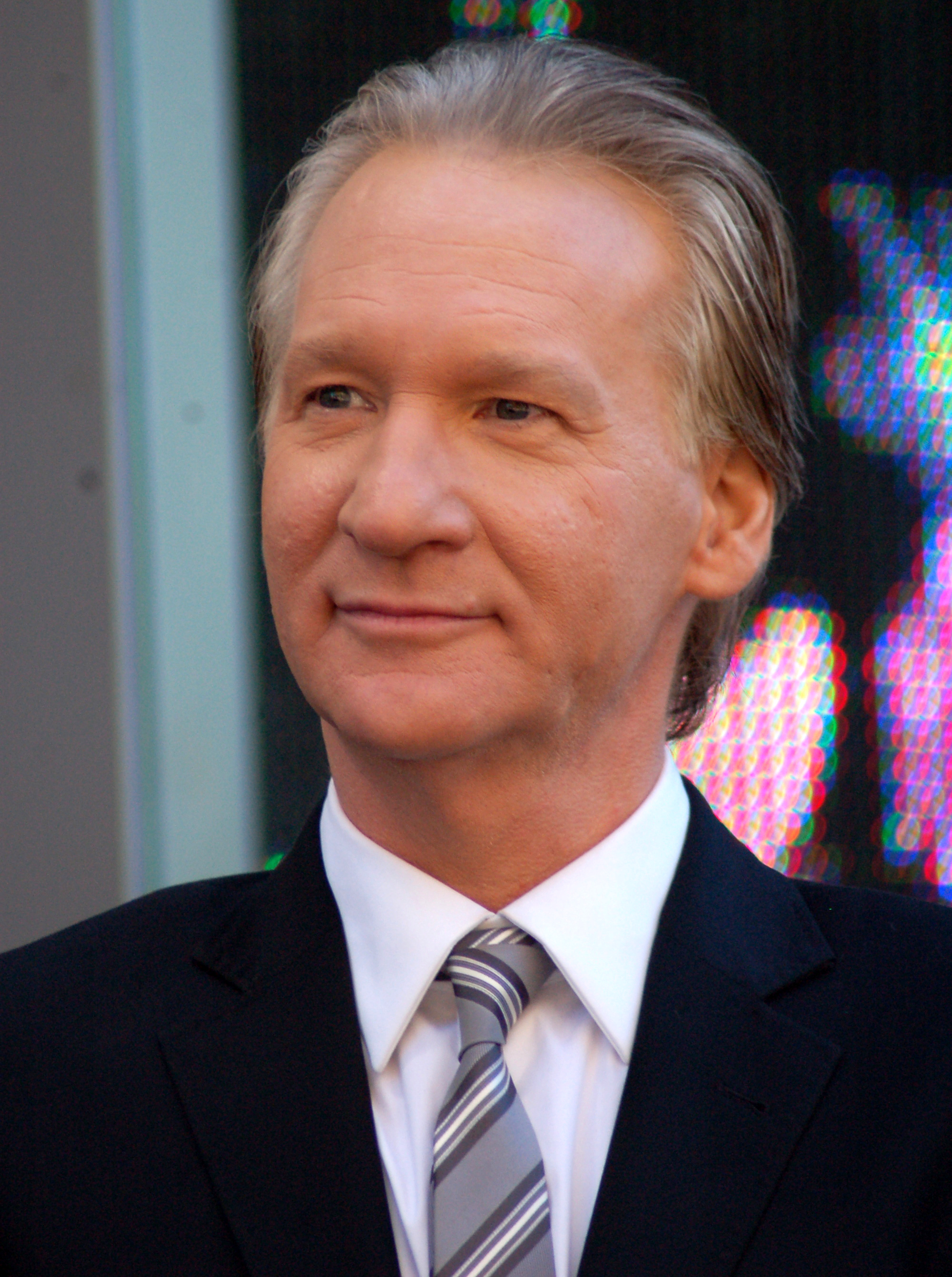
Bill Maher

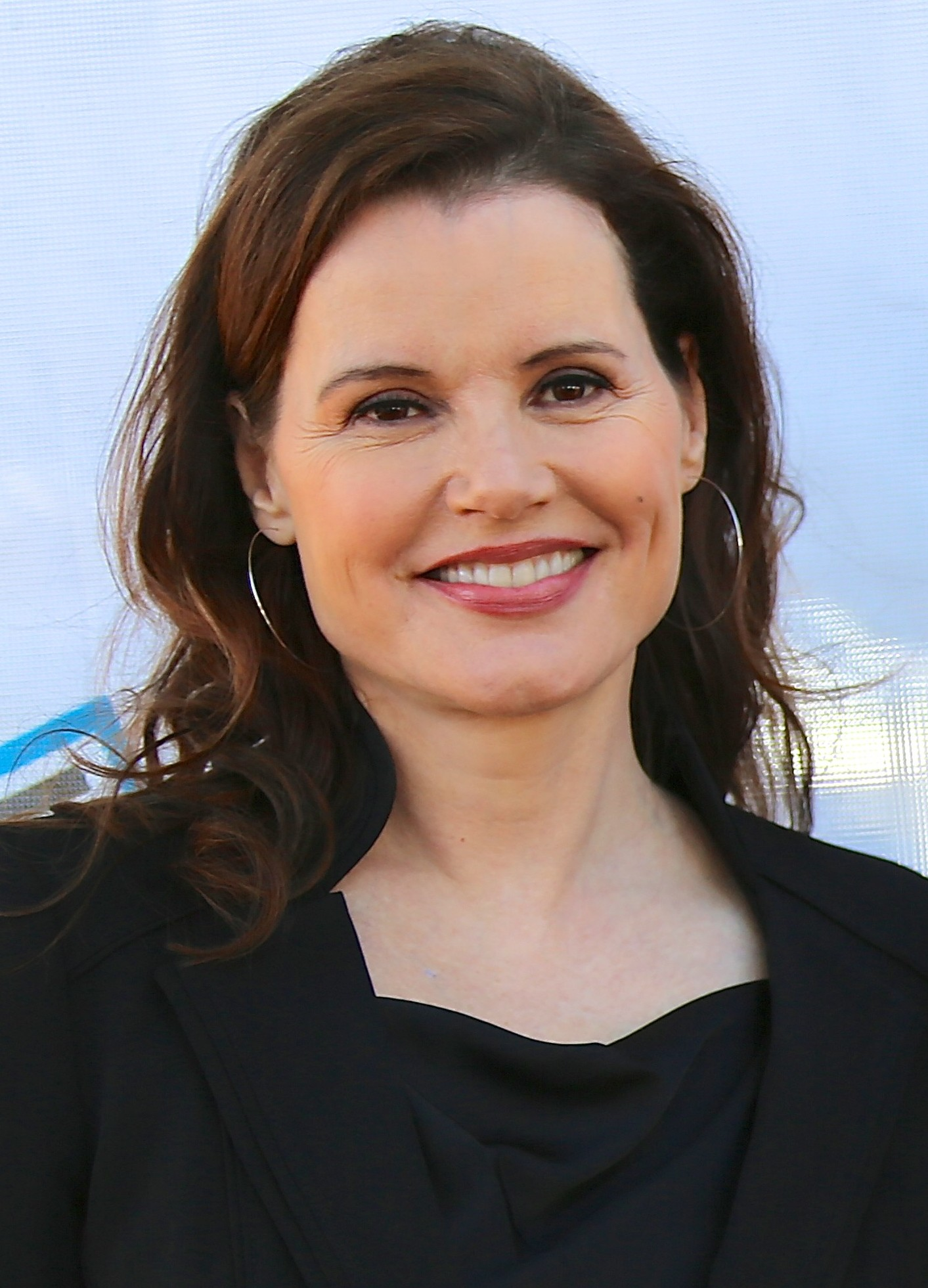
Geena Davis

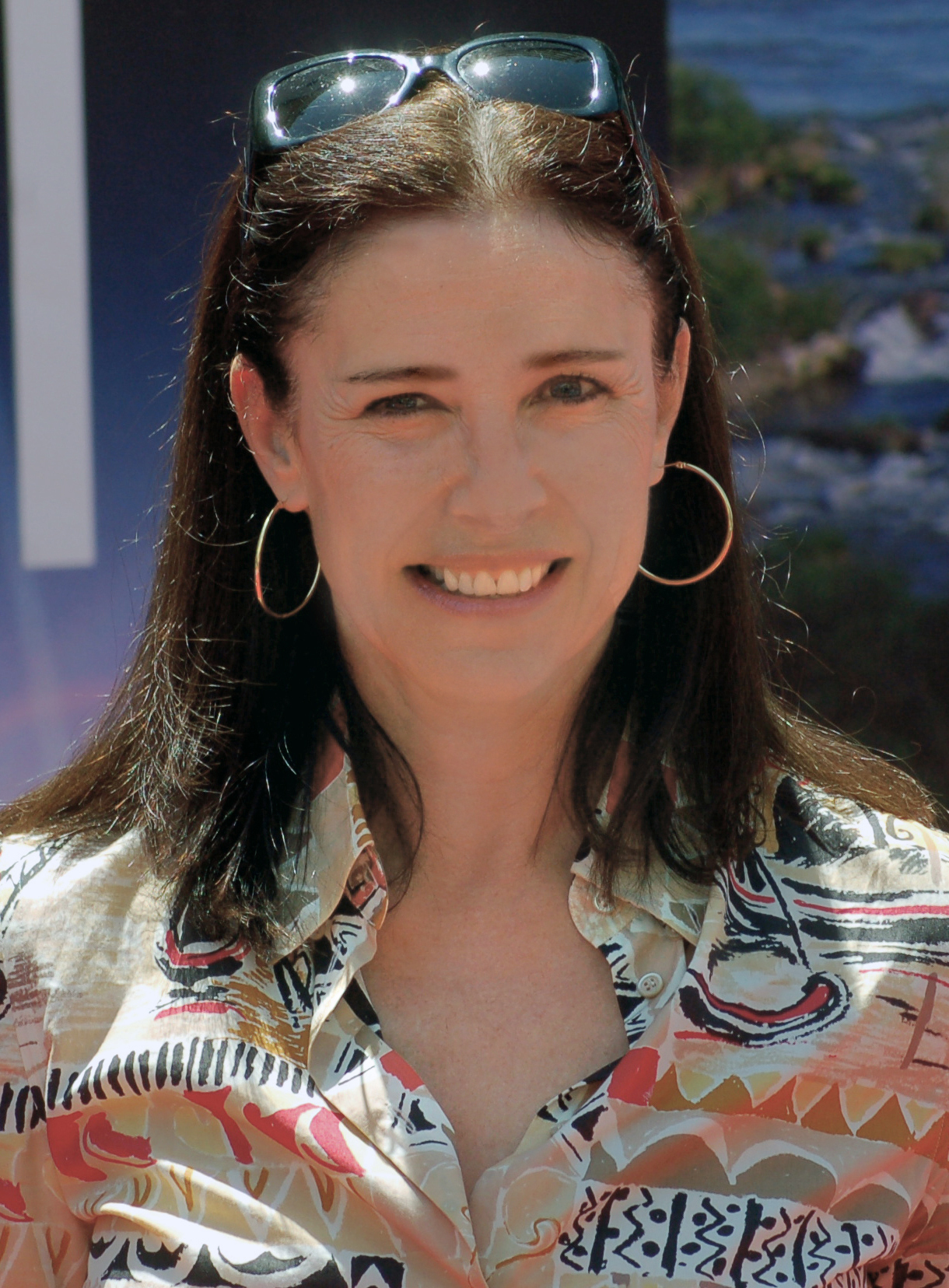
Mimi Rogers

- January 1
  - Mark R. Hughes, American entrepreneur (d. 2000)
  - Kōji Yakusho, Japanese actor
  - Christine Lagarde, French lawyer and politician, IMF Managing Director and ECB president
  - Dzulkefly Ahmad, Malaysian politician
  - Andrew Lesnie, Australian cinematographer (d. 2015)
  - Andy Gill, English musician (Gang of Four) (d. 2020)
- January 3 – Mel Gibson, American actor and director
- January 4 – Bernard Sumner, British musician
- January 5
  - Celso Blues Boy, Brazilian singer and guitarist (d. 2012)
  - Frank-Walter Steinmeier, German politician
- January 7
  - David Caruso, American actor
  - Uwe Ochsenknecht, German actor
  - Johnny Owen, Welsh boxer (d. 1980)
- January 8 – Anatolii Brezvin, Ukrainian businessman, politician, and ice hockey executive
- January 9
  - Kimberly Beck, American actress
  - Imelda Staunton, English actress and singer
- January 12 – Nikolai Noskov, Soviet and Russian rock singer and songwriter
- January 15 – Vitaly Kaloyev, Russian convicted murderer, architect deputy minister of construction of North Ossetia-Alania
- January 16 – Martin Jol, Dutch football manager
- January 17 – Paul Young, English musician
- January 18
  - Sharon Mitchell, American sexologist
  - Jim Mothersbaugh, American rock drummer
- January 19
  - Adriana Acosta, Argentine militant and field hockey player (d. 1978)
  - Susan Solomon, American atmospheric chemist
- January 20 – Bill Maher, American actor, comedian and political analyst
- January 21 – Geena Davis, American actress
- January 24 – Lounès Matoub, Algerian Berber Kabyle singer (d. 1998)
- January 27
  - Susanne Blakeslee, American actress
  - Mimi Rogers, American actress
- January 28 – Peter Schilling, German singer
- January 29 – Jan Jakub Kolski, Polish film director
- January 30 – Keiichi Tsuchiya, Japanese racing driver
- January 31
  - John Lydon, British punk musician and TV personality
  - Trevor Manuel, South African politician

=== February ===
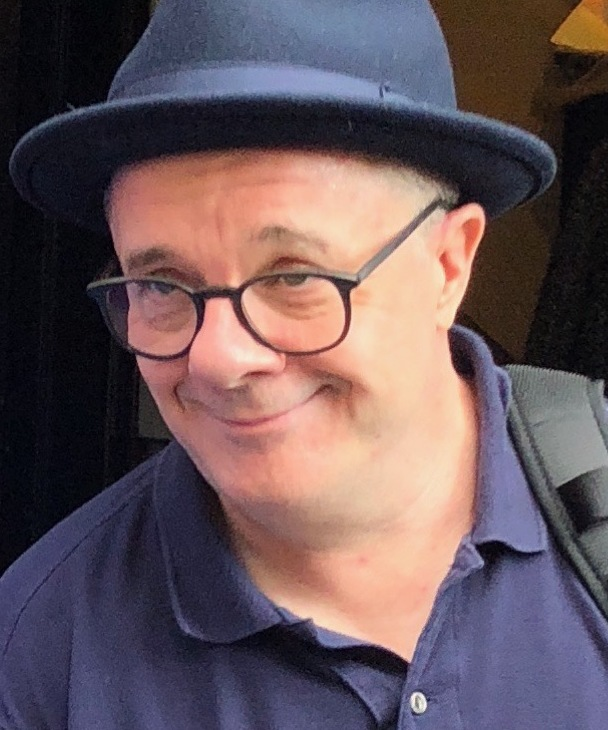
Nathan Lane

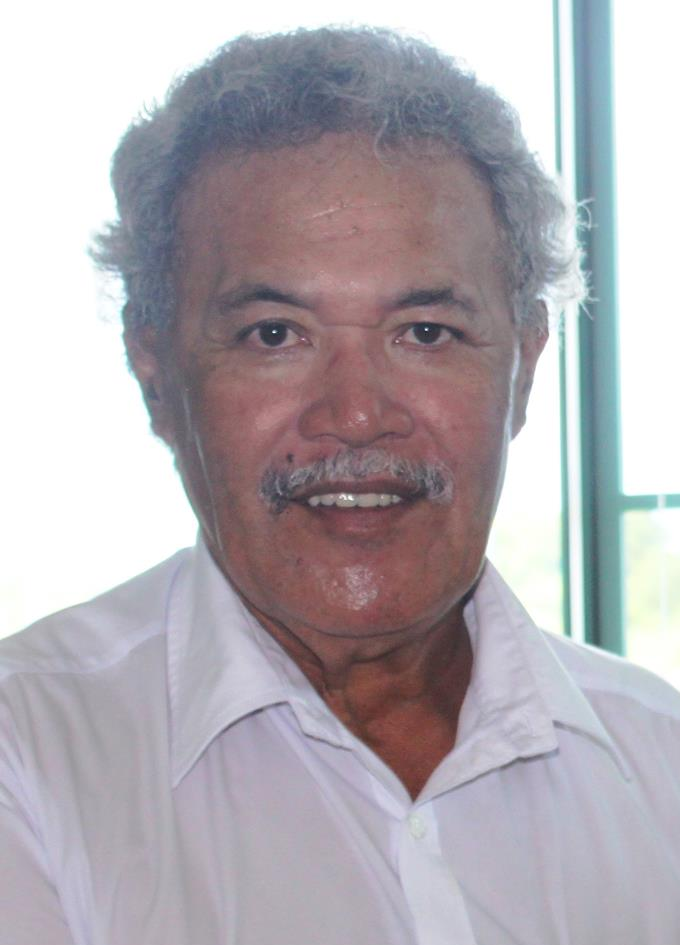
Enele Sopoaga

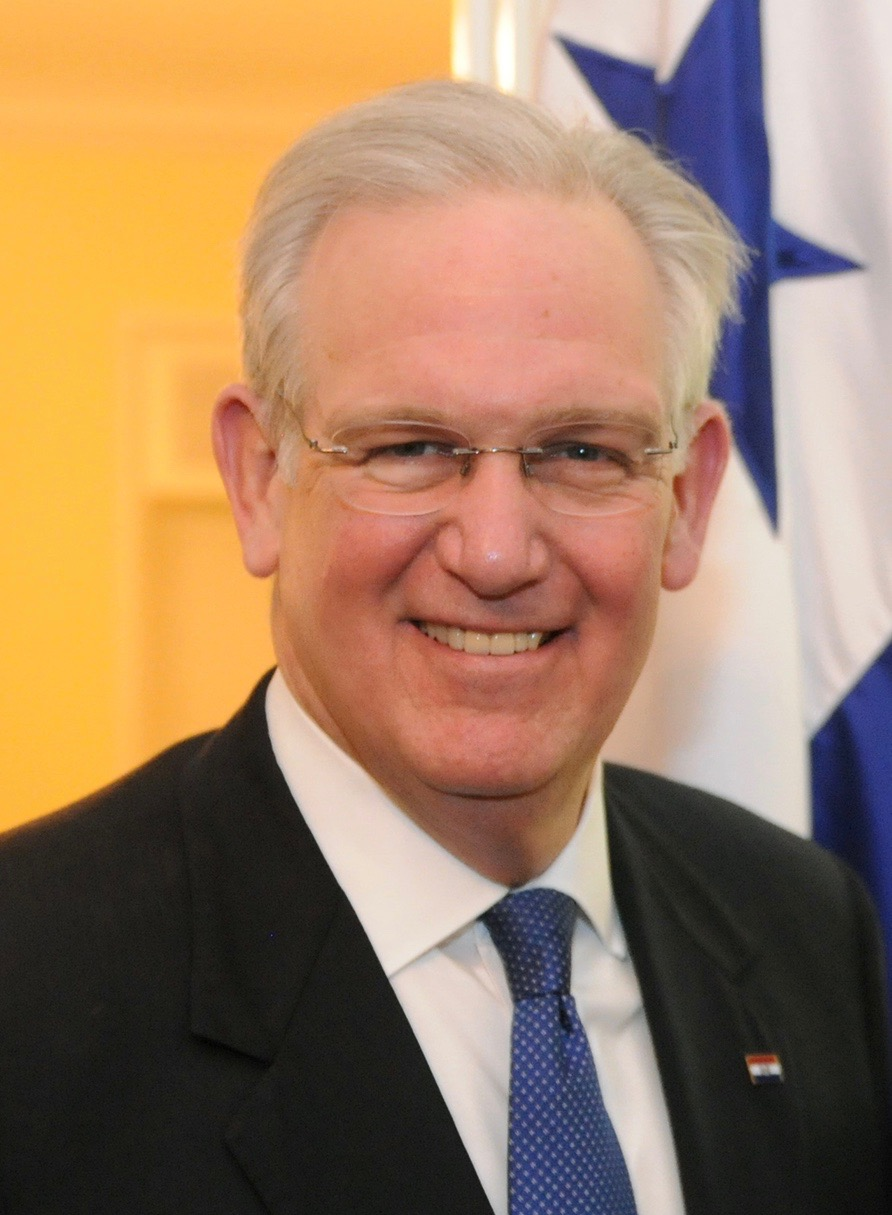
Jay Nixon

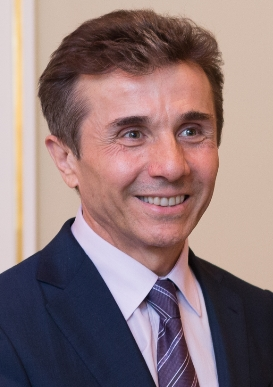
Bidzina Ivanishvili

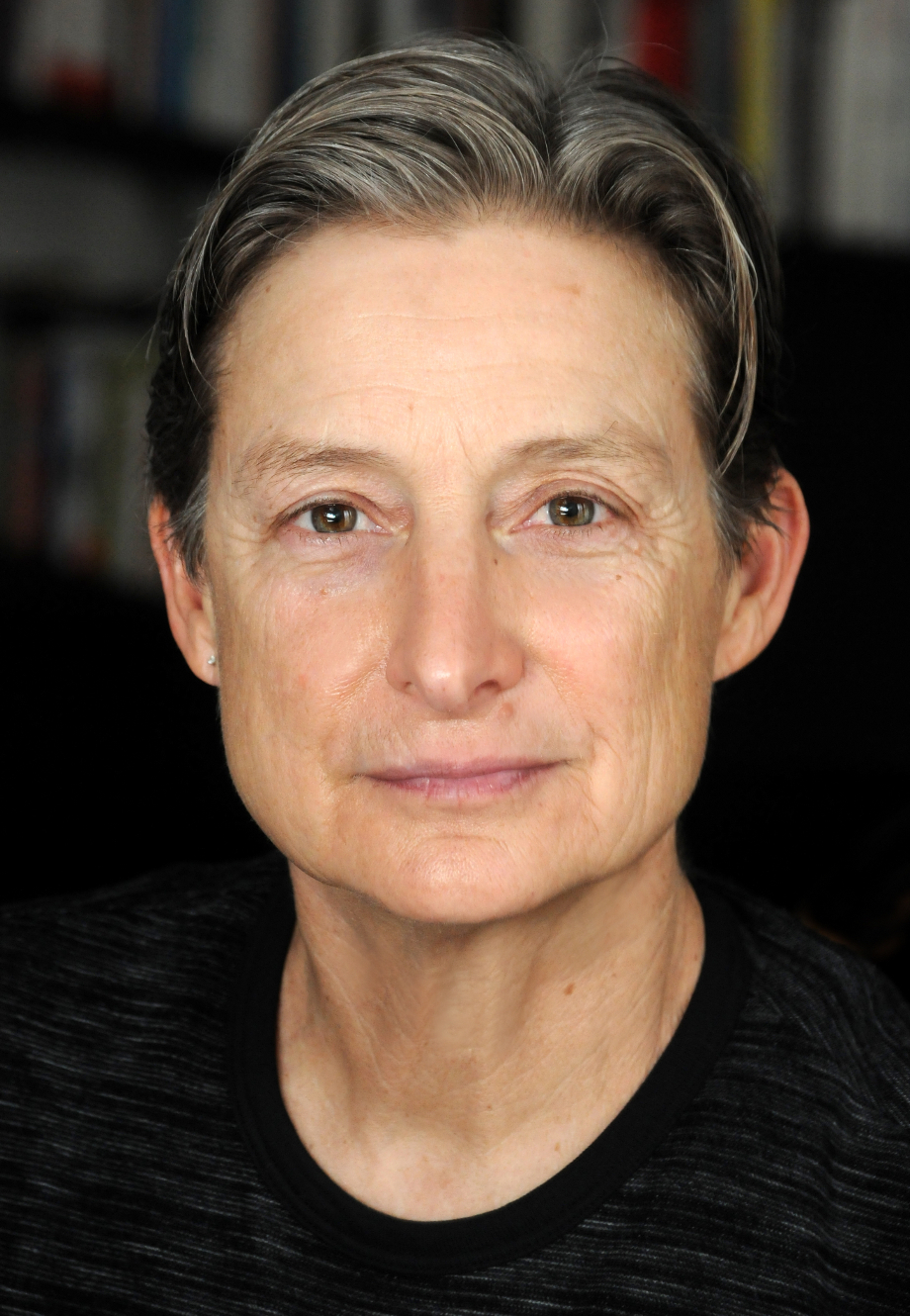
Judith Butler

- February 1 – Mike Kitchen, Canadian ice hockey player and coach
- February 2 – Alireza Soleimani, Iranian heavyweight freestyle wrestler (d. 2014)
- February 3 – Nathan Lane, American actor
- February 10 – Enele Sopoaga, 12th prime minister of Tuvalu
- February 11 – Didier Lockwood, French jazz violinist (d. 2018)
- February 13
  - Peter Hook, British bass player
  - Yiannis Kouros, Greek-Australian ultra marathoner
  - Jay Nixon, 55th governor of Missouri
- February 14 – Tom Burlinson, Australian actor
- February 15 – Desmond Haynes, West Indian cricketer
- February 18
  - Thomas Gradin, Swedish hockey player
  - Bidzina Ivanishvili, Georgian-French billionaire oligarch and politician
- February 19
  - Kathleen Beller, American actress
  - Roderick MacKinnon, American biologist, recipient of the Nobel Prize in Chemistry
- February 20 – François Bréda, Romanian essayist, poet, literary critic, literary historian, translator and theatrologist (d. 2018)
- February 23 – Reinhold Beckmann, German television presenter
- February 24 – Judith Butler, American philosopher
- February 25
  - Davie Cooper, Scottish footballer (d. 1995)
  - Michel Friedman, German lawyer, politician and talk show host
- February 26 – Keisuke Kuwata, Japanese musician
- February 28 – Thomas Remengesau Jr., 7th and 9th president of Palau
- February 29 – Aileen Wuornos, American serial killer (d. 2002)

=== March ===
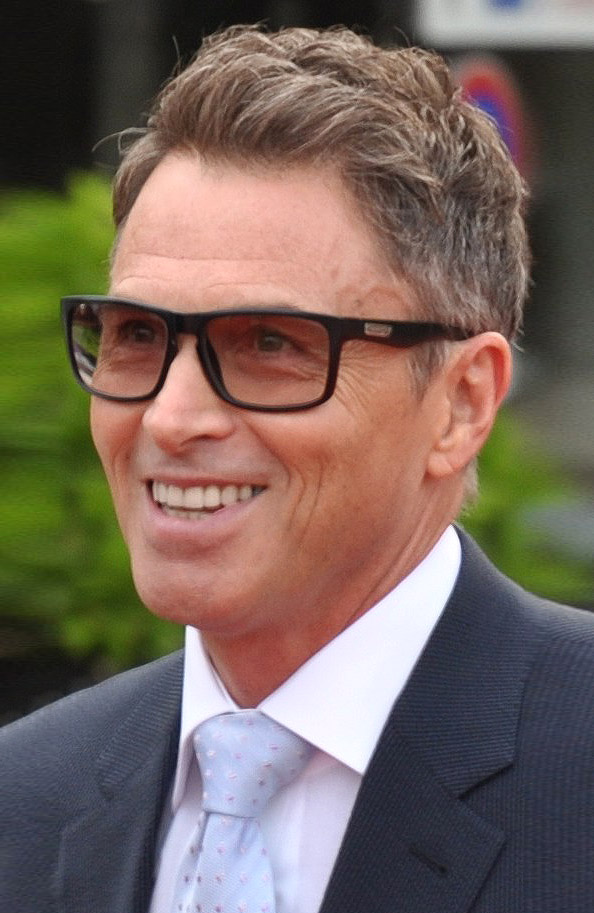
Tim Daly

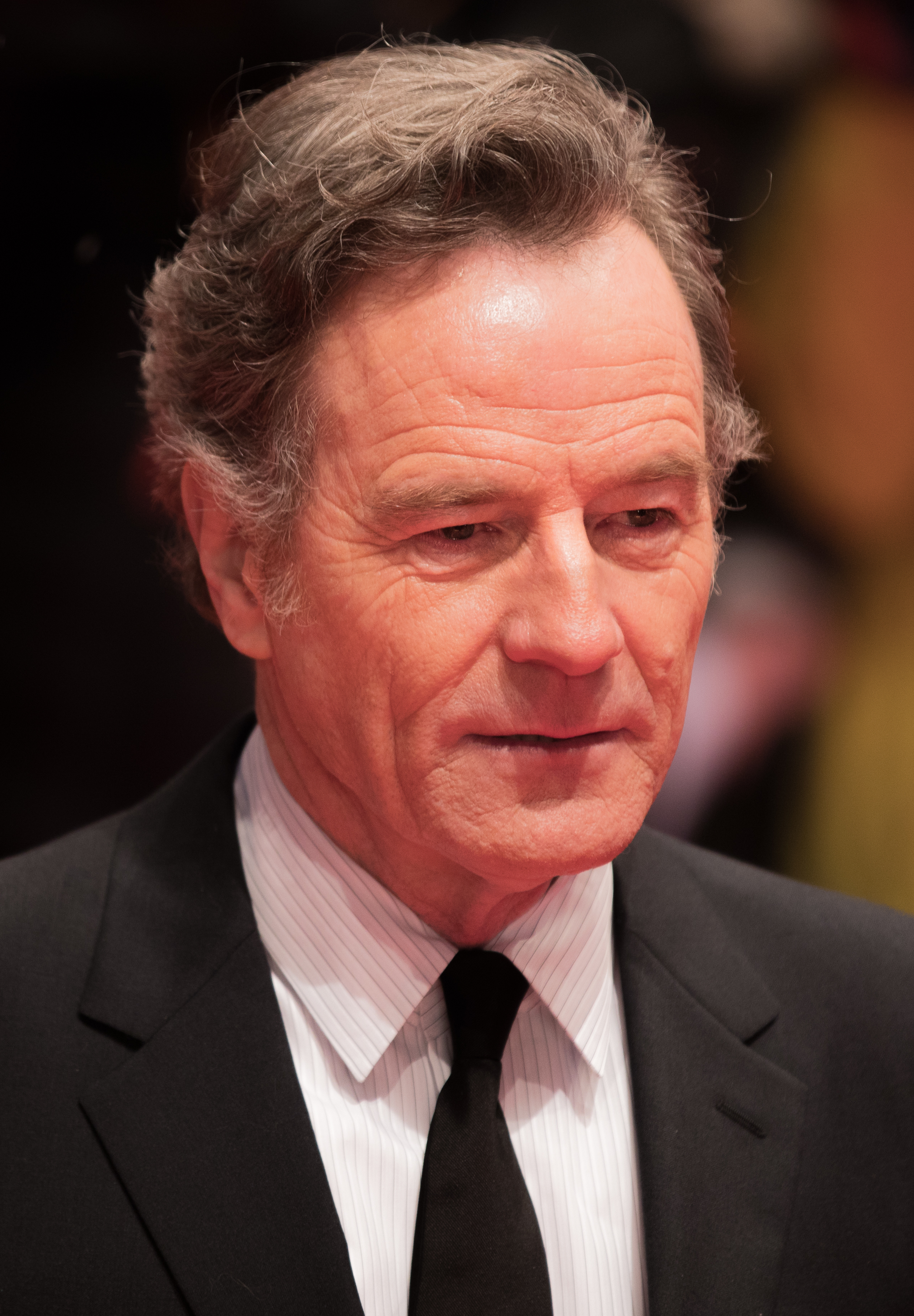
Bryan Cranston

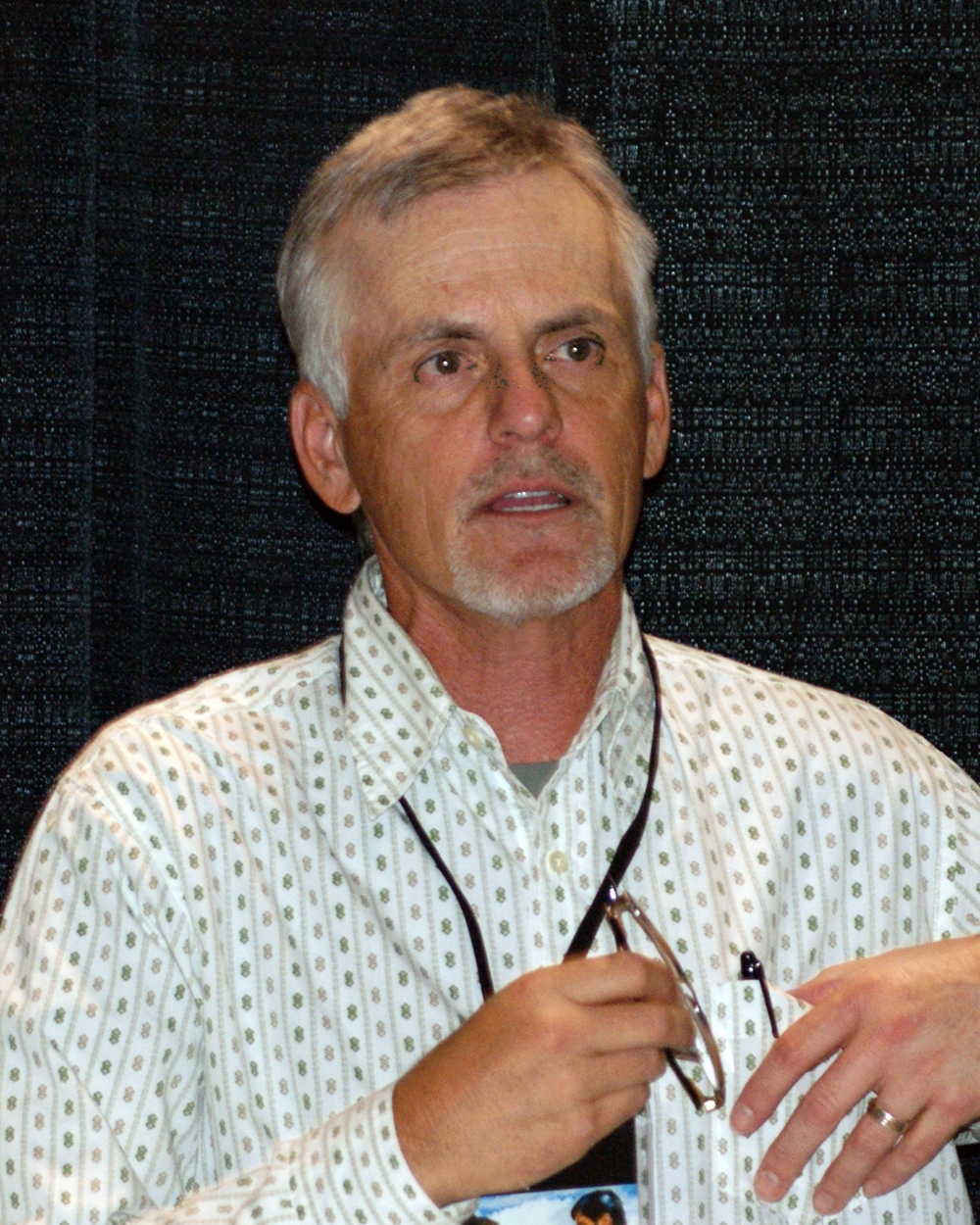
Rob Paulsen

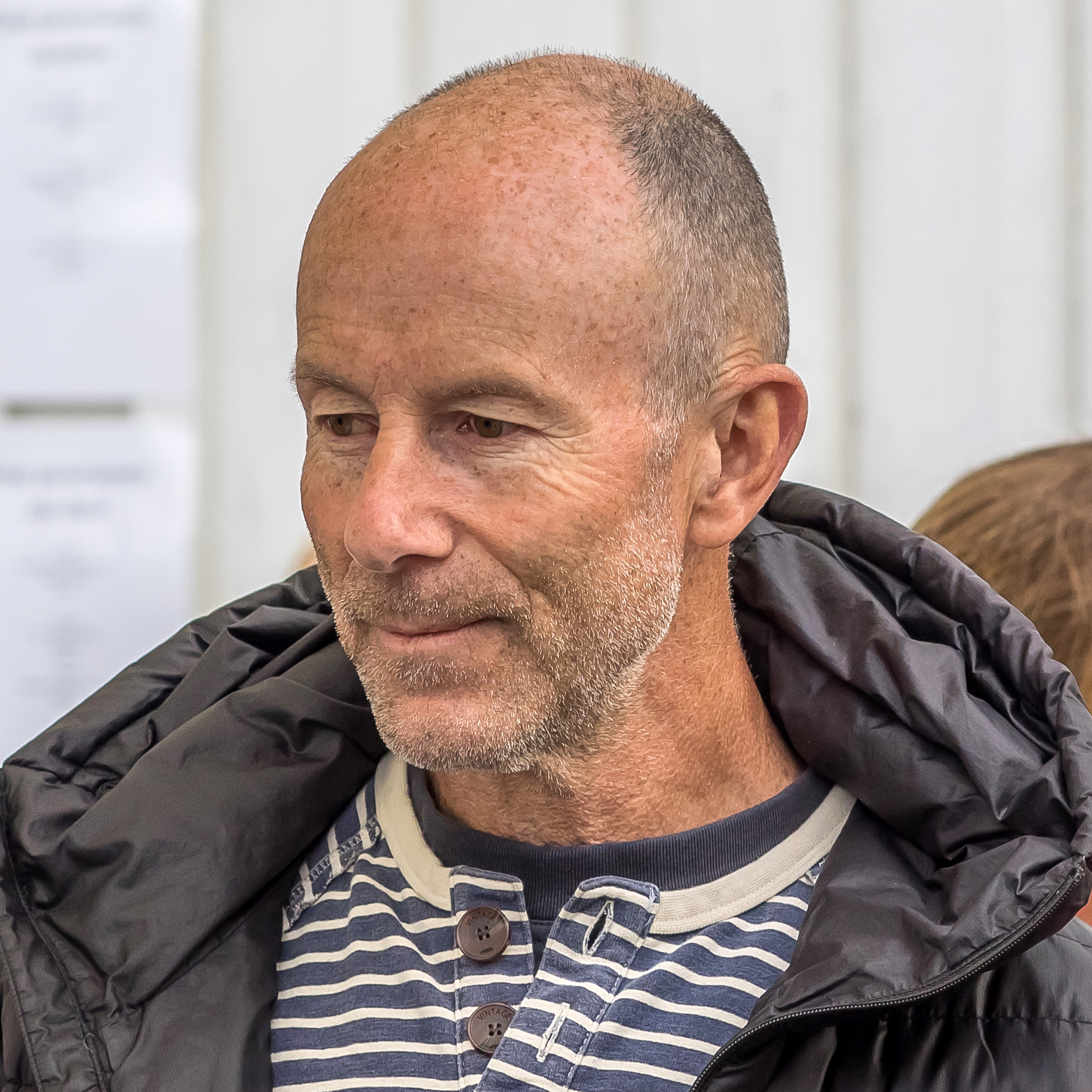
Ingemar Stenmark

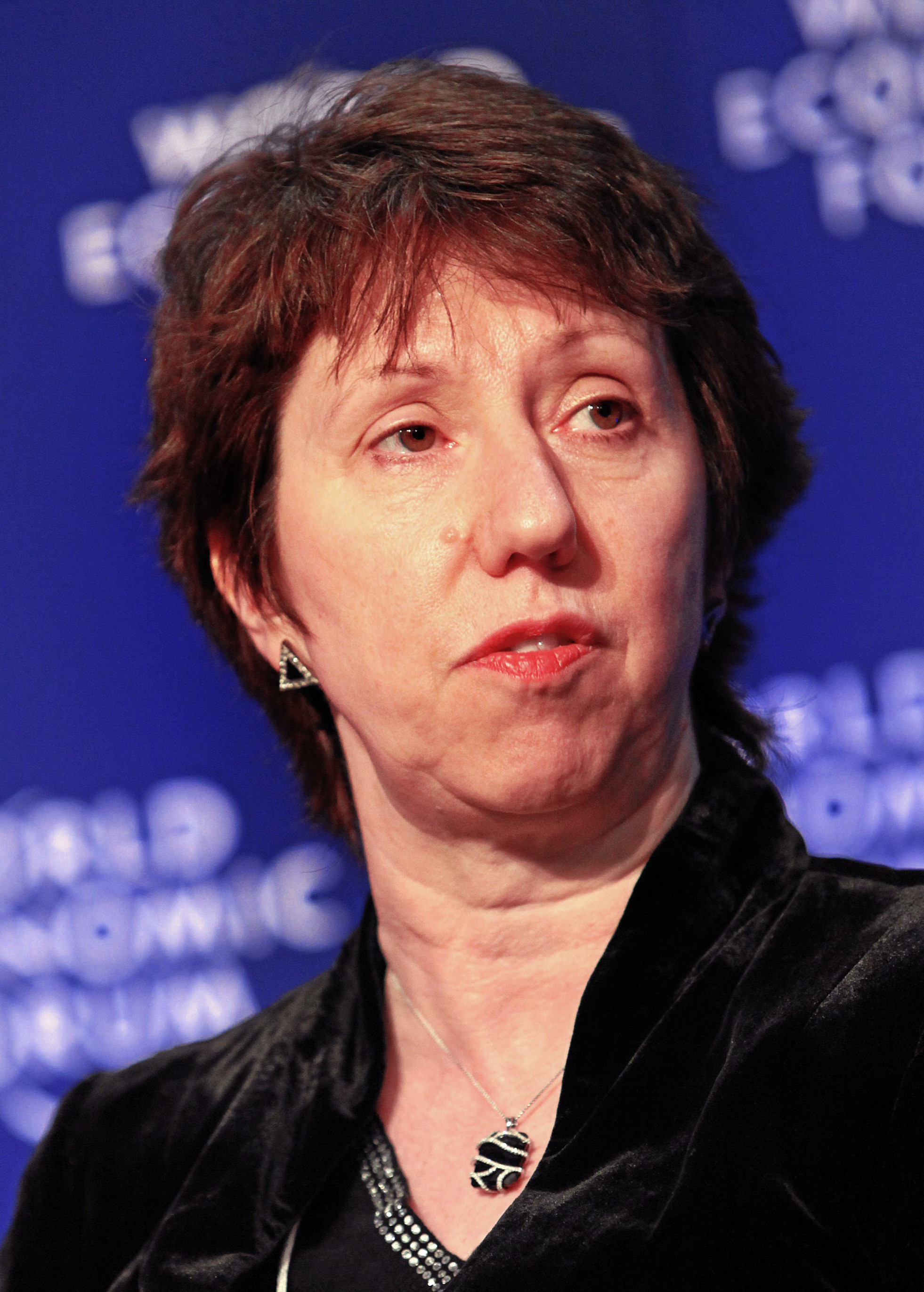
Catherine Ashton

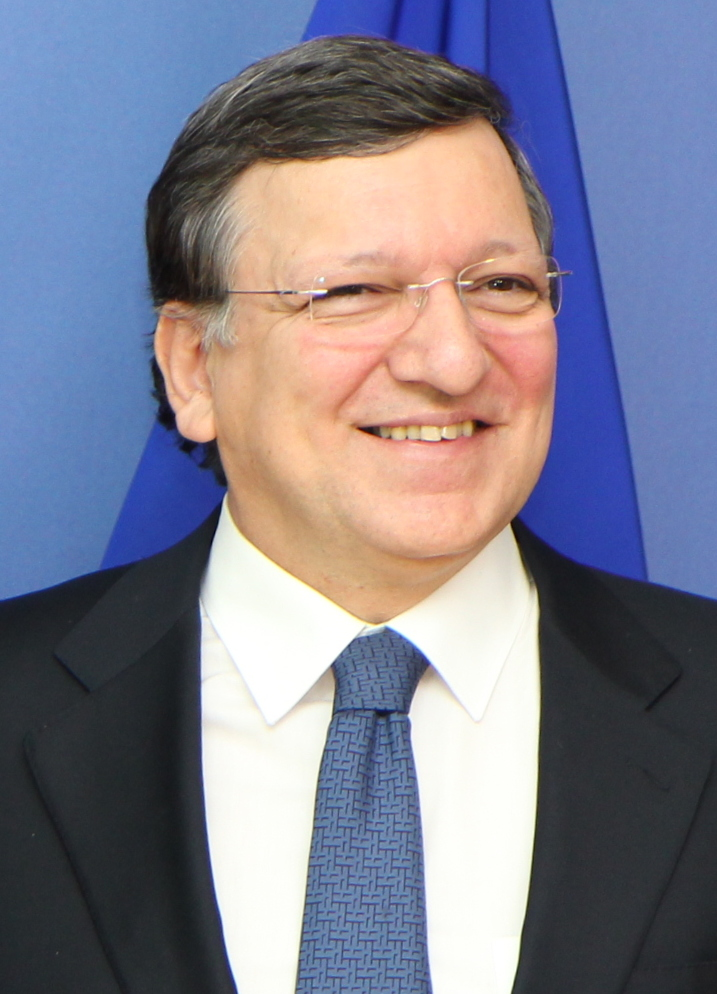
José Manuel Barroso

- March 1
  - Tim Daly, American actor and producer
  - Dalia Grybauskaitė, President of Lithuania
- March 2 – Eduardo Rodríguez, President of Bolivia
- March 5
  - Teena Marie, American singer (d. 2010)
  - Marco Paolini, Italian stage actor, dramaturge and author
- March 7
  - Andrea Levy, English novelist (d. 2019)
  - Bryan Cranston, American actor, director, producer and screenwriter
- March 9
  - Kadyrzhan Batyrov, Kyrgyz businessman and politician (d. 2018)
  - Shashi Tharoor, Indian politician
- March 10 – Prasanna Jayawardena, Sri Lankan puisne justice of the Supreme Court (d. 2019)
- March 11 – Rob Paulsen, American voice actor and singer
- March 13 – Dana Delany, American actress
- March 16
  - Boaz Arad, Israeli visual artist (d. 2018)
  - Vladimír Godár, Slovak composer
- March 18 – Ingemar Stenmark, Swedish alpine skier
- March 19 – Yegor Gaidar, Russian economist and politician (d. 2009)
- March 20
  - Minken Fosheim, Norwegian actress and author (d. 2018)
  - Catherine Ashton, British politician
  - Naoto Takenaka, Japanese actor, comedian, singer and director
  - José Manuel Barroso, Prime Minister of Portugal
  - Ingrid Kristiansen, Norwegian runner
- March 22
  - Ilana Kloss, South-African born tennis player, tennis coach, and commissioner of World Team Tennis
  - Maria Teresa, Grand Duchess of Luxembourg, consort of Grand Duke Henri
- March 24 – Steve Ballmer, American businessman, CEO of Microsoft (2000–2014), owner of the Los Angeles Clippers
- March 25 – Matthew Garber, English child actor (d. 1977)
- March 27 – Rose Dieng-Kuntz , Senegalese French computer scientist (d. 2008)
- March 28
  - Susan Ershler, American mountaineer
  - Evelin Jahl, German athlete
- March 29 - George McCaskey, American football executive, owner of the Chicago Bears
- March 30 – Paul Reiser, American actor

=== April ===
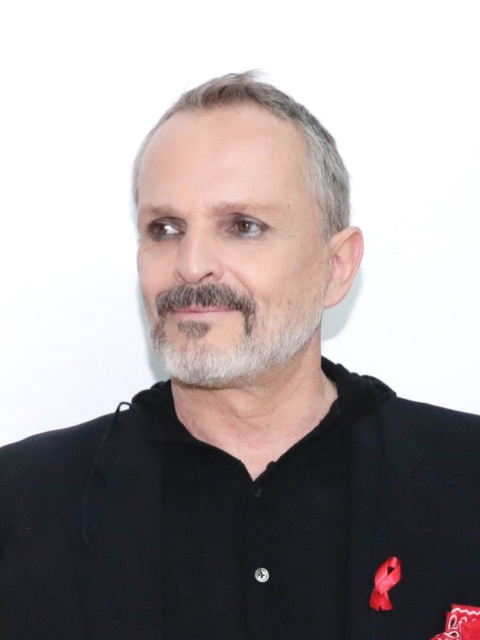
Miguel Bosé

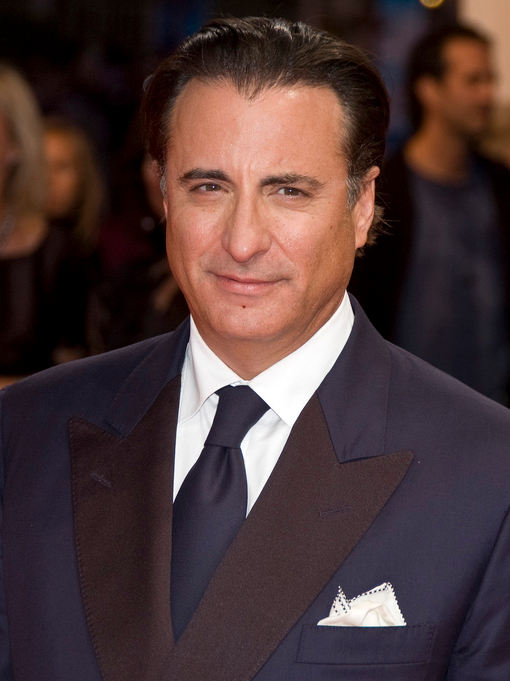
Andy García

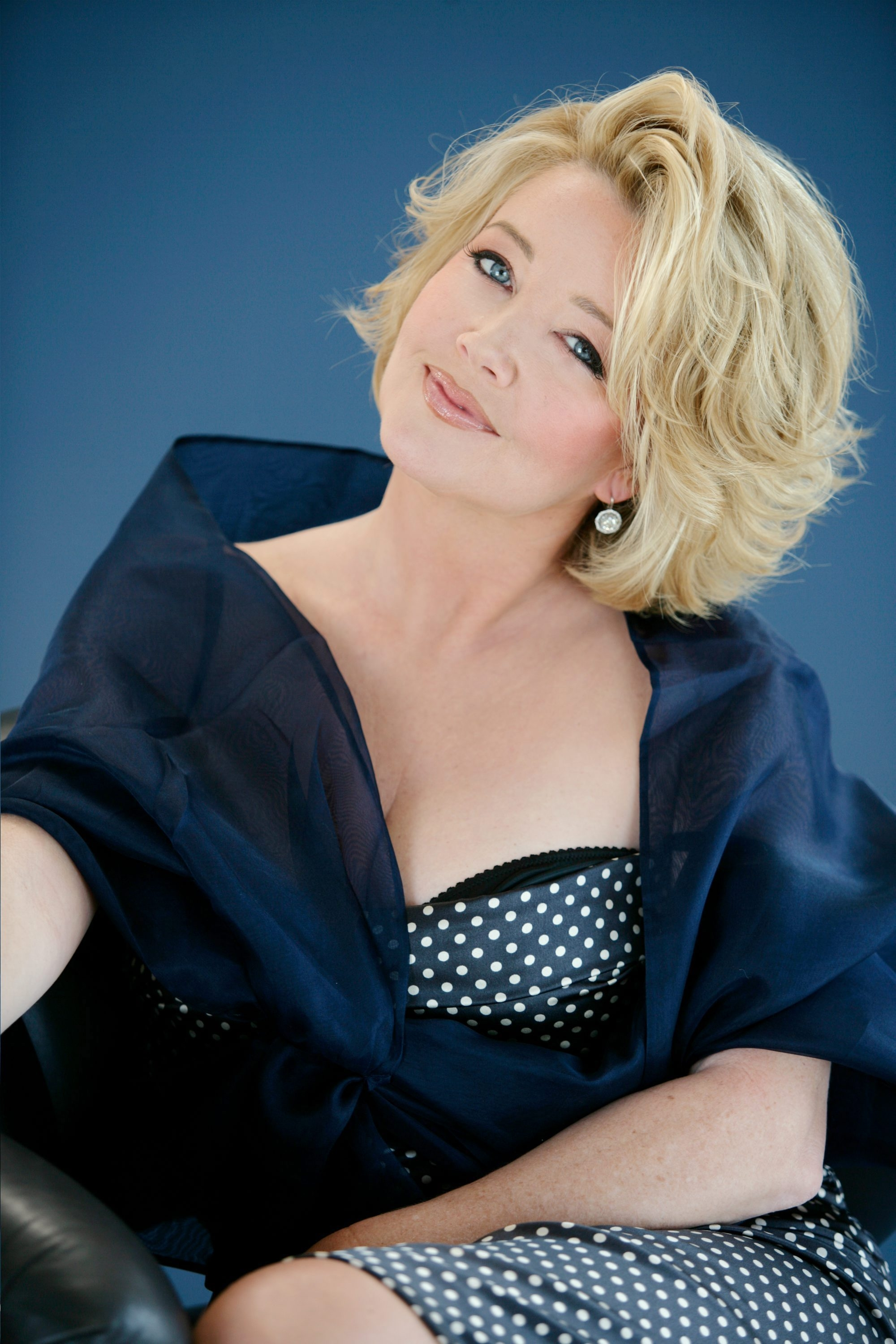
Melody Thomas Scott

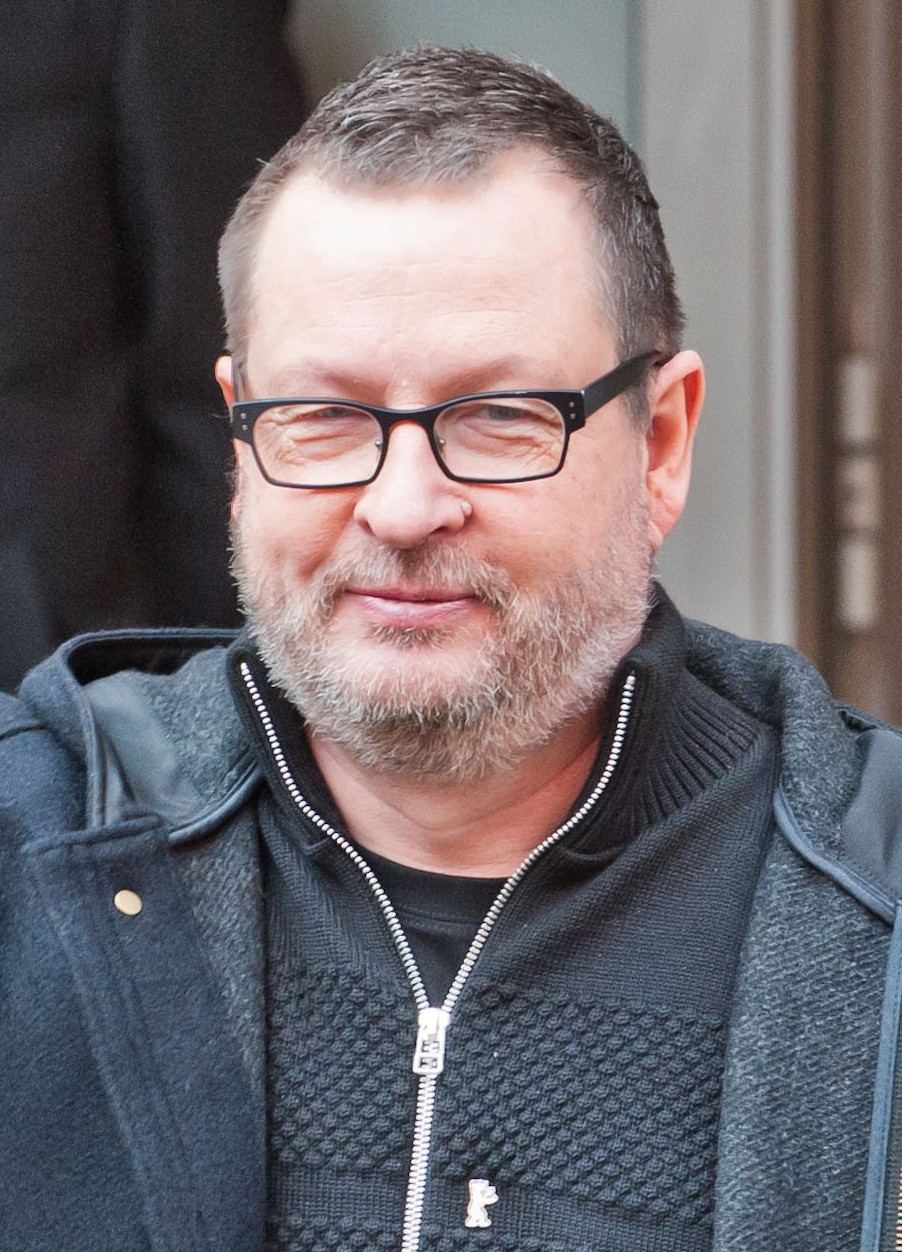
Lars von Trier

- April 3
  - Miguel Bosé, Panamanian-born musician and actor
  - Boris Miljković, Serbian TV & theatre director and video artist
- April 4
  - Kerry Chikarovski, Australian politician
  - David E. Kelley, American writer and television producer
- April 5
  - Diamond Dallas Page, American professional wrestler
  - El Risitas, Spanish comedian and actor (d. 2021)
- April 6
  - Sebastian Spreng, American-Argentinean visual artist
  - Dilip Vengsarkar, Indian cricketer
- April 7 – Christopher Darden, African-American attorney, author, actor and lecturer
- April 9 – Edmund Chong Ket Wah, Malaysian politician (d. 2010)
- April 12
  - Andy García, Cuban-American actor
  - Herbert Grönemeyer, German musician and actor
  - Yasuo Tanaka, Japanese politician, novelist
- April 14 – Barbara Bonney, American soprano
- April 16
  - David M. Brown, American astronaut (d. 2003)
  - Lise-Marie Morerod, Swiss skier
- April 18
  - Melody Thomas Scott, American actress
  - Karim Abdul Razak, Ghanaian footballer
  - Eric Roberts, American actor
- April 19 – Sue Barker, British tennis player and television presenter
- April 22 – Jukka-Pekka Saraste, Finnish conductor
- April 26 – Koo Stark, British actress
- April 28 – Hanka Paldum, Bosnian singer
- April 30 – Lars von Trier, Danish film director and screenwriter

=== May ===
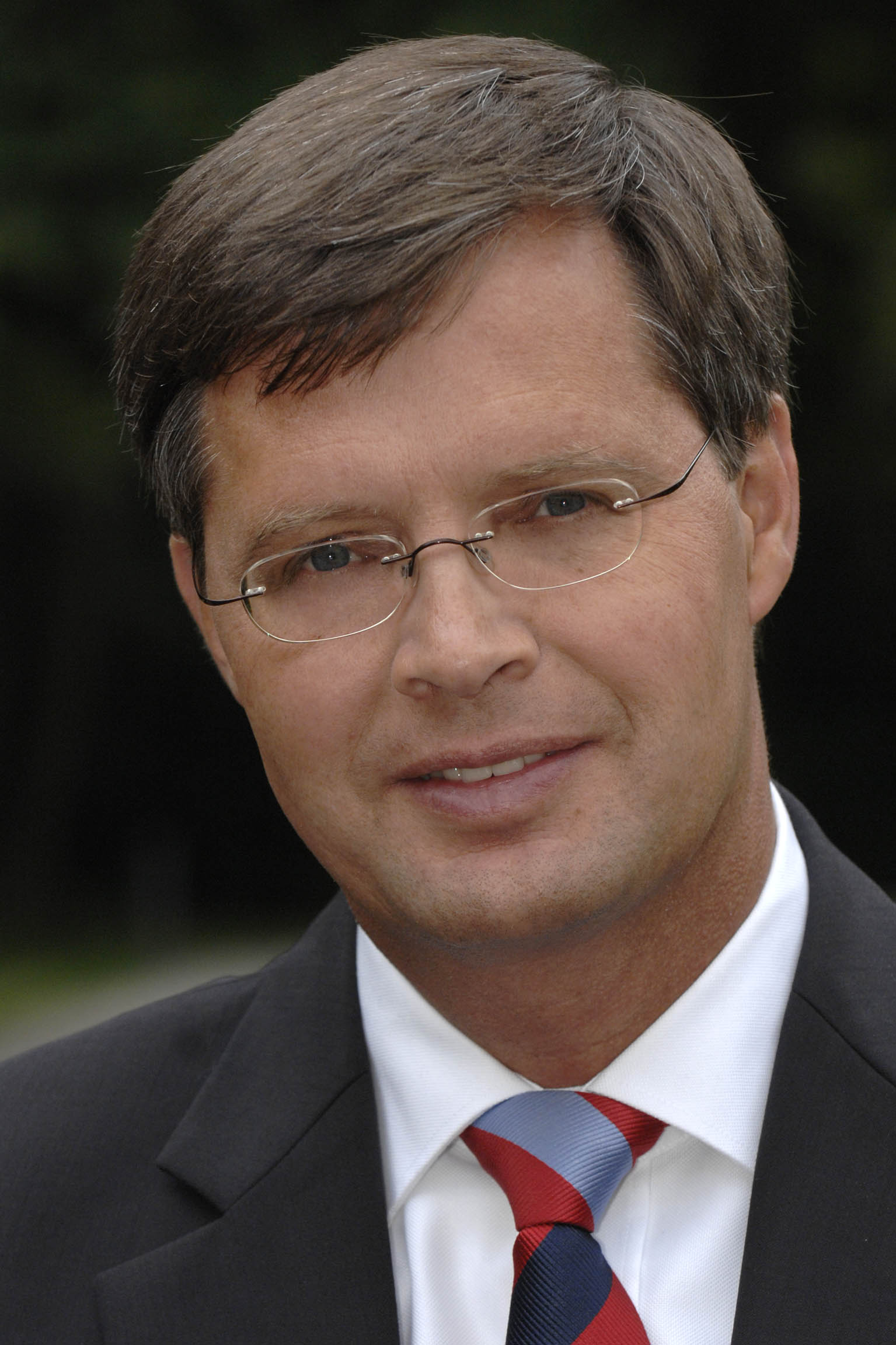
Jan Peter Balkenende

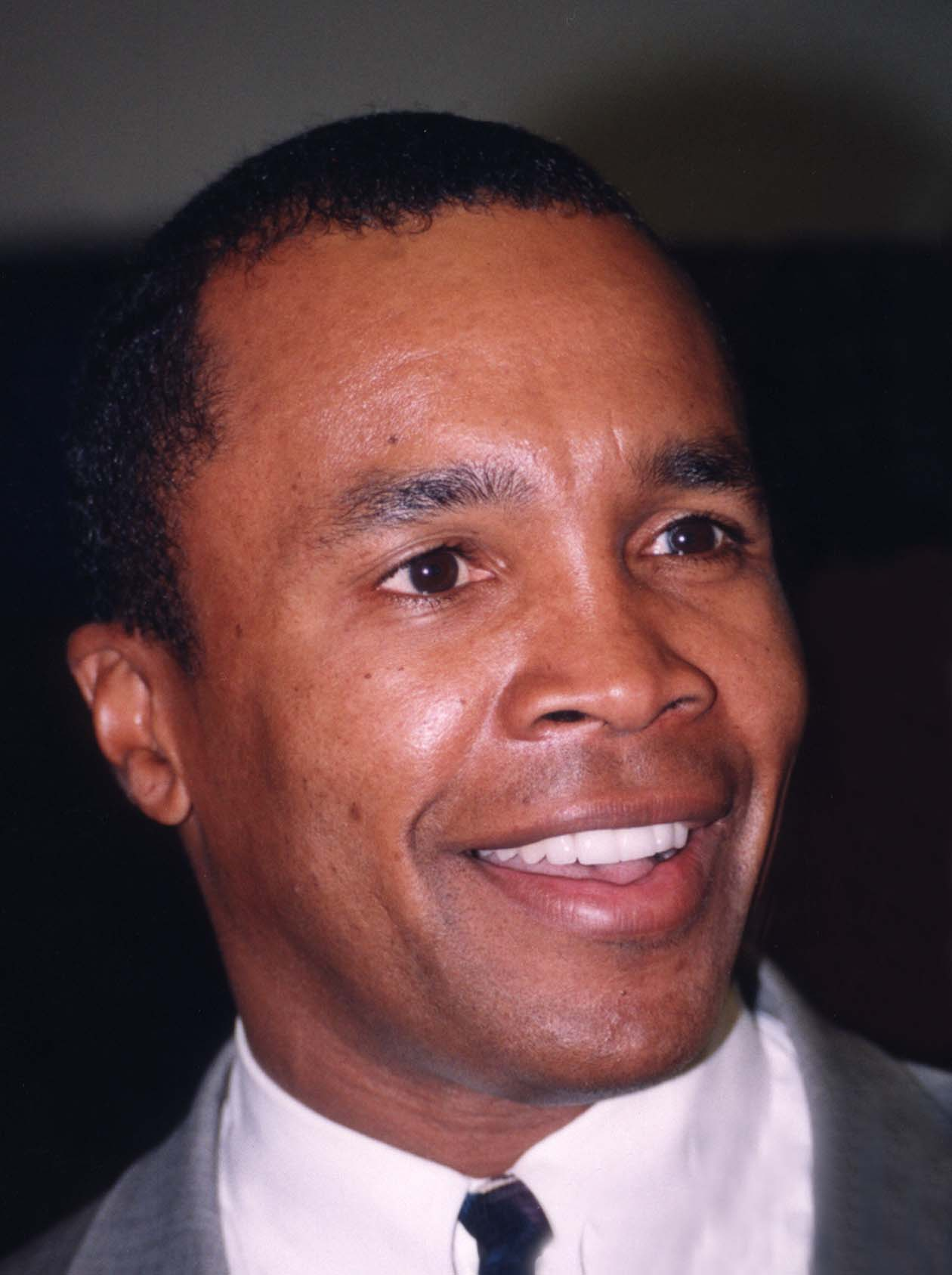
Sugar Ray Leonard

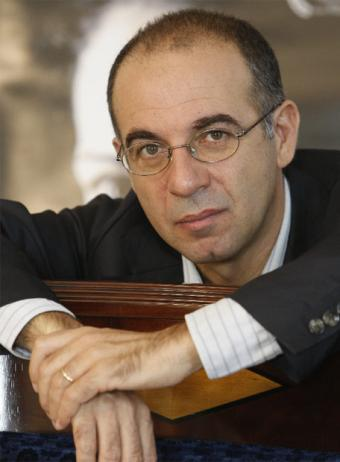
Giuseppe Tornatore

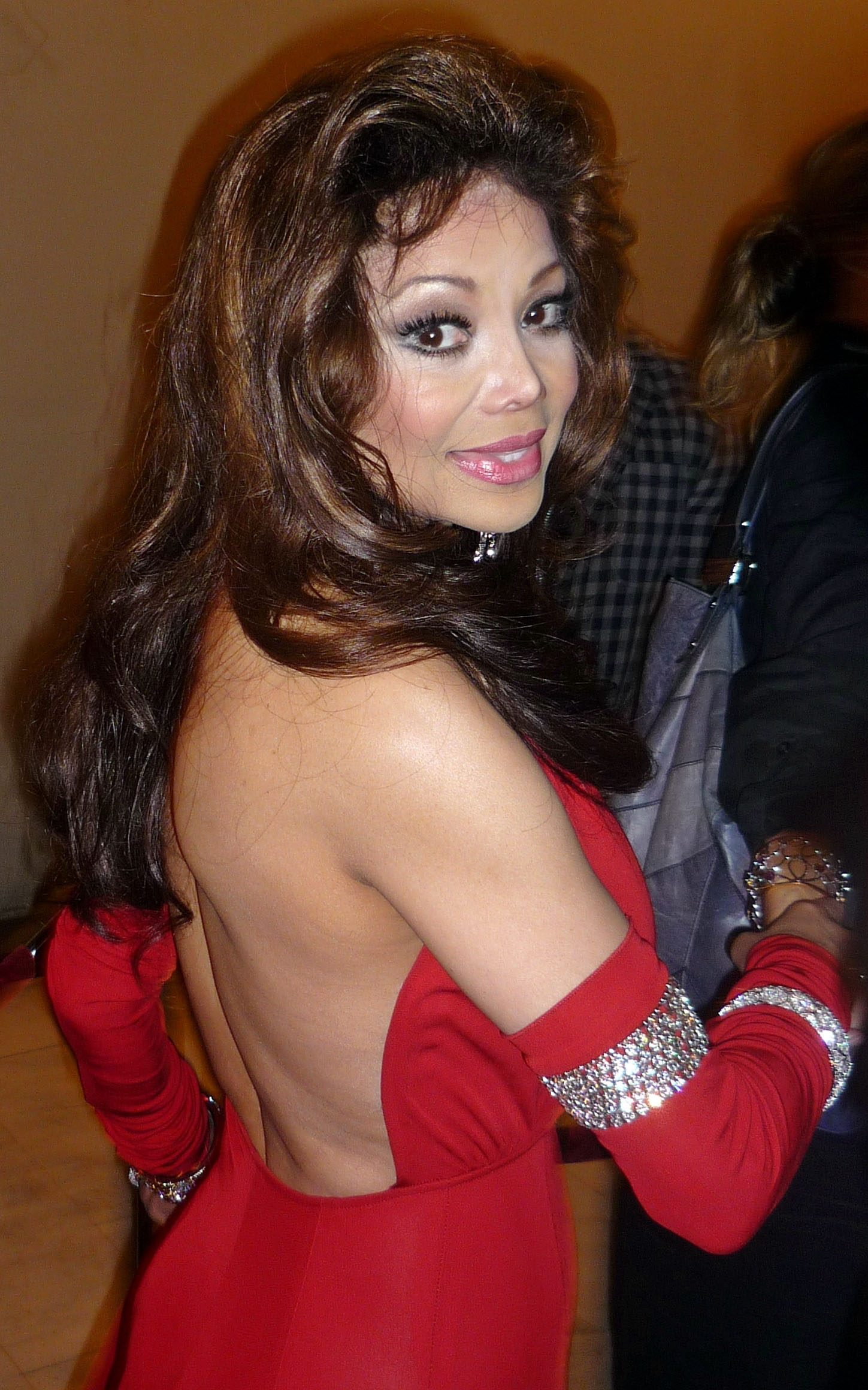
La Toya Jackson

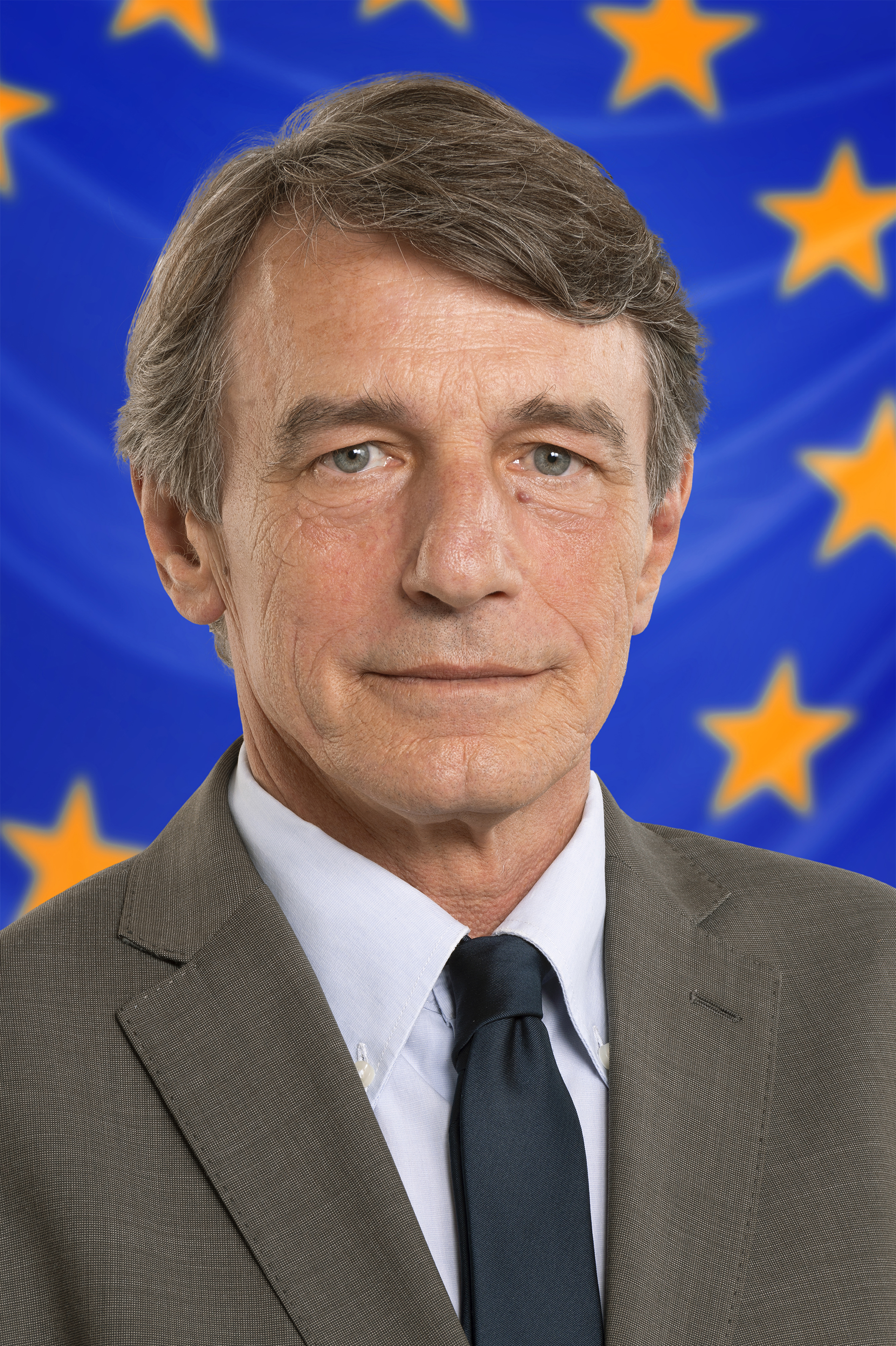
David Sassoli

- May 1 – Alexander Ivanov, Russian-born American chess grandmaster
- May 4
  - David Guterson, American writer
  - Sharon Jones, African-American singer (d. 2016)
  - Ulrike Meyfarth, German high jumper
- May 5 – Lisa Eilbacher, American actress
- May 6 – Vladimir Lisin, Russian business oligarch
- May 7
  - S. Scott Bullock, American actor and voice actor
  - Jan Peter Balkenende, Prime Minister of the Netherlands (2002–2010)
  - Jean Lapierre, Canadian politician and television host (d. 2016)
- May 9
  - Frank Andersson, Swedish wrestler (d. 2018)
  - Wendy Crewson, Canadian actress
- May 10
  - Mickey Faerch, Danish-Canadian burlesque dancer and actress
  - Vladislav Listyev, Russian journalist (d. 1995)
  - Paige O'Hara, American actress, voice actress, singer and painter
  - Bikenibeu Paeniu, 2-Time Prime Minister of Tuvalu
- May 12 – Jānis Bojārs, Latvian shot putter (d. 2018)
- May 13
  - Kenneth Eriksson, Swedish rally driver
  - Sri Sri Ravi Shankar, Indian guru
  - Mirek Topolánek, 7th prime minister of the Czech Republic
  - Kirk Thornton, American voice actor
- May 15 – Dan Patrick, American sports commentator
- May 17
  - Cheenu Mohan, Indian actor (d. 2018)
  - Sugar Ray Leonard, American boxer, motivational speaker and actor
- May 19 – Steven Ford, American actor
- May 20
  - Boris Akunin, Russian novelist and essayist
  - Dean Butler, American actor and producer
- May 23
  - Ursula Plassnik, Austrian politician
  - Buck Showalter, American baseball player and manager
- May 26 – Lisa Niemi, American actress and dancer
- May 27 – Giuseppe Tornatore, Italian film director
- May 28
  - Jerry Douglas, American dobro player
  - John O'Donoghue, Irish Fianna Fáil politician
  - Sayuri Yamauchi, Japanese voice actress (d. 2012)
- May 29 – La Toya Jackson, American singer, songwriter, actress, businesswoman and television personality
- May 30 – David Sassoli, 16th president of the European Parliament (d. 2022)
- May 31 – Yoshiko Sakakibara, Japanese voice actress

=== June ===
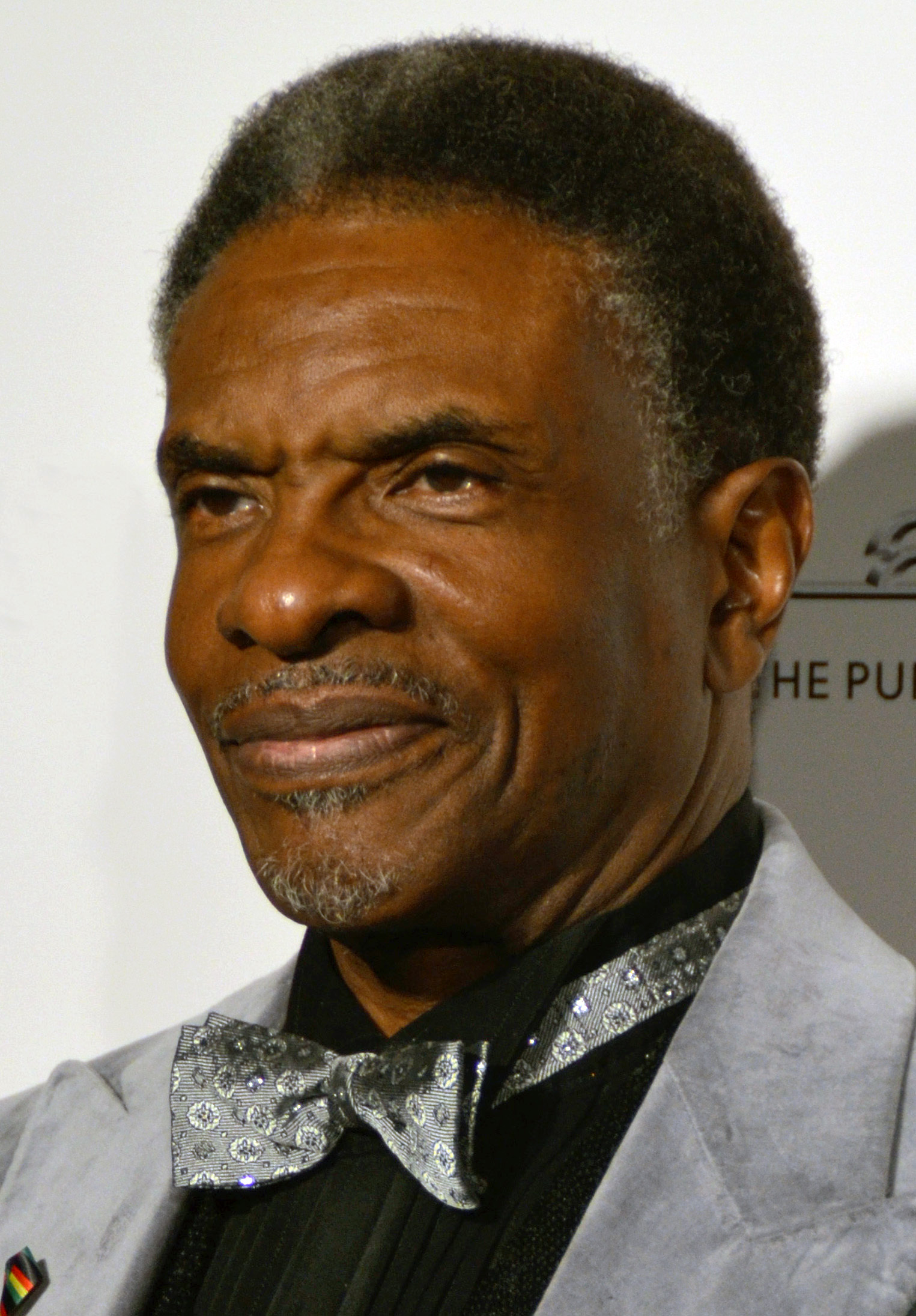
Keith David

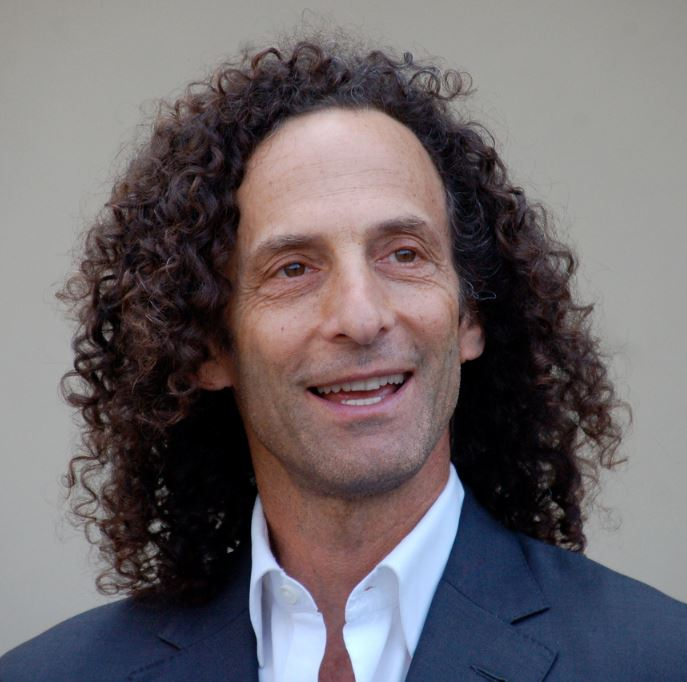
Kenny G

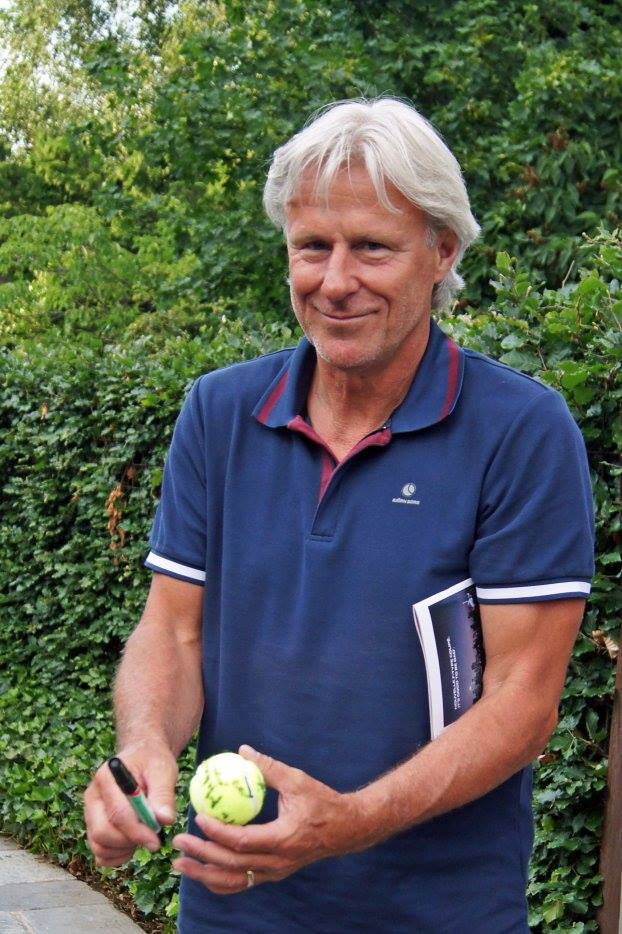
Björn Borg

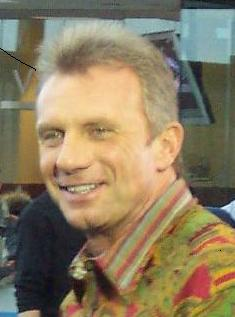
Joe Montana

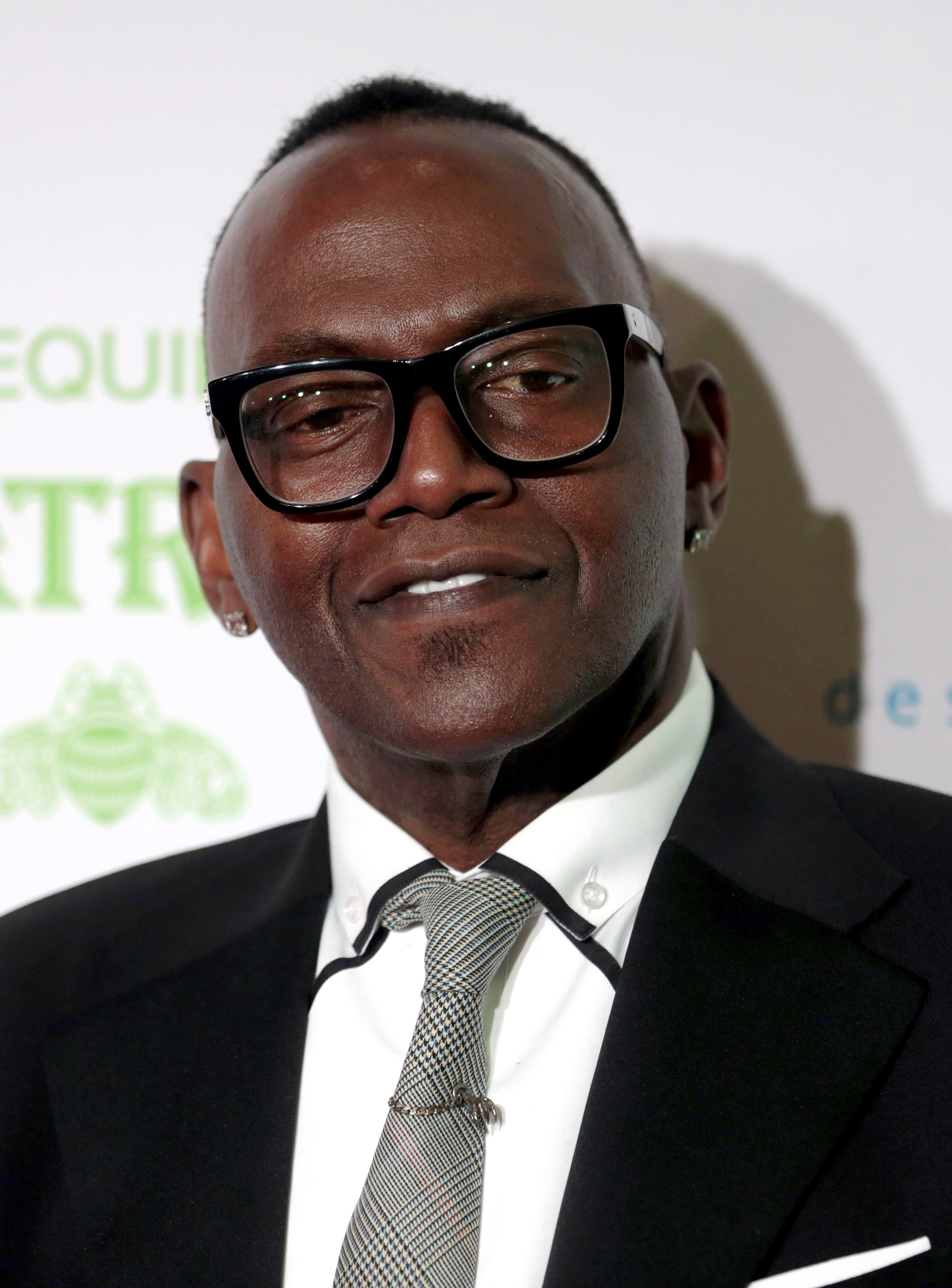
Randy Jackson

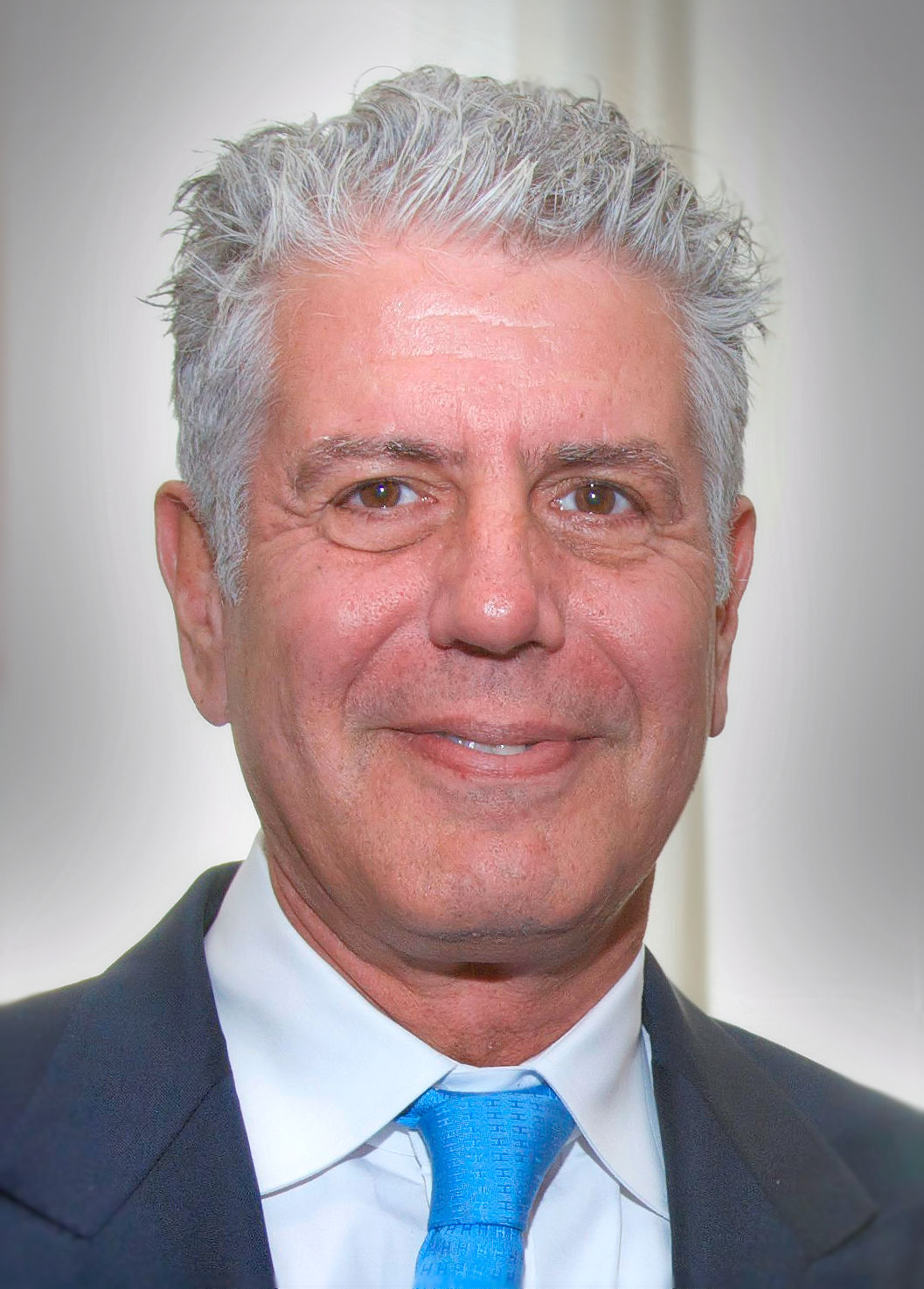
Anthony Bourdain

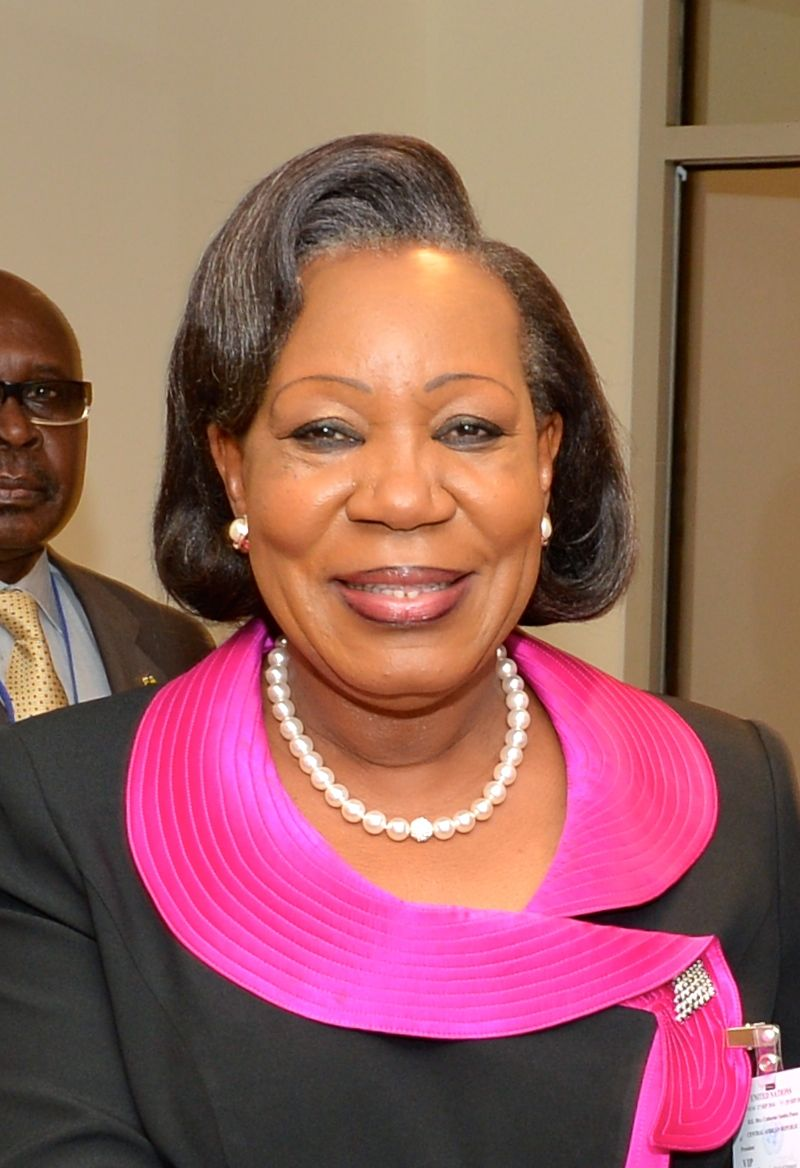
Catherine Samba-Panza

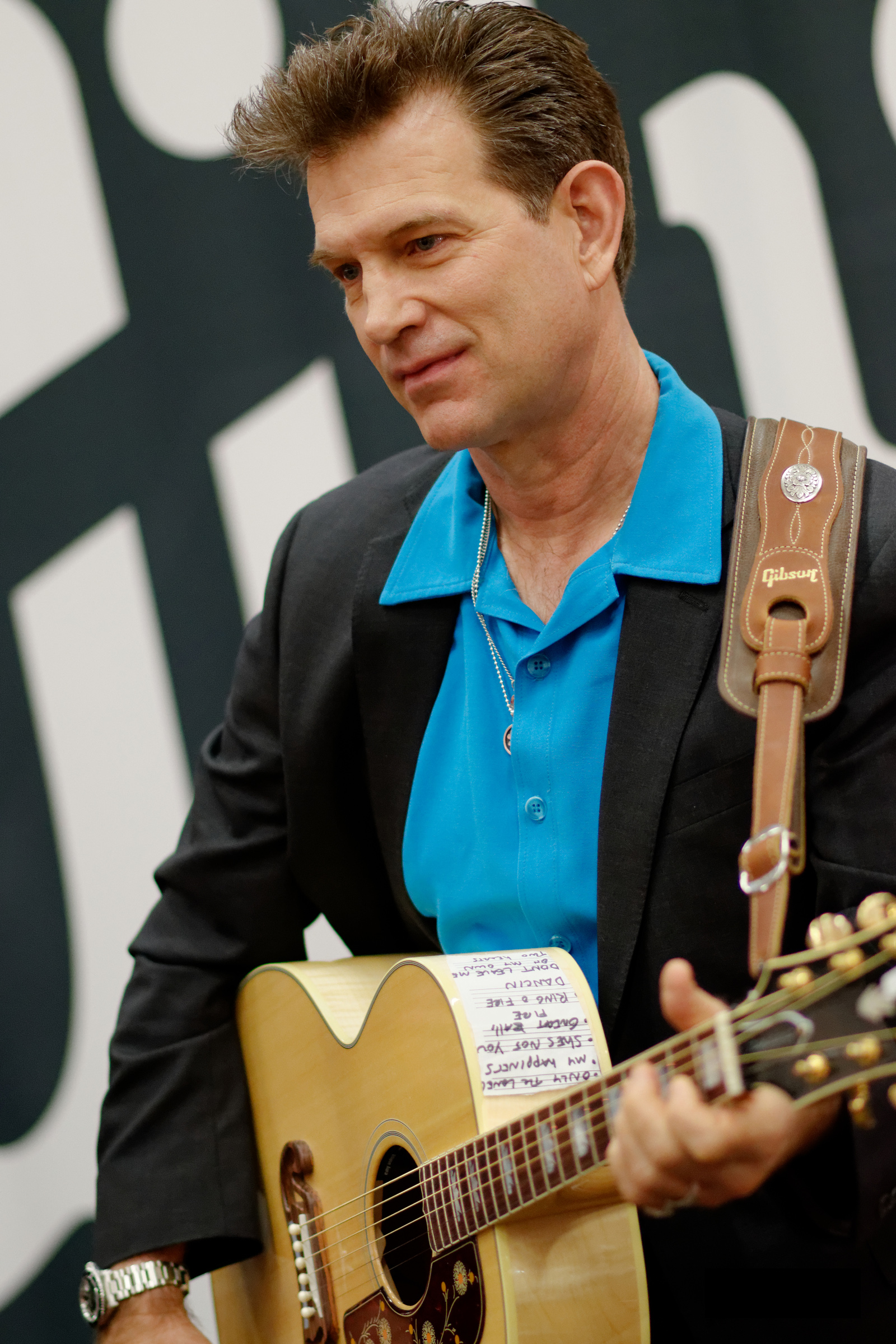
Chris Isaak

- June 1
  - Chintaman Vanaga, Indian politician (d. 2018)
  - Peter Tomka, Judge, International Court of Justice
- June 3 – George Burley, Scottish football manager
- June 4 – Keith David, African-American actor and voice actor
- June 5 – Kenny G, American saxophonist
- June 6
  - Yuri Shundrov, Russian-Ukrainian ice hockey goaltender (d. 2018)
  - Christopher Adamson, British actor
  - Björn Borg, Swedish tennis player
- June 7
  - Paul Sherwen, English racing cyclist and broadcaster (d. 2018)
  - Antonio M. Reid, American record executive
- June 8 – Péter Besenyei, Hungarian pilot
- June 9 – Patricia Cornwell, American novelist
- June 10 – Borwin, Duke of Mecklenburg, German head of the House of Mecklenburg
- June 11
  - Joe Montana, American football player
  - Arthur Porter, Canadian physician (d. 2015)
- June 13 – Yurik Vardanyan, Soviet weightlifter (d. 2018)
- June 14 – King Diamond, Danish heavy metal musician
- June 19 – Sergio Fajardo, Colombian politician<, Governor of Antioquia (2012-2016)
- June 20 – Cho Chikun, Korean Go player
- June 22
  - Abdulbaset Sieda, Kurdish-Syrian academic and politician
  - François Hadji-Lazaro, French actor and musician
- June 23 – Randy Jackson, African-American musician and talent judge
- June 24 – Turid Leirvoll, Norwegian-Danish politician
- June 25
  - Isabel de Navarre, German figure skating coach
  - Boris Trajkovski, President of the Republic of Macedonia (d. 2004)
  - Anthony Bourdain, American chef, writer and television personality (d. 2018)
  - Chloe Webb, American actress and singer
- June 26
  - Catherine Samba-Panza, President of the Central African Republic
  - Chris Isaak, American musician
- June 27
  - Sultan bin Salman Al Saud, Royal Saudi Air Force pilot
  - Heiner Dopp, German field hockey player
- June 30
  - Sun Chanthol, Cambodian politician
  - David Alan Grier, African-American actor and comedian

=== July ===
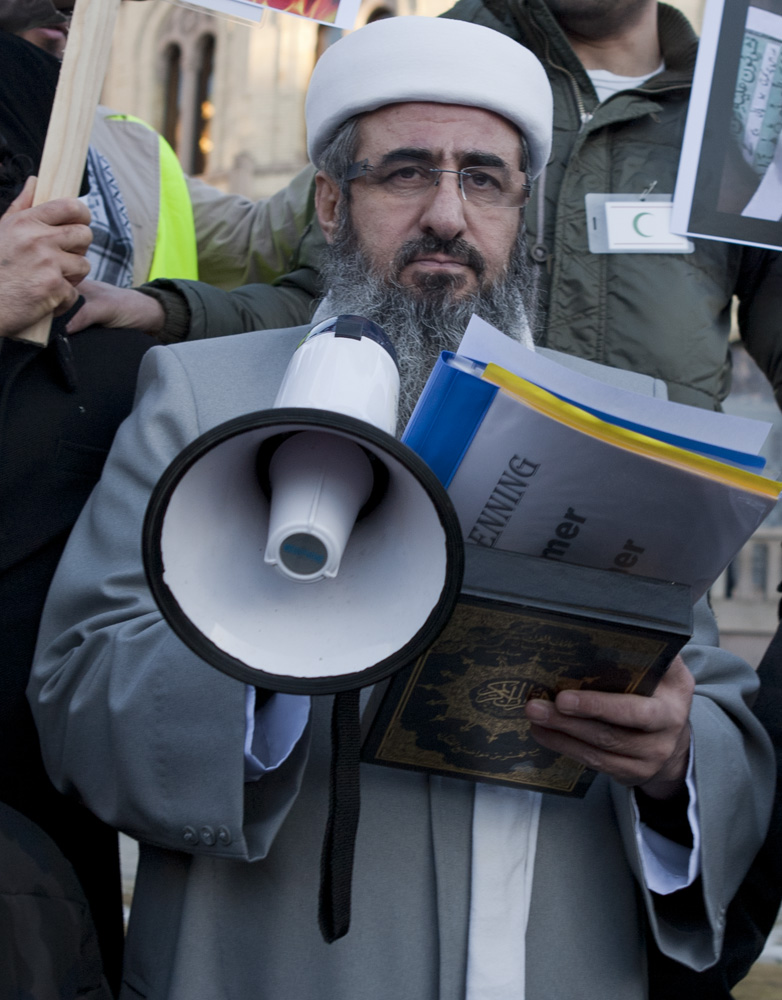
Mullah Krekar

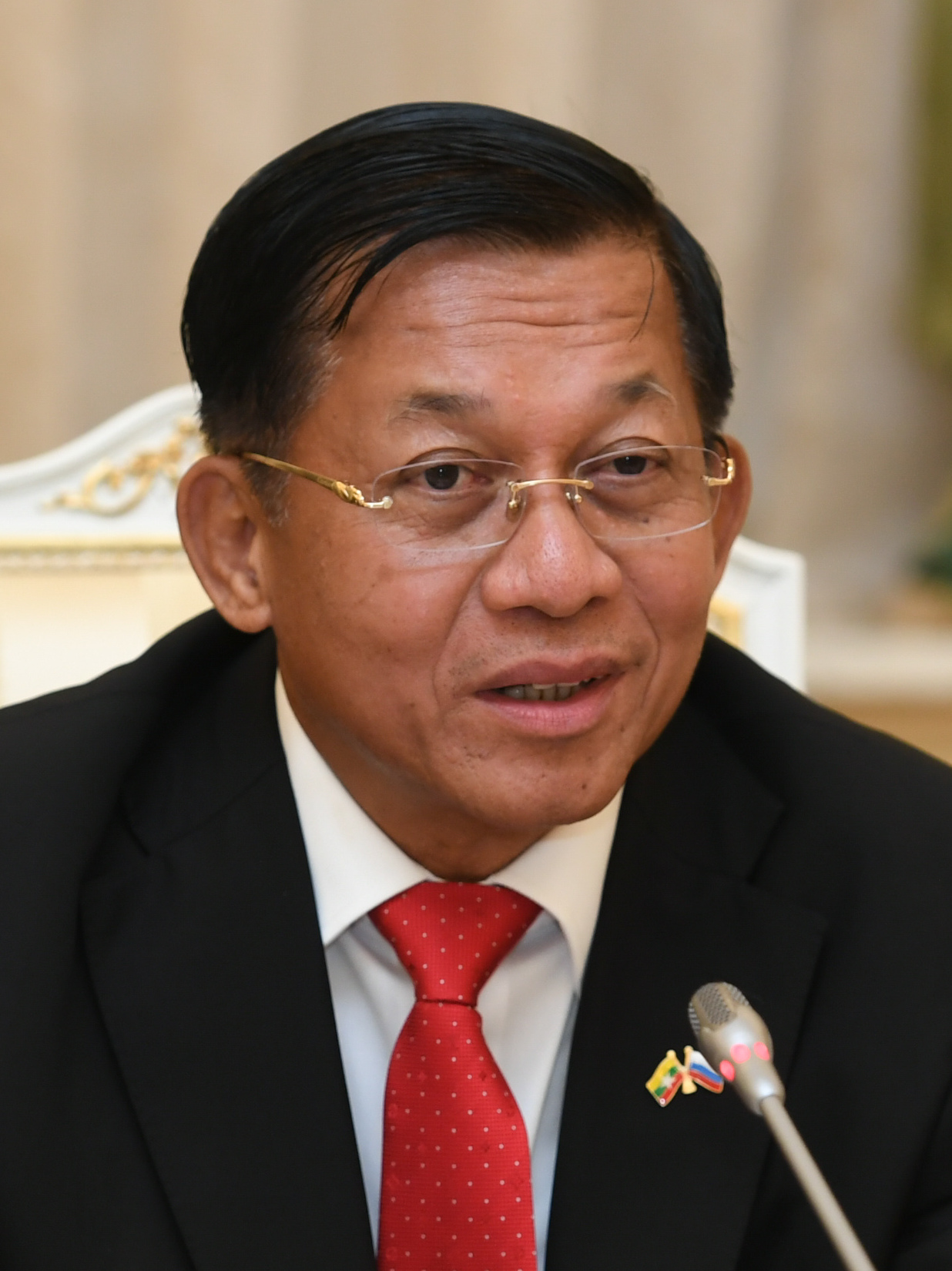
Min Aung Hlaing

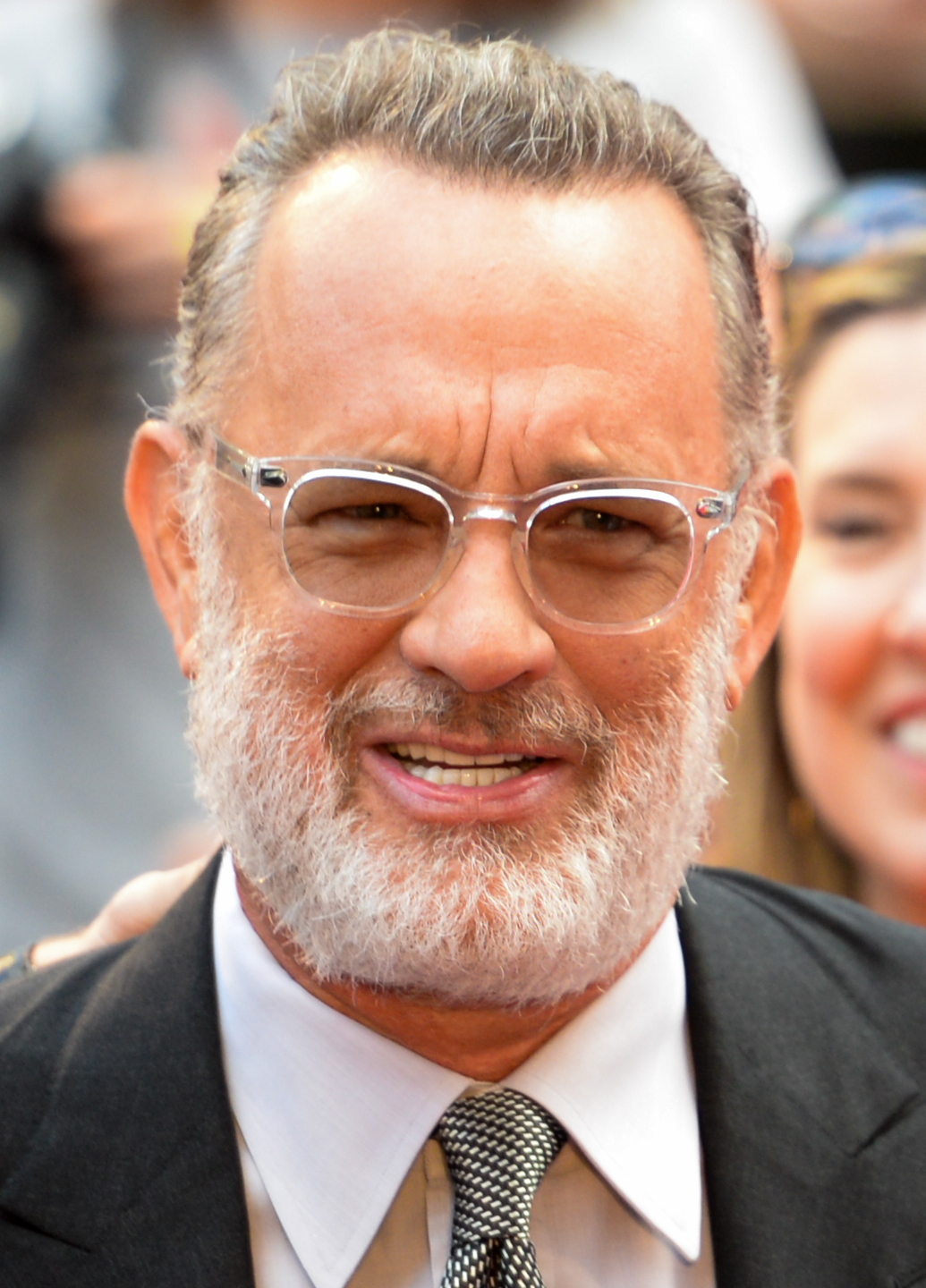
Tom Hanks

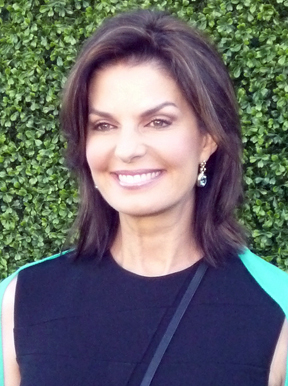
Sela Ward

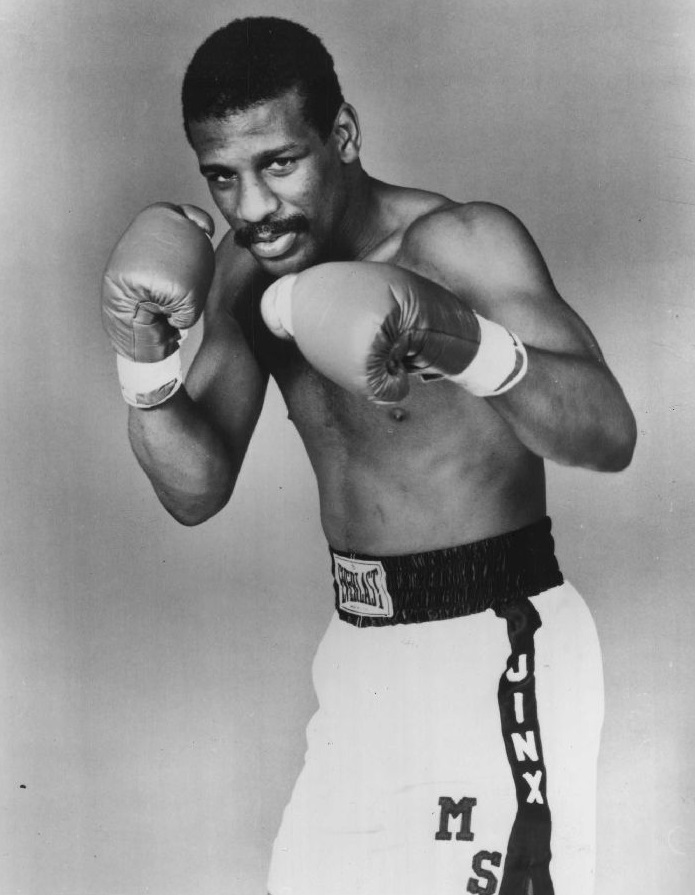
Michael Spinks

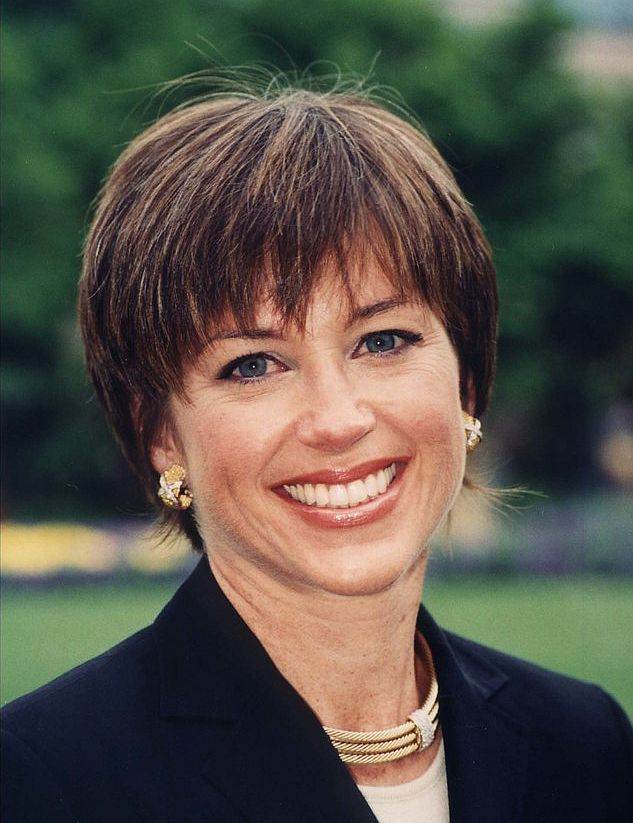
Dorothy Hamill

- July 1
  - Alan Ruck, American actor
  - Gregg L. Semenza, American cellular biologist, recipient of the Nobel Prize in Physiology or Medicine
- July 2 – Jerry Hall, American model and actress
- July 3 – Dorota Pomykała, Polish actress
- July 5
  - Sapawi Ahmad, Malaysian politician
  - Horacio Cartes, former president of Paraguay
  - Louis Herthum, American actor and producer
- July 7
  - Janet Cruz, American politician
  - Mullah Krekar, Iraqi Kurdish scholar and militant
  - Ryuho Okawa, Japanese religious leader (d. 2023)
  - Giam Swiegers, South African-Australian business executive
- July 9 – Tom Hanks, American actor and director
- July 10 – K. Rajagopal, Malaysian football manager and national player
- July 11
  - Amitav Ghosh, Indian novelist
  - Sela Ward, American actress
- July 12 – Mel Harris, American actress
- July 13
  - Günther Jauch, German television host
  - Koffi Olomide, Congolese soukous singer, dancer, producer and composer
  - Michael Spinks, African-American boxer
- July 14
  - Dragan Despot, Croatian actor
  - Vladimir Kulich, Czechoslovak actor
- July 15
  - Ian Curtis, English rock musician (Joy Division) (d. 1980)
  - Barry Melrose, Canadian hockey player, coach and commentator
  - Toshihiko Seko, Japanese long-distance runner
- July 16
  - Jerry Doyle, American talk show host and actor (d. 2016)
  - Tony Kushner, American playwright
- July 18 – Sheila Aldridge, American singer
- July 19 – Yoshiaki Yatsu, Japanese professional wrestler
- July 24
  - Charlie Crist, American politician, 44th governor of Florida
  - Carmen Nebel, German television presenter
- July 25
  - Frances Arnold, American biochemist, recipient of the Nobel Prize in Chemistry
  - Andy Goldsworthy, British sculptor and photographer
- July 26 – Dorothy Hamill, American figure skater, Olympic gold medalist
- July 30 – Delta Burke, American actress
- July 31
  - Michael Biehn, American actor
  - Deval Patrick, American politician, first African-American Governor of Massachusetts

=== August ===
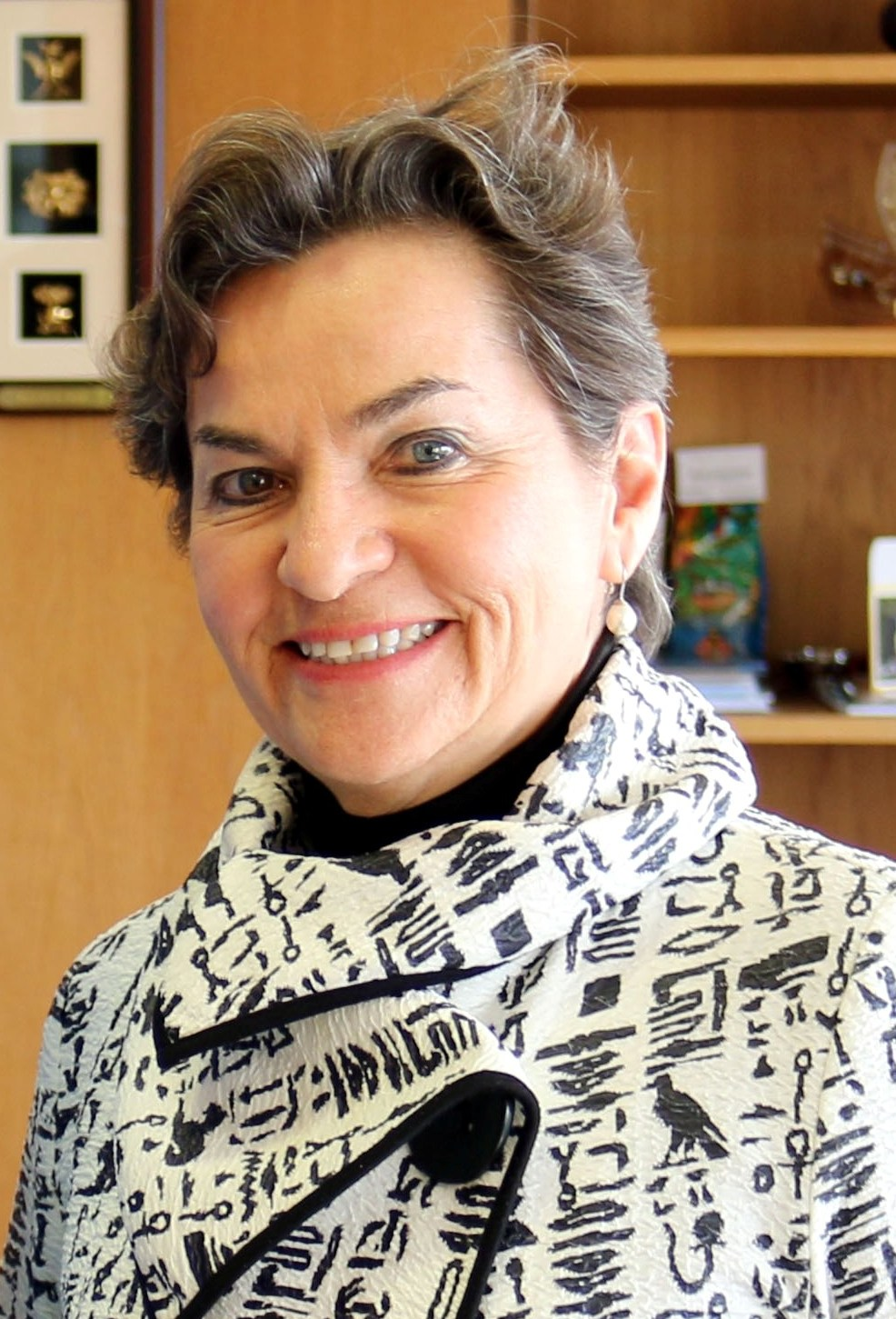
Christiana Figueres

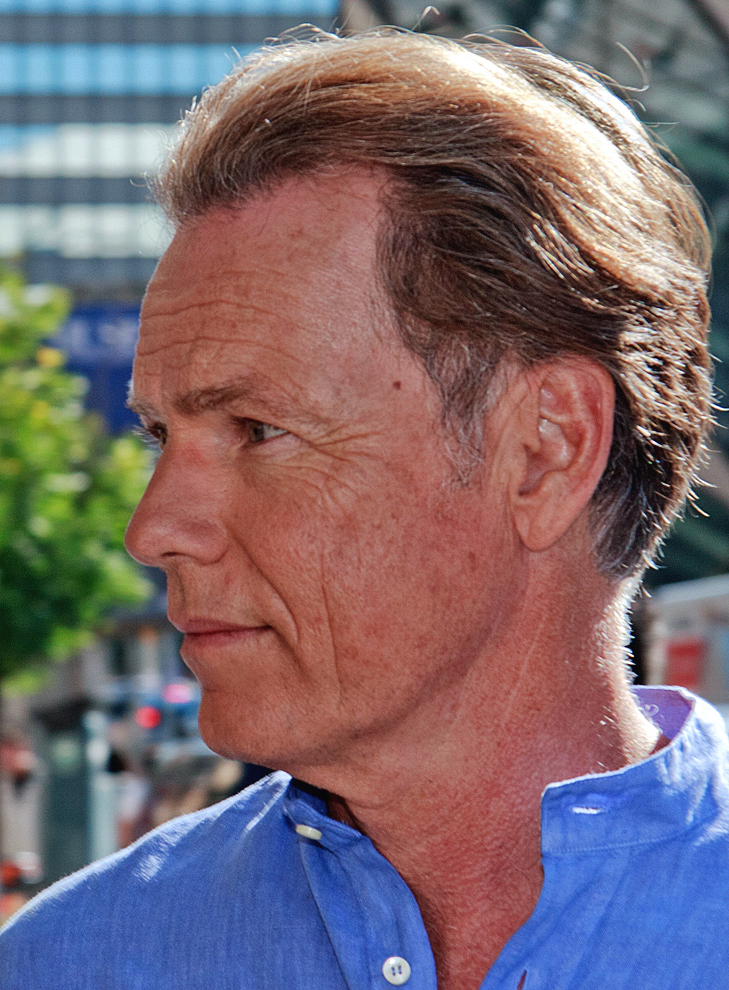
Bruce Greenwood

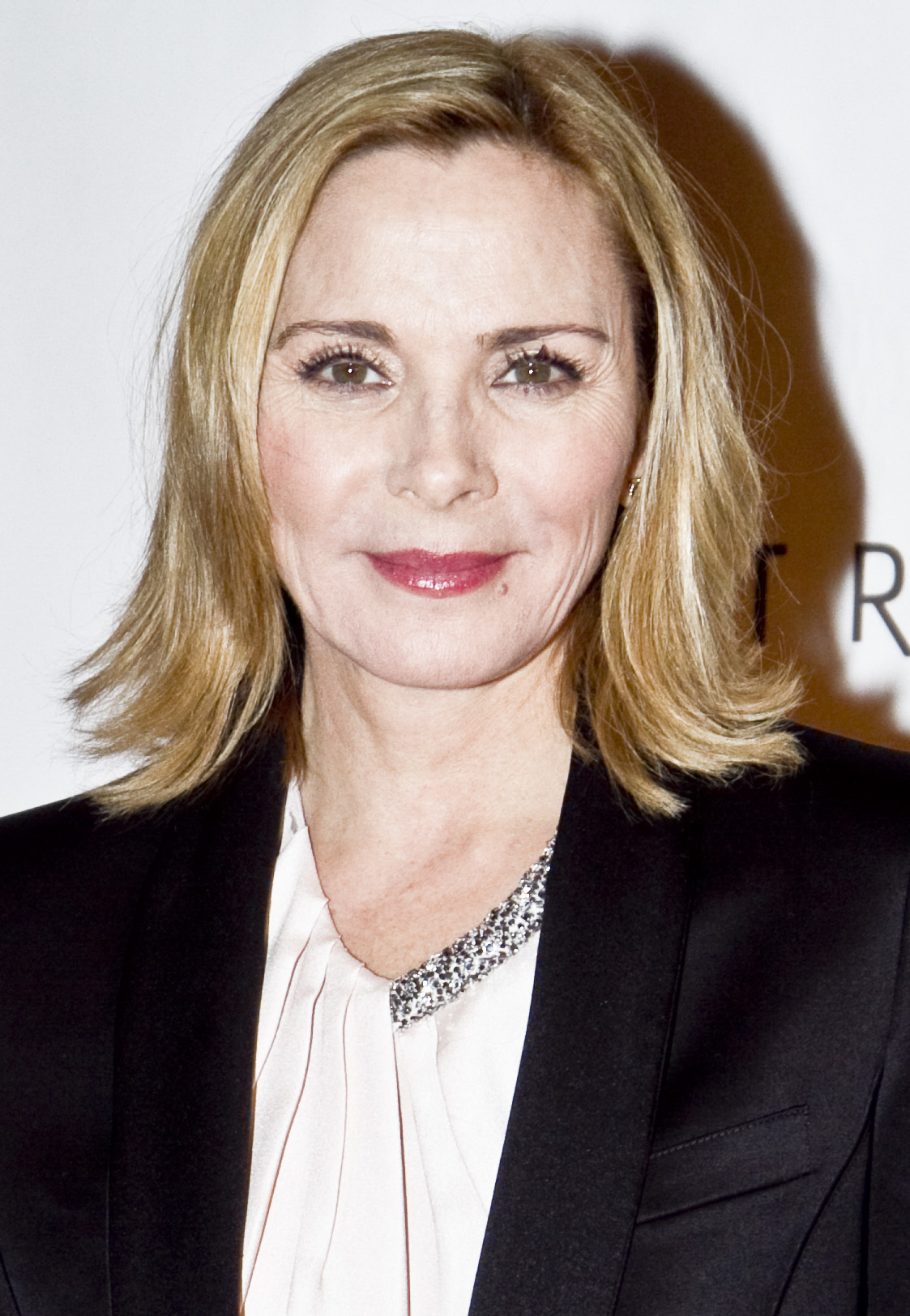
Kim Cattrall

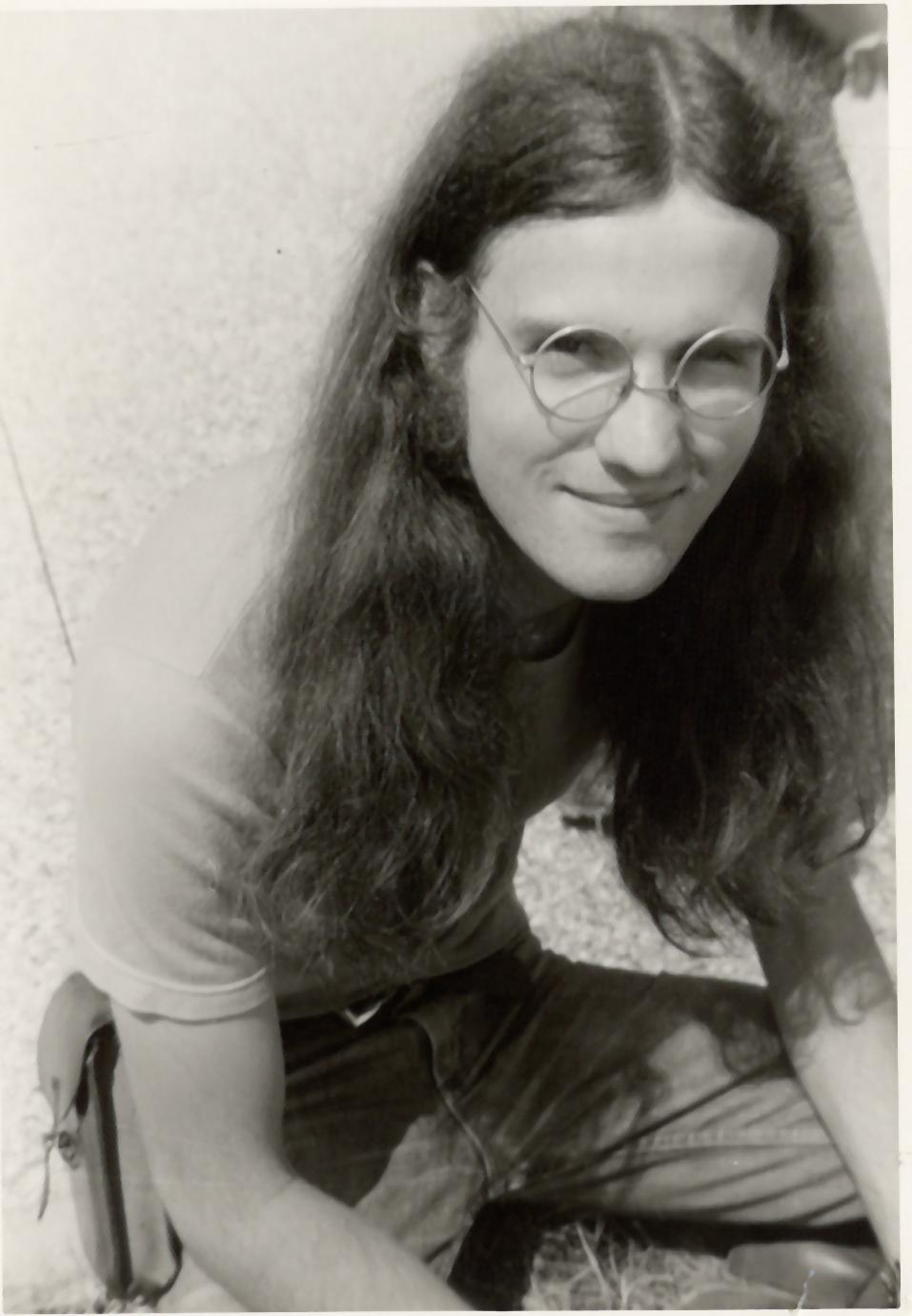
Andreas Floer

- August 4
  - Gerry Cooney, American boxer
  - Randall Wright, Canadian economist
- August 6 – Stepfanie Kramer, American actress
- August 7 – Christiana Figueres, Costa Rican diplomat and environmentalist
- August 10
  - Dianne Fromholtz, Australian tennis player
  - Fred Ottman, American professional wrestler
- August 11 – Richie Ramone, American rock drummer (Ramones)
- August 12 – Bruce Greenwood, Canadian actor
- August 14
  - Jackée Harry, American actress and television personality
  - Rusty Wallace, American NASCAR race car driver
- August 19 – Adam Arkin, American actor
- August 20
  - Joan Allen, American actress
  - Jan Henry T. Olsen, Norwegian politician (d. 2018)
- August 21 – Kim Cattrall, English-born Canadian actress
- August 22 – Paul Molitor, American baseball player
- August 23
  - Andreas Floer, German mathematician (d. 1991)
  - Cris Morena, Argentine actress and television producer
- August 25 – Henri Toivonen, Finnish rally driver (d. 1986)
- August 31
  - Masashi Tashiro, Japanese television performer
  - Tsai Ing-wen, President of the Republic of China (Taiwan)

=== September ===
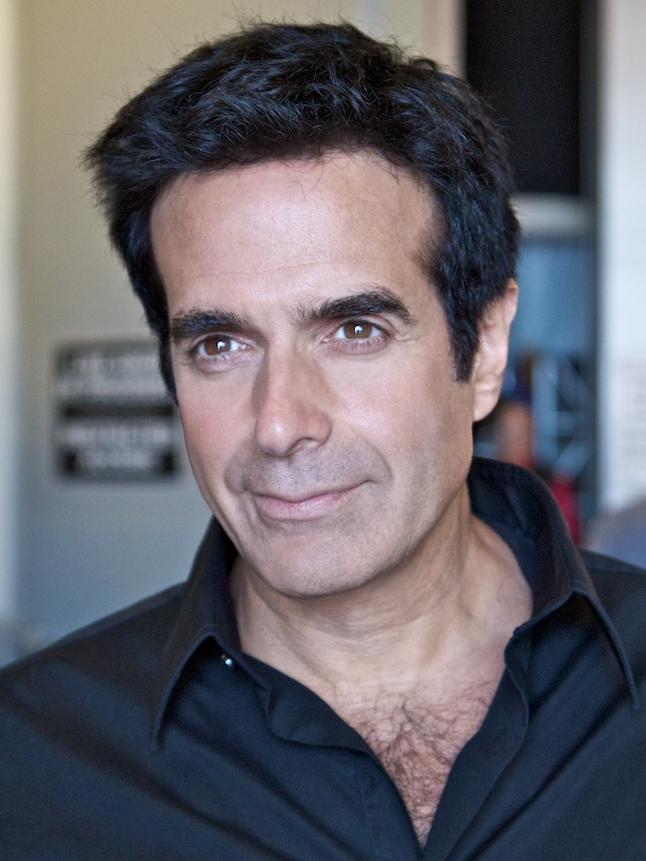
David Copperfield

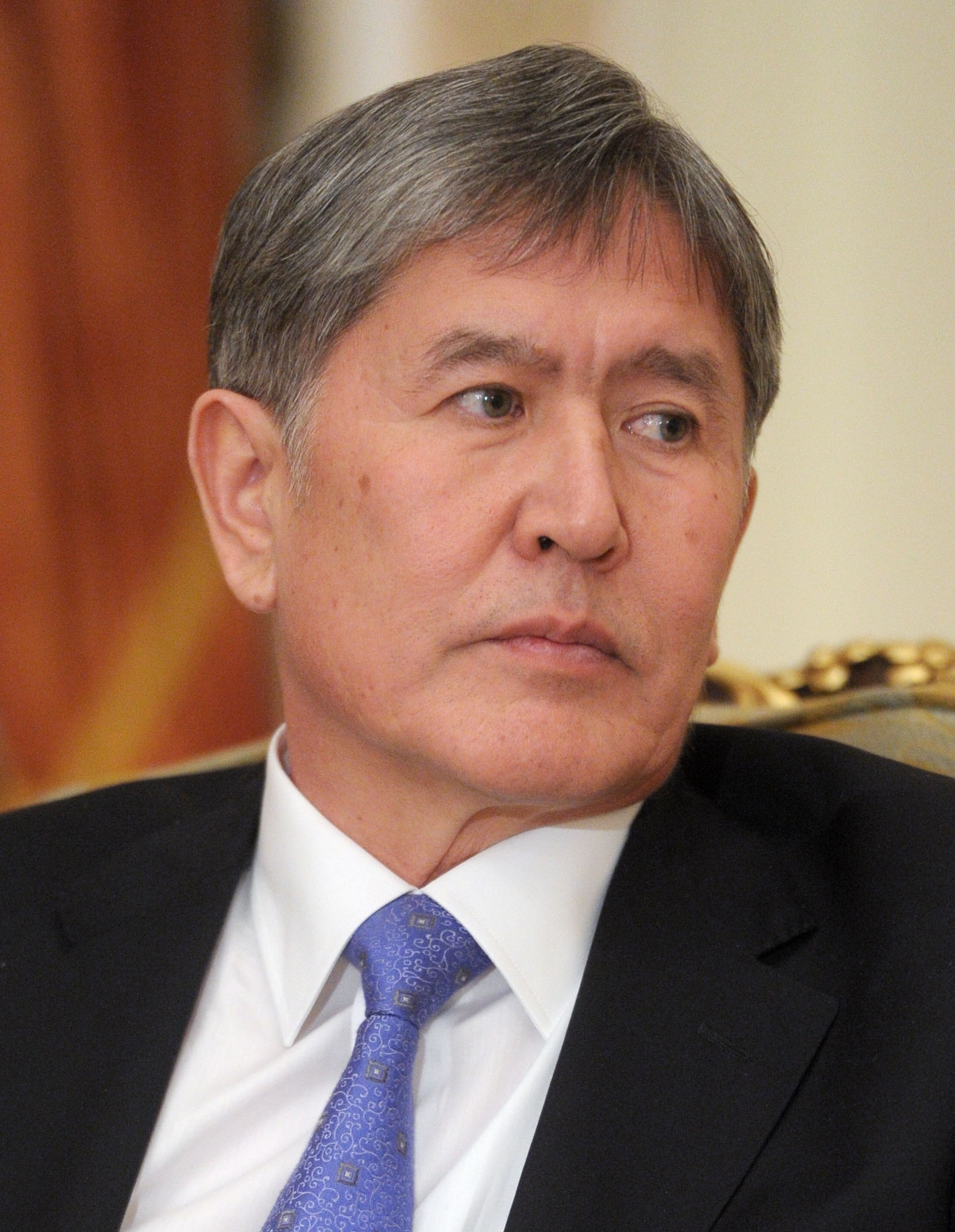
Almazbek Atambayev

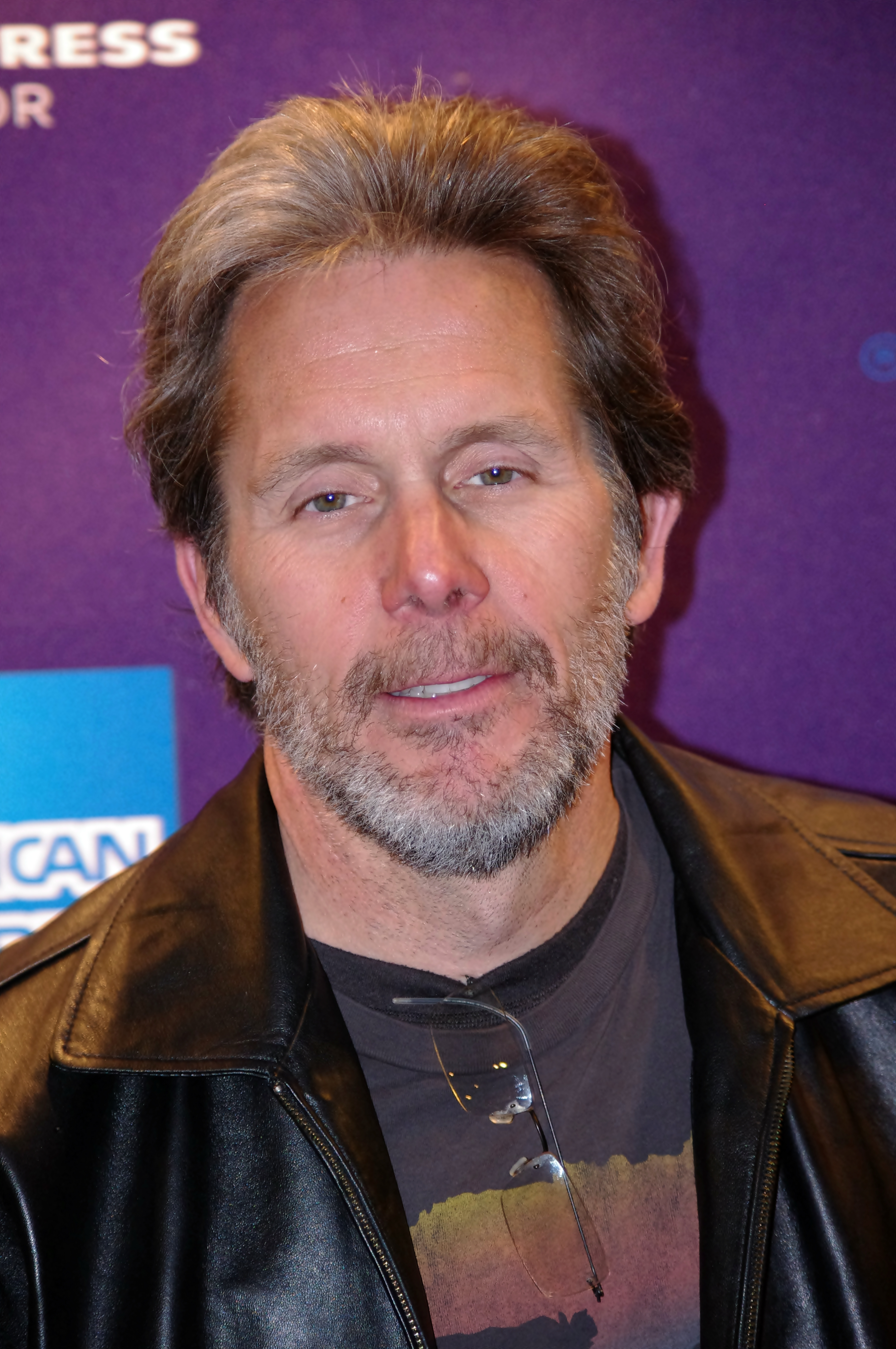
Gary Cole

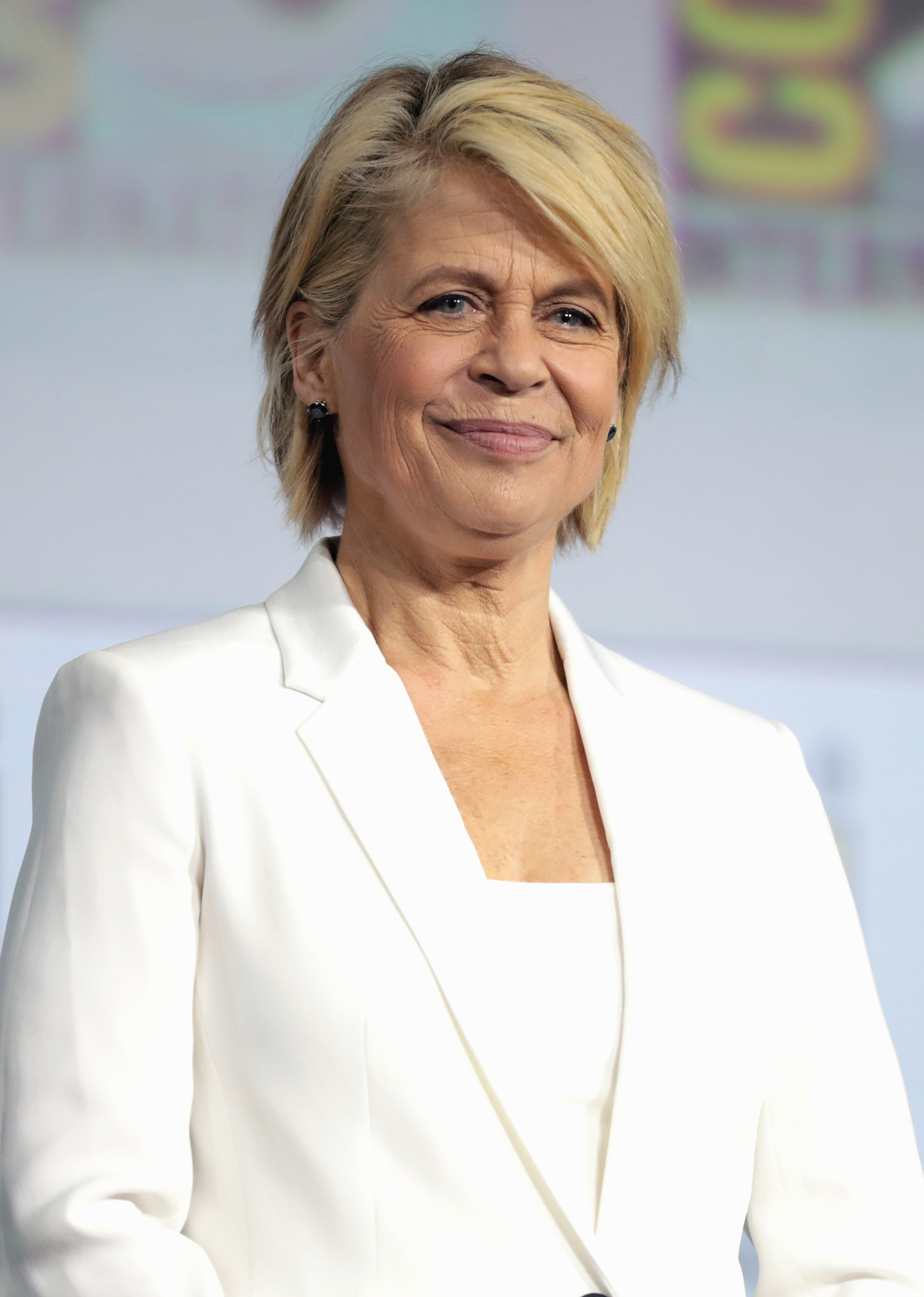
Linda Hamilton

- September 1 – Bernie Wagenblast, American editor and broadcaster
- September 2
  - Nandamuri Harikrishna, Indian actor and politician (d. 2018)
  - Angelo Fusco, Provisional Irish Republican Army member
- September 3 – Pat McGeown, Provisional Irish Republican Army member (d. 1996)
- September 12
  - Leslie Cheung, Hong Kong actor (d. 2003)
  - Walter Woon, law professor, Nominated Member of Parliament and Attorney-General of Singapore
- September 13
  - Ilie Balaci, Romanian footballer (d. 2018)
  - Nicolas Tiangaye, prime minister of the Central African Republic (d. 2026]
- September 14
  - Kostas Karamanlis, Greek politician
  - Ray Wilkins, English footballer and coach (d. 2018)
- September 16
  - Sergei Beloglazov, Russian free-style wrestler
  - David Copperfield, American illusionist
- September 17 – Almazbek Atambayev, 3-Time Prime Minister of Kyrgyzstan and 4th president of Kyrgyzstan
- September 18 – Tim McInnerny, English actor
- September 20
  - Gary Cole, American television, film and voice actor
  - Debbi Morgan, African-American actress
- September 23
  - Mait Riisman, Estonian water polo player (d. 2018)
  - Peter David, comic book writer and novelist (d. 2025
  - Paolo Rossi, Italian soccer player (d. 2020)
- September 25 – Jamie Hyneman, American television co-host
- September 26 – Linda Hamilton, American actress
- September 29 – Sebastian Coe, Baron Coe, British athlete; co-ordinator of the London 2012 Olympic Games

=== October ===
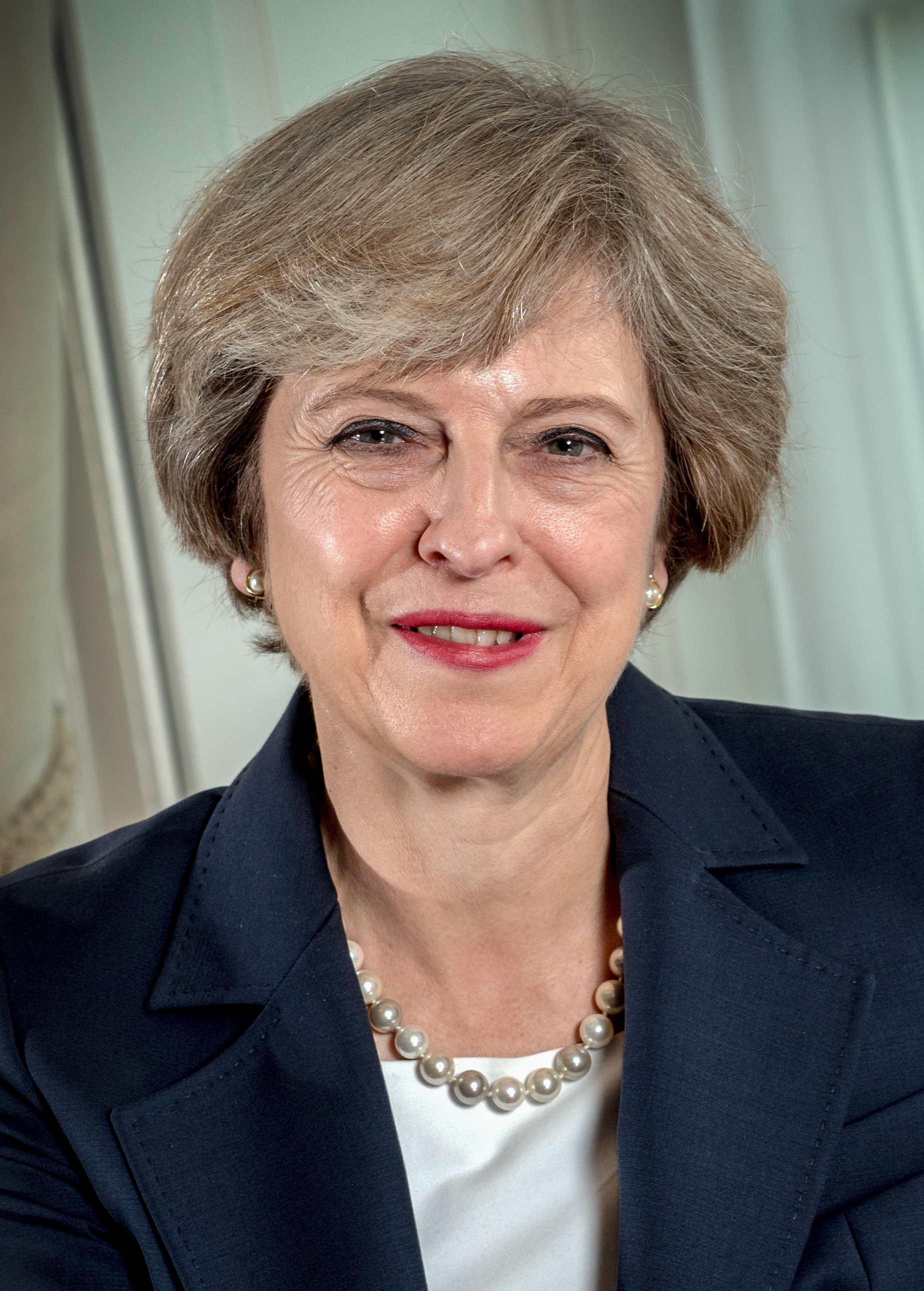
Theresa May

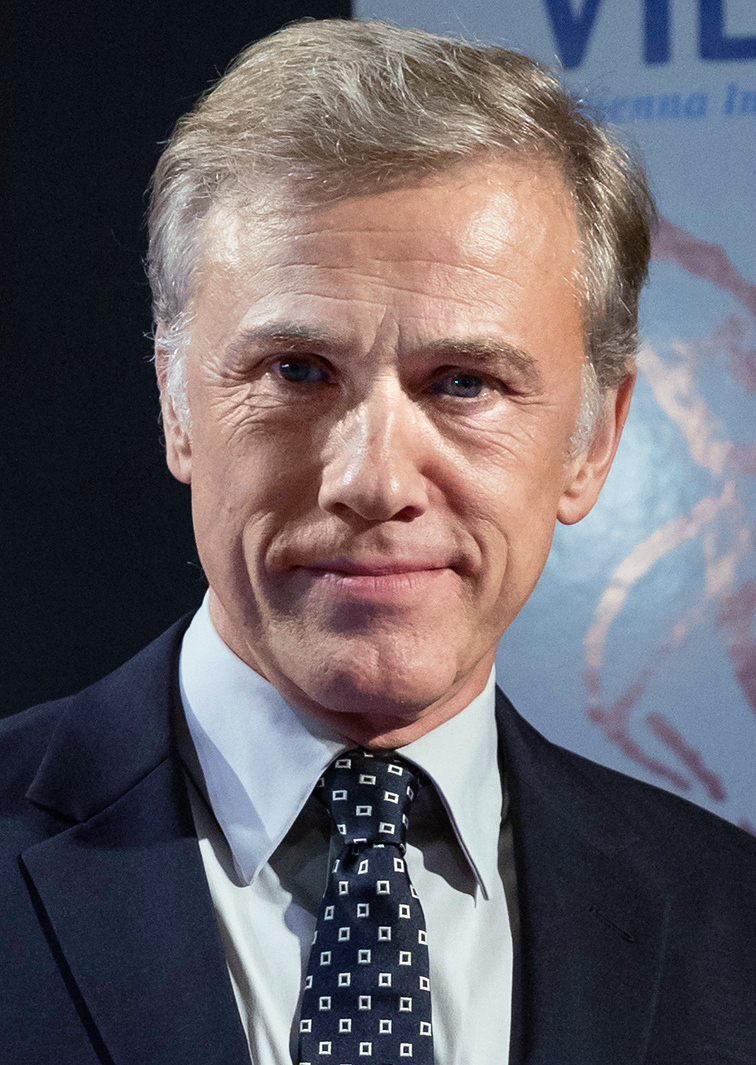
Christoph Waltz

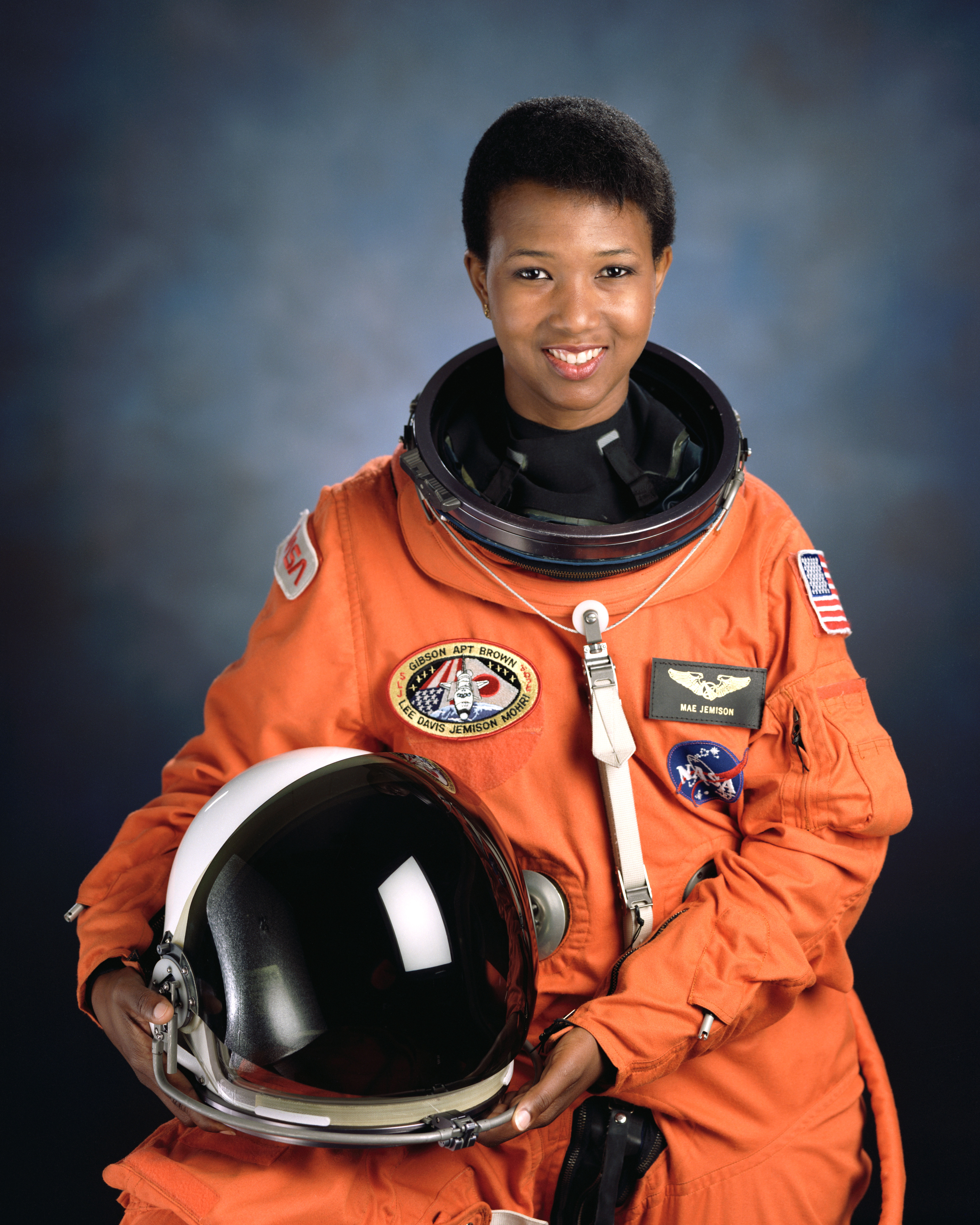
Mae Jemison

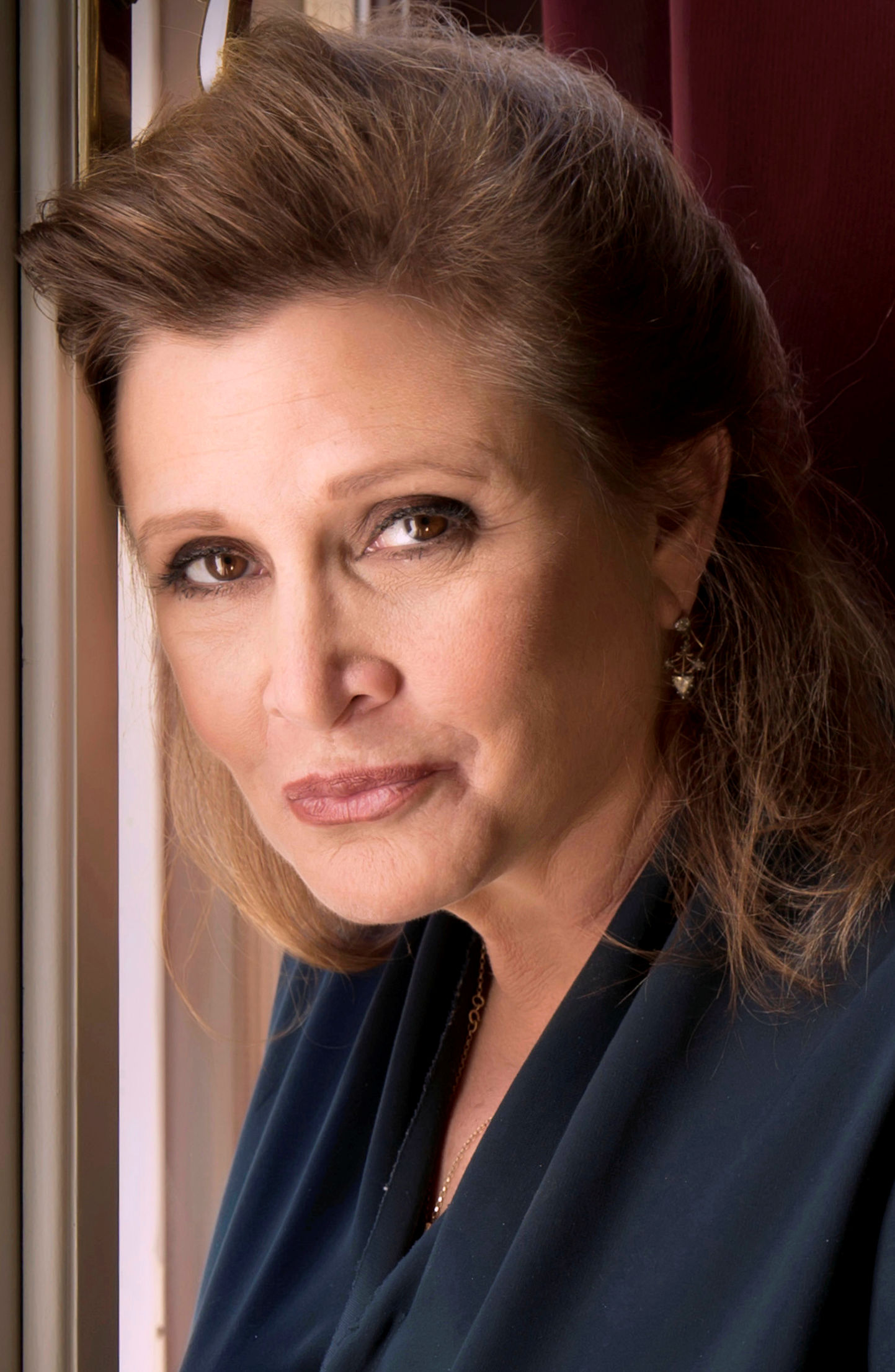
Carrie Fisher

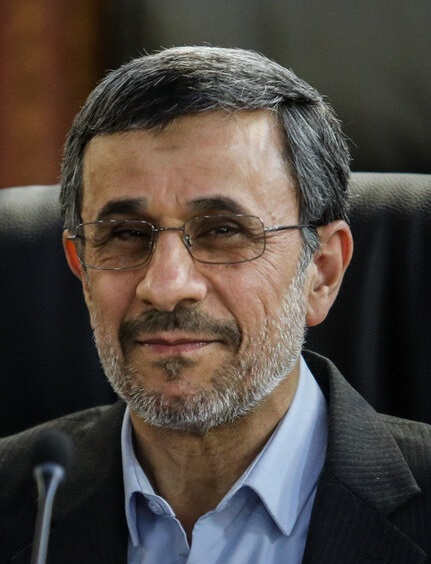
Mahmoud Ahmadinejad

- October 1
  - Tara Buckman, American actress
  - Andrus Ansip, Estonian politician, 10th prime minister of Estonia
  - Theresa May, Prime Minister of the United Kingdom
- October 2 – Charlie Adler, American voice actor and director
- October 3 – Ralph Morgenstern, German actor
- October 4 – Christoph Waltz, German-Austrian actor
- October 8
  - Danny Jacob, American composer, songwriter and guitarist
  - Stephanie Zimbalist, American actress
- October 10 – Amanda Burton, Irish actress
- October 11
  - Nicanor Duarte, 47th president of Paraguay
  - Doug Lawrence, American jazz saxophonist
- October 12 – Trần Đại Quang, President of Vietnam (d. 2018)
- October 16 – Rudra Mohammad Shahidullah, Bangladeshi poet (d. 1991)
- October 17 – Mae Jemison, African-American astronaut
- October 18
  - Craig Bartlett, American animator, writer, storyboard artist, director and voice actor
  - Martina Navratilova, Czech-American multiple Grand Slam title winning tennis player
- October 19 – Carlo Urbani, Italian physician (d. 2003)
- October 20 – Danny Boyle, English film director
- October 21 – Carrie Fisher, American actress and novelist (d. 2016)
- October 22 – Marvin Bush, American businessman
- October 23 – Dwight Yoakam, American country singer, musician and actor
- October 26 – Rita Wilson, American actress and producer
- October 28 – Mahmoud Ahmadinejad, 6th president of Iran

=== November ===
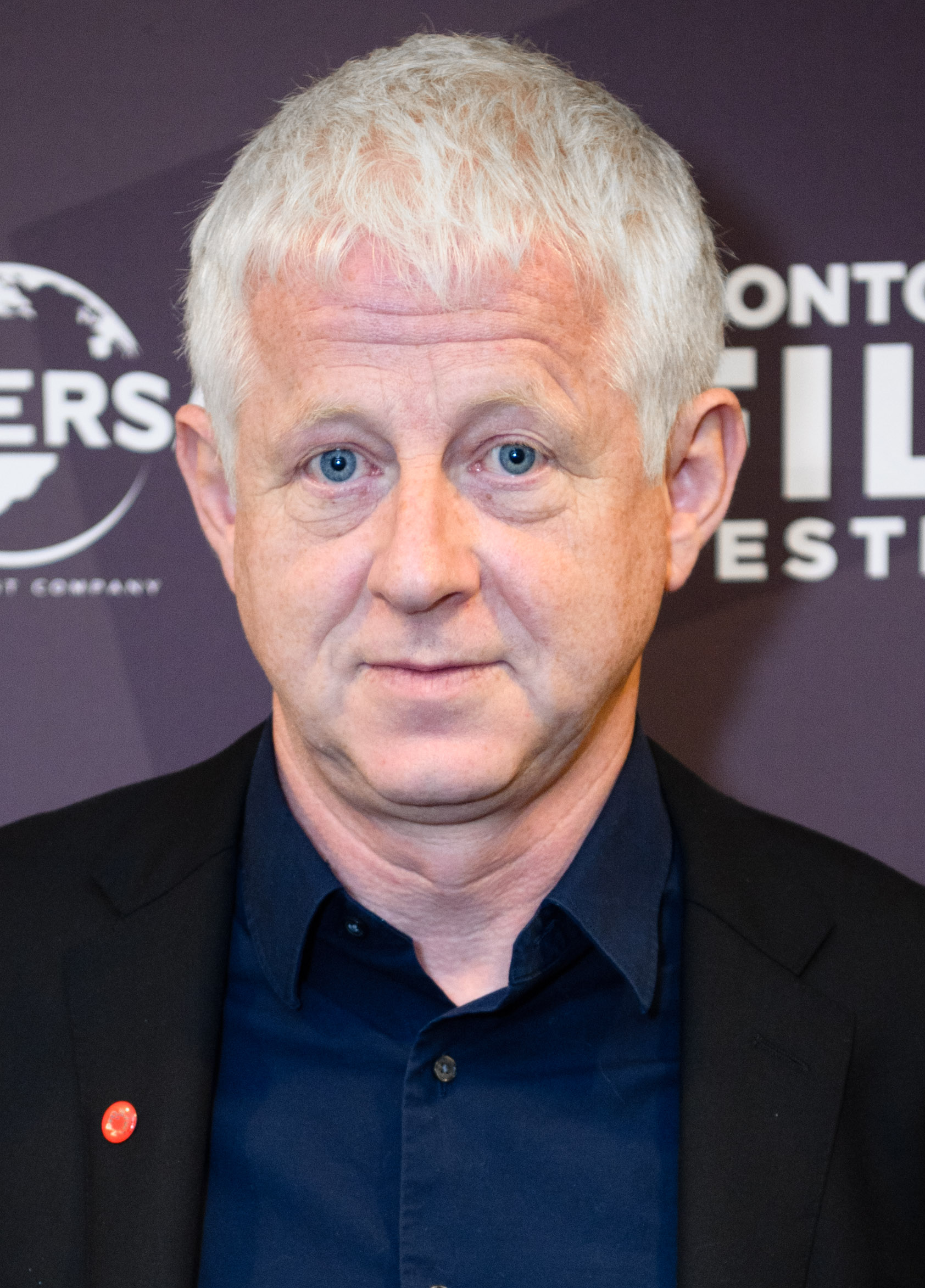
Richard Curtis

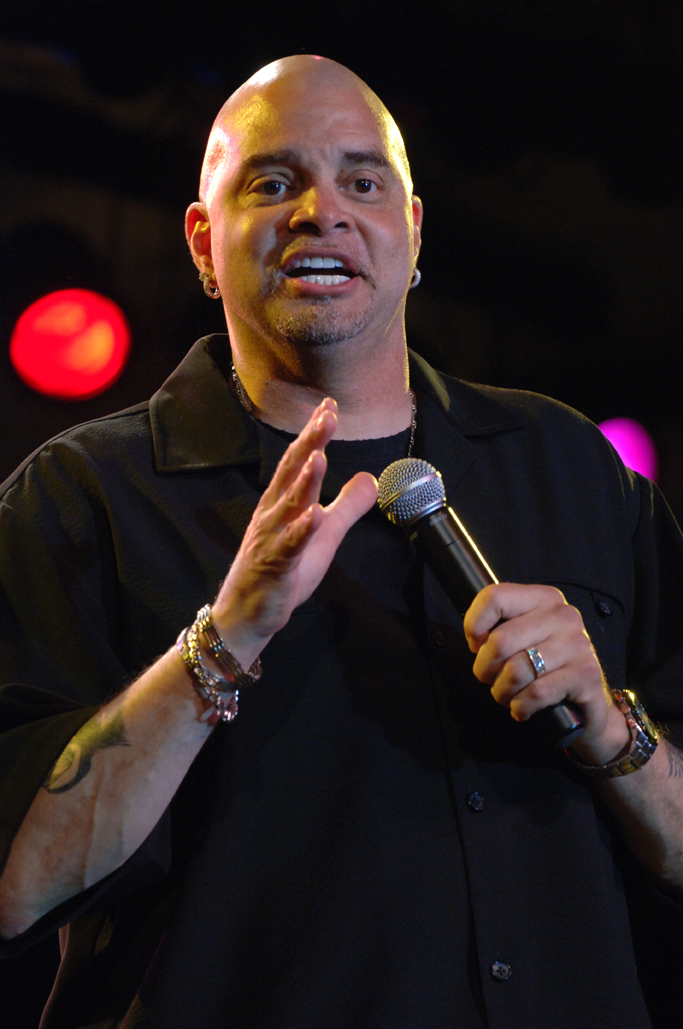
Sinbad

- November 7 – Mikhail Alperin, Soviet-Norwegian jazz pianist (d. 2018)
- November 8
  - Richard Curtis, English film director, producer and screenwriter
  - Kurt Sorensen, New Zealand rugby league player
- November 10 – Sinbad, African-American stand-up, comedian and actor
- November 11
  - Talat Aziz, ghazal singer
  - Edgar Lungu, president of Zambia (d. 2025)
- November 14
  - Avi Cohen, Israeli football player (d. 2010)
  - Greg Pence, American businessman and politician
  - Peter R. de Vries, Dutch crime reporter (d. 2021)
- November 17 – Angelika Machinek, German glider pilot (d. 2006)
- November 18 – Noel Brotherston, Irish footballer (d. 1995)
- November 20
  - Bo Derek, American actress and model
  - Olli Dittrich, German actor, comedian, television personality and musician
- November 22 – Richard Kind, American actor
- November 23
  - Shane Gould, Australian Olympic triple gold medallist swimmer (1972)
  - Nikolay Sidorov, Soviet athlete
- November 24 – Jouni Kaipainen, Finnish composer
- November 26 – Dale Jarrett, American race car driver
- November 27
  - Nazrin Shah of Perak, 35th Sultan of Perak
  - William Fichtner, American actor

=== December ===
Markos Kounalakis

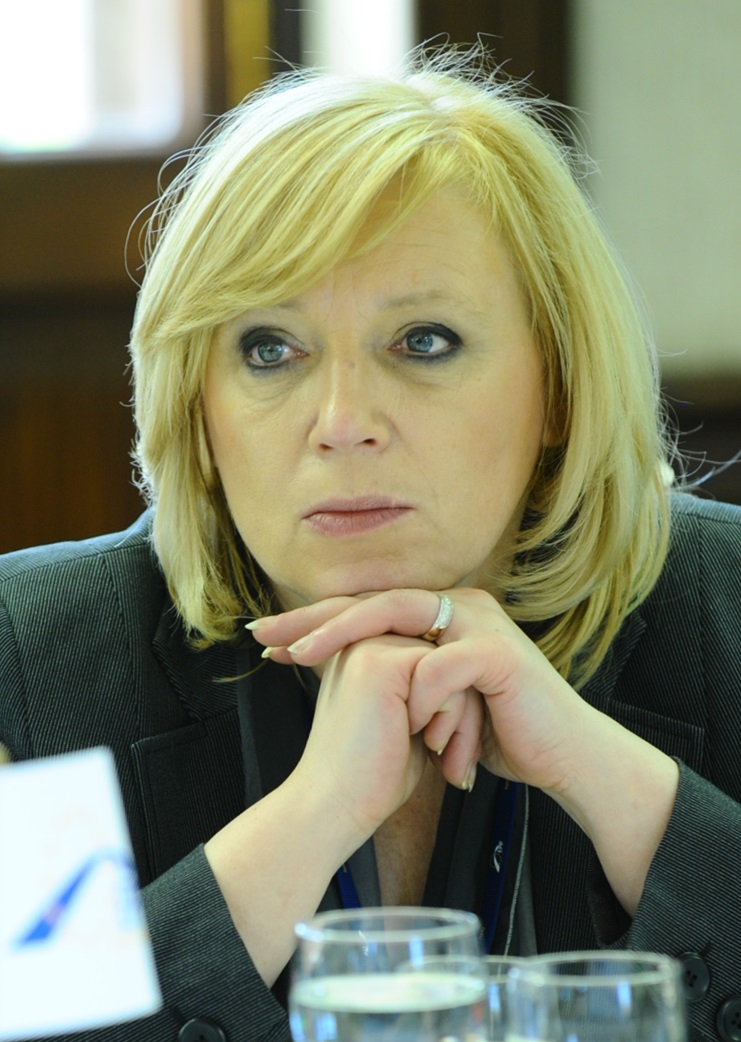
Iveta Radičová

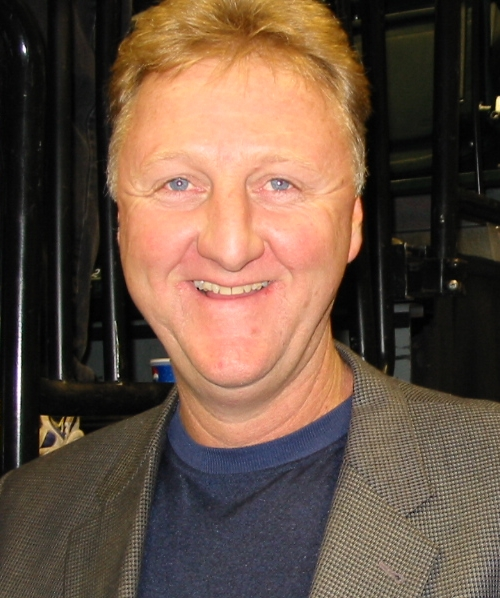
Larry Bird

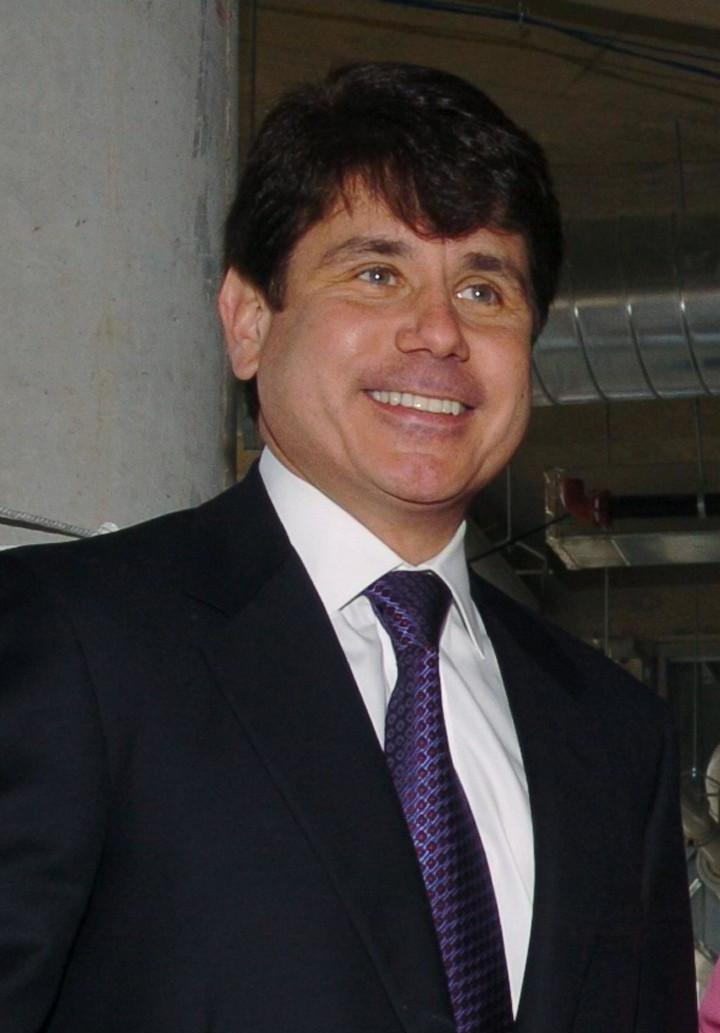
Rod Blagojevich

- December 1 – Sultan bin Zayed bin Sultan Al Nahyan, Emirati politician and royal (d. 2019)
- December 4 – Bernard King, American basketball player and commentator
- December 5
  - Klaus Allofs, German football player
  - Krystian Zimerman, Polish pianist
- December 6
  - Peter Buck, American guitarist
  - Randy Rhoads, American guitarist (d. 1982)
- December 7
  - Chuy Bravo, Mexican-American actor and entertainer (d. 2019)
  - Larry Bird, American basketball player
  - Iveta Radičová, Prime Minister of Slovakia
- December 9 – Baruch Goldstein, American-Israeli physician and mass murderer (d. 1994)
- December 10 – Rod Blagojevich, American politician and convicted felon, Governor of Illinois (2003–2009)
- December 12
  - Ana Alicia, Mexican actress
  - Johan van der Velde, Dutch cyclist
- December 13 – Majida El Roumi, Lebanese singer
- December 14 – Béla Réthy, German sports journalist
- December 18 – Ron White, American comedian
- December 19 – Masami Akita, Japanese noise musician (also known as Merzbow)
- December 21 – Anna Erlandsson, Swedish filmmaker and animator
- December 23
  - Michele Alboreto, Italian racing driver (d. 2001)
  - Dave Murray, British musician (Iron Maiden)
- December 24 – Anil Kapoor, Indian actor
- December 26 – David Sedaris, American essayist
- December 28
  - Nigel Kennedy, English violinist
  - Jimmy Nicholl, Canadian-born footballer
- December 30
  - Patricia Kalember, American actress
  - Sheryl Lee Ralph, African American-actress
- December 31 – Hussein Ahmed Salah, Djiboutian marathon runner

== Deaths ==
=== January ===
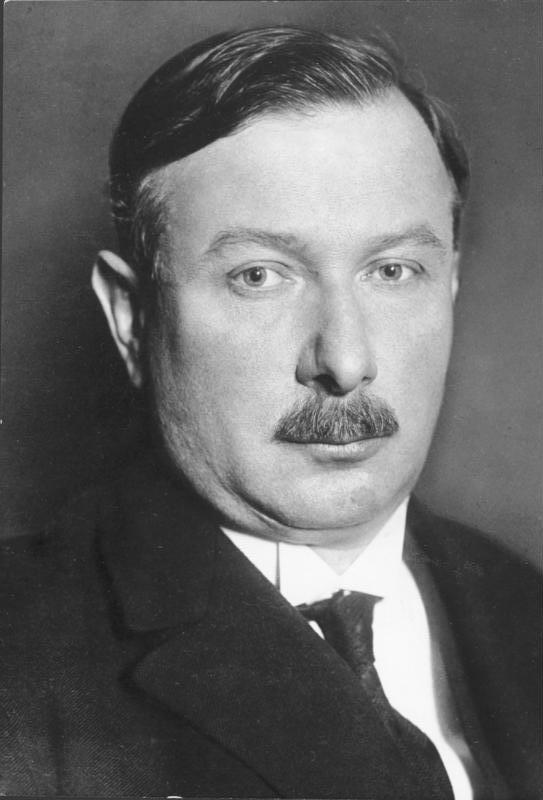
Joseph Wirth

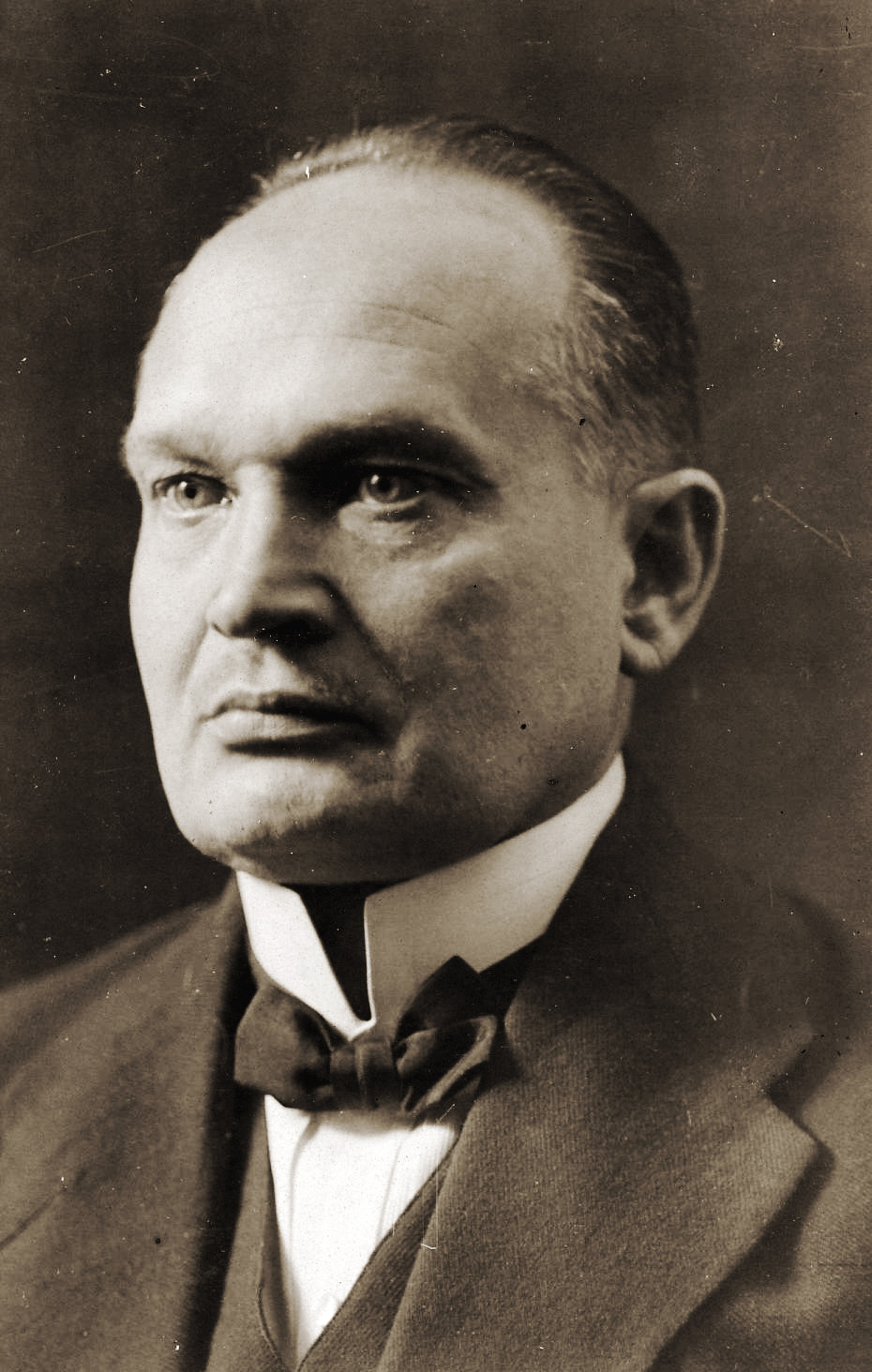
Konstantin Päts

- January 3
  - Alexander Gretchaninov, Russian composer (b. 1864)
  - Joseph Wirth, Chancellor of Germany (b. 1879)
- January 5 – Mistinguett, French singer and actress (b. 1875)
- January 9 – Marion Leonard, American actress (b. 1881)
- January 12 – Norman Kerry, American actor (b. 1894)
- January 18 – Konstantin Päts, 1st president of Estonia (b. 1874)
- January 23 – Sir Alexander Korda, Hungarian-born film director (b. 1893)
- January 27 – Erich Kleiber, German conductor (b. 1890)
- January 29 – H. L. Mencken, American writer (b. 1880)
- January 31 – A. A. Milne, English author (Winnie The Pooh) (b. 1882)

=== February ===
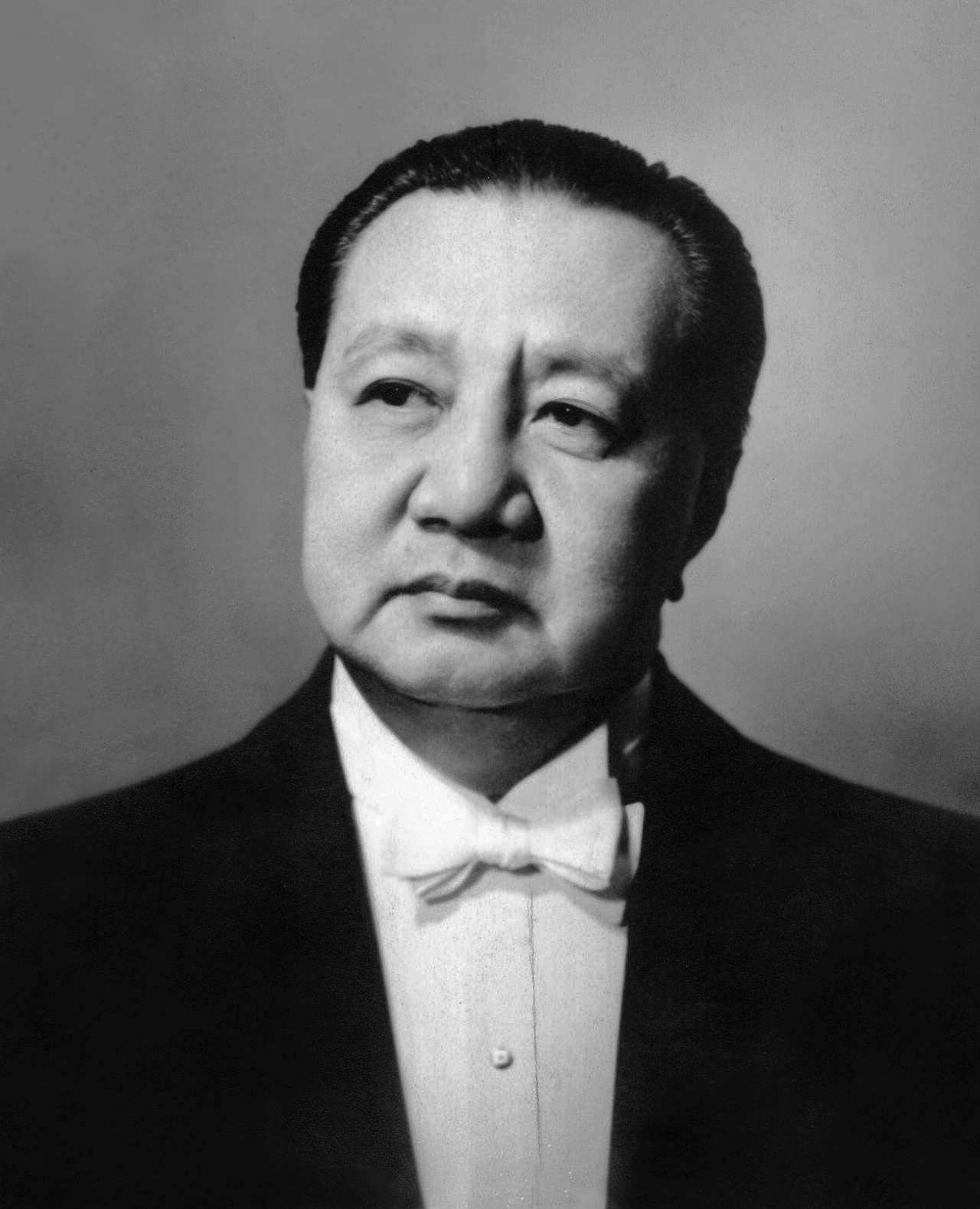
Elpidio Quirino

- February 2
  - Bob Burns, American comedian (b. 1890)
  - Charley Grapewin, American actor (b. 1869)
- February 3 – Robert Yerkes, American psychologist and ethologist (b. 1876)
- February 8 – Connie Mack, American baseball executive and manager (Philadelphia Athletics) and a member of the MLB Hall of Fame (b. 1862)
- February 10 – Hugh Trenchard, 1st Viscount Trenchard, British marshal of the Royal Air Force (b. 1873)
- February 18 – Gustave Charpentier, French composer (b. 1860)
- February 20 – Heinrich Barkhausen, German physicist (b. 1881)
- February 26 – Elsie Janis, American singer and actress (b. 1889)
- February 28
  - Carlo Gnocchi, Italian Roman Catholic priest and blessed (b. 1902)
  - Frigyes Riesz, Hungarian mathematician (b. 1880)
- February 29 – Elpidio Quirino, 6th president of the Philippines (b. 1890)

=== March ===
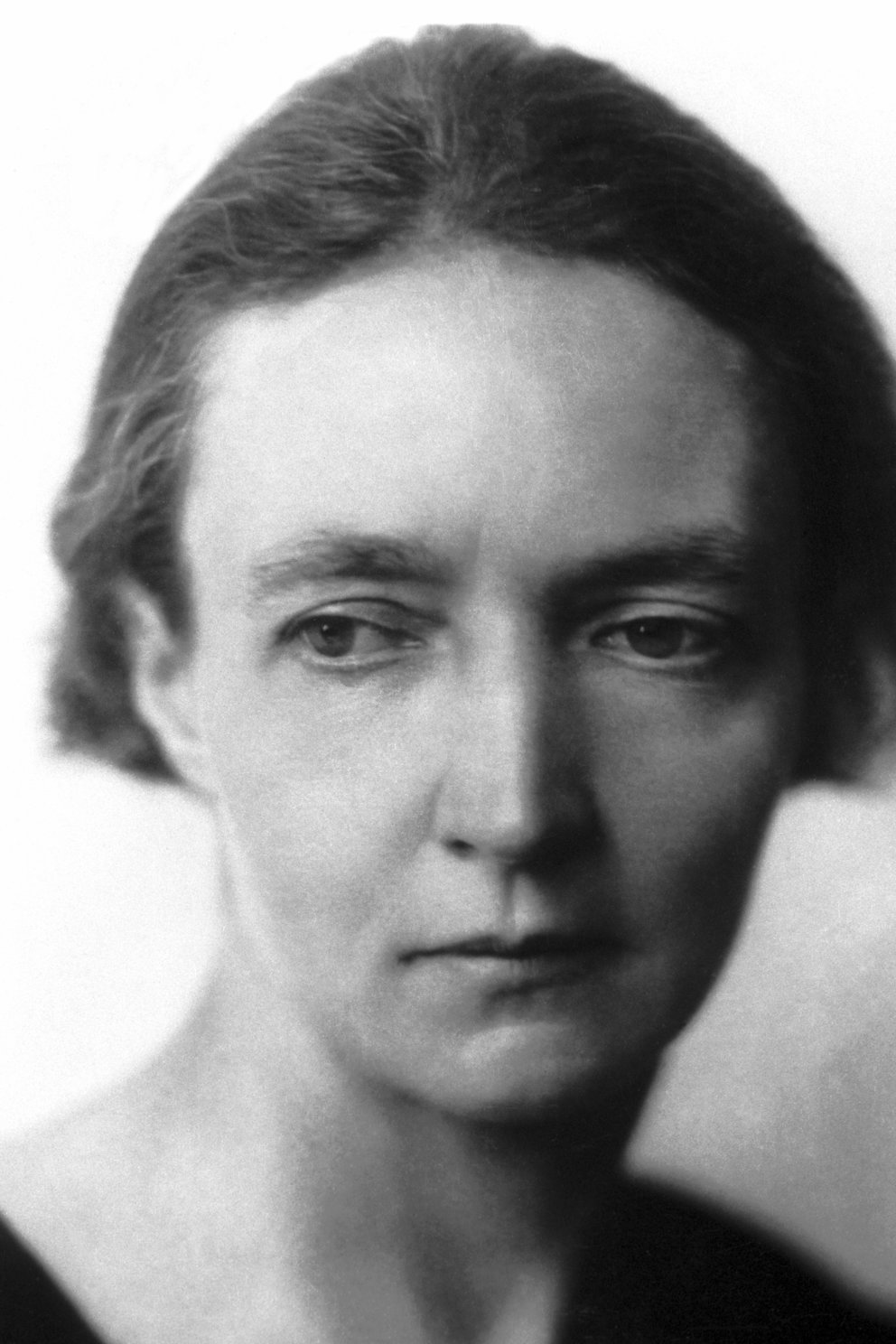
Irène Joliot-Curie

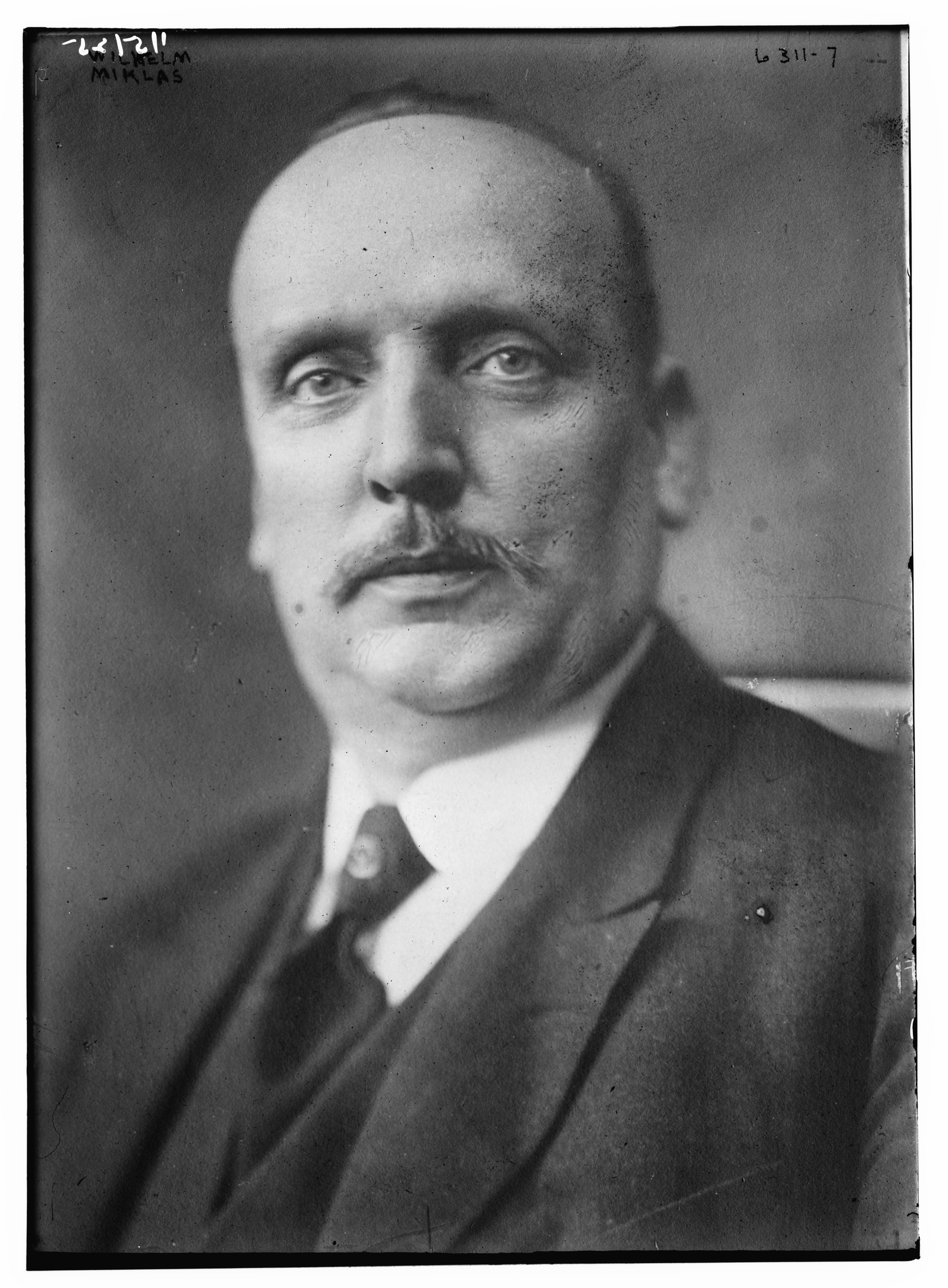
Wilhelm Miklas

- March 12 – Bolesław Bierut, Polish Communist politician and statesman, former prime minister and president of Poland (b. 1892)
- March 14 – David Browning, American Olympic diver (b. 1931)
- March 17
  - Fred Allen, American comedian (b. 1894)
  - Irène Joliot-Curie, French physicist, recipient of the Nobel Prize in Chemistry (b. 1897)
- March 18 – Louis Bromfield, American writer (b. 1896)
- March 20
  - Fanny Durack, Australian swimmer (b. 1889)
  - Wilhelm Miklas, 3rd president of Austria (b. 1872)
- March 22
  - Eduardo Lonardi, 30th president of Argentina (b. 1896)
  - George Sarton, Belgian-American chemist and historian (b. 1884)
- March 25 – Robert Newton, English actor (b. 1905)
- March 28 – Thomas de Hartmann, Russian composer (b. 1885)
- March 30 – Edmund Clerihew Bentley, English writer (b. 1875)
- March 31 – Ralph DePalma, Italian-born American race car driver (b. 1884)

=== April ===
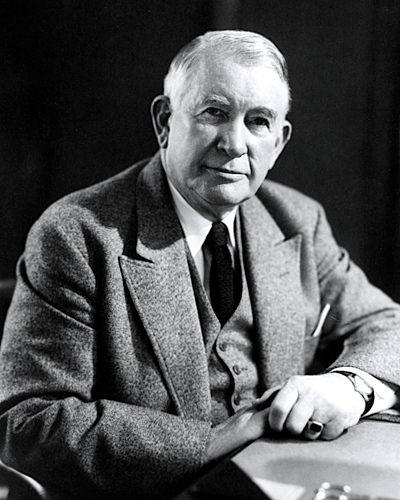
Alben W. Barkley

- April 13 – Emil Nolde, German-Danish painter (b. 1867)
- April 15 – Kathleen Howard, Canadian-born American actress and opera singer (b. 1884)
- April 19 – Ernst Robert Curtius, Alsatian philologist (b. 1886)
- April 21
  - Charles MacArthur, American playwright and screenwriter (b. 1895)
- April 24 – Henry Stephenson, British actor (b. 1871)
- April 26 – Edward Arnold, American actor (b. 1890)
- April 29
  - Harold Bride, English-born junior radio officer on RMS Titanic (b. 1890)
  - Wilhelm Ritter von Leeb, German field marshal (b. 1876)
- April 30 – Alben W. Barkley, 35th Vice President of the United States (b. 1877)

=== May ===
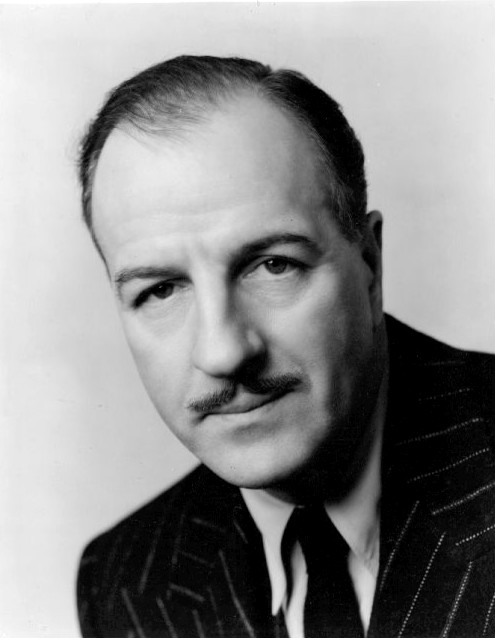
Louis Calhern

- May 6 – Fergus Anderson, British motorcycle racer (b. 1909)
- May 12 – Louis Calhern, American actor (b. 1895)
- May 15 – Austin Osman Spare, English artist and occultist (b. 1886)
- May 20
  - Max Beerbohm, English essayist, parodist and caricaturist (b. 1872)
  - Zoltán Halmay, Hungarian Olympic swimmer (b. 1881)
- May 23 – Gustav Suits, Estonian poet (b. 1883)
- May 24
  - Eugen Dieth, dialectologist (b. 1893)
  - Guy Kibbee, American actor (b. 1882)
- May 26 – Al Simmons, American baseball player (b. 1902)
- May 29 – Frank Beaurepaire, Australian Olympic swimmer (b. 1891)
- May 30 – George Murray Levick, British Antarctic explorer and naval surgeon (b. 1876)
- May 31 – Diedrich Hermann Westermann, German linguist (b. 1875)

=== June ===
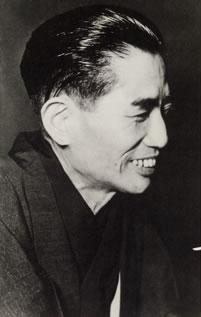
Michio Miyagi

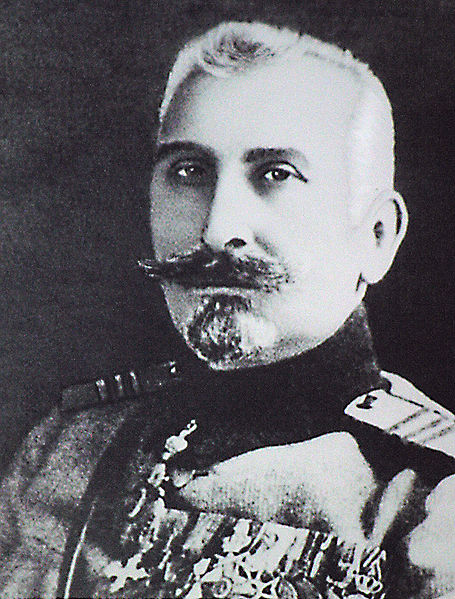
Artur Văitoianu

- June 2 – Jean Hersholt, Danish-born American actor (b. 1886)
- June 4 – Katherine MacDonald, American actress (b. 1891)
- June 6
  - Hiram Bingham III, American explorer, discoverer of Machu Picchu (b. 1875)
  - Margaret Wycherly, English actress (b. 1881)
- June 7 – Julien Benda, French philosopher and novelist (b. 1867)
- June 11
  - Frank Brangwyn, Anglo-Welsh artist (b. 1867)
  - Ralph Morgan, American actor (b. 1883)
- June 17 – Artur Văitoianu, Romanian general and politician, 27th prime minister of Romania (b. 1864)
- June 19 – Thomas J. Watson, American computer pioneer (b. 1874)
- June 22 – Walter de la Mare, English poet, short story writer, and novelist (b. 1873)
- June 23 – Reinhold Glière, Russian composer (b. 1875)
- June 25 – Ernest King, American Navy Fleet Admiral and Commander in Chief (b. 1878)
- June 26 – Clifford Brown, American jazz trumpeter (b. 1930)

=== July ===
- July 1 – Tawfik Abu Al-Huda, 4-time Prime Minister of Jordan (b. 1895)
- July 3 – Johnny Claes, English racing driver and bandleader (b. 1916)
- July 7 – Gottfried Benn, German poet (b. 1886)
- July 8 – Giovanni Papini, Italian essayist, poet, novelist (b. 1881)

=== August ===
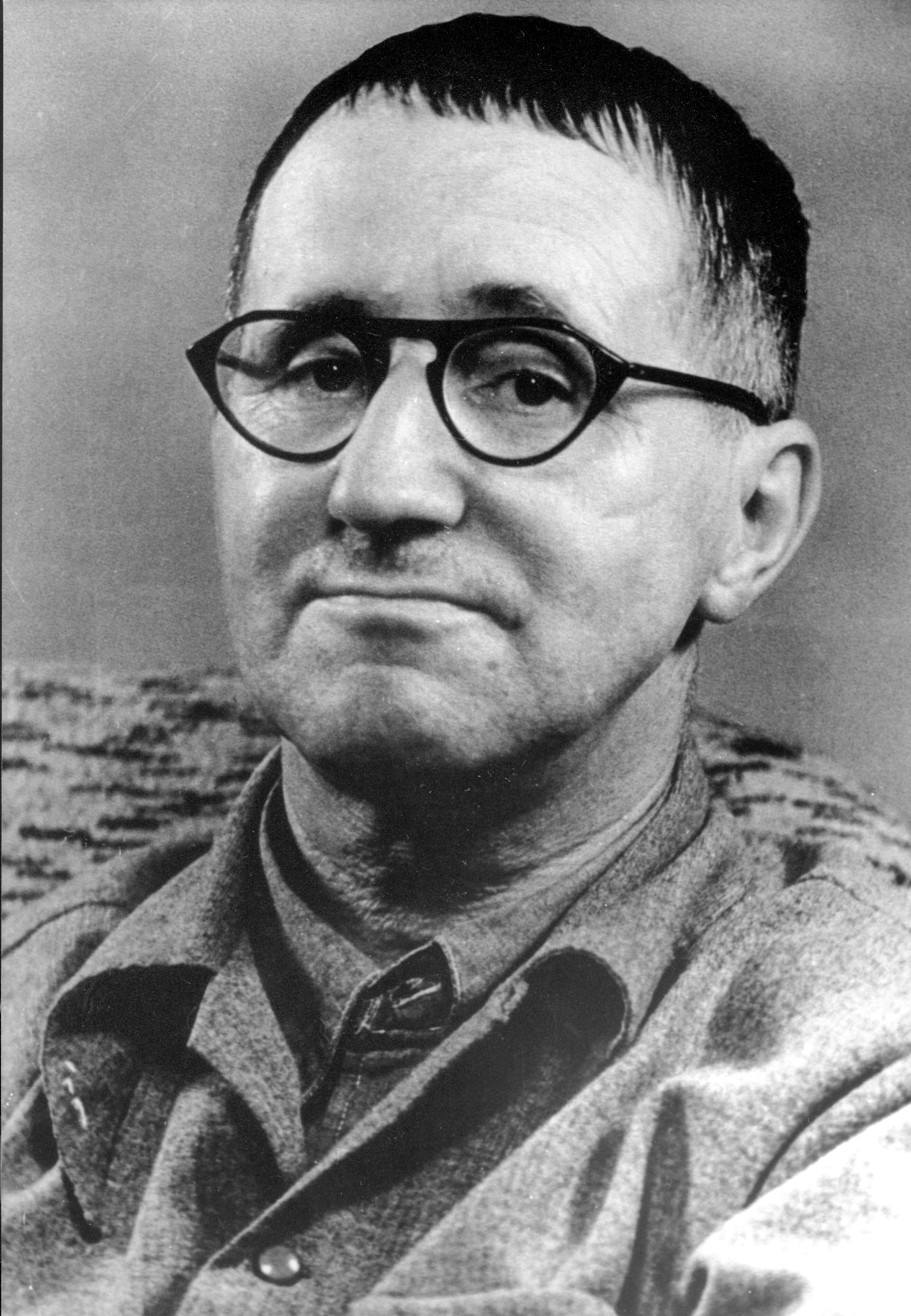
Bertolt Brecht

- August 11
  - Jackson Pollock, American painter (b. 1912; car accident)
  - Mincho Neychev, former chairman of the Presidium of the National Assembly (head of state) of Bulgaria (b. 1887)
- August 14
  - Bertolt Brecht, German playwright (b. 1898)
  - Konstantin von Neurath, Nazi German diplomat and foreign minister (b. 1873)
- August 16 – Bela Lugosi, Hungarian-born American film actor (Dracula) (b. 1882)
- August 24 – Kenji Mizoguchi, Japanese film director (b. 1898)
- August 25 – Alfred Kinsey, American sex researcher (b. 1894)

=== September ===
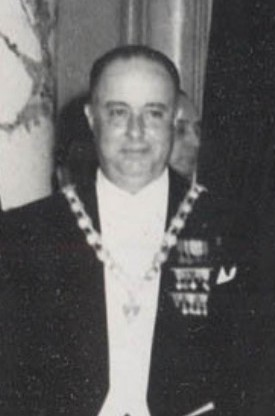
Anastasio Somoza García

- September 6 – Lee Jung-seob, Korean oil painter (b. 1916)
- September 7 – C. B. Fry, English sportsman and writer (b. 1872)
- September 11
  - Billy Bishop, Canadian World War I flying ace (b. 1894)
  - Carlos Bulosan, Filipino-American novelist and poet (b. 1913)
  - Lucien Febvre, French historian (b. 1878)
- September 20 – Flora Eldershaw, Australian novelist, critic, and historian (b. 1897)
- September 22 – Frederick Soddy, English chemist, Nobel Prize laureate (b. 1877)
- September 27 – Babe Didrikson Zaharias, American golfer (b. 1911)
- September 28 – William E. Boeing, American engineer and airplane manufacturer (b. 1881)
- September 29 – Anastasio Somoza García, 29th president of Nicaragua (b. 1896)

=== October ===
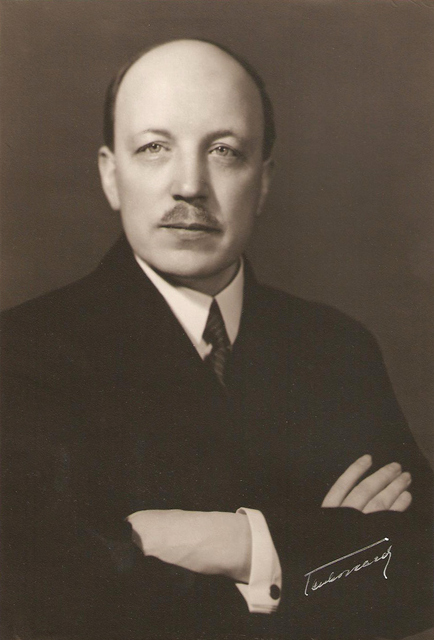
Risto Ryti

- October 2 – George Bancroft, American actor (b. 1882)
- October 6 – Charles E. Merrill, American banker, co-founder of Merrill Lynch (b. 1885)
- October 9 – Marie Doro, American actress (b. 1882)
- October 12 – Lorenzo Perosi, Italian composer (b. 1872)
- October 14 – Jules Richard, French mathematician (b. 1862)
- October 16 – Jules Rimet, French football administrator, 3rd president of FIFA (b. 1873)
- October 17 – Anne Crawford, British actress (b. 1920)
- October 19 – Isham Jones, American musician (b. 1894)
- October 22 – Hannah Mitchell, English socialist and suffragette (b. 1872)
- October 25 – Risto Ryti, 23rd prime minister of Finland and 5th president of Finland (b. 1889)
- October 26 – Walter Gieseking, French-born German pianist (b. 1895)
- October 30 – Pío Baroja, Spanish novelist (b. 1872)

=== November ===
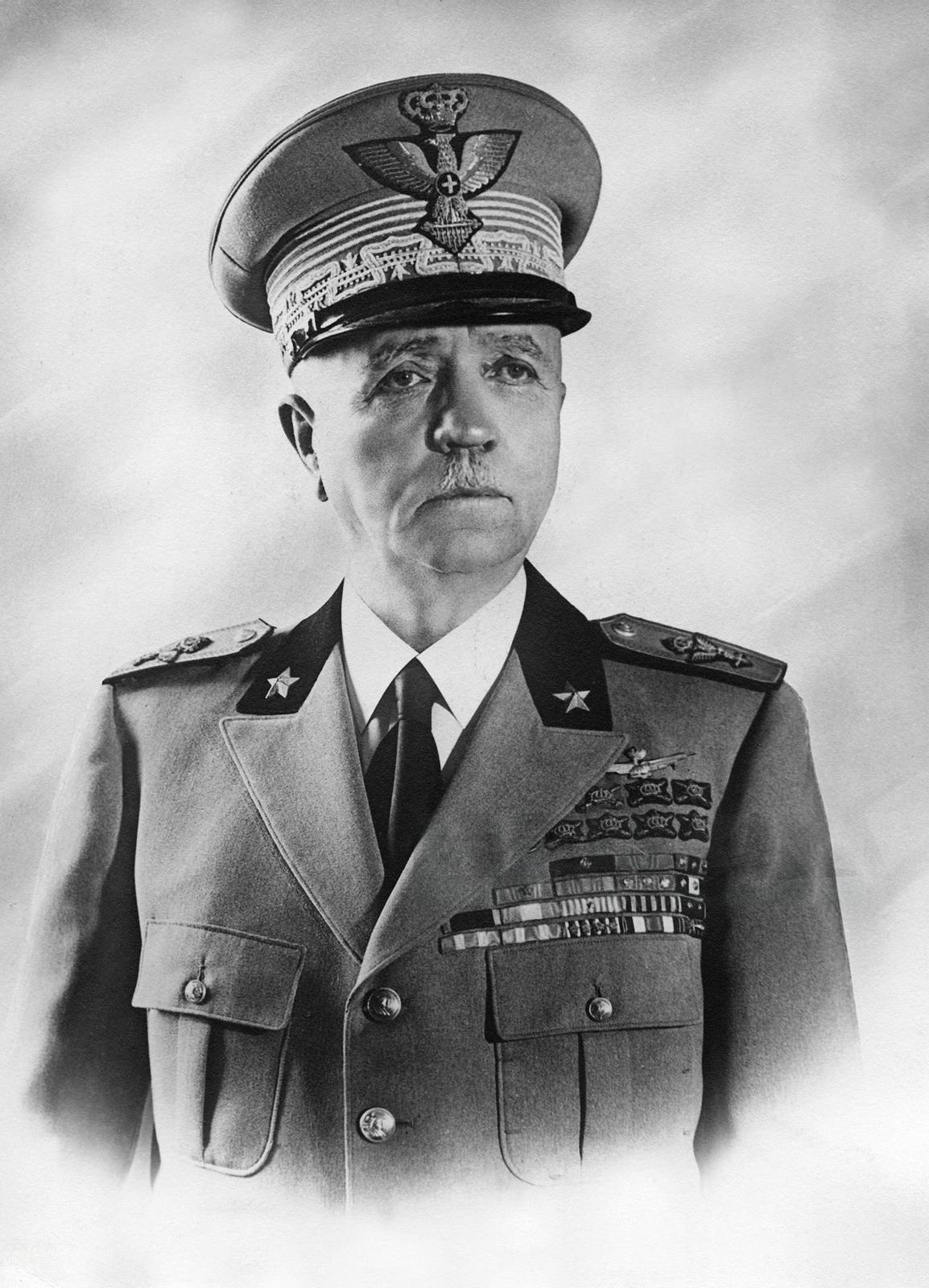
Pietro Badoglio

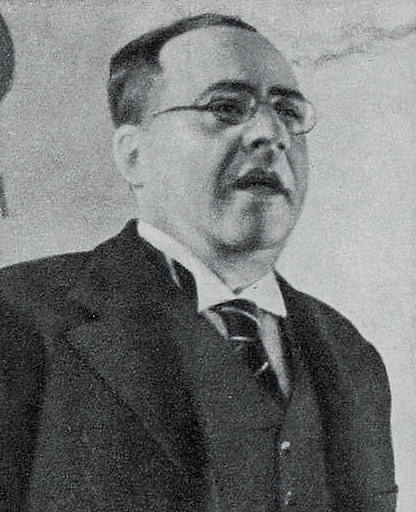
Juan Negrín

- November 1 – Pietro Badoglio, Italian field marshal and 28th prime minister of Italy (b. 1871)
- November 2 – Leo Baeck, German rabbi, scholar and theologian (b. 1873)
- November 3 – Jean Metzinger, French painter, theorist and critic (b. 1883)
- November 5 – Art Tatum, American jazz pianist (b. 1909)
- November 6 – Albert F. Nufer, American diplomat and ambassador (b. 1894)
- November 10
  - Harry Ford Sinclair, American oil industrialist (b. 1876)
  - Victor Young, American composer (b. 1899)
- November 12 – Juan Negrín, 67th prime minister of Spain (b. 1892)
- November 19 – Francis L. Sullivan, English actor (b. 1903)
- November 22 – Theodore Kosloff, Russian-born ballet dancer, choreographer and actor (b. 1882)
- November 23 – André Marty, French Communist Party leader (b. 1886)
- November 24 – Guido Cantelli, Italian conductor (b. 1920)
- November 26 – Tommy Dorsey, American trombonist and bandleader (b. 1905)

=== December ===
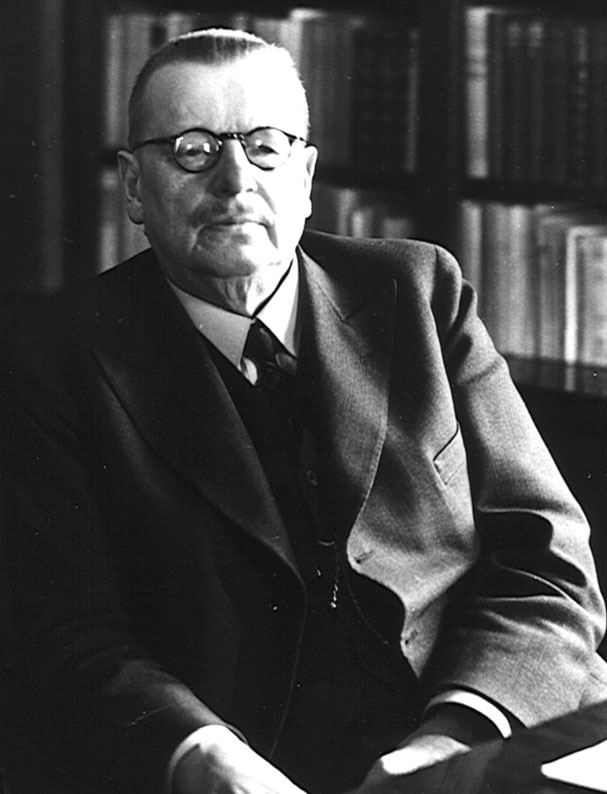
Juho Kusti Paasikivi

- December 2 – Dell Henderson, Canadian actor (b. 1877)
- December 3 – Alexander Rodchenko, Russian artist (b. 1891)
- December 6 – B. R. Ambedkar, Indian jurist and politician (b. 1891)
- December 9 – Charles Joughin, English-born baker on RMS Titanic (b. 1878)
- December 12 – E. A. Dupont, German film director (b. 1891)
- December 14 – Juho Kusti Paasikivi, twice Prime Minister of Finland and 7th president of Finland (b. 1870)
- December 16
  - René Couzinet, French aeronautics engineer and aircraft manufacturer (b. 1904)
  - Nina Hamnett, Welsh artist (b. 1890)
- December 17 – Eddie Acuff, American actor (b. 1903)
- December 21 – Lewis Terman, American psychologist (b. 1877)
- December 23 – Josep Puig i Cadafalch, Spanish architect (b. 1867)
- December 26
  - Holmes Herbert, English actor (b. 1882)
  - Preston Tucker, American automobile designer (b. 1903)

=== Date unknown ===
- Dumitru Coroamă, Romanian soldier and fascist activist (b. 1885)
- Victoria Hayward, Bermudan-born travel writer and journalist (b. 1876)
- Lotte Herrlich, female photographer of German naturism (b. 1883)

== Nobel Prizes ==

- Physics – William Shockley, John Bardeen, Walter Houser Brattain
- Chemistry – Sir Cyril Norman Hinshelwood, Nikolay Semyonov
- Physiology or Medicine – André Frédéric Cournand, Werner Forssmann, Dickinson W. Richards
- Literature – Juan Ramón Jiménez
- Peace – Not Awarded
