= Gnocchi (surname) =

Gnocchi is an Italian surname. Notable people with the surname include:

- Carlo Gnocchi (1902–1956), Italian priest, educator and writer
- Gene Gnocchi (born 1955), Italian television presenter, comedian and footballer
- Giovanni Pietro Gnocchi, Italian painter, active during the late 16th-century in Lombardy in a late-Renaissance or Mannerist styles
- Luigi Gnocchi (1933–2014), Italian sprinter
- Osvaldo Gnocchi-Viani (1837–1917), Italian journalist
- Pietro Gnocchi (1689–1775), Italian composer, choir director, historian, and geographer of the late Baroque era

== See also ==
- Don Gnocchi - L'angelo dei bimbi, Italian title of Father of Mercy, 2004 Italian television movie directed by Cinzia Th. Torrini based on real life events of Roman Catholic priest and then Blessed Carlo Gnocchi.
