= Beatriz Montañez =

Spanish TV presenter and actress (born 1977)

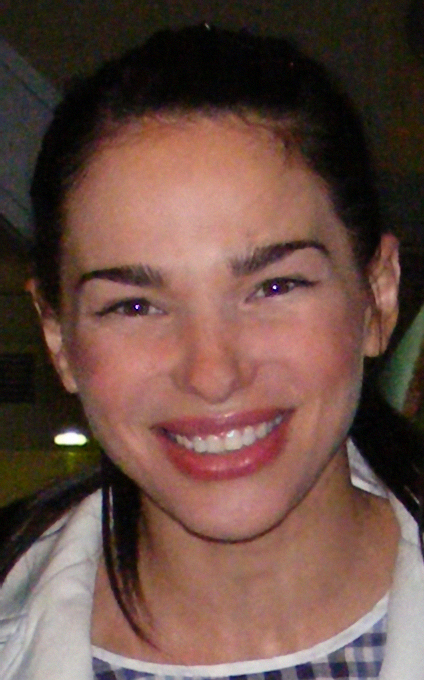
- Beatriz Montañez in 2009
- Born: Beatriz Montanez López; 3 June 1977 (age 48); Almadén, Castile-La Mancha, Spain
- Occupations: Actress and TV presenter
- Years active: 2006–present

Beatriz Montañez López (born 3 June 1977 in Almadén, Castile-La Mancha) is a Spanish TV presenter and actress.

== Biography ==
Montañez began working in the radio at Onda Mancha from Almadén (currently Cadena SER Almadén). Afterwards she went to the University of California, Los Angeles where she got a degree in journalism. At same time, Montañez worked in several Spanish language radio stations in the U.S., Telemundo and Radio KLVE among others.

Back in Spain, Montañez studied audiovisual communication and production at Institute of RTVE and made an online master at Harvard University.

In 2006, Montañez began to work in LaSexta's comedy news program El intermedio as a co-host alongside El Gran Wyoming. In 2011, she voluntarily left the program and was replaced by Sandra Sabatés.

In 2013, Montañez was hired by Telecinco to host alongside Jordi González the debate program El gran debate. In March, 2014 she hosted Hable con ellas, an interview TV-magazine at the same channel until July of the same year.

== Film ==
In 2011 she starred in the film 88, directed by Jordi Mollá. She also had a small role in the 2015 film comedy De chica en chica.

== Book ==
On March 15, 2021, she publishes the book "Niadela", where she talks about her new lifestyle, living isolated from society and in a humble shepherd's house in the mountains, living a frugal life and becoming vegan.
