= Daniele Liotti =

Italian actor

Daniele Liotti (born 1 April 1971, in Rome) is an Italian actor. He has performed in more than thirty films since 1993.

== Selected filmography ==
Film
Year	Title	Role	Notes
1996	Growing Artichokes in Mimongo	Sergio Baldini	
2001	Mad Love	Philip I of Castile	
2002	Stones	Kun	
2003	Life as It Comes	Max	
2003	The Fugitive	Massimo Carlotto	
2006	The Inquiry	Titus Valerius Taurus	
2010	The Valdemar Legacy		
2014	Sorry If I Call You Love	Alex	

TV
Year	Title	Role
2002	Saint Anthony: The Miracle Worker of Padua	Anthony of Padua
2004	Father of Mercy	Carlo Gnocchi
2007	Il Capo dei Capi	Biagio Schirò
2012	Il generale dei briganti	
2017	Un passo dal cielo	Francesco Neri
