= Thais Villas =

Spanish journalist and television presenter (born 1974)

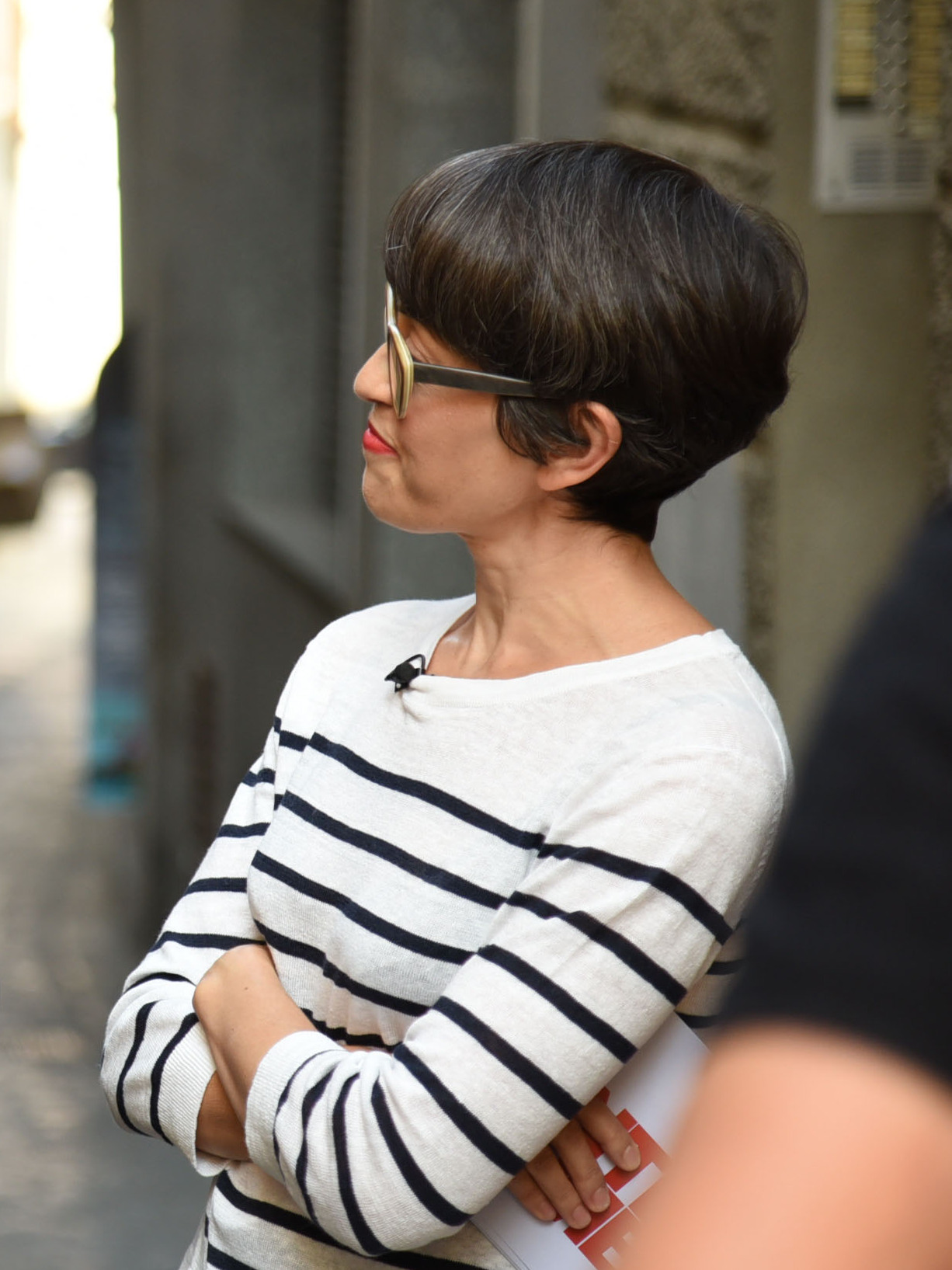
- Born: Thais Villas Aribau; October 2, 1974 (age 51); Fraga, Huesca, Spain
- Occupations: Journalist; television presenter; reporter
- Years active: 1990s–present
- Spouse: Òscar Dalmau (m. 2022)
- Children: 2

Thais Villas Aribau (born 2 October 1974) is a Spanish journalist and television presenter who has been the street reporter on the satirical news programme El intermedio (La Sexta) since the show's first broadcast in March 2006, making her the only member of the original cast still present after nearly two decades; her ironic street interviews with politicians outside the Congress of Deputies are among the most recognisable segments in Spanish satirical television. A graduate in Audiovisual Communication who studied in Barcelona, she worked in Catalan regional television and radio and at several Madrid broadcasters before joining La Sexta, and in 2019 simultaneously presented the feminist late-night programme Las que faltaban on Movistar+ and the panel show Control T on TV3; she is the sister of journalist and television director Santi Villas.

== Early life and education ==
Villas was born on 2 October 1974 in Fraga, a town of around 15,000 inhabitants in the comarca of Bajo Cinca, in the province of Huesca, Aragon. Fraga lies on the Aragonese-Catalan border and is bilingual in Spanish and Catalan. At the age of fifteen she was involved in a serious car accident that left lasting health consequences, including varicose veins that required surgery years later and that motivated a major change in her diet and approach to health.

She has described spending approximately two years unemployed during her early career, which she said affected her deeply.

== Career ==
=== Early television and radio work ===
Villas's first sustained television work was as a reporter on Les mil i una on TV3 during the late 1990s. She subsequently worked as a writer, producer and presenter on Última sessió (Betevé) and 4 i acció (TVE Catalunya), and contributed to several Catalan radio stations including Punto Radio, COM Ràdio, RAC1 and Catalunya Ràdio.

When work in Catalonia became scarce she relocated to Madrid, where she worked as a writer, producer and presenter on Abierto por la mañana (Telemadrid), as a crime reporter on El programa de Ana Rosa (Telecinco) and later as a reporter on Gran Hermano (also Telecinco), where she found more scope for her comedic sensibility. She has also contributed to the magazine Marie Claire.

=== El intermedio (2006–present) ===
In 2006, Villas auditioned for and was cast as a street reporter on El intermedio, the satirical current affairs programme on La Sexta presented by El Gran Wyoming. The programme debuted on 30 March 2006 and Villas has been part of its team ever since, making her the only original cast member still on air after nearly two decades.

Her core work on the programme consists of street interviews conducted primarily outside the Congress of Deputies in Madrid, catching politicians with unscripted questions that combine journalism and irony. She has described her method as one of sheer persistence: "I get things from them because I make them feel sorry for me."

Among the recurring segments she has led on the programme are El machistómetro (street surveys testing attitudes towards gender equality), Barrio rico, barrio pobre (reports comparing life in wealthy and working-class neighbourhoods), and from later seasons, Zetas y Boomers, which brings together people of different generations to contrast their views. During the COVID-19 lockdown in 2020, her young son Miró walked into a live television connection she was conducting from home; she handled the interruption matter-of-factly, saying only: "Go with your father."

=== Las que faltaban on Movistar+ (2019) ===
On 15 March 2019, Villas began presenting Las que faltaban, a late-night comedy programme on Movistar+'s channel #0, broadcast every Friday at 23:00. Produced by Globomedia and recorded live in front of an audience at the Uñas Chung Lee club in Madrid's Moncloa district, the show was created, written, directed and presented entirely by women and was described as the first feminist late-night programme in Spanish television history.

The programme grew out of criticism of Movistar+'s comedy output as overwhelmingly male-dominated, crystallised by a widely mocked group photograph taken at the FesTVal festival in Vitoria in September 2018 showing 17 male faces out of 19 presenters. Villas co-presented with collaborators including Susi Caramelo, Eva Soriano, Victoria Martín, Nerea Pérez de las Heras and Adriana Torrebejano. The programme ran for two seasons, concluding on 15 December 2019 after 24 episodes; upon its cancellation Villas commented publicly: "They are cancelling us. The best ones always leave."

=== Control T on TV3 (2019) ===
On 13 May 2019, Villas began presenting Control T, a prime-time panel show on TV3 combining humour with technology and the internet. Produced by DLO Magnolia and adapted from the Belgian format Control Pedro, each episode featured four celebrity guests competing in technology-related challenges, with scoring by Villas's "millennial nephew" Oriol Artola. The first season ran for 14 episodes. Villas described the programme as a return to TV3 after approximately twenty years away, only made possible by the show recording on Fridays.

=== Zapeando (2020–present) and other work ===
In November 2020, Villas joined the La Sexta entertainment programme Zapeando as an occasional collaborator. On her debut she joked that she had appeared in the pilot episode back in 2013 but had not been invited back.

In 2021, she presented Amor Gastronòmik, a dating programme based around cooking, for RTVE Catalunya broadcast on La 2.

== Personal life ==
Villas is married to Òscar Dalmau, a Catalan radio and television presenter best known for hosting El gran dictat on TV3 and La competència on RAC1. The couple had been in a relationship for several years before marrying on 28 November 2022 in a civil ceremony at the registry office in Barcelona with only two witnesses. They have two children: a daughter named Ia, born in 2015, and a son named Miró, born in 2019. The family lives in Barcelona, and Villas travels to Madrid for her work on El intermedio.

Villas has maintained a deliberately low public profile and has no personal social media accounts, which she described as a conscious choice. Her brother Santi Villas is also a journalist and television director, known for his work on El programa de Ana Rosa on Telecinco and as director of the RTVE late-night programme Late Xou.
