= Mediterranean Food =

- Directed by: Joaquín Oristrell
- Starring: Olivia Molina; Paco León
- Release date: 6 February 2009
- Running time: 1h 42min
- Country: Spain
- Language: Spanish

Mediterranean Food (Spanish: Dieta mediterránea) is a 2009 Spanish comedy film directed by Joaquín Oristrell.

== Cast ==
- Olivia Molina - Sofía
- Paco León - Toni
- Alfonso Bassave - Frank
- Carmen Balagué - Loren
- Roberto Álvarez - Ramón
- Jesús Castejón - Pepe Ripoll
- Jordi Martínez - Padrastro Frank
- Usun Yoon - Hoshi
- Dolo Beltrán - Lunes

== See also ==
- List of Spanish films of 2009
