= Usun Yoon =

South Korean TV host and reporter (born 1977)

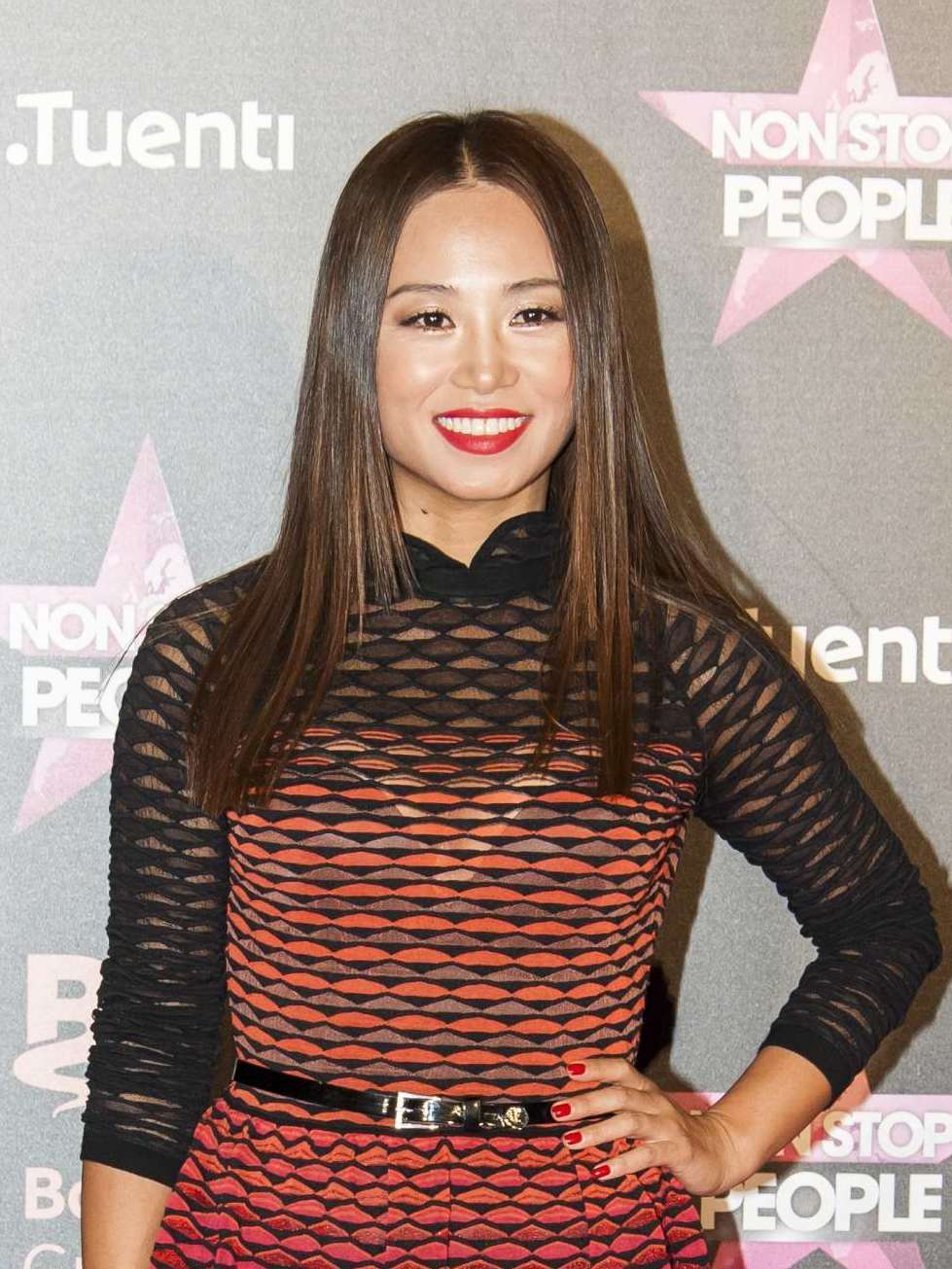
- Yoon in 2015
- Born: May 27, 1977 (age 49); Busan, South Korea

Korean name
- Hangul: 윤우선
- RR: Yun Useon
- MR: Yun Usŏn

Usun Yoon (Korean: 윤우선; born 27 May 1977) is a South Korean TV host, actress, and reporter based in Spain.

== Early life ==
Yoon was born in 1977 in Busan, South Korea. She studied Political Science, International relations and Linguistics at the Busan University of Foreign Studies from 1994 to 1996, and went to Toronto to follow her studies from 1996 to 1998. Yoon then studied drama at the Spanish company theatre "La Barraca" in Madrid from 2002 to 2004.

== Career ==
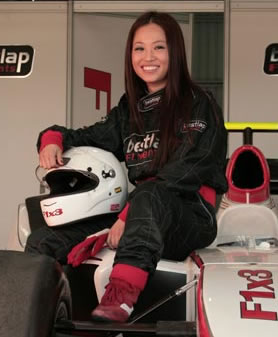
Yoon in an F1 single seater.

As a model, Yoon appeared in music videos for Alejandro Sanz, The Corrs, and Carlos Jean.

Yoon is well known in Spain for work on TV satirical news show El intermedio, on Spanish network La Sexta from 2007 to 2013.

== Filmography ==
=== Films ===
- 2003: Mala uva, Javier Domingo.
- 2003: Inconscientes, Joaquín Oristell
- 2003: La luna en botella
- 2003: Cosas que hacen que la vida valga la pena, Manuel Gómez Pereira
- 2005: Hotel Tívoli, Antón Reixa
- 2005: Torrente 3, Santiago Segura
- 2005: Un corte a su medida (short film), Aric Chetrit
- 2009: Mediterranean Food, Hoshi

=== TV ===
- Odiosas
- Motivos personales Tele 5
- Lobos Antena 3
- Manolito Gafotas Antena 3
- Las estupendas
- La sopa boba Antena 3
- Escenario Madrid
- Celebrity MasterChef España Season 2

==== As a reporter ====
- Punto y medio - 2003 / 2004 (Canal Sur)
- Ratones coloraos - 2004 / 2006 (Canal Sur)
- Campanadas de fin de año - 2011 / 2012 (La Sexta)
- El intermedio – 2007/2013 (La Sexta)
- Hable con ellas - 2014 (Telecinco)
