= Massimo Carlotto =

Italian writer & playwright (born 1956)

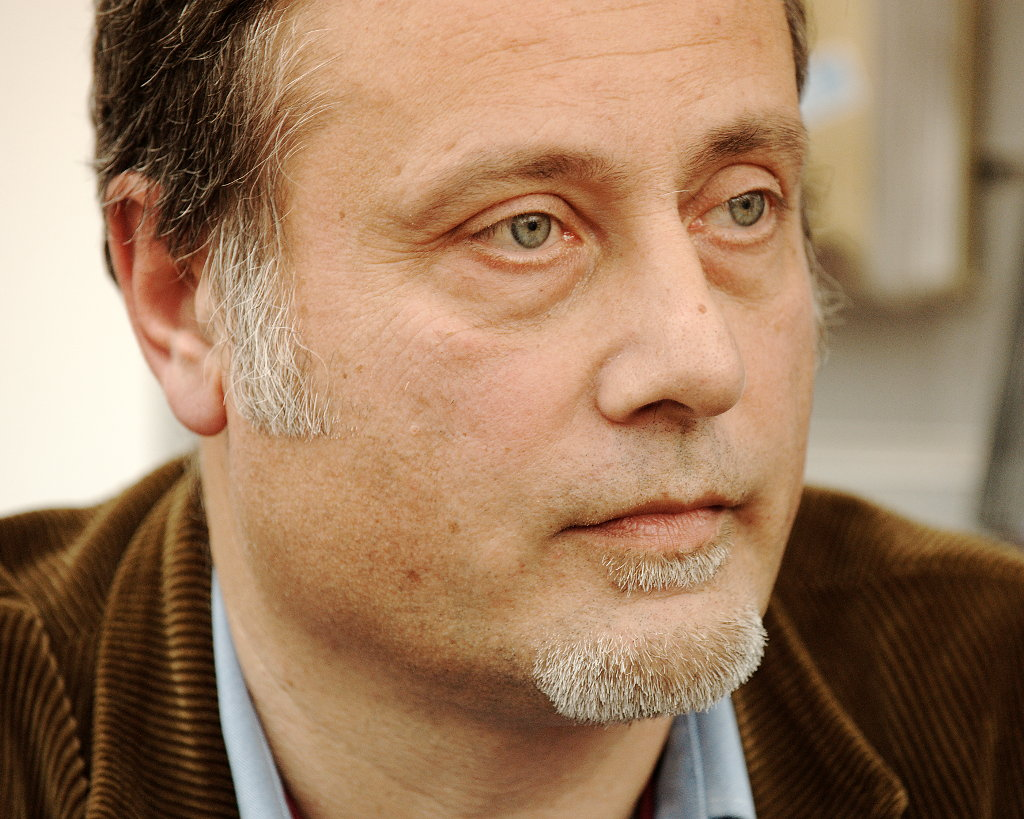
- Born: 22 July 1956; Padua, Italy
- Occupation: Novelist
- Writing career
- Period: 1995–current
- Genres: Crime fiction, noir, hardboiled, thriller
- Literary movement: New Italian Epic
- Website: massimocarlotto.it

Massimo Carlotto (born 22 July 1956) is an Italian writer and playwright.

== Biography ==
=== Murder accusation ===
Carlotto was at the center of one of the most controversial legal cases in Italian contemporary history.

In 1976, a 25-year-old student, Margherita Magello, was found dead at her home, killed by 59 stab wounds.

Carlotto, then a 19-year-old student member of Lotta Continua, happened upon the victim after hearing her cries. He found her bleeding and dying inside of a wardrobe. Instead of notifying the police, he panicked and fled. He was soon arrested and charged with homicide. He never wavered in maintaining his innocence.

In the first trial, he was acquitted for lack of evidence by the Criminal Court of Padua but was then sentenced upon appeal to 18 years imprisonment by the Appeals Court of Venice. This sentence was confirmed by the Supreme Court in 1982.

He became a fugitive, first in France and then in Mexico, where he was captured after three years on the run and extradited to Italy. A large popular movement took up Carlotto's cause; in addition, a number of prominent figures signed a petition on his behalf including Ettore Gallo, Jorge Amado, Nilde Iotti, Norberto Bobbio, Giandomenico Pisapia, and Ferdinando Imposimato.

In 1989, the Supreme Court ordered a retrial, sending the case back to the Court of Appeal of Venice to establish whether Carlotto should be acquitted in accordance with the old or the new penal code. In 1990, the question of constitutional legitimacy was raised. In 1991, the Italian Constitutional Court rendered its decision, but the President of the Court's retirement meant yet another trial was necessary, during which Carlotto, suffering from a serious metabolic disease, was sentenced to 16 years in prison. This new conviction violated, Carlotto's lawyers argued, the principle of double jeopardy/ne bis in idem.

Public opinion was on Carlotto's side and in 1993 the Italian President, Oscar Luigi Scalfaro, granted him a pardon.

== Writer ==
Massimo Carlotto began his literary career, particularly writing novels in the noir genre, with Il fuggiasco (The Fugitive, 1995), a fictionalized autobiography about his time on the run. The book was made into a film in 2003, directed by Andrea Manni, with Daniele Liotti as Carlotto.

His most famous character is the Alligator, alias Marco Buratti, an entirely original private detective.

In 1998 he published Le irregolari, the autobiographical novel of inquiry in which is told the Argentine civil war and repression of the seventies, during the so-called dirty war. He knows and has interviewed the founder of the Abuelas de Plaza de Mayo, Estela Carlotto, whom he transpired to be related to, and who sought news of her daughter and newborn grandson, who numbered among the desaparecidos.

In 2001 he released Arrivederci, amore ciao (which was adapted into the movie The Goodbye Kiss by Michele Soavi, 2005).

In 2004 he published L'oscura immensità della morte ("Death's Dark Abyss"), a particularly dark and nihilistic noir centered on the theme of revenge, which was adapted into the Hindi film Badlapur.

His books have been translated in France, Bulgaria, the United Kingdom, Germany, Spain, Greece, the Netherlands, the Czech Republic and the United States.

== Awards ==
- Premio del Giovedì (1996)
- Premio Dessì (1999)
- Premio Scerbanenco (1999)
- Premio Scerbanenco (2002)
- 2nd place Grand prix de littérature policière (2003)
- Premio Ciliegia d'oro (2003)
- Premio Lama e trama (2005)
- Finalist of Premio Bancarella (2006)
- Premio del Libraio – Città di Padova (2007)
- Finalist of Edgar Allan Poe Awards for Arrivederci amore ciao (The goodbye kiss, 2007)
- Premio Letterario Noir Ecologista Jean Claude Izzo (2009)
- Premio SUGARPRIZE (2013)

== Works ==
=== Novels ===
- Il fuggiasco, Rome, Edizioni e/o, 1995. ISBN 88-7641-237-9.
- La verità dell'Alligatore, Roma, Edizioni e/o, 1995. ISBN 88-7641-272-7.
- Il mistero di Mangiabarche, Roma, Edizioni e/o, 1997. ISBN 88-7641-309-X.
- Le irregolari. Buenos Aires horror tour, Roma, Edizioni e/o, 1998. ISBN 88-7641-337-5.
- Nessuna cortesia all'uscita, Roma, Edizioni e/o, 1999. ISBN 88-7641-378-2.
- Arrivederci amore, ciao, Roma, Edizioni e/o, 2001. ISBN 88-7641-443-6.
- L'oscura immensità della morte, Roma, Edizioni e/o, 2004. ISBN 88-7641-562-9.
- Niente, più niente al mondo, Roma, Edizioni e/o, 2004. ISBN 88-7641-635-8.
- with Marco Videtta, Nordest, Roma, Edizioni e/o, 2005. ISBN 88-7641-681-1.
- La terra della mia anima, Roma, Edizioni e/o, 2006. ISBN 88-7641-738-9.
- with Francesco Abate, Mi fido di te, Torino, Einaudi, 2007. ISBN 978-88-06-18255-7.
- L'alligatore, Roma, Edizioni e/o (I super e/o), 2007. ISBN 978-88-7641-795-5.
- Cristiani di Allah, Roma, Edizioni e/o, 2008. ISBN 978-88-7641-818-1.
- con i Mama Sabot, Perdas de Fogu, Roma, Edizioni e/o, 2008. ISBN 978-88-7641-841-9.
- con Francesco Abate, L'albero dei microchip, VerdeNero, 2009. ISBN 978-88-89014-90-5.
- L'amore del bandito, Roma, Edizioni e/o, 2009. ISBN 978-88-7641-873-0.
- Alla fine di un giorno noioso, Roma, Edizioni e/o, 2011. ISBN 978-88-7641-967-6.
- Respiro corto, Einaudi, Turin, 2012
- Cocaina (con Giancarlo De Cataldo e Gianrico Carofiglio), Torino, Einaudi, 2013. ISBN 978-88-06-21547-7
- with Marco Videtta, Le Vendicatrici. Ksenia, Torino, Einaudi, 2013. ISBN 978-88-06-21269-8
- with Marco Videtta, Le Vendicatrici. Eva, Torino, Einaudi, 2013. ISBN 978-88-06-21271-1
- with Marco Videtta, Le Vendicatrici. Sara: Il prezzo della verità, Torino, Einaudi, 2013. ISBN 978-88-06-22373-1
- with Marco Videtta, Le Vendicatrici. Luz: Solo per amore, Torino, Einaudi, 2013. ISBN 88-06-21270-2
- La banda degli amanti, Roma, Edizioni e/o, 2015, ISBN 978-88-66-32644-1

=== Short stories ===
- Il confronto, in Tecla Dozio (a cura di), Delitti sotto l'albero. Todaro editore, 1999. ISBN 978-88-86981-26-2.
- Champagne per due, in Tecla Dozio (a cura di), Capodanno nero. Todaro editore, 2000. ISBN 978-88-86981-34-7.
- Il viaggio di Stefano, in Tutta un'altra vita. Roma, Minimum Fax, 2001. ISBN 88-87765-47-2.
- Malavita albanese in Laura Lepri (a cura di), Albania, questa sconosciuta. In viaggio con il Premio Grinzane Cavour. Editori Riuniti, 2002.
- Carlo Marx e l'impresario, in Nel Grembo del mondo, Ed. Angolo Manzoni, 2003. ISBN 978-88-88838-05-2.
- Sassi, bottiglie e candelotti, in Paola Staccioli (a cura di), Piazza bella piazza, allegato a L'Unità. Roma, Associazione Walter Rossi, 2005. [ISBN unspecified]
- Gaia, in Laurent Lombard (a cura di), À table!. Métailié, 2004.
- San Basilio, 8 settembre 1974, in Paola Staccioli (a cura di), In ordine pubblico. Roma, Associazione Walter Rossi, 2005. [ISBN unspecified]
- Morte di un confidente, in Crimini, Einaudi, 2005. ISBN 978-88-06-18818-4.
- Il piccolo patriota padovano, in Giosuè Calaciura et al, Ricuore. Nuoro, Edizioni Il Maestrale, 2005. ISBN 88-86109-88-1.
- Il traghetto in Le finestre sul cortile. Frammenti d'Italia in 49 racconti. Quiritta, 2005. ISBN 978-88-8403-028-3.
- Sangue che va sangue che viene, in Marco Bariletti et al, Lama e trama Vol. 3. Bologna, Editrice Zona, 2006. ISBN 88-89702-30-3.
- Storia di Gabriella vedova di mala, in Serge Quadruppani (a cura di), 14 colpi al cuore. Racconti inediti dei migliori giallisti italiani. Milano, Mondadori, 2002 . Collana: Il Giallo Mondadori, n. 2789.
- Cuori rossi, in (a cura di) Marco Vichi. Città in nero, 1 ed. Parma, Ugo Guanda, 2006. ISBN 88-8246-939-5.
- Jasmine in Francesco Abate e Massimo Carlotto. Catfish. Reggio Emilia, Aliberti editore, 2006. ISBN 88-7424-124-0.
- Nessun dubbio: omicidio-suicidio, in Mauro Zola (a cura di), Ti amo, ti ammazzo. Storie vere di amanti e assassini, Cairo Editore, 2007
- Little dream, in Giancarlo De Cataldo (a cura di) Crimini italiani. Torino, Einaudi, 2008. ISBN 978-88-06-19002-6.
- Cortonese station, in Nero perugino. Perugia, Futura soc. coop., 2008 (edizione fuori commercio).
- A Carlo Giuliani, per il nostro domani, in Paola Staccioli (a cura di), Per sempre ragazzo. Racconti e poesie a dieci anni dall'uccisione di Carlo Giuliani, Marco Tropea editore, 2011

=== Essays ===
- Come un rito collettivo in Almanacco Guanda a cura di Ranieri Polese. Parma, Guanda, 2005.
- Patotas in Nessuna Pietà a cura di Luca Scarlini. Adriano Salani editore, Milan, 2009

=== Graphic novels ===
- Massimo Carlotto, Giuseppe Palumbo. L'ultimo treno. Edizioni BD, 2004. ISBN 88-87658-69-2.
- Massimo Carlotto, Luca Crovi & Andrea "Red" Mutti. Arrivederci amore, ciao, in Eraldo Baldini et al. Alta criminalità. Arnoldo Mondadori Editore, 2005. ISBN 978-88-04-54527-9.
- Massimo Carlotto, Igort. Dimmi che non-vuoi morire. Milan, Mondadori, 2007. ISBN 978-88-04-51809-9.
- Massimo Carlotto, Giuseppe Palumbo. Tomka. Il gitano di Guernica. Rizzoli, 2007. ISBN 978-88-17-01732-9.

=== Literature for young people ===
- Il giorno in cui Gabriel scoprì di chiamarsi Miguel Angel, 2001 ISBN 978-88-47-70664-4.
- Jimmy della Collina, 2002
- with Tinin Mantegazza, Il mistero dei bisonti scomparsi, 2010

=== English editions ===
- The Colombian Mule, English translation by Christopher Woodall, 2001 ISBN 978-16-09-45135-6.
- The Master of Knots, English translation by Christopher Woodall, 2002 ISBN 978-16-09-45180-6.
- The Goodbye Kiss, English translation by Lawrence Venuti, 2006 ISBN 978-19-33-37205-1.
- The Fugitive, English translation by Anthony Shugaar, 2007 ISBN 978-19-33-37225-9.
- Death’s Dark Abyss, English translation by Lawrence Venuti, 2007 ISBN 978-19-33-37218-1.
- Poisonville, English translation by Lawrence Venuti, 2009 ISBN 978-19-33-37291-4.
- Bandit Love, English translation by Anthony Shugaar, 2010 ISBN 978-19-33-37280-8.
- At the End of a Dull Day, English translation by Anthony Shugaar, 2013 ISBN 978-16-09-45114-1.
- Gang of Lovers, English translation by Anthony Shugaar, 2015 ISBN 978-16-09-45268-1.
- For All the Gold in the World, English translation by Anthony Shugaar, 2016 ISBN 978-16-09-45336-7.
- Cocaine, English translation by Shaun Whiteside, 2020 ISBN 978-18-48-66598-9.
- Blues for Outlaw Hearts and Old Whores, English translation by Will Schutt, 2020 ISBN 978-16-09-45569-9.
