= It's for Your Own Good (film) =

2017 Spanish comedy film

- Theatrical release poster
- Spanish: Es por tu bien
- Directed by: Carlos Therón
- Screenplay by: Manuel Burque; Josep Gatell
- Produced by: Ghislain Barrois; Álvaro Augustin; Eduardo Jiménez
- Starring: José Coronado; Javier Cámara; Roberto Álamo; Pilar Castro; María Pujalte; Carmen Ruiz; Silvia Alonso; Georgina Amorós; Andrea Ros; Miki Esparbé
- Cinematography: Miguel P. Gilaberte
- Edited by: Alberto de Toro
- Production companies: Telecinco Cinema; Quexito Films
- Distributed by: Buena Vista International
- Release date: 24 February 2017
- Running time: 93 minutes
- Country: Spain
- Language: Spanish

It's for Your Own Good (Spanish: Es por tu bien) is a 2017 Spanish comedy film directed by Carlos Therón and written by Manuel Burque and Josep Gatell which stars José Coronado, Javier Cámara, and Roberto Álamo.

== Cast ==
- José Coronado as Arturo
- Javier Cámara as Chus
- Roberto Álamo as Poli
- Pilar Castro as Isabel
- Carmen Ruiz as Alicia
- María Pujalte as Olga
- Silvia Alonso as Valentina
- Georgina Amorós as Marta
- Andrea Ros as Sarai
- Miki Esparbé as Álex
- Luis Mottola as Ernesto
- Miguel Bernardeau as Dani
- Manolo Solo as Juan
- Luis Callejo as Joaquín
- Manuel Burque as Camello
- María Hervás as Jazmín

== Release ==
Distributed by Buena Vista International, the film was theatrically released in Spain on 24 February 2017. It did well at the domestic box office, opening with a €1.5 million weekend, and grossing a total over €9 million.

== See also ==
- List of Spanish films of 2017
