= Manuel Burque =

Spanish screenwriter, radio host, comedian and actor

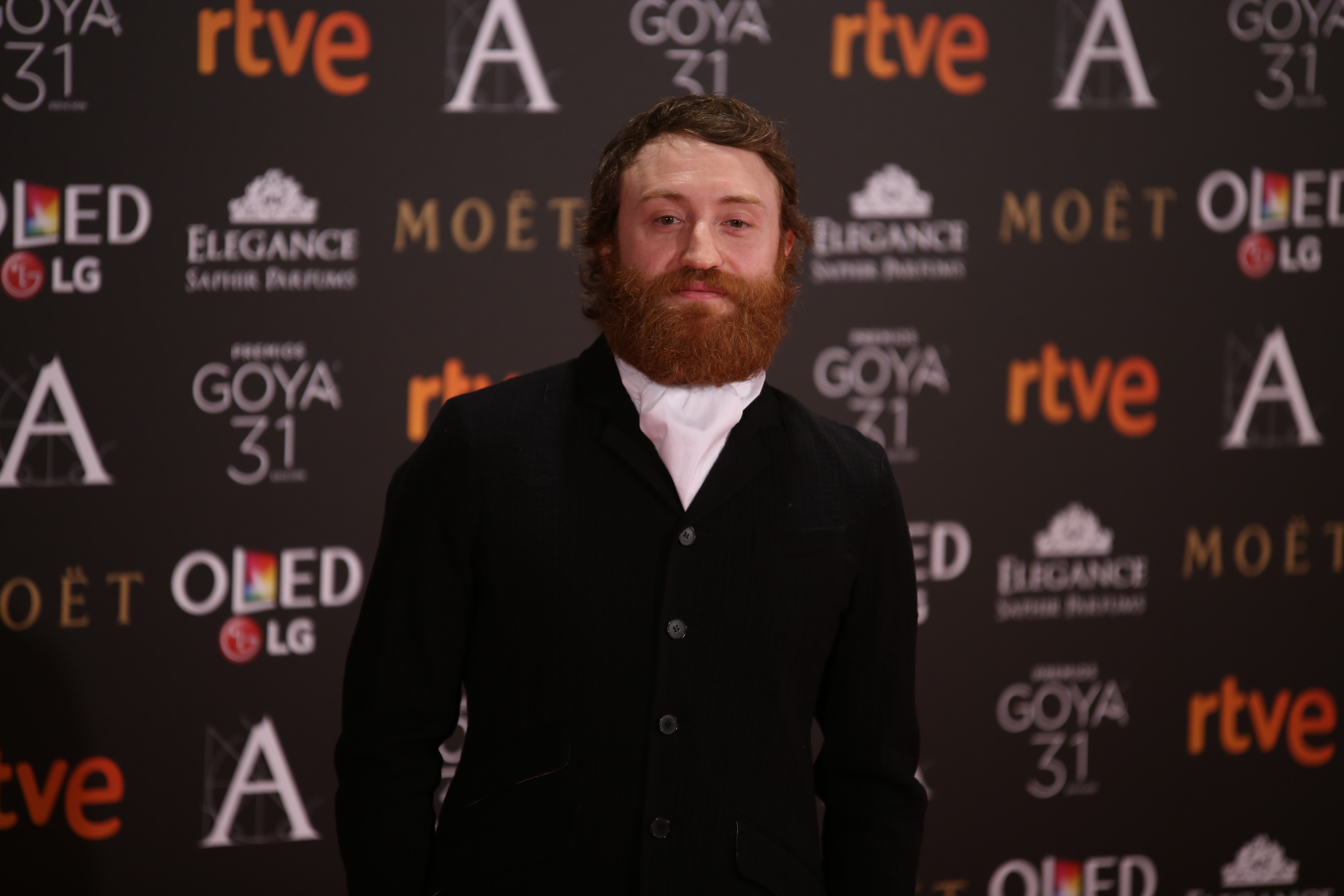
- Born: Manuel Burque Hodgson; 1980 (age 45–46); Santa Cruz de Tenerife, Spain
- Education: Pontifical University of Salamanca
- Occupations: Radio host; comedian; screenwriter; actor

Manuel Burque Hodgson (born 1980) is a Spanish screenwriter, radio host, comedian and actor.

== Biography ==
Manuel Burque Hodgson was born in Santa Cruz de Tenerife in 1980 and was raised in Galicia. He earned a degree in audiovisual communication from the Pontifical University of Salamanca. He earned popularity in 2011 by passing as an Intereconomía reporter in an interview with La Sexta's CEO José Miguel Contreras for El intermedio. His performance in the 2015 film Requirements to Be a Normal Person earned him a nomination to the Goya Award for Best New Actor.

Burque has also penned or co-penned the screenplays of the films, Sorry If I Call You Love, It's for Your Own Good, Undercover Wedding Crashers, and Tad, the Lost Explorer and the Emerald Tablet as well as the television series Perfect Life.

Since 2018, Burque hosts the Cadena SER show Buenismo bien alongside Quique Peinado and Henar Álvarez.
