= On the Line (2022 film) =

2024 thriller film

- Poster
- Directed by: Romuald Boulanger
- Written by: Romuald Boulanger
- Produced by: Romuald Boulanger; Robert Ogden Barnum; Marc Frydman
- Starring: Mel Gibson; William Moseley; Alia Seror O'Neill; Nadia Fares; Enrique Arce; Paul Spera; Kevin Dillon
- Cinematography: Xavier Castro
- Edited by: Pierre-Marie Croquet
- Music by: Clement Perin
- Distributed by: Saban Films
- Release date: November 4, 2022
- Running time: 104 minutes
- Country: United States
- Language: English

On the Line is a 2022 American thriller film written, produced, and directed by Romuald Boulanger and starring Mel Gibson.

== Plot ==
Los Angeles shock jock Elvis Cooney leaves his wife and daughter to go to work at KLAT during the midnight slot. He is introduced to the new intern, Dylan, on whom he plays a prank at the start of his shift. Elvis runs his radio show with Mary, his switchboard operator. After being on the air for a while, Elvis receives a call from a man named Gary, who claims to be at Elvis's house and holding his wife and daughter, Olivia and Adria, hostage. When Elvis threatens to take Gary off the air, Gary says he will kill Elvis's family.

Gary proceeds to explain that Elvis was responsible for a previous switchboard operator, Lauren, taking her own life due to Elvis's attitude and crude jokes towards her. Gary gets Elvis to admit on the air that he has slept with Mary. He then tells him to go up on the roof and jump. Dylan, Mary, and studio worker Steven follow. Dylan tries to trick Gary into believing that Elvis has jumped off the roof, but a drone outside is recording everything. Elvis then hears two gunshots go off and assumes his family is dead.

On his way out of the studio, Gary's voice comes over the speakers and says that his family is still alive and somewhere in the building with him. Elvis then realizes that Gary has been in the studio the whole time and sent him on a wild goose chase so he would have time to kill the security guard at the front, hide in the building, and rig the whole place to explode. Gary says that Elvis has 40 minutes to find him before everyone dies. Elvis and Dylan make their way through the building and try to find Gary, Olivia, and Adria. Along the way, they run into Tony, an old friend of Elvis who has been secretly stealing computers from the building. Gary orders Elvis to kill him, but he lets him go, and they move on.

When they are led to a false hiding place, Gary reveals that he can see them through the security cameras. Elvis leads Dylan, via a route without security cameras, to the control room where they find not Gary but Justin — a host with the time slot that Elvis wants — with a bullet in his head. Gary then reveals that he is now in the recording studio with a restrained Mary and Steven. After successfully earning ten more minutes on the clock, Elvis and Dylan make their way back to the studio via another secret route. When they reach upstairs, they see Tony hanging by the neck in the hallway.

Elvis is able to apprehend Gary with a box cutter, but Gary reveals that he is holding a dead man's switch and that Olivia and Adria are on the terrace with bomb vests strapped to their bodies. Gary then receives a call from Bruce, a member of the LAPD SWAT team, who says he is on the terrace and unable to disarm the devices. Gary then demands a trade: Olivia and Adria go free, and Dylan takes their place.

Forced to comply, Bruce deactivates the vests with Gary's help and brings them down to the studio, reactivating them on Dylan. Gary then shoots Bruce in the head and drops the dead man's switch as everyone looks on in horror only to have nothing happen.

Elvis and Gary then burst out laughing and embracing as everyone thought to be dead re-emerges, alive and well. It is then revealed that the whole situation was a prank played by the whole studio on Dylan, who appears shocked and horrified. After Elvis explains everything, he tries to get a reaction from Dylan, who leaves in silence. Elvis and his crew chase him out the door, holding the mic out to him, and Dylan falls backward down the stairs, cracking his head open and seemingly dying on impact.

The next morning, a distraught Elvis exits the studio and swears that he is done with radio. It is then revealed that Dylan, whose real name is Max, is a stunt worker and faked his own death as part of a prank by the whole radio station whose one and only real victim appears to be Elvis, in order to celebrate his birthday, which he claimed everyone forgot. Elvis is glad to see Dylan/Max alive, and he jokingly tells his co-workers to watch out, because his revenge prank will be far worse.

== Cast ==
- Mel Gibson as Elvis Cooney
- Kevin Dillon as Justin
- Enrique Arce as Tony
- William Moseley as Dylan
- Nadia Farès as Sam Dubois
- Alia Seror O'Neill as Mary
- Paul Spera as Gary/James
- Nancy Tate as Olivia

== Production ==
Filming began in Paris, France on June 9, 2021.

== Release ==
In May 2022, it was announced that Saban Films acquired American rights to the film, which was released in November 2022.

== Reception ==
On the review aggregator website Rotten Tomatoes, 20% of 25 critics' reviews are positive, with an average rating of 4/10. The website's consensus reads: "On the Line starts with a solid concept, but it's quickly undone by a story that stumbles over its own twists on the way to a disaster of an ending."
