= Enrique Arce =

Spanish television and film actor

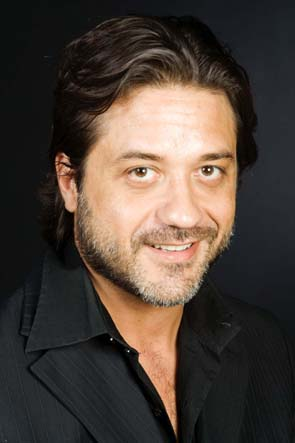
- Born: Enrique Javier Arce Temple; 8 October 1972 (age 53); Valencia, Spain
- Occupation: Actor
- Years active: 1996–present
- Spouse: Cristina Peña (divorced)
- Partner: Gemma Mengual (2005–08)

Enrique Javier Arce Temple (born October 8, 1972) is a Spanish television and film actor.

== Biography ==
Arce was born in Valencia, Spain on 8 October 1972. He originally went to university to study law, but during his fourth year, he decided to move into acting. He won Ellos i Elles, a Valencian television show on Canal Nou, and used the 2 million pesetas (circa £10,000/ $15,000) prize money to pay for his studies at the American Academy of Dramatic Arts. He has developed his career in Spain and abroad.

=== Personal life ===
He was married to the actress Cristina Peña, and lived with Olympic synchronised swimmer Gemma Mengual from 2005 to 2008.

== Career ==
=== Cinema ===
==== Feature films ====
- El corazón del guerrero (2000)
- Menos es más (2000)
- One of the Hollywood Ten (2000)
- Fidel (2002)
- Beyond Re-Animator (2003)
- Schubert (2005)
- Manolete (2007)
- Arte de Roubar (2008)
- 9 Meses (2010)
- Iron Cross (2010)
- Dioses y perros (2014)
- A Long Way Down (2014)
- Bad Investigate (2018)
- Tango One (2018)
- Terminator: Dark Fate (2019)
- Kobiety Mafii II (2019)
- Small World (2021)
- On the Line (2022)
- Murder Mystery 2 (2023)

==== Short films ====
- Cachito mío (2001)
- Gris (2003)
- ¿Y si hacemos un trío? (2004)
- Cuco Gomez-Gomez Is Dead! (2005)
- Matando al gato (2006)

=== Television ===
==== Continuous roles ====
- Petra Delicado (1999) as Pérez
- Periodistas (2000–2001) as Edu Cabrera
- Compañeros (2001–2002) as Javier Quevedo
- Tirando a dar (2006) as Paco
- Génesis: En la mente del asesino (2007) as Julián Balaguer
- Sin tetas no hay paraíso (2008) as Santiago Navarro
- Singles (2008) as Fran
- Tarancón. El quinto mandamiento (2010) as Father Redó
- Física o Química (2010–2011) as professor Arturo Ochando
- Amar en tiempos revueltos (2012) as Emilio Álcazar
- El tiempo entre costuras (2012–)
- L'Alqueria Blanca (2012–) as Raúl
- Knightfall (2017–2019) as Rodrigo of Catalonia
- La casa de papel (Money Heist) (2017–2021) as Arturo Román
- El refugio atómicol (Billionaires' Bunker) (2025) as Oswaldo

==== Episodic roles ====
- Al salir de clase (1997)
- Policías, en el corazón de la calle (2000)
- Una nueva vida (2003)
- Fuera de control (2006)
- Cuéntame cómo pasó (2006)
- R.I.S. Científica (2007) as Félix
- Cuéntame de sexo (2007–2008) as Álvaro

=== Theatre ===
- La Celestina
- Bodas de sangre
- Cuando llegue tu momento
- Como gustéis
- Every year at Carnival
- The cashier
- Cat among the pigeons
- Otelo
- Danny and the deep blue see
- Journey of the firth horse
- La cándida Erendira
- Bodas de sangre
- La vida es sueño
- A doctor's call
- El león en invierno (2007)
- Don Juan, el burlador de Sevilla
- Juegos de Hollywood
