= Cristina Peña =

Spanish actress

- Born: Cristina Peña Raigal; 27 July 1976 (age 48); Granada, Spain
- Occupation: Actress
- Years active: 1998–present
- Spouse(s): Enrique Arce (div.); Livio Lo Monaco
- Children: 2

Cristina Peña Raigal (born 27 July 1976) is a Spanish stage, film, and television actress.

== Biography ==
She studied at the Juan Carlos Corazza school. She began in the interpretation with small roles on films and TV series (Manos a la obra, Médico de familia or El comisario).

Her first major role was as the protagonist in the 2001 short film Dame cambio. The same year Peña filmed the TV series Compañeros (Antena 3) and took part in the series until 2002, becoming a well known face to the audience. Peña then acted in several roles in film and television, for example 7 vidas (Telecinco), until 2006, when she collaborated on the TV program El Intermedio (LaSexta). After she returned to the television series.

=== Personal life ===
She was formerly married to the actor Enrique Arce. Peña has one daughter with musician Pachi Delgado. She is married with businessman Livio Lo Monaco with whom she had a daughter, Adriana (2012).

== Filmography ==
=== Films ===
- Gitano (2000, as Prostitute)
- Dame Cambio (2001, as Vanesa)
- Peor imposible, ¿qué puede fallar? (2002, as Chica calle tarde)
- Cuestión de química (2007)
- Trío de ases: el secreto de la Atlántida (2008, as Salimbna)

=== Television ===
- Médico de familia (1999)
- Al salir de clase (1999, as Michelle)
- El comisario (1999 – 2002, as Adela / Ana / Charlie's friend)
- Compañeros (2001 – 2002, as Jose)
- Tres son multitud (2003, as Bárbara Montes)
- Casi Perfectos (2004 – 2005, as Carmen)
- Aída (2005, as Remedios)
- Obsesión (2005)
- 7 vidas (2005 – 2006, as Irene)
- LEX (2008, as Sara Segovia)
- El Intermedio (2006–2008)
- Somos cómplices (2009, as Soledad Méndez)
- Las chicas de oro (2010)
- Alfonso, el príncipe maldito (2010, as Carmen Martínez-Bordiú)
- Seis motivos para dudar de tus amigos (2011)
- Los misterios de Laura (2011–present, as Verónica Lebrel)
- BuenAgente (2011)
- Gran Reserva (2013, as forensics)
- Bienvenidos al Lolita (2014–present, as Norma)

== Theater ==
- The Pelopidas
- A la caza de la extranjera
- La otra costilla
- La casa de Bernarda Alba
- Así en los parques como en el cielo
- 5 mujeres.com (2005)
- Hombres, mujeres y punto (2006)
- The Taming of the Shrew (2009)
- Rumors (2011)
- Se infiel y no mires con quién (2011)
- Violines y trompetas (2012)
- Ni contigo... Sin ni Ti' (2012)
