= Sandra Sabatés =

Spanish journalist and TV presenter (born 1979)

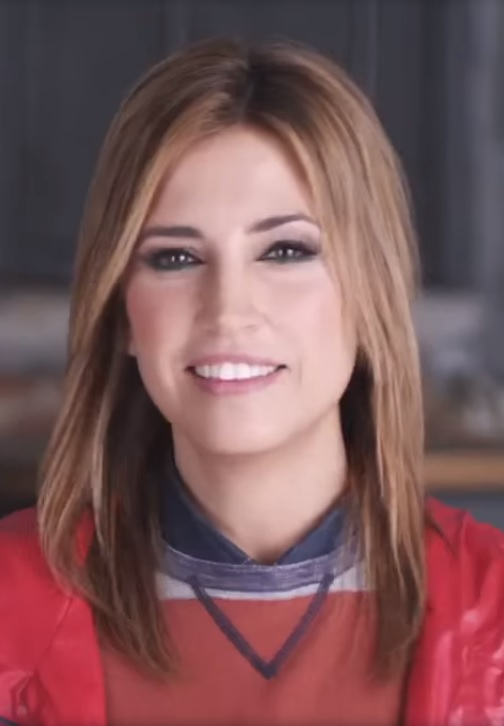
- Born: Sandra Sabatés; July 29, 1979 (age 47); Granollers, Catalonia, Spain
- Education: Pompeu Fabra University
- Occupation: Journalist
- Known for: LaSexta

Sandra Sabatés (Granollers, 29 July 1979) is a Spanish journalist and TV presenter.

She studied Audiovisual Communication at Pompeu Fabra University in Barcelona. She attended the private Escola Pia in Granollers as a child. She began to work as presenter on L'Hospitalet's local TV channel and later presented the news on TVE Catalunya, and, finally, she presented a sport program on LaSexta. Since January 2012, she has been co-presenting the TV series El Intermedio with Spanish comedian El Gran Wyoming.
