= Henar Álvarez =

Spanish journalist

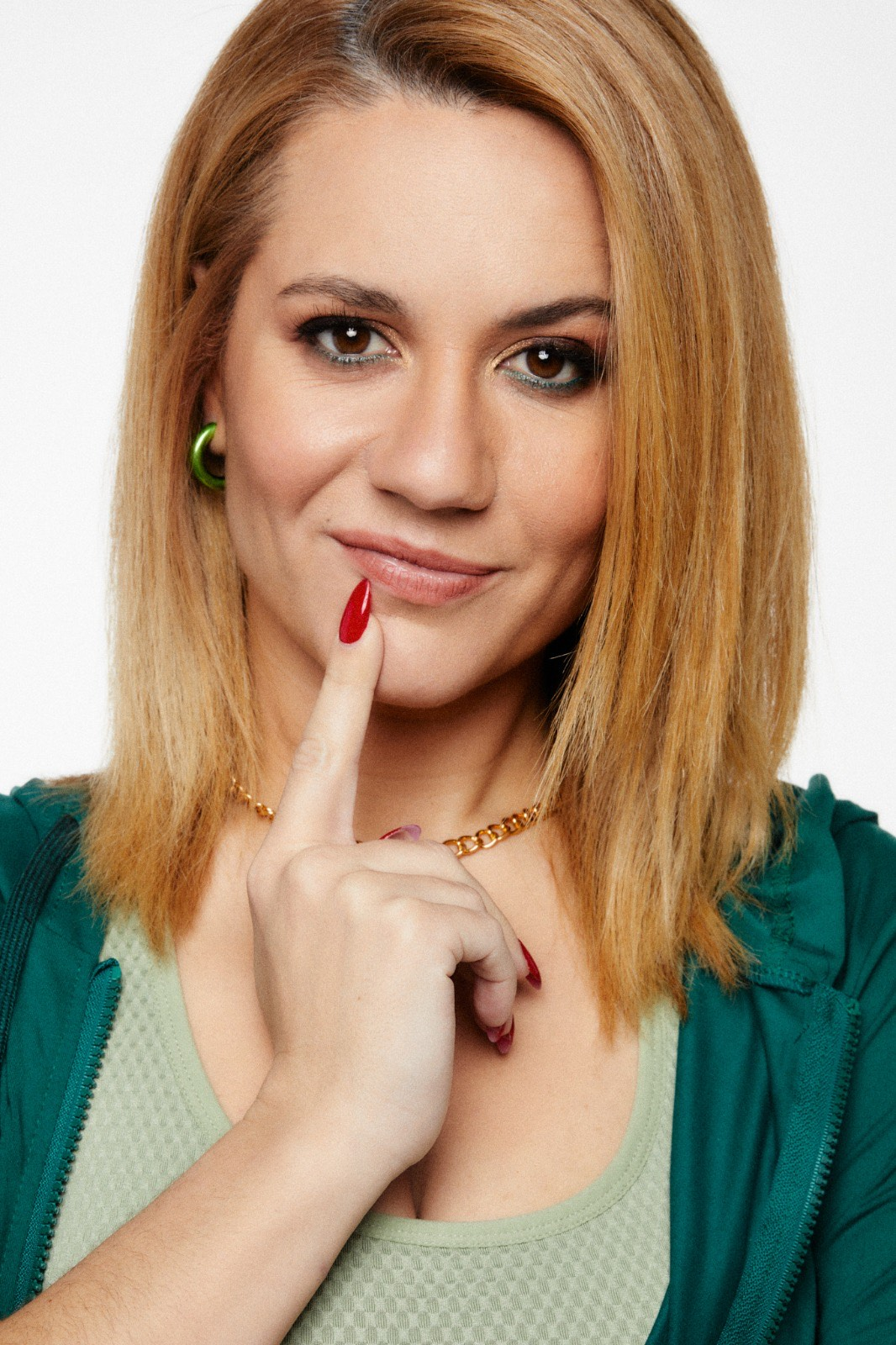
- Henar Álvarez in 2023
- Born: Henar Álvarez Díaz; 15 September 1984 (age 41); Madrid, Spain
- Occupations: Journalist and scriptwriter

Henar Álvarez Díaz (Madrid, Spain; September 15, 1984) is a Spanish scriptwriter and comedian who co-hosts the Cadena SER radio show Buenismo bien. She was a scriptwriter and collaborator on the Movistar+ platform's #0, Las que faltaban.

== Trajectory ==
She studied Audiovisual Communication at the Universidad Rey Juan Carlos, where she graduated in 2007. She completed a Master's Degree in Integral Communication at the University of Alcalá, which she finished in 2009.

In 2013, she became the presenter of the program Días de cine broadcast by La 2 of Televisión Española, after the departure of actress Cayetana Guillén Cuervo in 2011 and without having been replaced in those years. However, at the end of the 2014 broadcast season, Álvarez was replaced by journalist Elena Sánchez.

In 2014, Álvarez and her team of bloggers won the X Bitácoras Awards for the best film and television blog, La culpa es del script. Since 2003, RTVE and other groups like La Casa Encendida, ADman Media, ALSA, ESET, Repsol, HotelsCombined, interQué, Strato and AgoraNews, have given this award to the best Hispanic bloggers in different categories every year.

In the summer of 2018, Álvarez co-directed and presented the feminist program Tramas maestras on Cadena SER with film director Leticia Dolera and humorist Pilar de Francisco, which examined the figure of women as objects of desire in the film industry. This PRISA program offered listeners a space in which to learn about the influence of films and series on social narrative from a humorous and gender perspective. The first program, which could be listened to and also watched via streaming on Friday, June 8, 2018, went viral and achieved in a few hours more than 20,000 views on YouTube.

She has been a contributor to the Cadena SER radio program Buenismo Bien, hosted by actor Manuel Burque and journalist Quique Peinado, since June 2018, and was a scriptwriter for Las que faltaban, which aired on Movistar+'s #0 until December 2019. She was also a scriptwriter for Hoy por hoy until March 2019 and Likes, where she conducted the section FeminaCine, where she analyzed the stereotypes of women in the history of cinema. She also collaborated until March 2019 as a columnist for the newspaper El Confidencial, where she also had the feminist blog Con dos ovarios for her style section, Vanitatis.

In March 2019, she debuted as a monologuist in the program Late motiv, hosted by Andreu Buenafuente, for which she received much praise from people like Bob Pop, Quique Peinado, or Leticia Dolera, and whose video went viral, making Álvarez one of the most visible voices of female humor in Spain. In August of that same year, she starred in a spot for the Swedish furniture company IKEA together with Óscar Broc, also a Twitter user, in which they both made spoilers for some of the most striking pages of the catalog that had just been launched.

In 2020, Álvarez published, together with illustrator Ana Müshell, a graphic novel titled La mala leche, which addresses motherhood and sexuality from a feminist perspective. On November 17, the same day the book went on sale, Secuoya Studios announced that it had acquired the rights to the comic to make it into a series of half-hour episodes.

In 2024 she will host Al cielo con ella, an entertainment TV program similar to a late show, alongside Victoria Martín and Mister Jägger.

== Work ==
- 2020 – La mala leche. Together with the illustrator Ana Müshell. ISBN 9788408234562.
