= El Intermedio =

- Genre: News satire
- Created by: Miguel Sánchez Romero
- Written by: Marco Mas
- Directed by: Miguel Sánchez Romero (2006–2016); Carmen Aguilera (2016–present)
- Presented by: El Gran Wyoming (2006–2027); Gonzo (2027)
- Starring: Thais Villas; Dani Mateo; Andrea Ropero; Cristina Gallego; Isma Juárez; Raúl Pérez; Guillermo Fesser; Joaquín Reyes; Mikel Herrán; Inés Rodríguez
- Narrated by: Juan Ochoa
- Theme music composer: Juan Carlos Cuello (2006–2022, 2025–present)
- Opening theme: Give Me a Break by Juan Carlos Cuello (2006–2022, 2025–present) "Want Me Back" by Cody Fry, Cory Wong & Dynamo (2024–2025)
- Country of origin: Spain
- Original language: Spanish
- No. of seasons: 20
- No. of episodes: 3,021

Production
- Editor: Carmen Aguilera (2006–2016)
- Running time: 75 minutes (with adverts)

Original release
- Network: LaSexta
- Release: 30 March 2006 – present

El Intermedio (The Intermission in Spanish) is a Spanish news satire television program produced by Globomedia and broadcast on LaSexta since 2006. It was created by Miguel Sánchez Romero, who created similar successful comedy shows such as El club de la comedia, Noche Hache and 59 segundos.

The program has been hosted since 2006 by El Gran Wyoming, and was originally co-hosted by Beatriz Montañez until 2011, and since then by Sandra Sabatés. It is aired in access prime-time from Monday to Thursday at 9:30pm: Originally the show was broadcast five days a week but it was changed in 2010.

Currently the show has nine main collaborators: Sandra Sabatés, Thais Villas, Dani Mateo, Joaquín Reyes, Guillermo Fesser, Álvaro Carmona, Iván Lagarto, Manuel Burque, Andrea Ropero and Sara Escudero. Its production team is composed of more than forty people. It also remains the only programme on LaSexta to have been aired continuously since its beginning.

The show's theme tune until 2022, called "Give me a break", was composed especially for the program by Juan Carlos Cuello and produced by Sound Garden Producciones. Indeed, the show is marketed around the world as "The Break", yet has not attracted international versions, and the US show The Break with Michelle Wolf is unrelated if similar in style.

The writers are Alberto López, Alberto González Vázquez, Lola Zambade, Eva Nuño Gómez, Nuria Dominguez, Diego Solanas, Eduardo García Eyo, Sergio Sarria Ruiz, Juan José López and Miguel Ángel Hernández. Alberto González Vázquez is also the author of the popular segment videos manipulados (counterfeit videos).

On 5 November 2026, it was announced that El Gran Wyoming would retire at the start of 2027, and would be replaced on El Intermedio by collaborator Gonzo.

== Cast ==
=== Presenters ===
- El Gran Wyoming (The Great Wyoming in Spanish)- presenter)-(since 2006)
- Sandra Sabatés- (co presenter)-(since 2012)

=== Current collaborators ===
- Thais Villas-(since 2006)
- Dani Mateo-(since 2011)
- Joaquín Reyes-(since 2014–2015; since 2016)
- Guillermo Fesser-(since 2016)
- Manuel Burque-(2011; since 2017)
- Santi Villas-(since 2017)
- Andrea Ropero-(since 2019)
- Sara Escudero-(since 2019)

=== Former collaborators ===
- Usun Yoon- (2006–2013; 2018 (last program: 20 December 2018)).
- Yolanda Ramos- (2006–2008).
- Cristina Peña- (2006–2008)
- África Luca de Tena- (2008–2009)
- Lara Ruiz- (2008–2009)
- Tania Llasera- (2009– 2010)
- Jianyang Huang "Chayanne" – (2013)- (usual edition ¬international edition).
- Fernando González "Gonzo"- (2010– 2019).

=== Former presenters ===
- Juana Bonet – substitute presenter and Fridays' presenter.
- Pablo Carbonell – Fridays' presenter.
- Andreu Buenafuente – (2009) – substitute presenter.
- Beatriz Montañez – (2006–2011) – co presenter.
- Dani Mateo – (2013) – presenter of the International Edition.

== History ==
It hit the small screen on 30 March 2006 in la Sexta, and since then, together with Sé lo que hicisteis... and Late Motiv, is part of a group of programs of this channel dedicated to hot news and related subjects, apart from being, in conjunction with the previously mentioned shows, one of the most watched programs.

It is a humorous program of current issues that started being weekly -(2 hours of duration)- and that, later, move on to be on emission from Mondays to Thursdays -(during an hour)-.

In its first season (spring of 2006), as a weekly recorded program; had as collaborators Javier Cansado, Juan Luis Galiardo and Jimmy Barnatán.

Since the season 2006–2007, as a live daily program, El Gran Wyoming presented the program in collaboration with Beatriz Montañez, Thais Villas, Yolanda Ramos, Cristina Peña and Usun Yoon.

In September 2008, Yolanda Ramos and Cristina Peña left the program and two new collaborators joined it: África Luca de Tena and the Argentinian Lara Ruiz. Besides, the show increased its daily emissions to Friday's night. At the beginning, the program was hosted by Pablo Carbonell. In February 2009, the program counted on the incorporation of Juanra Bonet(who had been co-presenter of CQC months earlier, when the show was retired from emission), in substitution of Pablo Carbonell in Friday's emission.

In September 2009; on the verge of the beginning of a new season, it was confirmed the abandonment of Lara Ruiz and África Luca de Tena and the incorporation of Tania Llasera as new reporter, substituting those aforementioned.

On 21 October 2009, the program started emitting in 16:9. On 3 December 2009, Andreu Buenafuente and El Gran Wyoming, exchanged their programs for a day, presenting Buenafuente Wyoming's program, and vice versa.

On 17 February 2010, it was published the new of Tania Llasera abandoning the show after signing up with Telecinco. In March 2010, Fridays’ edition was cancelled and, instead, la Sexta, started to emit films, which caused the leaving of Juanra Bonet.

On 1 September 2010, the show started its new season using a completely new set and incorporating to its collaborators Fernando González "Gonzo".

On 29 August 2011, a new season was released, counting on Dani Mateo as a new member of the show.

On 21 December 2011, Beatriz Montañez left the program and Sandra Sabatés substitutes her since 9 January 2012.

On 27 June 2013, Usun Yoon saw off tho the program after 7 seasons to focus on her career as an actress.

In February 2014, Joaquín Reyes incorporated to teamwork to carry out his parodies of well-known characters of the Spanish politics.

On 9 November 2016, Guillermo Fesser joins the show, carrying out his usual collaborations in the program from the United States, coinciding with Donald Trump's victory in the Presidential elections in this country.

== Audience ==
El intermedio has a robust health when talking about audiences. Currently, it has a television rating that oscillates between 8–9%, which is above the average of the channel, achieving peaks of over 2 million spectators.

Its historical record of viewers corresponds to the emission of the Monday 25 May 2015, with 3.291.000 spectators, (17.4% of share), the day after the Local elections and with the visit of the candidate to Madrid's City Hall Manuela Carmena.

However, its historical record of share was registered during the program on Tuesday, 26 May 2015, with 17.6% of television ratings.

These have been the average audiences of the fourteen seasons of the show El intermedio.

- Bold: most watched season.

Season	Release	End	Average audience	
Season	Release	End	Spectators	Share
Weekly	30 March 2006	30 May 2006	67.000	0.7%
1	11 September 2006	28 June 2007	360.000 (Until December 2006) 758.000 (From January to July 2007)	2.5% (Until December 2006) 5.2% (From January to July 2007)
2	17 September 2007	10 July 2008	992.000	5.9%
3	8 September 2008	7 July 2009	947.000	5.8%
4	31 August 2009	8 July 2010	1.097.000	6.0%
5	1 September 2010	30 June 2011	1.133.000	6.1%
6	29 August 2011	28 June 2012	1.166.000	6.1%
7	3 September 2012	27 June 2013	1.892.000	9.8%
8	2 September 2013	26 June 2014	2.202.000	11.5%
9	1 September 2014	2 July 2015	**2,398,000**	**12.8%**
10	7 September 2015	30 June 2016	2.197.000	11.8%
11	5 September 2016	29 June 2017	1.828.000	10.1%
12	4 September 2017	28 June 2018	1.912.000	10.3%
13	3 September 2018	27 June 2019	1.641.000	9.3%
14	2 September 2019	2 July 2020	1 598 000	8,5%
15	7 September 2020	1 July 2021	1 403 000	8,3%
16	6 September 2021	30 June 2022	1 280 000	7,9%
17	5 September 2022	24 July 2023	1 094 000	7,2%
18	4 September 2023	27 June 2024		7,5%
19	2 September 2024	2 July 2025	834 000	6,3%
20	1 September 2025	2 July 2026		

== Awards ==
This program has received numerous awards from the Academia de Televisión of Spain:

Award	Awarded	Year
Best entertainment program.	El intermedio.	2011, 2012 & 2013.
Best program presenter	El Gran Wyoming.	2008, 2011, 2012 & 2013.
Best script.	Lola Zambade, Sergio Sarriá Ruiz, Alberto González, Miguel Hernández, Eduardo García (Eyo), Raúl Navarro, Diego Saucedo, Óscar Benítez, Luis Miguel Pérez, Manuel Gay, Raquel Haro, Irene Varela, Yaiza Nuevo, Olalla Granka, David Navas & Miguel Esteban.	2012 & 2013.

- In April 2015, it is acknowledged with the Premio Pluma, in the category of media, from the Federación Estatal de Lesbianas, Gais, Transexuales y Bisexuales for its labour against homophobic intolerance.

== Content ==
The structure of the program is simple: at the beginning, El Gran Wyoming says the phrase of its opening:

"Ya conocen las noticias. Ahora, les contaremos la verdad".
(You already know the news. Now, we will tell you the truth, in Spanish.)

After it, appears the header of the show. Sandra Sabatés starts with the news of the day. In the case of the collaborators, usually appears Dani Mateo at first, and showing up Andrea Ropero at last (although the order is not always like that. After that, Wyoming says his farewell discourse:

Mañana más, pero no mejor, porque es imposible.

Finally, appear the credits in which usually are shown the manipulated videos and, at last the Copyright.

The show does not only tells which events have happened during the week, but also how they have been treated by the media. Therefore, current news are exposed in the program, providing also insight into other issues that, without having a lot of impact in the media, are intriguing. Every content is related with the media scene. Therefore, in El intermedio, issues as phobias, civil wars, the interrelationship between the different social groups, etc. are treated.

El Gran Wyoming also talks about the zapping and the mistakes that some reporters discover in the media. Since its first program in 2011, its structure changed and starts a section called "La actualidad en 1 minuto" in which the news and events that happen all around the world are described in barely a minute.

Since the season 2013–2014, this section has been substituted by an overview of the main news without a stipulated timing, in which the different collaborators participate alternatively, with the exception of Thais Villas (interviews), who appears at the end.

== Sections ==
=== Current sections ===
- Actualidad musical (musical actuality): Iván Lagarto y Álvaro Carmona parody the actuality and transform it into a musical performance.
- Interviews with Manuel Burque: The humorist goes onto the street and do a report.
- El montacargos: Similar to a Sitcom, in which appear different member of the political class.
- Zanguangos: The humorist Joaquín Reyes parodies well-known characters from the Spanish political class, (such as Pablo Iglesias, Esperanza Aguirre, Jordi Pujol...), with his usual manchego style.
- A lo Ropero: Andrea Ropero visits different political events as a reporter, to ask them uncomfortable questions that no other channel dares to ask. Besides, the collaborator travels to several countries which suffer a humanitarian crisis, showing reports as, for example, immigrants’ situation.
- El pico the la mesa (The peak of the table): Wyoming contemplates the actuality from the peak of the table. Occasionally, Sandra Sabatés also comes to this peak.
- Thais Villas: Interviews with different guests: famous or pedestrians; generally on the street or in a place related to the interview.
- Imbatible Dani Mateo (Invincible Dani Mateo): Dani Mateo's interventions in the set, generally with Wyoming's participation, that also go over the social media.
- Reality Shock: Sara Escudero analyzes with a lot of humor and rigour some global issues that affect society: the job insecurity beneath the clothing industry, the business of the personal information in the social media or why the biggest corporations barely pay any taxes.
- Manipulated videos: Even though it is not a proper section, between the different parts of the show or when changing the subject, they are introduced. Some recurrent videos are:
  - Aznar en tiempos revueltos: The video is based on an interview of Veo7 to José María Aznar in which he talks about the situation in Spain when he got to the Government in 1996. In this video, a famous character substitutes the interviewer, exchanging jokes with Aznar.
  - Canciones de Rajoy (Rajoy's songs): This video is composed by parts of the electoral debate of 2008, singing the lyrics of well-known songs.
  - ¿Has mantenido relaciones sexuales con...?(Did you have sex with...?): A voice-over asks the person shown in the video (usually a politician) if they have had sex with other men, followed by an outstanding answer of the interviewed.
  - Aznar en inglés (Aznar in English): Mockeries about how the ex president talks in English in different situations. After the events of the Madrid's Candidature for the Olympic Summer Games in 2020, where his wife Ana Botella, former Madrid's major, talks in English and makes popular expression "relaxing cup of café con leche", her appearance is also usual.
- (The videos has changed accordingly to actuality, but its gist is still the same).
- La voz de la calle (The street voice): Occasionally, the program undertakes surveys related to the actuality to pedestrians.
- Servicio Público (Public Service): Thais Villas brings a politician to carry out everyday activities that current citizens ask them to, as washing the car.
- Mujer tenía que ser (Woman had to be): Sandra Sabatés interviews a woman who has been or is a reason for exceedance.

=== Former sections ===
- Cañas y barra (Beers & counter): Thais Villas goes to a bar with a famous person to interview them.
- Sabáticos (Sabbatical): Weekly section where two young Spanish, Pedro and Pablo, from the blog Sabaticos.com, tired of the Spanish crisis, travel to three countries (India, Brazil and Japan), with the main purpose of made known the culture and customs, lifestyle and institutions from Spain; such as its gastronomy, football or Institutions as the Civil Guard.
- Las andadas de Usun Yoon (The Adventures of Usun Yoon): Usun Yoon interviews in the street and in crowded events.
- El experimento (The experiment): A reporter goes onto the street to make jokes to the pedestrians and watch their behaviour. The experiments are continually changing, but there are several installments of the same subject. For example, some experiments were Destructoras or Qué será lo que quiere el negro.
- Amigos (Friends): The guests performed a little role in the show.
- ¡Qué viva España!: Thais Villas goes to the street to ask about different issues to the immigrants that live in Spain.
- Seven Apps: Dani Mateo presents the most bizarre apps invented for smartphones and those made up by the program. Initially it was called: Apps de mierda (Shitty apps)
- Animales hijos de p... (Animals sons of a...): In this part, hosted initially by Yolanda Ramos and, later on, by África Luca de Tena. In it, several pieces of documentaries related to dangerous animals are shown.
- Franco: A puppet caricatures the dictator Francisco Franco, usually to make comments related to news or to join the guests.
- Troche y Moche: Two puppets that appear orange ants, parodies of Trancas and Barrancas, the pets of El Hormiguero, acted in a puppet theatre with Franco's puppet.
- Economía para guapos (Economy for beauties): This section had Rafa Martín ( a young fitness star in YouTube) as ambassador, who voiced his mind with Wyoming and Dani Mateo in relation with the actuality according to the imaging world with the purpose that the beauties of Spain understand better the economy of the country.
- Teología para guapos (Theology for beauties): It is a section with a similar format to Economía para guapos, where Rafa Martín voiced his opinion about the theological actuality, showing its intricacies to make it more understandable for Spain's beauties.
- La Hoz (The Stickle): Parodying the talent show known as La voz, Wyoming is the jury of a contest that looked for a new spokesman on the left side of the Spanish politics.
- Reportera Low cost (Low cost reporter): Usun Yoon travelled around cities all over Europe to ask citizens of different countries about issues related to Spain and its actuality. The only requirement was that the trip had to be done by a Low cost company.
- La actualidad en 1 minuto (Actuality in a minute): Wyoming and Beatriz Montañez quickly reviewed the actuality, showing edited images. In reality, it Tok more than just 1 minute.
- Lo que España vota va a misa (What Spain votes is final): Survey in which the audience (which answered via SMS) was asked about a current issue, providing two humorous answers.
- Beni: an Elmo puppet (of the television series Sesame Street) controlled by Wyoming laughed at the news.
- Aborto libre (free abortion): The first pet of the show, the linx Aborto libre, always came to annoy Wyoming and Beatriz or to make something filthy.
- Thais Villas en acción ( Operativo Thais Villas. Also Villas People): Thais Villas went to the street to ask some questions to famous characters, politicians or citizens.
- Todo sobre mi madre (All about my mother): In this section, viewers sent question to Wyoming, and he answered them in the program.
- Tania Llasera: Tania Llasera complaints about the injustices of Spain.
- Sex Home: Tania Llasera went to the street so that people in which parts of their house had they had sex.
- Milagros (Miracles): Tania Llasera's dog showed its abilities.
- Yo te llevo (I'll take you): Thais Villas took different famous in a limousine such as: Estopa, Willy Toledo or Fernando Trueba. The music of the section was Hit the Road of Ray Charles.
- Mi país en la mochila (My country in the bag): Usun Yoon traveled around various villages of Spain, emulating the RTVE program Un país en la mochila of José Antonio Labordeta.
- Trata de arrancarlo, Usun (Try to start it, Usun): It was a section with Usun Yoon as its main character, where she enrolled on a course to pass the drivers' examination, which she finally did.
- Expediente Iker (Iker dossier): Beatriz Montañez satirized the program Cuarto Milenio, of Iker Jiménez, emitted by Cuatro. Previously, this section was hosted by Cristina Peña.
- Un, dos, tres, haga daño otra vez (One, two, three, hurt again): This section, which was a parody from the former contest of TVE Un, dos, tres, in which Thais Villas, along with a guest, and they usually mocked of Wyoming.
- Tengo una pregunta para usted Sr. Wyoming (I have a question for you Mr. Wyoming): Parodying the program of TVE, the spectators asked questions to Wyoming.
- El mundo según Google (The world according to Google): In this section the results of the image search in the browser of the news provided by Beatriz were shown.
- ¿A quién nos ganaremos hoy? (Who will we win today?): El Gran Wyoming and Beatriz Montañez showed the traditions of other countries, so that the Spanish immigrants watched the program, such as Peru, Romania, Bolivia or Morocco.
- El cocinero de Rota (Rota's chef): El Gran Wyoming presented some funny or awkward videos of the chef José Luis Santamaría. Originally, this section was presented by África Luca de Tena and, afterwards, by Tania Llasera.
- El padre sonrisas (Smile father): It is a gathering of videos of Jorge Loring, a priest who, through the television, taught catholic and biblical values in his program Para salvarte, always with aggressive theories or rhetoric.
- Deontología, cuándo serás mía (Deontology, when will you be mine): In this section, the non-compliances of the deontological code were reviewed.
- Butifarras y estrellas (Botifarras and Stars): Section dedicated to the overview of events related to the Catalonian elections.
- Qué morriña de ikurriña: Section dedicated to the elections of Galicia and the Basque Country, which were simultaneous.
- House of Jaris: Section that covered the Andalusian Elections. In its heading, Chiquito de la Calzada substitutes Kevin Spacey in its role of Frank Underwood in the series House of Cards.

== Gags and sketches ==
=== Current ===
- Portugal and France: Usually, El Gran Wyoming makes some references to its neighboring countries in a satyric way, often highlighting the similarity between Spain and France and Portugal and Spain.
- Previous channels: It is usual that Wyoming is humiliated telling his experience related to his expulsion of the rest of the Spanish channels.
- Chess: Occasionally, El Gran Wyoming includes this sport into his jokes, describing it as a dull and monotonous game.

=== Former ===
- Eggs: When Wyoming wanted to avoid saying that word, he level up his hands and, when getting them off, in the lower part of the screen appear two big eggs, making a sound.
- Talking in English: When Beatriz Montañez said something in English while she is in her section, Wyoming tend to fixed something that she had said, pissing her off.
- Usun is from Utrera: It was a usual joke that Usun Yoon appeared dressed with typical Andalusian clothing, assuring her Andalusian origin despite her oriental features and foreign accent.
- President Zapatero: it was a usual joke (after Federico Jiménez Losantos implied that La Sexta was part of the propagandistic machinery of the PSOE) that when someone referred to the now expresidente Zapatero, El Gran Wyoming stood up and adopted a militar position while he places a finger on one of his eyebrows making the popular gesture of the Support Platform of Zapatero.
- Ortega Cano against the world: During the presidential elections of 2008, the program emitted a video in response to the negative of the PP to offer a debate televised by La Sexta and which consisted of a manipulation that mixed fragments of the interview to José Luis Rodríguez Zapatero and Mariano Rajoy with an interview to the bullfighter, José Ortega Cano in DEC, in a way that it appeared a real discussion between them. The video received rave reviews on the Internet and soon the program made more versions with Pedro Solbes and several other politicians, and, once the elections passed, characters such as Andrés Pajares, Sara Montiel, form series such as Quark from Star Trek or Jim Brass from CSI, an English teacher and Bruce Willis, among others.
- Franco was gay: During the season of 2007–2008 it was usual that Cristina Peña, in collaboration with a professional visionary, reviews the experiments carried out by Iker Jiménez in his program Cuarto Milenio, where she tried to surprised them by asking if Franco was gay, although they always answered no, that they did not believe it, despite the evidences that Cristina showed.
- Windows from Cádiz: It consisted of a gargantuan screen that answered with sexual rhythms to any question that it was asked.
- Totana: It was really usual that Wyoming made any reference to this Murcia's locality.
- Loves: (In the program) Juanra was in love with Beatriz, and he is always telling her that he sees them as a family, although Beatriz tells him that they are never going to start it. Thais is also in love with Wyoming, but he could not accept it as she is from the PP, (previously, Wyoming was in love with Thais, but she ignored him, until the season 09/10, when Thais became from the PP, blocking the possibility of being with Wyoming, as he is from the PSOE), but he ended up succumbing to her insinuations and, since then, they are considered partners and they usually show their love for each other in public, although more than once they have had an argument. Little by little, this gag has become more unusual, and currently there is no reference made towards it.
- Conquest of easy jokes: Frequently, El Gran Wyoming presents a section in which all the collaborators made some easy jokes about any news. This gone always ended with a joke told by Beatriz Montañez, at which nobody laughed.
