= The Goodbye Kiss (film) =

- Directed by: Michele Soavi
- Written by: Michele Soavi; Massimo Carlotto
- Starring: Alessio Boni; Michele Placido; Isabella Ferrari; Alina Nedelea; Carlo Cecchi
- Cinematography: Giovanni Mammolotti
- Music by: Andrea Guerra
- Release date: 2006
- Running time: 107 minutes
- Country: Italy
- Language: Italian

The Goodbye Kiss (Italian: Arrivederci amore, ciao, also known as Goodbye My Love, Goodbye) is a 2006 Italian neo-noir thriller film directed by Michele Soavi. It is based on the pulp novel Arrivederci amore, ciao by Massimo Carlotto. The film won the David di Donatello for best original song ("Insieme a te non ci sto più", performed by Caterina Caselli and written by Paolo Conte and others).

== Cast ==
- Alessio Boni as Giorgio Pellegrini
- Michele Placido as Ferruccio Anedda
- Isabella Ferrari as Flora
- Alina Nedelea as Roberta
- Carlo Cecchi as Sante Brianese
- Antonello Fassari as Sergio Cosimato
- Max Mazzotta as Ciccio Formaggio
