= Sorry If I Call You Love =

- Film poster
- Spanish: Perdona si te llamo amor
- Directed by: Joaquín Llamas
- Screenplay by: Fran Araújo; Manuel Burque
- Based on: Scusa ma ti chiamo amore by Federico Moccia
- Produced by: Pedro Pastor; Ghislain Barrios; Álvaro Augustin; Josep Escolà
- Starring: Paloma Bloyd; Daniele Liotti; Jaume Pujol; Jordi Rico; Pablo Chiapella; Adrià Collado; Andrea Duro; Lucía Delgado; Lucía Guerrero; Pep Munné; Jan Cornet; Patricia Vico
- Cinematography: David Omedes
- Edited by: Oriol Carbonell
- Music by: Arnau Bataller
- Production company: Telecinco Cinema
- Distributed by: Emon
- Release date: 20 June 2014
- Running time: 120 minutes
- Country: Spain
- Language: Spanish

Sorry If I Call You Love (Spanish: Perdona si te llamo amor) is a 2014 Spanish romance film directed by Joaquín Llamas based on the 2007 novel by Federico Moccia. It stars Paloma Bloyd and Daniele Liotti.

== Cast ==
- Paloma Bloyd as Niki
- Daniele Liotti as Álex
- Irene Montalà as Elena
- Andrea Duro as Oli
- Patricia Vico as Simona
- Jaume Pujol as Roberto
- Pablo Chiapella as Pedro
- Adrià Collado as Enrique
- Lucía Delgado
- Lucía Guerrero as Erica
- Joel Bosqued as Fer
- Marina Gatell as Cristina
- Jordi Rico as Felipe
- Mariona Ribas as Miriam
- Pep Munné as Leonardo
- Jan Cornet as Marcelo
- Àlex Maruny as Satur
- Cristina Brondo as Susana
- Olalla Moreno as Carmen

== Production ==
Penned by Fran Araújo and Manuel Burque, the screenplay is an adaptation of the novel by Federico Moccia. The film is a Telecinco Cinema production. Shooting locations included Barcelona and Cadaqués.

== Release ==
Distributed by Emon, the film was theatrically released in Spain on 20 June 2014.

== Reception ==
Pere Vall of Fotogramas gave the film a negative review and 2 out of 5 stars, singling out as the only positive points (among laughable scenes galore) Bloyd and her character's female friends, Chiapella, Omedes' cinematography and the Barcelona setting.

Jonathan Holland of The Hollywood Reporter deemed the film to be "a slick, blandly superficial forbidden love fantasy with a carefully calibrated lack of knowingness that lends it a certain appeal".

== See also ==
- List of Spanish films of 2014
