= The Fugitive (2003 film) =

- Directed by: Andrea Manni
- Written by: Massimo Carlotto; Andrea Manni
- Produced by: Massimiliano La Pegna; Pietro Lama
- Starring: Daniele Liotti
- Cinematography: Massimino Pau
- Edited by: Alberto Lardani
- Music by: Teho Teardo
- Release date: 2003
- Running time: 97 minutes
- Country: Italy
- Language: Italian

The Fugitive (Italian: Il fuggiasco) is a 2003 Italian crime drama film written and directed by Andrea Manni. It is based on a 1995 autobiographical novel by Massimo Carlotto, about his period in hiding in France and Mexico following a miscarriage of justice.

For this film Andrea Manni was nominated for David di Donatello for Best New Director.

== Cast ==
- Daniele Liotti as Massimo Carlotto
- Joaquim de Almeida as Lolo
- Claudia Coli as Alessandra
- Alessandro Benvenuti as Lawyer Vignoni
- Francesca De Sapio as Massimo's Mother
- Roberto Citran as Massimo's Father
- Marco Giallini as Beniamino Rossini
- Fiorenza Tessari as Vignoni's Wife
- Gabrielle Lazure as Vicky
- Luisa Ranieri as Maria
