= Beasts of Satan =

Satanic group

Andrea Volpe, Nicola Sapone, Paolo Leoni, Mario Maccione, Pietro Guerrieri, Marco Zampollo, Eros Monterosso
- Other name: Beasts of Satan

Details
- Victims: 1 inducted suicide, 3 confirmed murders but up to 18 suspected
- Span of crimes: 1998–2004
- Country: Italy
- States: Lombardy, province of Varese
- Date apprehended: February 2004

The Beasts of Satan (Italian: Bestie di Satana) were a group of Italian serial killers who were tried and convicted of a series of suspected Satanic ritual murders between 1998 and 2004. The group was active in the Eastern and North-Eastern periphery of the Milan metropolitan area, mostly in the Province of Varese. The persons involved in the group were Andrea "Isidon" Volpe, Nicola "Onussen" Sapone, Paolo "Ozzy" Leoni, Mario "Ferocity" Maccione, Pietro "Wedra" Guerrieri, Marco "Kill" Zampollo, Eros "Kaos" Monterosso, and Elisabetta Ballarin, who wasn't part of the group but was romantically tied to one of the members and was at the scene of one of the murders. The slayings were called "one of the most shocking crimes in post-war Italy" by the BBC.

== Crimes and investigation ==
=== First murders ===
The first incident was a January 1998 double homicide that occurred in the woods near Somma Lombardo, northwest of Milan. Chiara Marino, a shop assistant, aged 19, and Fabio Tollis, a 16-year-old student and heavy metal musician who was in love with her, were sacrificially stabbed and beaten in a drug-fueled occult rite involving sex and heavy metal music. The two had spent a Saturday night drinking beer and listening to heavy metal music at Midnight Pub, which was the centre of the city's metal scene, but never returned home. Both Tollis and Marino were stabbed to death by their friends Andrea Volpe, Nicola Sapone and Mario Maccione. Fabio Tollis, a sturdy young man (6 feet and 1 inches tall, 220 pounds; 185 cm, 99 kg) desperately tried to defend himself and his friend Marino but was overpowered by the larger group. Maccione, Sapone and Volpe later buried the corpses in a large grave in the woods and danced on the graves, laughing and screaming "Now you're both zombies! Try to get out of this hole, if you dare!". The conclusion initially drawn by the authorities at the time was that they had run away together, as their friend suggested, but this explanation was not accepted by Tollis's father, Michele Tollis, who began his own investigation. Just a few hours before the murder, Fabio Tollis called home and asked his father for permission to spend the night at Marino's house. Michele Tollis denied his son this permission but, realizing something was not right, immediately drove to the Midnight to have a word with him. Unfortunately, it was too late: Fabio and Chiara had already left with their friends for Somma Lombardo and never came back. Michele Tollis eventually discovered how deeply they had become involved in Satanism and the occult, both common themes of the black metal and death metal genres that his son and friends were interested in. Becoming convinced of a connection between Satanism and their disappearance, Michele Tollis spent the next six years steadily building a file on their activities and the bands in which they had played. When the third murder occurred, Tollis took his findings to the police, who used them to link all three murders to Andrea Volpe and the wider Satanic sect.

=== Third murder and revelations ===
The third murder was committed in January 2004. Mariangela Pezzotta, 27-year-old shop assistant, former girlfriend of group member Andrea Volpe, was shot in the face, mutilated and later buried while she was still alive in a greenhouse in the nearby town of Golasecca not far from Somma Lombardo. Andrea Volpe was arrested shortly afterwards with his girlfriend, an 18-year-old high school student named Elisabetta Ballarin, the daughter of an upper-class family who had run away from home with Volpe when she was just a teenager. Both Volpe and Ballarin were disoriented because of alcohol and drug consumption. Volpe confessed he had invited Pezzotta for a friendly dinner but had already decided to kill her because she knew too many details about the sect in addition to Tollis and Marino's murder. Volpe shot her after a verbal fight, then called Sapone for help. When they saw that Pezzotta was still alive, Volpe later recalled that Sapone said to him, "You can't even kill a person!" and threatened him. At first they tried to hide the dying girl's body in the greenhouse of Ballarin's parents' home and ended up hitting her several times with a heavy spade before burying her, even though she was still alive. After that, Sapone went home and pretended nothing had happened. Hours later Volpe and Ballarin took a heavy dose of cocaine and heroin and decided to get rid of Pezzotta's car by driving it into a nearby river, but they had a car crash and were arrested. After the Pezzotta murder Volpe was arrested, and a few months later he confessed to the earlier killings of Tollis and Marino and led the police to their bodies . Police investigators at this point uncovered information regarding the wider group. As the investigation continued, Mario Maccione, who had presented himself as "the medium" of the group and had been regarded by Tollis as his best friend, confessed to having beaten Fabio to death with a hammer, after Volpe and Sapone had stabbed him and Chiara Marino.

Additionally, sect members were accused of pushing their friend, Andrea Bontade, to commit suicide. Bontade had had a role in the digging of the grave to bury Tollis and Marino but didn't show up the night of the killing. Volpe and Sapone saw this as a betrayal and planned to kill him by adding LSD to Bontade's beers. The repeated consumption of these drugs put Bontade in a confused and disconnected state of mind, which led him to having difficulties performing ordinary tasks in his everyday life, his parents and friends recalled.

In September 1998, after a night of heavy drinking at the Midnight Pub with his friends, Andrea Bontade was about to drive home, when, as he was leaving the pub, Sapone handed him 10.000 lire (a little over 5 euros) for some gas for the car and told him: "Either you do it, or we do it!". Bontade drove straight to a roundabout at 180 kph (about 112 mph) and crashed against the wall of a house. On the ground, investigators later found no traces of braking and concluded that Bontade had died instantly. Authorities also investigated whether the group had any links to a possible wider network of Satanists in Italy.

== Murders ==
=== Confirmed ===
- Fabio Tollis, 16 years old at the time, killed by stabbing and hammering on 17 January 1998. A young heavy metal enthusiast and musician, former member of the Beasts themselves. He was in love with Chiara Marino and had also tried to leave the Beasts. The group tried to kill him and Marino on 31 December 1997 by locking them in a car and throwing a firecracker into the tank, which made the car burst into flame, but Tollis and Marino escaped. They were told by the group that that was one of the "tests of courage" which the group frequently administered. The two were eventually murdered on 17 January 1998. Their bodies were buried in the woods near Somma Lombardo.
- Chiara Marino, 19 years old at the time, killed on the same occasion as Tollis.
- Andrea Bontade, 19 years old at the time, killed by induced suicide on 21 September 1998. Bontade was also a member of the Beasts and was supposed to be with the group on the night of the Tollis and Marino killings, but was not present at the time. He had helped dig the hole where the bodies were buried. The group psychologically tortured him and convinced him to commit suicide by crashing his car into a wall.
- Mariangela Pezzotta, 27 years old at the time, ex-girlfriend of "Isidon" Volpe, killed on 24 January 2004. Volpe was "ordered" to kill Pezzotta by "Onussen" Sapone when Sapone begun suspecting that she was about to turn the group in for the 1998 Tollis-Marino murders. She was shot twice in the face by Volpe and hit with a shovel in a chalet, owned by Volpe's family, near Golasecca, and buried in the chalet's garden. Volpe and Elisabetta Ballarin (Volpe's girlfriend at the time and also at the chalet) stated that it was Sapone who hit Pezzotta with the shovel; the latter denied it and stated that, when he arrived at the chalet following a phone call by the other two, Pezzotta was already dead. The autopsy revealed that Pezzotta was still breathing when she was buried.

=== Other alleged murders ===
Involvement of the "Beasts of Satan" has been suspected for up to fourteen other unsolved cases in the same area and time frame, including alleged suicides, disappearances and violent deaths of people allegedly tied to members of the group. Among these:

- 31-year-old Fabio Rapalli, whose body was found mummified in a wood near Pontremoli on 6 September 1996.
- 23-year-old construction worker Christian Frigerio, from Brugherio, allegedly a former member of the group, who disappeared on 14 November 1996. His body has never been found. Mario Maccione connected his disappearance to the group in 2008, but later retracted his statement.
- 21-year-old Andrea Ballarin, a childhood friend of Volpe, found hanged in the school he had been attending on 7 May 1999. His suicide was connected to the Beasts by Volpe and later by Maccione too, but the police found Volpe's confession and description of the events unreliable.
- 28-year-old Angelo Lombardo, caretaker of the cemetery of Legnano and an acquaintance of some members of the group, burned alive in the cemetery on 14 December 1999.
- 26-year-old Doriano Molla, found hanged in the woods near Cavaria con Premezzo on 27 December 2000.
- 21-year-old Luca Colombo, a flower vendor and friend of Sapone, found hanged in Legnano on 5 May 2004.
- 18-year-old carpenter Alberto Scaramuzzino, from Dairago, found burned in his car in the woods near Arconate on 23 May 2004.

The involvement of the group's members in these cases, however, has never been proven. Mario Maccione accused other group members (Sapone, Volpe, Leoni, Zampollo and Monterosso) of being responsible of some of these crimes, but these accusations have been denied by them and have never been proven.

== Trials ==
On 22 February 2005, Andrea Volpe and Pietro Guerrieri were sentenced in the northern city of Busto Arsizio to 30 and 16 years' imprisonment respectively. Volpe, in addition to the 1998 murders, was also found guilty of the 2004 slaying of Pezzotta. In Volpe's case, the sentence was a decade longer than requested by prosecutors. A third suspect, Mario Maccione, had also confessed to the murders but was cleared due to his secondary role in the crimes.

The reactions of the victims' families to the sentencing were mixed. Michele Tollis, the father of Fabio, said "Today justice rewarded me." Lina Marino, mother of the slain Chiara, was outraged at the relatively light sentences Volpe and Guerrieri had received, due to their cooperation with prosecutors. She stated "They are murderers. It's not fair."

Five more members of the group went to trial in June 2005 and were sentenced to long prison terms in early 2006. Nicola Sapone, leader of the group and the suspected mastermind behind the killings, received a life sentence. The other four - Paolo Leoni, Marco Zampollo, Eros Monterosso and Elisabetta Ballarin - were sentenced to between 24 and 26 years for their roles in all three murders. In 2007 the Court of Appeal confirmed the life sentence for Sapone and lengthened the convictions of three other members of the group: Paolo Leoni's 26 years became a life sentence, Marco Zampollo went from 26 years to 29 years and 2 months, and Eros Monterosso's sentence was increased from 24 years to 27 years and 3 months (the same increase as Zampollo). Elisabetta Ballarin's sentence was reduced from 24 years and 3 months to 23 years. In May 2008 the final court, Court of Cassazione, confirmed all the Appeal's decisions.

Andrea Volpe was released from prison in 2020 and he is currently studying Science of Education.

Elisabetta Ballarin, who was involved in the murder of Mariangela Pezzotta in 2004 and jailed for being an accessory to murder in 2006, is now free and trying to turn her life around. She worked for a time in a restaurant in northern Italy, and is currently living abroad.

== Reaction ==
The crimes occurred against a background of growing concern in Italy that Satanism and the occult were becoming increasingly attractive to Italian youth. In February 2005, a Roman Catholic university connected to the Vatican began offering a two-month course on diabolical possession and exorcism for priests and seminarians. In reaction to the crimes, priest Don Aldo Buonaito called for death metal to be banned, saying "If music makes itself an instrument of nefarious deeds and death, it should be stopped". In light of revelations from the Beasts of Satan investigation and trial, as well as growing public concern, Italian police stated their intention to create a special unit focusing on new religious sects, particularly Satanists and other violent ritualistic groups. It would coordinate nationwide investigations into potentially dangerous new religious movements, and planned to include psychologists and a priest who is an expert on the occult.

During the annual National Carabinieri Day celebrated in Varese on 8 June 2005, the first instance public prosecutors Antonio Pizzi e Tiziano Masini, as well as the police officials Enzo Molinari, Quaranta Attilio, Giuseppe Notaro and Paolo Marcolli, were awarded by the head of the Italia Arma dei Carabinieri's body for the investigations on the Beast of Satan's murderers.

== In mass culture ==
MOVIES

- In Nomine Satan, 2012, by Emanuele Cerman

PODCASTS

- Indagini: Lombardia, 1998-2004, 2022, a two-part podcast edited by Stefano Nazzi

THEATRE

- Poco più di un fatto personale (A little more than a personal fact), 2022, by Marco Di Stefano and Chiara Boscaro, directed by Stefano Beghi and produced by La Confraternita del Chianti / Karakorum Teatro

== See also ==
- List of serial killers by country
