= Carlo Gnocchi =

Italian priest, educator and writer

Blessed Carlo Gnocchi
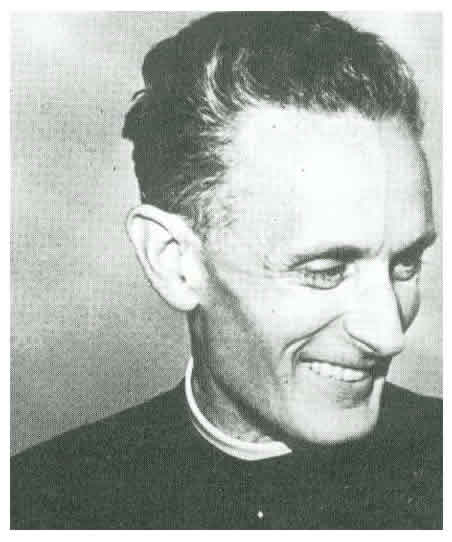
- Gnocchi, c. 1950
- Born: 25 October 1902; San Colombano al Lambro, Lombardy, Kingdom of Italy
- Died: 28 February 1956 (aged 53); Milan, Lombardy, Italy
- Venerated in: Catholic Church
- Beatified: 25 October 2009 by Cardinal Archbishop Emeritus of Milan Dionigi Tettamanzi
- Feast: 25 October

Carlo Gnocchi (Italian pronunciation: [ˈkarlo ɲˈɲɔkki]; 25 October 1902 – 28 February 1956) was an Italian priest, educator and writer. He is venerated as a blessed by the Catholic Church.

During World War II, he was a military chaplain of the Alpini, the elite mountain warfare soldiers of the Italian Army, and after the tragic experience of the war, he strove to ease the wounds of suffering and misery created by the war.

== Early years ==
"Two of my sons you have already taken, Lord. The third I offer to You, so that You bless him and keep him always at Your service."

— Clementina Pasta, mother of Father Gnocchi

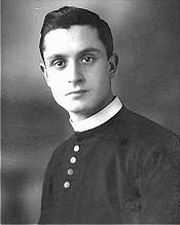
Picture of young don Gnocchi

Gnocchi was born in San Colombano al Lambro, a few miles from Lodi, to Enrico Gnocchi and Clementina Pasta, a seamstress. The youngest of three brothers, when he was age five, he lost his father in 1907, from silicosis, caused by the unhealthy job as a marble worker.

After moving to Milan with family, he lost his two older brothers in a few years – Mario, in 1908, and Andrea, in 1915, from tuberculosis. He grew up in a very devout and fervent environment, in the village of Montesiro in Brianza, where he often went to his relatives because of poor health. There, he was approached by the priest Luigi Ghezzi, who helped him in his choice to enter seminary. He received his Holy Orders as priest in 1925 from Archbishop of Milan Eugenio Tosi, and the same year he celebrated his first Mass in Montesiro.

== Educator ==
"How nice it is to play in the snow when it is clean and white. Jesus also likes to play with the souls of the children when they are white and clean, but if they get spoiled, Jesus doesn't like them any more..."

— Carlo Gnocchi

Gnocchi's first passion, since the first years of his priesthood, was the upbringing and education of the youth, by getting them closer to the Catholic Church and the oratory.

First, he was entrusted to the parish of Cernusco sul Naviglio and then in 1926, the densely populated San Pietro in Sala of Milan, he continued his vocation for years, creating a deep bond with his parishioners.

His fame as an educator came to Cardinal Archbishop of Milan, Alfredo Ildefonso Schuster who, in 1936, appointed him as spiritual director of the Gonzaga Institute of the Brothers of Christian Schools.

== The war ==
"I can say to have finally seen the man in those fatal days. The naked man, completely stripped, because of the violence of the events so much bigger than him, from any restraint and convention, in complete mercy of the most basic instincts emerged from the depths of being."

— Carlo Gnocchi, "Cristo con gli Alpini"

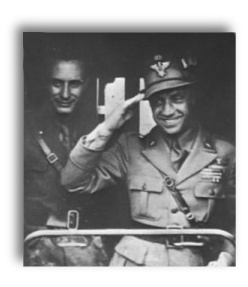
Father Gnocchi in departure for the Russian front, in the company of general Luigi Reverberi

At the end of the 1930s, Gnocchi was named chaplain of the second legion of Milan, composed of students of the Università Cattolica del Sacro Cuore and the Gonzaga Institute. His mother, to whom he was very attached, died in 1939. At the start of World War II, Gnocchi volunteered in the Val Tagliamento battalion of the Alpini, sent to the Greek–Albanian front. After the Balkans Campaign in 1941, in 1942 Gnocchi left for the Russian front as chaplain of the 2nd Alpine Division Tridentina, where he participated in the Battle of Nikolayevka. During the dire retreat in the Russian steppe, he nearly fell victim to the freezing cold: dazed by frostbite, he would certainly have met the fate of thousands of other Italian servicemen, had not medical officer Rolando Prada (an offspring of the famous leather-working family) recognized him and put him on a passing military sled.

Surviving the conflict, he gathered last wishes of the wounded, that he would bring back to Italy, in a journey all over the country, as a messenger for the families of the deceased. He went into the Alpine Valleys to find the relatives of fallen comrades. After becoming part of the O.S.C.A.R., Catholic association for aid to refugees, he helped Jews and escaped Allied POWs flee to Switzerland. He wrote articles in the illegal magazine Il Ribelle (Rebel) and in the diocesan newspaper L'Italia (Italy). He was imprisoned more than once in the San Vittore prison, but obtained the liberation by the intervention of the archbishop of Milan, Alfredo Ildefonso Schuster. In those years the idea arose to create a charitable center that would take care of the victims of this war, which in the future developed as the origin of the Pro Juventute.

== Postwar period ==
After the war, Gnocchi felt as his duty to aid that part of childhood that had been affected by the war the most. First, he directed his charitable work to the orphans of Alpini, housing them in Istituto Arosio (Institute Arosio) and subsequently devoted himself to the "mutilated" and to children invalids of war and civilians, establishing for them a vast network of colleges in many cities of Italy (Inverigo, Parma, Pessano con Bornago, Turin, Rome, Salerno, Milan, Florence, Genoa, ...); and, in the end, opened the doors of modern Centri di rieducazione ("Re-educations centers") for children affected by polio. For this forsaken and handicapped children, to whom he had devoted all of his young life, Gnocchi dedicated one of his most significant writings: Pedagogia del dolore innocente (Pedagogy of Innocent Suffering).

== Juvenile Foundation ==
"A dream, after the war, to be able to devote myself to a work of charity, whatever it is, or better the one that God would want from me."

— father Carlo Gnocchi

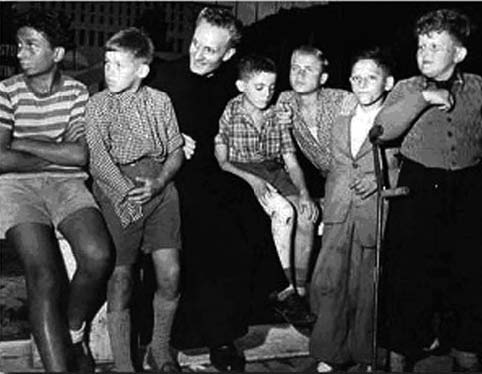
Father Gnocchi in the company of mutilated children

The dramatic experience of the retreat from Russia, lived as military ordinariate always on the front, matured in Gnocchi the idea and the focus of his charitable mission; assisting the victims of war, in search of redemption for their "innocent suffering". In 1945, he was nominated as director of the Istituto Grandi Invalidi (Institute of Registered Invalids) of Arosio, thus accepting the first orphans and adults disabled by the war. In 1948, he founded the "Fondazione Pro Infanzia Mutilata" ("Foundation For Mutilated Infants"), acknowledged in the next year with a decree by the President of Italy. The same year, the Italian Prime Minister Alcide De Gasperi nominated Gnocchi as adviser to the Presidency of the Council for the mutilated by the war. In 1951, the foundation was dissolved, and all its goods and structure were donated to the newly created Fondazione Pro Juventute (Juvenile Foundation).

== Death ==
"Thank you for everything..."

— Last words of Carlo Gnocchi

"...Others will serve them better that I knew and could do; no one else, perhaps, to love them more than I did."

— From Testament of Father Carlo Gnocchi

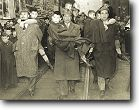
Procession of the Alpines and "mutilated" at the funeral of Father Gnocchi

He died in Milan, age 53, with a crucifix in his hands, given to him by his mother years before, and very beloved in his last hours. The metastasis of the tumor that had stricken him had reached the skeleton and the respiratory system. Three crises that occurred between noon and the evening before had announced the fourth, fatal, and no one had delusions about his possible recovery anymore: Don Gnocchi's constitution had been too hardly tested and accompanied by suffering and fasting, as well as by the unrelenting advancing of the illness, even though his face, often smiling, deceived visitors. While dying, he donated his corneas to two blind children, guests of his foundations, Silvio Coangrande and Amabile Battistello.

== Long road to beatification ==
"Before, I used to tell you: goodbye, Father Carlo. Now I tell you: goodbye, Saint Carlo."

— A mutilated child, during the funeral held in the Milan Cathedral

After his death, there were many people and the believers who called for his help, say they received graces by the priest. On 17 August 1979, an Alpino, a specialist electrician by profession, from Villa d'Adda, survived a serious accident at work. The miracle is attributed to Gnocchi, invoked by the victim. For these reasons, thirty years after his death, cardinal archbishop of Milan Carlo Maria Martini established the Processo sulla vita, virtù e fama di santità (Process on the life, virtues and reputation for holiness) (Diocesan process) on 6 May 1987, that was concluded positively on 23 February 1991. In 199 sessions was held deposition of 178 texts and numerous documentation that was collected. This investigation material (for a total of 4321 pages) was presented to the Congregazione per le Cause dei Santi di Roma (Congregation for the Causes of Saints in Rome), where Brother Leo Luigi Morelli was appointed postulator of the cause of canonization.

After his death, which occurred in 2002, replaces brother Rodolfo Cosimo Meoli. After years of careful investigation and analysis, on 20 December 2002, Pope John Paul II declared him venerable. On 17 January 2009, Pope Benedict XVI, with a papal decree recognized a miracle attributed to Gnocchi, a decisive step towards the beatification. On 2 March 2009, cardinal Dionigi Tettamanzi announced the beatification for the 25 October 2009; the rite for beatification was presided by the archbishop of Milan, cardinal Dionigi Tettamanzi in the presence of many ambrosian priests and bishops. Among these were the cardinal Prefect of the Congregation of Bishops Giovanni Battista Re, the former Master of Pontifical Liturgical Celebrations Msgr. Piero Marini and the Prefect of the Congregation for the Causes of Saints, bishop Angelo Amato.

== Awards ==
"The debt to him will never be repaid."

— Giulio Andreotti

His charitable work goes under the name of Juvenile Foundation Don Gnocchi, today known as Don Carlo Gnocchi - ONLUS Foundation, that was awarded in 2003 with gold medal of merit of Public Health.

Benemeriti of public health

== Works ==
"A face, a sight that comes from far away: a love for young people, a passion for education, the momentum of a long and never ending journey through the roads of war, lost in the silence of the Russian land, the tender and passionate affection for his mutilated children."

— Carlo Maria Martini, preface to the writings of Father Carlo Gnocchi

His writings include:

- Educazione del cuore : Dall'infanzia al matrimonio, (1939) Soc. Ed. Internazionale, Turin
- Restaurazione della persona umana, (1946) La Scuola, Brescia
- Gli scritti (1934–1956), (1993) Ancora, Milan
- Cristo con gli alpini, (1999) Ancora, Milan
- Il dolore innocente, (1999) Mondadori, Milan
- Dio è tutto qui. Lettere di una vita, (2005) Mondadori, Milan
- Poesia della vita, (2006) San Paolo, Cinisello Balsamo

== Bibliography ==
- Don Carlo Gnocchi. L'apostolo dei mutilatini, Ines Belski Lagazzi, Modena, Edizioni Paoline, 1968
- Don Gnocchi, papà dei mutilatini, Teresio Boschi, Turin, Library of Christian Doctrine, 1969
- Don Gnocchi, Vittoria Marina, Padua, Edizioni Messaggero, 1979
- Don Carlo Gnocchi, un uomo del suo tempo, Elena Semenza e Aldo Colombo, Pavia, Logos International, 1987
- Don Gnocchi. Ritorno alle sorgenti, Aldo Del Monte, Casale Monferrato, Piemme, 1996
- Diario 1941. Don Carlo Gnocchi in guerra con il cuore in pace, Ferruccio De Marchi, Milan, Ancòra, 2000
- Ho conosciuto don Gnocchi. I testimoni raccontano, Roberto Parmeggiani, Milan, Ancòra, 2000
- Con cuore di padre. La spiritualità di don Carlo Gnocchi, Ezio Bolis, Milan, Ancòra, 2001
- Don Carlo Gnocchi. Vita e opere di un grande imprenditore della carità, Giorgio Rumi e Edoardo Bressan, Milan, Mondadori, 2002
- La mia baracca. Storia della fondazione Don Gnocchi, Giorgio Cosmacin, Bari, Laterza, 2004
- L'ardimento. Racconto della vita di don Gnocchi, Stefano Zurlo, Milan, Rizzoli editore, 2006
- Li amò sino alla fine, Ennio Apeciti, (Biografia ufficiale della Diocesi di Milano), Centro Ambrosiano, 2009
- Don Gnocchi. Fu sempre con loro, Ennio Apeciti, Centro Ambrosiano, 2009
- Don Gnocchi. Il prete che cercò Dio tra gli uomini, AA.VV., A cura di Emanuele Brambilla, Centro Ambrosiano, 2009
- Don Carlo Gnocchi, alpino cappellano, Gaetano Agnini prefazione Dionigi Tettamanzi, Mursia, 2011 ISBN 978-88-425-4660-3
- Stefano Zurlo; Carlo Maria Martini (preface) (2006). L'ardimento : racconto della vita di don Carlo Gnocchi. Libri dello spirito cristiano (in Italian). Milan: Biblioteca Universale Rizzoli. p. 200. ISBN 9788817009515. OCLC 64672533.

== Biographical film ==
- Don Gnocchi – L'angelo dei bimbi (2004; television film), directed by Cinzia Th. Torrini
- Father of Mercy

== See also ==
- List of blesseds
- List of Italian writers
- List of Milanese people
