= Father of Mercy =

- Screenplay by: Simone De Rita; Roberta Colombo
- Directed by: Cinzia Th. Torrini
- Starring: Daniele Liotti; Roberto Citran; Mattia Sbragia; Ugo Pagliai; Philippe Leroy; Pietro Taricone
- Composer: Guido & Maurizio De Angelis
- Country of origin: Italy
- Original language: Italian

Production
- Cinematography: Alessandro Pesci
- Editor: Anna Rosa Napoli
- Running time: 230 min.

Original release
- Network: Canale 5
- Release: 2004

Father of Mercy (Italian: Don Gnocchi - L'angelo dei bimbi) is a 2004 Italian television movie directed by Cinzia Th. Torrini. The film is based on real life events of Roman Catholic priest and then Blessed Carlo Gnocchi.

== Plot ==
The film describes the life of Father Carlo Gnocchi, and Italian priest who dedicated himself to minister to wounded and dying soldiers during World War Two, and the war's victims in Italy. Gnocchi volunteered to be the military Chaplain on the battle front, following which, he started a foundation to aid the children victims of the war.

== Cast ==
- Daniele Liotti as Don Gnocchi
- Giulio Pampiglioni as Matteo
- Francesco Martino as Francesco
- Alexandra Mutu as Sara
- Pietro Taricone as Giuseppe Esposito aka Margherita
- Matteo Ripaldi as Pierandrea
- Luisa Maneri as Rebecca
- Mattia Sbragia as Baldacci
- Ugo Pagliai as Cardinal Schuster
- Lucio Zagaria as Sartorelli
- Luciano Roffi as General Lancia
- Philippe Leroy as Pope Pius XII
- Roberto Citran
