= El Gran Wyoming =

Spanish actor and musician

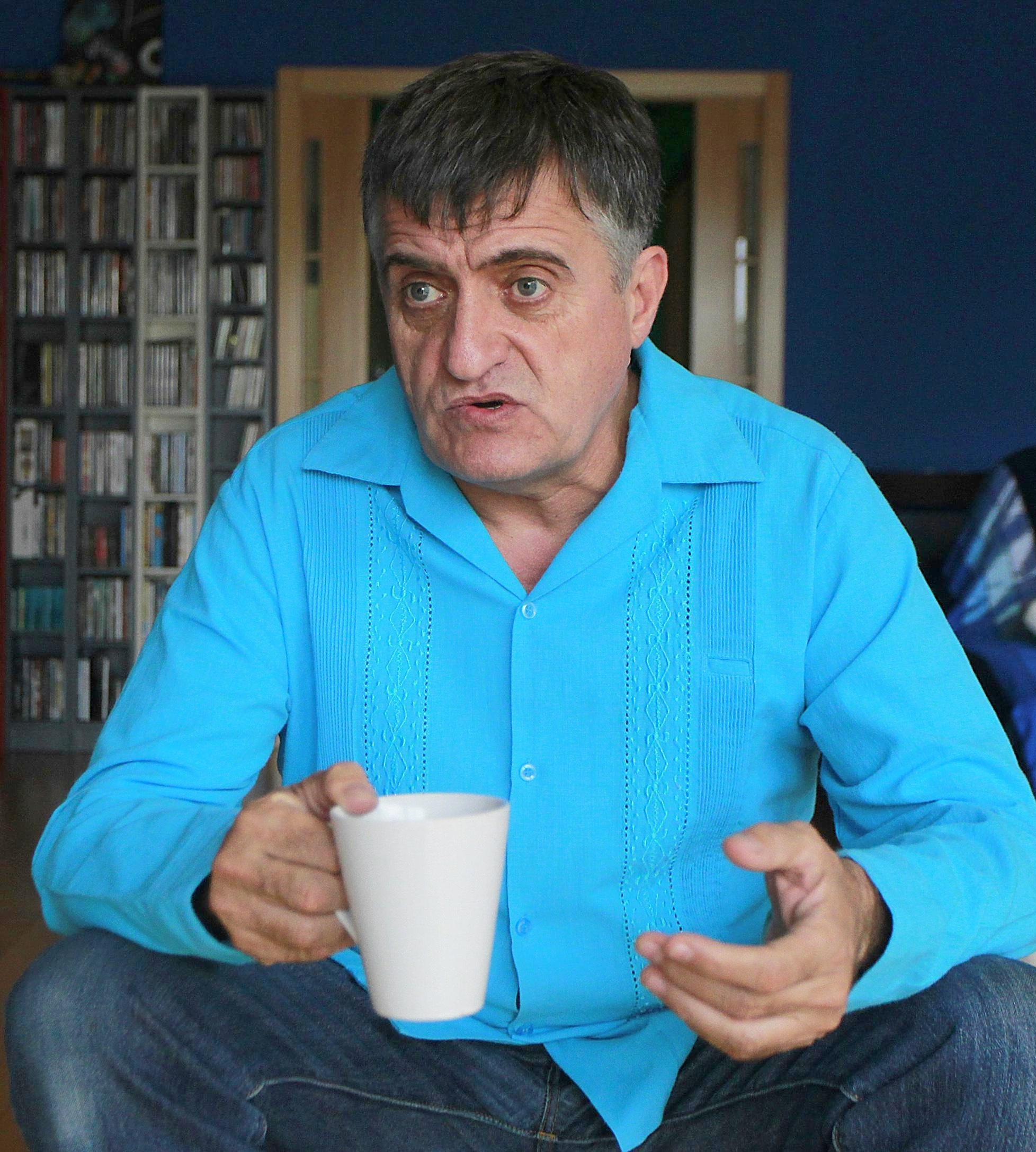
- Born: José Miguel Monzón Navarro; 15 May 1955 (age 71); Madrid, Spain
- Notable work: Host of El Intermedio & Caiga quien caiga

Comedy career
- Medium: Television
- Genre: Political satire

José Miguel Monzón Navarro (15 May 1955, Madrid), better known by his stage name El Gran Wyoming (The Great Wyoming), Wyoming or Guayo, is a Spanish comedian, musician, writer and TV presenter. He has hosted the LaSexta satire show El Intermedio since 2006.

In 2016, Wyoming's program El Intermedio was ordered to pay €35,380 in compensation to a woman for displaying a topless picture of her on their website for several months without her consent.

== Books ==
- 1990, Un vago, dos vagos, tres vagos. Ed. Temas de Hoy. ISBN 84-7880-885-X
- 1993, Te quiero personalmente. Editorial Anagrama. ISBN 978-84-339-1494-1
- 1997, Las aventuras del mapache. Ed. Alfaguara. ISBN 84-204-5700-0
- 2000, Janos, el niño que soñaba despierto. Ed. Agruparte. Colección de Cuentos Musicales "La mota de polvo" ISBN 978-84-95423-10-8
- 2013, No estamos locos. Planeta. ISBN 9788408118657
- 2014, No estamos solos. Planeta. ISBN 9788408131557
- 2016, ¡De rodillas, Monzón!. Planeta. ISBN 9788408154921
