= List of Sasakawa Health Prize recipients =

This is a list of recipients of the Sasakawa Health Prize awarded by World Health Organization (WHO).

On the idea and with financial support from Mr Ryōichi Sasakawa (1899–1995), Chairman of the Japan Shipbuilding Industry Foundation and President of the Sasakawa Memorial Health Foundation, the award was founded in 1984. The Sasakawa Health Prize consists of a statuette and money of the order of $30,000 USD to be given to a person(s) and/or of the order of $40,000 USD to be given to an institution(s), who have accomplished outstanding innovative work in health development, such as the promotion of specific health programmes or significant advancements in primary health care, to encourage the further development of health.

== List of recipients ==
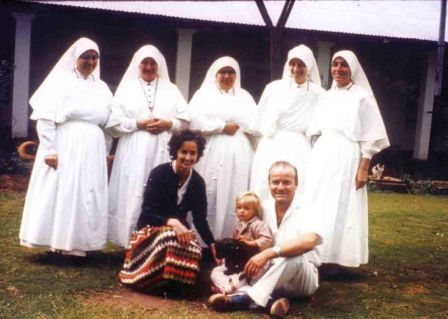
1986 laureates, Piero and Lucille Teasdale with their daughter Dominique and the Combonian Sisters

| Year | Name | Country |
|---|---|---|
| 1985 | Jesus C. Azurin | Philippines |
| 1985 | David Bersh Escobar | Colombia |
| 1985 | SEWA-RURAL | India |
| 1986 | Ayadaw Township People's Health Plan Committee | Burma |
| 1986 | Lucille Teasdale Corti; Piero Corti | Uganda |
| 1986 | Amorn Nondasuta | Thailand |
| 1987 | Marie Joan Winch | Australia |
| 1988 | Christian Aurenche | France; Cameroon |
| 1988 | Indonesian Family Welfare Movement | Indonesia |
| 1989 | Niu Dongping | China |
| 1990 | Monsignor Fiorenzo Angelini | Holy See |
| 1990 | Badri Nath Tandon | India |
| 1990 | Biankouri Health Centre | Togo |
| 1991 | Hector Martinez Gomez; Edgar Rey Sanabria | Colombia |
| 1991 | The Regional Centre for Development and Health/Primary Health Care | Benin |
| 1991 | The Vulowai Health Committee | Fiji |
| 1992 | Handojo Tjandrakusuma | Indonesia |
| 1992 | Brigitte Girault; Badara Samb | Senegal |
| 1992 | Canadian Public Health Association | Canada |
| 1993 | Oladapo Alabi Ladipo; Grace Ebun Delano | Nigeria |
| 1993 | Arpana Research and Charities Trust | India |
| 1994 | Mo-Im Kim | South Korea |
| 1995 | Javier Torres-Goitia | Bolivia |
| 1995 | Le Kinh Due | Vietnam |
| 1996 | A. Gherardi | Chad |
| 1996 | Society for Health Education | Maldives |
| 1997 | The Mongar Health Services Development Project | Bhutan |
| 1998 | Roselyn Mokgantsho Mazibuko | South Africa |
| 1998 | Ahmed Abdul Qadr Al Ghassani | Oman |
| 1998 | Gondar College of Medical Sciences | Ethiopia |
| 1999 | J. G. Ortiz Guier | Costa Rica |
| 1999 | Institute of Urban Primary Health Care | South Africa |
| 2000 | Yoav Horn | Israel |
| 2000 | Oviemo Otu Ovadje | Nigeria |
| 2000 | Family Planning Association (PLAFAM) | Venezuela |
| 2001 | João Aprigio Guerra de Almeida | Brazil |
| 2002 | Programa Nacional de Atención Odontológica Integral para Mujeres Travbajadoras de Escasos Recursos | Chile |
| 2003 | Department of Health Center for Health Development - Eastern Visayas | Philippines |
| 2003 | Yemen Leprosy Elimination Society | Yemen |
| 2004 | The Family Planning Association of Sri Lanka | Sri Lanka |
| 2005 | Centre for Training and Education in Ecology and Health for Peasants | Mexico |
| 2006 | International Leprosy Union | India |
| 2006 | Agape Rural Health Program | Philippines |
| 2007 | Jose Antonio Socrates | Philippines |
| 2008 | Movement for Reintegration of People Affected by Hansen's Disease | Brazil |
| 2009 | Amal Abdurrahman Al Jowder | Bahrain |
| 2010 | Xueping Du | China |
| 2011 | Eva Siracká | Slovakia |
| 2011 | Albergue Maria Association | Panama |
| 2012 | Syamsi Dhuha Foundation | Indonesia |
| 2013 | No-Yai Park | South Korea |
| 2014 | Leprosy Control Foundation | Dominican Republic |
| 2015 | Childbirth with Dignity Foundation | Poland |
| 2016 | Federation of Medicus Mundi | Spain |
| 2017 | Arslan Rinchin | Mongolia |
| 2018 | Pro Palliative Care Unit Foundation | Costa Rica |
| 2019 | Judith Ndongo Embola Torimiro | Cameroon |
| 2019 | Eusebio Quispe Rodríguez | Peru |
| 2020 | Geospatial System of Integrated Health Networks (Geo-RIS) | Peru |
| 2021 | Wu Hao | China |
| 2021 | Amal Saif Al-Maani | Oman |
| 2022 | Paisan Ruamviboonsuk | Thailand |
| 2023 | The Nick Simons Institute | Nepal |
| 2023 | Vichai Tienthavorn | Thailand |
| 2024 | Doreen Ramogola-Masire | Botswana |
| 2025 | Merete Nordentoft | Denmark |
| 2026 | Banconi Community Health Association (ASACOBA) | Mali |
