= Gulu University School of Medicine =

Coordinates: 02°46′58″N 32°18′28″E

- Type: Public
- Established: 2004
- Affiliations: Gulu University
- Location: Gulu, Uganda
- Campus: Urban

Gulu University School of Medicine (GUSM), also known as Gulu University Medical School (GUMS) is the school of medicine of Gulu University, one of Uganda's public universities. The medical school was founded in 2004, two years after Gulu University was established. The school provides medical education at diploma, undergraduate and postgraduate levels.

== Location ==
The school's campus lies within the boundaries of the town of Gulu, the largest urban center in Northern Uganda, approximately 345 kilometres (214 mi), by road, north of Kampala, Uganda's capital and largest city. The medical school lies about halfway between the main campus of Gulu University and Gulu Regional Referral Hospital. This location houses the administrative block as well as the pre-clinical lecture rooms and laboratories. The coordinates of the school's main campus are:2°46'58.0"N, 32°18'28.0"E (Latitude:2.782778; Longitude:32.307778).

== Overview ==
Gulu University School of Medicine is synonymous with the Faculty of Medicine at Gulu University. Clinical teaching takes place at Gulu Regional Referral Hospital, the largest government hospital in Northern Uganda and at St. Mary's Hospital Lacor, a state-of-the-art private hospital affiliated with the Roman Catholic Archdiocese of Gulu. Founded in 2004, the school graduated the first class of physicians in January 2010.

== Undergraduate courses ==
The main undergraduate course offered at the school is the five-year Bachelor of Medicine and Bachelor of Surgery (MBChB). Coursework involves two years of pre-clinical instruction and examination, followed by three years of clinical instruction and examinations. The clinical years involve instruction, teaching and examination in the major four disciplines of Surgery, Internal Medicine, Obstetrics and Gynecology and Pediatrics. This period also involves assignments to regional health units for hands-on instruction in community health. The MBChB degree is awarded after attaining passing grades in written examinations, clinical examinations and oral quizzes known as vivas. An External Examiner (a reputable clinician from an outside institution) is usually part of the examining team in each discipline. In February 2012, the school introduced pharmacy studies, starting with a certificate course. Later that same year, the diploma and degree courses were also introduced.

== Graduate courses ==
As of December 2013, the following graduate courses are offered at the school:

- Master of Medicine in Surgery (MMed/Surgery).
- Master of Medicine in Psychiatry (MMed/Psychiatry)
- Master of Science in Pharmacology (MSc/Pharmacology)
- Doctor of Philosophy (PhD) - Limited availability in selected disciplines

== See also ==
- Uganda Education
- Gulu University
- Uganda Universities
- Uganda Medical Schools
- Uganda Hospitals
