= Richard Reznick =

Canadian surgeon, medical educator, and academic leader (born 1952)

Richard Keith Reznick
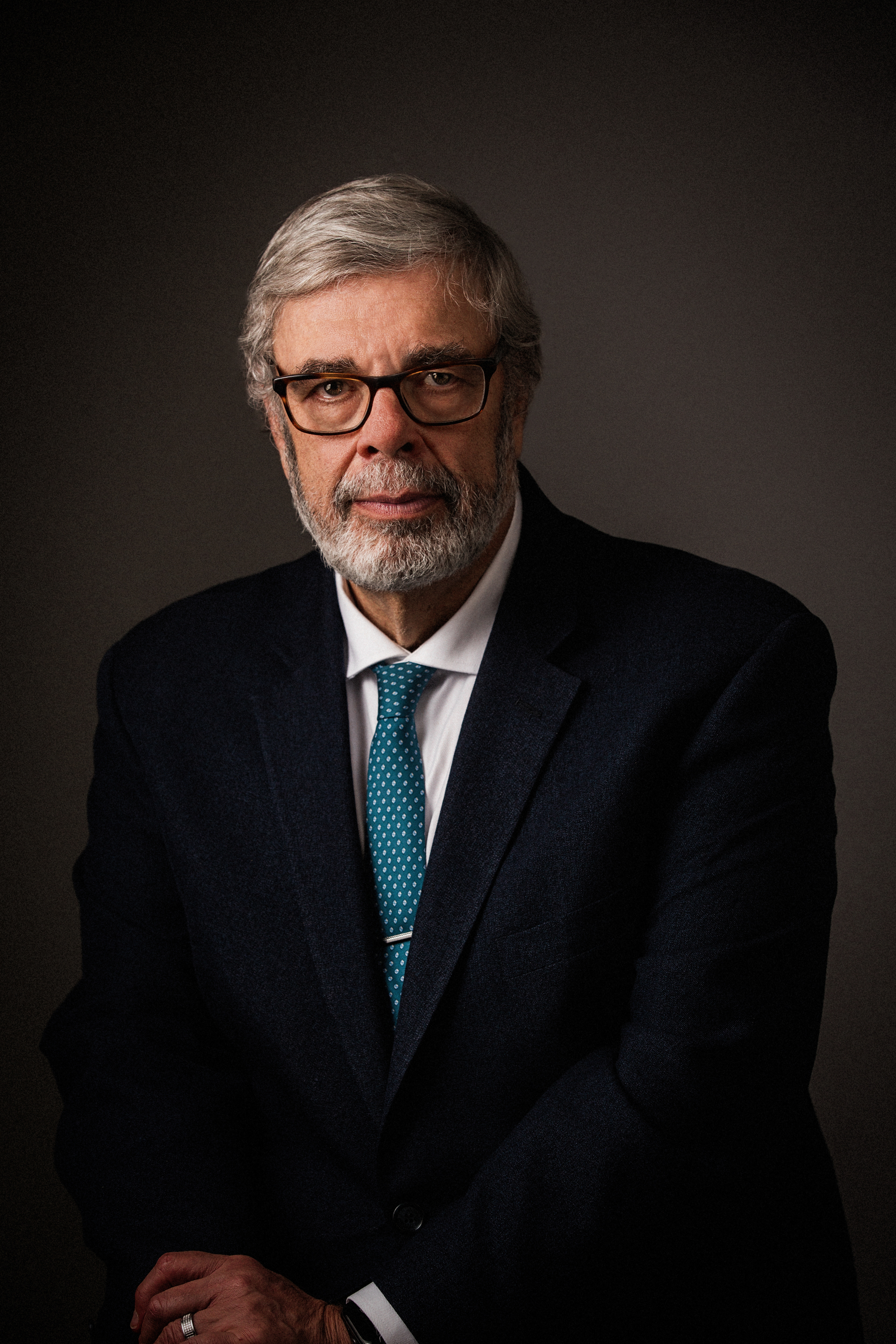
- Dr. Richard Reznick
- Born: 1952 (age 73–74); Montreal, Quebec, Canada
- Education: McGill University (MDCM), Southern Illinois University (MEd), University of Toronto (Residency), University of Texas (Fellowship)
- Occupations: Surgeon, medical educator, academic leader
- Known for: Founding director of the Wilson Centre; Dean of Queen's University Faculty of Medicine; President of the Royal College of Physicians and Surgeons of Canada
- Awards: Officer of the Order of Canada; Karolinska Institutet Prize for Research in Medical Education; honorary fellowships in Royal Colleges; others

Richard Keith Reznick, OC (born 1952) is a Canadian surgeon, medical educator, and academic leader. He was the founding Director of the Wilson Centre at University Health Network, served as Dean of the Faculty of Health Sciences at Queen's University (2010–2020), and as the 46th President of the Royal College of Physicians and Surgeons of Canada (2021–2023). He is noted for contributions to competency-based medical education, national clinical skills examinations, and innovations in surgical education.

== Early life and education ==
Reznick was born in Montreal, Quebec, in 1952. He earned his undergraduate degree and medical degree (MDCM) from McGill University. He then completed a general surgical residency at the University of Toronto. After residency, he pursued a master's degree in Medical Education from Southern Illinois University, followed by a fellowship in colorectal surgery at the University of Texas in Houston.

== Academic and leadership career ==
=== Early career and Wilson Centre ===
Reznick's first faculty appointment was in 1987 at the University of Toronto, in the Department of Surgery. He was the inaugural Director of the Centre for Research in Education at University Health Network (later known as the Wilson Centre), from 1997 to 2002. In 1999, he was appointed vice president, Education at University Health Network.

=== Chair of Surgery, University of Toronto ===
From 2002 until 2010, Reznick held the post of R. S. McLaughlin Professor and Chair of the Department of Surgery at the University of Toronto.

=== Dean of Queen's University Faculty of Health Sciences ===
On 1 July 2010, Reznick became Dean of the Faculty of Health Sciences at Queen's University and CEO of the Southeastern Ontario Academic Medical Organization (SEAMO). He was reappointed for a second term, serving until 2020. During his deanship, Reznick led major curricular and structural reforms including the implementation of competency-based medical education across all residency programs at Queen's.

=== President of the Royal College ===
Reznick was appointed the 46th President of the Royal College of Physicians and Surgeons of Canada in February 2021. His presidency focused on continuing the rollout of the “Competence by Design” framework, promoting equity, diversity, and inclusion, and engaging both trainees and fellows in postgraduate medical education.

== Contributions to medical education ==
Reznick helped develop national standardized clinical skills examinations (OSCE) in Canada used in medical licensure. He also ran a research program on assessment of technical competence for surgeons including surgical simulation and technical skills evaluation. He has been a strong proponent of competency-based medical education. He was co-recipient of the 2010 Karolinska Institutet Prize for Research in Medical Education together with David M. Irby for work on assessing surgical competence and improving surgical safety.

== Honors and recognition ==
- Officer of the Order of Canada (2023) “for his contributions to medical education over his 30-year career”
- Karolinska Institutet Prize for Research in Medical Education, 2010
- Numerous awards for surgical education, including the Royal College of Physicians and Surgeons of Canada Medal in Surgery; James H. Graham Award of Merit; Association for Surgical Education Distinguished Educator Award; National Board of Medical Examiners John P. Hubbard Award; Daniel C. Tosteson Award for Leadership in Medical Education; inaugural University of Toronto President's Teaching Award; honorary fellowships from the Royal Colleges of Edinburgh, Ireland and England.

== Personal life ==
Reznick is married to Cheryl. They have three children.

== External roles ==
Reznick served as vice-president, Science, Healthcare and Research at the Azrieli Foundation. He is also a Director of the Canadian Medical Hall of Fame.

== See also ==
- Royal College of Physicians and Surgeons of Canada
