= The Red Horse =

Novel by Eugenio Corti

The Red Horse (Italian: Il cavallo rosso, 1983) is an epic novel written by Eugenio Corti that follows an industrial family, the Rivas, in Nomana starting from the end of May 1940 through World War II and the new democratic Italy.

The book is divided in three parts:

- The Red Horse,
- The Pale Horse, and
- The Tree of Life.

The book is a metaphor for the genesis of the new democratic Italy that arose out of the ashes of the chaos of pre-fascist, fascist and war-torn Italy. The new Italy is governed by division and loss of conservative Christian values and the question is posed by Michele Tintori if the chaos is a result of this loss. It was translated into English and published by Ignatius Press in 2002.

== Main characters ==
- Manno Riva, an officer in the new Italian army that fight along the Allied armies in occupied Italy;
- Ambrogio Riva, officer of the Italian army, son of an industrialist;
- Michele Tintori, officer of the Italian army, writer and Christian Democratic activist;

== Commentary ==
The novel begins in late Spring 1940 in the town of Nomana (a literary depiction of Corti's hometown Besana in Brianza) where the inhabitants live on agriculture, farming, or work in the textile mill owned by the local industrialist Gerardo Riva, Ambrogio's father. In the afternoon of 10 June, the workers gather in the town square to hear Mussolini's declaration of war over the loudspeakers. However, they receive the news with no enthusiasm: fascism has very few supporters in Nomana, where most people sympathized for the Italian People's Party of which Gerardo used to lead the local branch. Moreover, all the inhabitants are staunch Catholics, and their everyday life is shaped by devotion. As war progresses, young men are sent off to several fronts: North Africa, Russia, Albania. Michele Tintori is captured by Soviet troops and interned in several Gulags, but survives. After the breakup of 8 September 1943 Manno enlists in the Italian Co-Belligerent Army, and others join the partisans, but see a gap digging between themselves and some fellow combatants as the resort to revenge becomes more widespread in the Italian Resistance, in contrast with their Christian beliefs.

Michele Tintori's experiences in Russia have convinced him that totalitarianism is hell on Earth; especially communism is an even greater threat to the Christian order than fascism had been. He thinks the only path out of the inhumanity of the war and post-war chaos is the Christian-Democratic order, which pillars are the Roman Catholic Church and the industrialist elite. The communist, socialist and liberal forces do not see the threat of their progressive ideas because they are ignorant about the evils of un-Christian powers. The danger of a communist-socialist takeover, which would include Italy into the other side of the Iron Curtain, is avoided by the Democrazia Cristiana led by Alcide De Gasperi winning the elections of 18 April 1948. However, in the eyes of Michele Tintori, that same party betrays its founding Christian values by seeking an appeasement with their counterpart, and allowing members of the Communist and Socialist party into key places in education, mass media and culture, thus opening the door to the leftist cultural hegemony and speeding the secularization of Italy. When, in 1974, the referendum for the abrogation of divorce fails, Tintori understands he has been left alone in his battle for Christian values and that Christians are now a minority in Italian society.

The Red Horse is an epic story about the genesis of new Italy, with many affinities to Alessandro Manzoni's novel The Betrothed. Similarly to Manzoni, Corti mixes fictional individual stories with actual history, going as far as inserting real characters in the plot: for example Father Carlo Gnocchi, Nilde Iotti, Agostino Gemelli, Corti's brother Piero (partly recognizable in Pino Riva). Manno Riva is based on Sottotenente Giuseppe Cederle (a recipient of the Gold Medal of Military Valor) whereas details from the author's own life are incorporated in both Michele Tintori and Ambrogio Riva. Corti writes his novel with a world view, which he borrows from Saint Augustine's book De Civitate Dei: man can build the city of God if he decides to rely on divine principles as a foundation for society. When, instead, man leaves God out of the picture he ends up building the city of the Devil.
