= Besana railway station =

Railway station in Italy

Besana
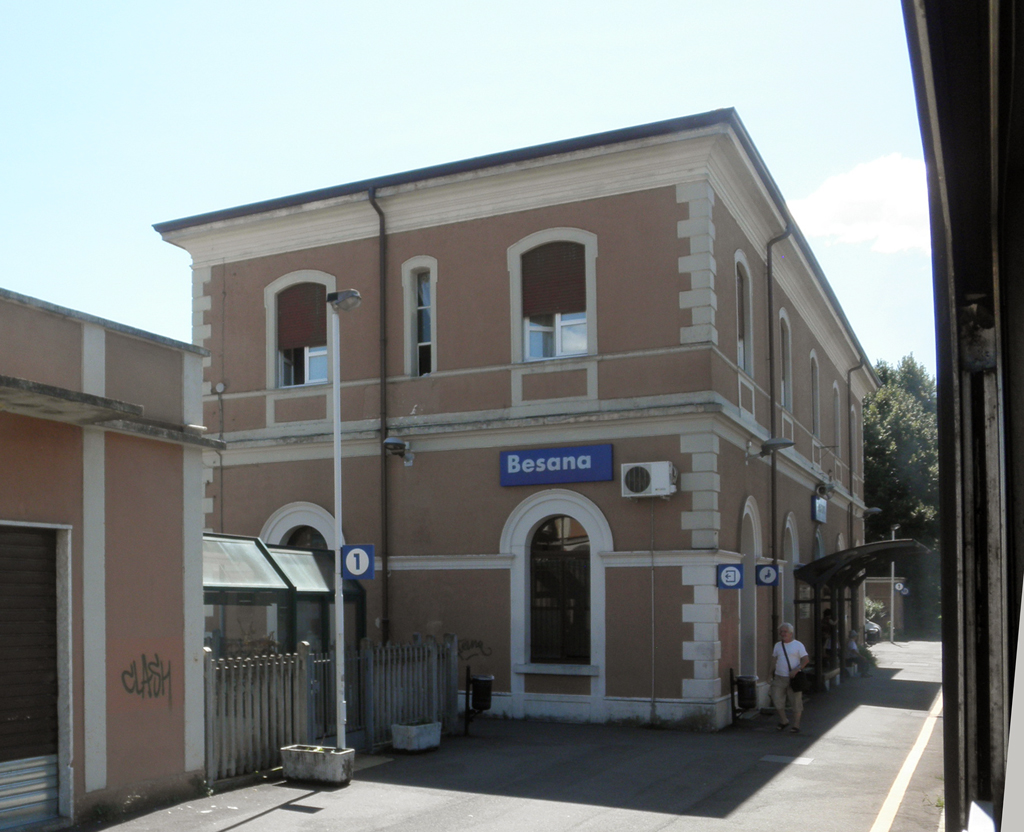

General information
- Location: Besana Brianza, Monza, Lombardy; Italy
- Coordinates: 45°42′10″N 09°16′59″E
- Operator: Rete Ferroviaria Italiana
- Line: Monza–Molteno
- Distance: 18.571 km (11.539 mi) from Monza
- Platforms: 1
- Tracks: 1
- Train operators: Trenord

Other information
- Fare zone: STIBM: Mi7
- Classification: Bronze

Services
Preceding station	Trenord	Following station
Villa Raverio towards Milano Porta Garibaldi	Line S7 (Milan suburban railway service)	Renate–Veduggio towards Lecco
Location
- Location within Lombardy Location within Northern Italy Location within Italy

Besana railway station is a railway station in Italy. Located on the Monza–Molteno railway, it serves the municipality of Besana Brianza in Lombardy as its main station. The train services are operated by Trenord.

== Train services ==
The station is served by the following service:

- Milan Metropolitan services (S7) Milan - Molteno - Lecco

== See also ==
- Milan suburban railway network
- Villa Raverio railway station
