= Red Horse =

Red Horse may refer to:

- Red Horse (collaboration), an album and folk group formed by Eliza Gilkyson, John Gorka, and Lucy Kaplansky
- The Red Horse, a novel by Eugenio Corti
- Red Horse Beer, a beer brewed in the Philippines
- Rapid Engineer Deployable Heavy Operational Repair Squadron Engineers, US Air Force engineers
- one of the Four Horsemen of the Apocalypse
- Vale of the Red Horse, a rural area in South Warwickshire, England
- Shorthead Redhorse, a freshwater fish
- Red Horse (Lakota chief) (1822-1907), participant in the Battle of the Little Bighorn
