= Piero Corti =

Italian doctor

Piero Corti (16 September 1925 – 20 April 2003) was an Italian doctor who chose to work in a hospital in Uganda for most of his life.

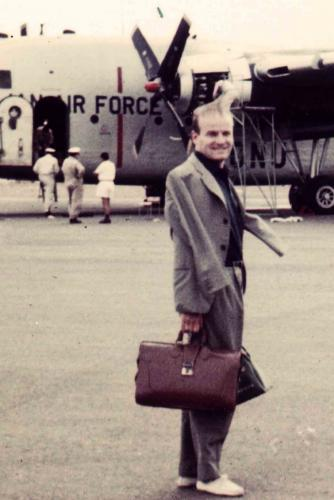
Piero Corti leaving for Lacor,1961

== Childhood between war and illnesses ==
Piero Corti, whose real name was Pietro, was born in Besana in Brianza on 16 September 1925. His father was Mario Corti, and his brothers included Eugenio Corti, who would go on to be a famous writer and essayist, four years older than him. Piero grew up in a relatively wealthy family, because it had invested in the silk trade at first and then it had moved into the building market.

At the age of 7 he developed a severe case of pneumonia, so he was sent by his parents in a college in Stresa, on Lago (Lake) Maggiore, with his brothers to recover. He came back to Besana during the Second World War. After Milan was bombed, his father sent Piero and his brother Giovanni to check their apartment there, and even in that circumstance the teenager showed a clinical gaze at death.

== Young doctor ==
His deep Christian belief and his unselfish soul developed in him the desire to be a doctor, and in particular a doctor in foreign lands. Despite his friends' skepticism, Corti enrolled in the school of Medicine and Surgery at the University of Milan, from where he graduated. In Milan, he met a young girl, Benedetta Bianchi Porro, who was studying medicine, intending to live in Africa as a missionary. Corti, who was in love with her sister Manuela, a famous dancer, despite the age gap, was very close to that girl and when he discovered that she was ill, he promised he would become a doctor in Africa for her and he would work for two. After graduating, he followed the advice of a friend, Agatha Sidlauskas, a psychologist whom he met in Italy through her collaboration with Father Agostino Gemelli, and he moved to Canada, where he specialized in radiology, neuropsychiatry and pediatrics at Hôpital Sainte Justine pour les enfants in Montreal. There, during his studies, he met another Canadian colleague who was specializing in surgery, Lucille Teasdale, who had wanted to be a doctor to fight injustice since she was a child and she seemed perfect to Corti for his future projects.

== When dreams come true ==
After some intimacy, Piero and Lucille did not meet for a period in which Piero was searching for a place where he could realize his dream. When they met again in Marseille, Piero told Lucille about his seven months in India and Africa, where he had rejoined brother Corrado, a missionary in Chad, and he managed to convince her to go with him to Uganda for some months.

On 1 May 1961 Piero and Lucille landed in Entebbe, capital of the British protectorate of Uganda, where brother Toni Biasin, a Combonian missionary, was waiting for them to bring them to Kampala, the city where the surgeon Denis Burkitt operated. He sent them to Gulu, where Combonian fathers had built some dispensaries. They settled in Lacor, a small village 11 m from Gulu, on the land of the Acholi tribe.

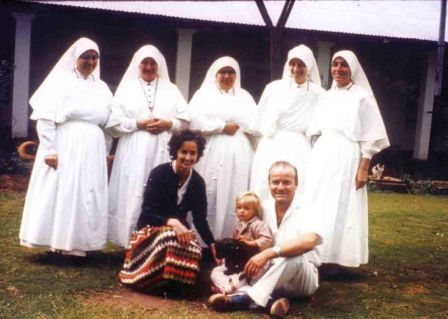
Piero, Lucille and their daughter Dominique with combonian sisters

The dispensary, run by Combonian sisters who worked there as nurses and midwives, was originally composed of just one pavilion, which had a surgery and at least 40 maternity beds. There Lucille began to work as a surgeon and Corti was the anesthetist, the radiologist and the manager. They fell in love and were married in the hospital chapel on 5 December 1961; on 17 November 1962 Lucille gave birth to their daughter Dominique. As well as the ordinary work and the sanitary business, there was the effort to find funding for the hospital. Corti started an epistolary correspondence with many people, doing several journeys to Europe; he was often in Italy to raise money for medical equipment. The best therapy, at the least price for the greatest number of people, was his motto. In that period very important doctors passed by St. Mary's Hospital, such as Dr Arshad Warley, South African pediatrician and professor at Makerere University.

== The civil war ==
In October 1962, almost a year after their arrival in Uganda, the former British protectorate gained independence; there were years of political clashes with the rise of the Prime Minister Milton Obote, who broke the constitution, banished President Mutesa and proclaimed himself new president, then accused of smuggling with captain of Uganda Army Amin Dada, who became General in 1966. When he knew that Obote wanted to arrest him, organized an uprising and assumed power in 1971. There were many clashes between Amin Dada's troops and Obote's supporters and he sheltered in the near Tanzania.

The hospital, which was in the middle of the war outbreak, has been raided several times. In this climate of terror, Piero and Lucille decided to send away their daughter, to ensure her a better education, so Dominique moved to Italy.

Despite difficulties, doctor Corti's work progressed well; at the end of the 1960s the little hospital was enlarged and modernized, new divisions were set up with two theaters, after the authorization of President Amin Dada, who visited the hospital in 1976, new doctors came from Entebbe and even from Italy, a nursery school was opened. Thanks to Italian help, Corti could realize another project: health prevention to avoid kwashiorkor, and he was helped especially by Claude Desjardins and his wife Suzanne.

== The show must go on ==
In 1975, Dominique asked her parents to return to Africa and they decided she would study in a college in Nairobi.

Meanwhile, Corti was becoming more and more esteemed among the Acholi tribe, in fact during an ambush to the hospital, when a soldier threatened to kill Dr Corti, a woman from the tribe saved him.

Keen on hunting and mountaineering since he was a child, with his friends Enrico Citterio and Paolo Della Porta, met at university, Corti decided a climbing of Cervino mountain, that was held in August 1981, despite the initial skepticism of Lucille. Just one year before another promising doctor came to Lacor, Wilson Carswell, Scottish professor at Makerere University, who contributed to make the hospital a qualified center for training young doctors from Uganda. Meanwhile, the first important awards come: Piero and Lucille were promoted "Ufficiali dell'Ordine al Merito della Repubblica Italiana" in 1981.

In 1982, Corti had a mild heart attack and during his convalescence he met a young black doctor Matthew Lukwiya, who had graduated from Makerere University and was a specialist in the diagnosis and treatment of childhood cancers. He was also an expert on AIDS, a disease that was spreading rapidly in Uganda and in other parts of Africa. Matthew became Corti's best colleague, working hard and very close to him and Lucille, who knew, despite his lack of experience, he had a background knowledge better than theirs.

In 1983 the two were invited to Vatican City by Pope John Paul II, who congratulated them on their work in Africa; and while struggles in Kampala were getting more and more cruel and made victims every minute, Piero and Lucille were invited to Ginevra to collect the Sasakawa prize from OMS, won because of their appeal to volunteers and midwives in the fight against malnutrition and their organization of "vaccination safaris" in Northern Uganda.

Conditions were exacerbated by a devastating epidemic of enterocolitis. Many people, terrified, went to shamans who, with their rites, worsened the patients, forced to go urgently to the hospital, which, despite difficulties to find equipments, continued to be expanded with new labs, a physiotherapy department and a library.

After the clashes, only the pediatric division was full of patients, replaced by refugees who had nowhere else to go.

On 7 April 1987 Piero gathered Acholi elders to decide on the future of the hospital and they suggested a temporary closure, which was realized after Matthew's kidnapping by Upda troops. At Lacor were accepted just the most severe cases and Lucille was busy with the most various operations.

After a six-week closure, the hospital was finally reopened under the directorship of Matthew, while Dominique and her parents went to Japan for a conference.

== New climbs, new illnesses, new awards ==
Once again Corti wanted to climb, so after many tests to prove his health, he left for the Ruwenzori in 1991, while Lucille was worsening because of AIDS, which she had contracted after an operation. On 19 September 1993 Corti had a second heart attack, which convinced him to rest, spending a couple of weeks with Lucille in a clinic in the Alps.

In 1995, the Accademia Nazionale dei Lincei awarded Lacor Hospital the Feltrinelli Prize for an "exceptional and high humanitarian value enterprise". On 1 May 1995 President Yoweri Museveni inaugurated the pavilion that would host the outpatient service.

== Last tragic events ==
In 1996 a tragic event marked Corti's life: on 1 August, while he was being awarded membership of the Royal College of Physicians and Surgeons of Canada, Lucille died after many years of illness and suffering.

Corti, left alone, hoped for Matthew's help, but unfortunately, his best doctor in Lacor Hospital and intimate friend died because of pulmonary haemorrhage due to Ebola virus on 5 December 2000.

Corti kept his struggle for St. Mary's Hospital, which today counts over 300,000 patients each year and has been chosen to represent the battle against AIDS in Africa, since it was the first hospital to identify and confirm the first AIDS case to the Uganda Ministry of Health.

In 1993 a new tuberculosis department was inaugurated and today hosts many seropositive patients.

In March 2002 Piero married Argia, a friend of his childhood with whom he shared his last years. After many operations to the coronary arteries, Piero died on 2 April 2003 in Milan from pancreatic cancer. He was aged 77 and had spent 42 years of his life as a missionary in Africa.

== Bibliography ==
- Michel Arseneault (in Italian), Un sogno per la vita: Lucille e Piero Corti, una coppia di medici in prima linea. Turin: Paoline Editoriale Libri, 2004.
- Fondazione Piero e Lucille Corti (in Italian), Dal sogno alla realtà: lettere dal Lacor Hospital Uganda, Bergamo: Corponove Editrice, Settembre 2009.
