= St. Mary's Hospital Lacor =

Private community hospital in Uganda

- Roman Catholic Archdiocese of Gulu
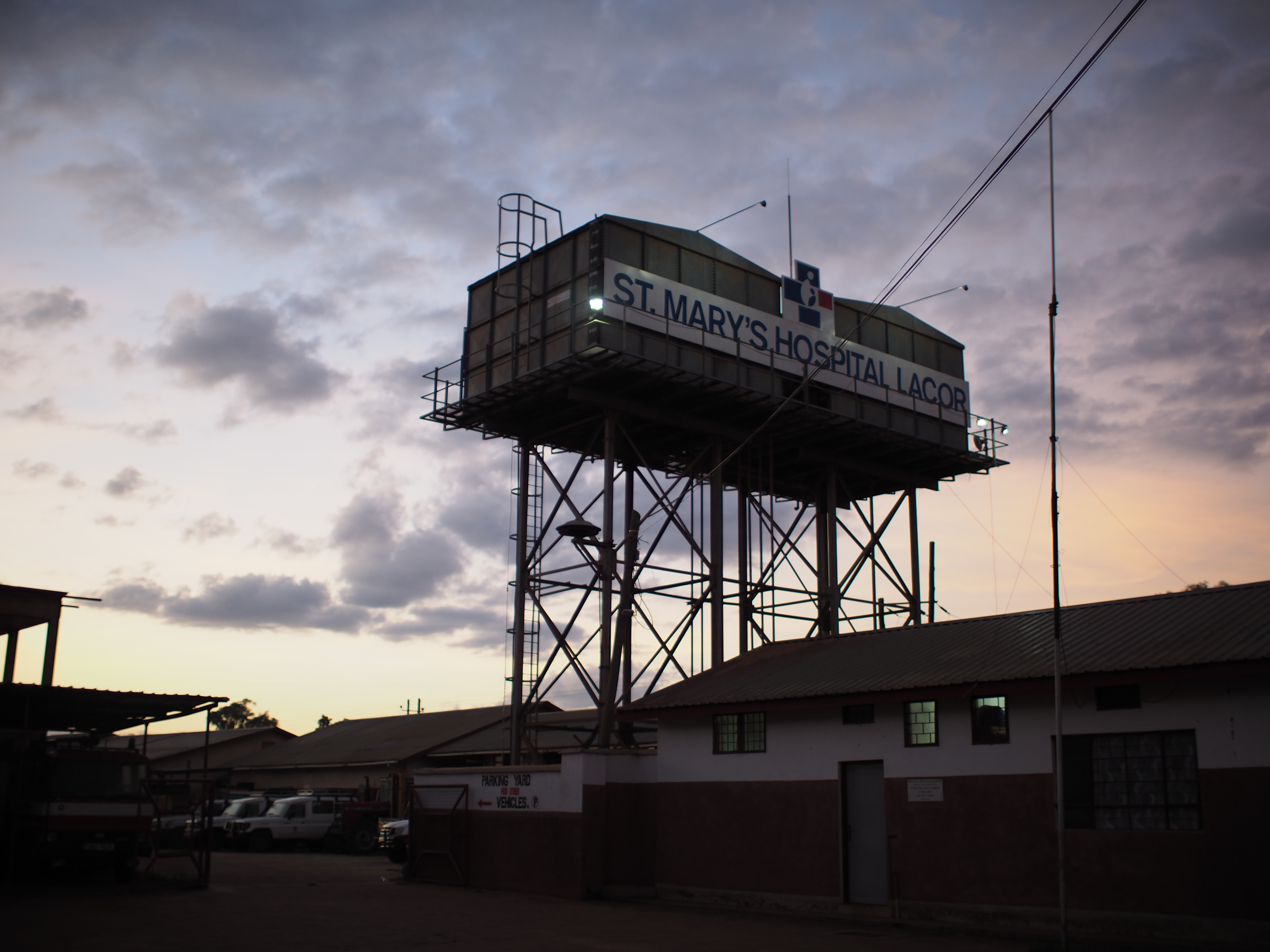

Geography
- Location: Gulu, Gulu District, Northern Region, Uganda
- Coordinates: 02°46′03″N 32°15′11″E

Organisation
- Care system: Private
- Type: General, Teaching
- Affiliated university: Gulu University School of Medicine

Services
- Emergency department: I
- Beds: 483

History
- Founded: 1959

Links
- Website: www.lacorhospital.org
- Other links: Hospitals in Uganda; Medical education in Uganda

St. Mary's Hospital Lacor, commonly referred to as Lacor Hospital, is a hospital in Gulu District, Northern Uganda. It was founded by Comboni Missionaries and is administered and managed by Roman Catholic Archdiocese of Gulu.

== Location ==
Lacor Hospital is located in Obiya West Village, Bardege Division, Gulu City, Gulu District, Acholi sub-region, Northern Uganda. This location lies along the Gulu-Nimule Road, approximately 6 kilometres (4 mi), by road, west of Gulu Regional Referral Hospital. Gulu, the largest city in Northern Uganda, is located approximately 335 kilometres (208 mi) north of Kampala, the capital of Uganda and the largest city in that country. The coordinates of Lacor Hospital are:2° 46' 3.00"N, 32° 15' 11.00"E (Latitude:2.767500; Longitude:32.253056).

== Overview ==
The hospital serves as a general hospital for a significant percentage of the population of the city of Gulu and of Gulu District. It also serves as a referral hospital for many smaller hospitals in the region, as well as less well equipped and staffed hospitals in the country. Lacor Hospital is one of two teaching hospitals for Gulu University School of Medicine, the other being Gulu Regional Referral Hospital. St. Mary's Hospital Lacor is one of the best in East Africa.

== History ==
Founded in 1959 as a 30-bed hospital, by July 2005 it had 483 beds. It also includes a nursing school and other health worker training programs. The hospital maintains remote Level III Health Centers in Amuru, Opit and Pabbo with an additional 24 beds. Each day, the hospital hosts an average of 600 inpatients and their attendants, as well as 500 outpatients, for a daily total of about 2,000 individuals. During the Lord's Resistance Army insurgency, between 2,000 and 10,000 women and children would crowd into the hospital compound every night to avoid the nighttime attacks and abductions by the Lord's Resistance Army.

During the violent and tyrannical reign of Idi Amin in the 1970s, the hospital was often caught in the crossfire. Throughout the 1980s, the hospital remained at constant risk as thugs repeatedly ransacked the compound, looking for drugs or petrol. Raiders kidnapped staff members and held them for ransom.

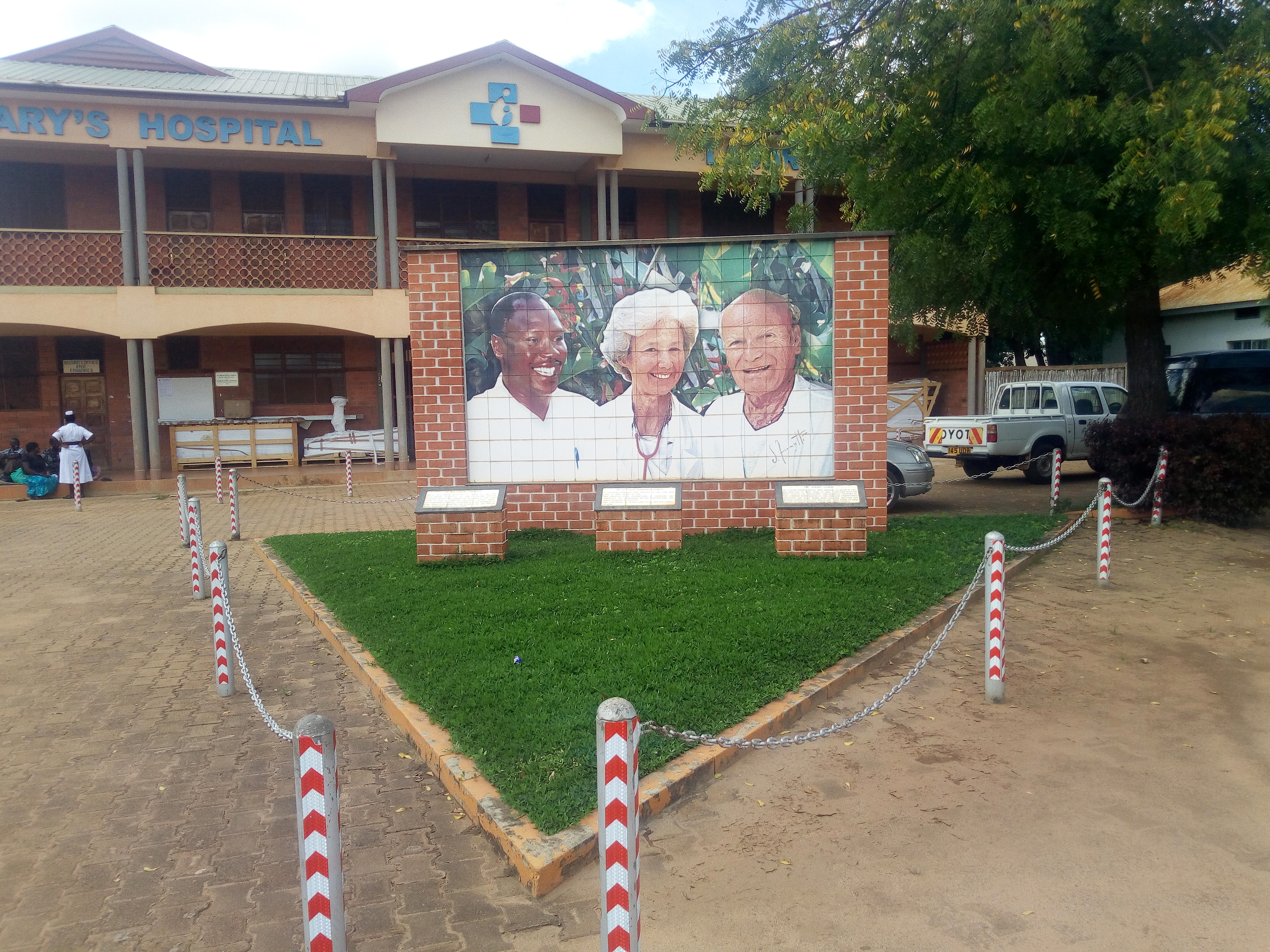
St Mary's Hospital Lacor Doctors

The first surgeons at the hospital were Lucille Teasdale-Corti and Piero Corti, who arrived in 1961. Teasdale-Corti later died, in 1996, of the AIDS she had contracted from a patient while performing surgery. Other notable employees include Matthew Lukwiya, who was instrumental in containing a 2000 outbreak of Ebola, before succumbing to the disease himself.
