= Lucille Teasdale-Corti =

Canadian physician and surgeon (1929–1996)

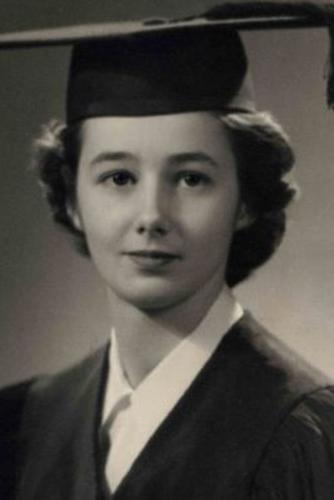
- Teasdale in the 1950s
- Born: January 30, 1929; Montreal, Quebec, Canada
- Died: August 1, 1996 (aged 67); Besana in Brianza, Italy
- Occupations: Medical doctor and pediatric surgeon
- Known for: Pediatric surgeon at Lacor Hospital, Uganda
- Spouse: Piero Corti (m. 1961)

Lucille Teasdale-Corti CM GOQ (January 30, 1929 – August 1, 1996) was a Canadian physician and pediatric surgeon, who worked in Uganda from 1961 until her death in 1996. With her husband she co-founded a university hospital in the north of Uganda.

== Early life and education ==
Born in Montreal, Quebec, on 30 January 1929, Lucille Teasdale was the fourth of seven children. Her father was a generous butcher in Montreal’s working-class, East End.

In 1941, she entered the Catholic high school belonging to one of the first congregations of nuns established in Canada and dedicated to education. Upon hearing testimony from some nuns who had worked as missionaries in Nanjing, China, she decided, at 12 years of age, to become a doctor "in the Indies."

She won a scholarship to enter the University of Montreal’s Faculty of Medicine in 1950. In her class of 110 students only ten women were enrolled. Eight of these female students continued their studies past the first year. She graduated cum laude in 1955 and carried out her internship in Montreal’s Centre Hospitalier Universitaire Sainte-Justine, a pediatric and obstetric university health centre affiliated with the University of Montreal.

During the internship, she met an Italian doctor, Piero Corti, who carried out two residencies (1955/56 and 1957/58) at Sainte Justine Hospital during his postgraduate training in Pediatrics at Pavia University, Italy. He already had postgraduate specializations in radiology (1953) and neuropsychiatry (1956), both at University of Milano. Both doctors shared the desire to work where the need was greatest. but, as Corti stated, "she was always much too busy for anything else but work."

After her internship, she enrolled in Postgraduate School for Pediatric Surgery in 1958. She carried out her first two years at Hôpital Maisonneuve and Hôpital Hotel-Dieu, both in Montreal. Wanting an opportunity to complete her final period of residency abroad, she applied to several hospitals in the United States but was turned down. Some explicitly said it was because she was a woman, according to her biographer, Michel Arseneault.

In 1960 Teasdale traveled to France to carry out her final internship year at the Hôpital de la Conception in Marseille.

== Uganda ==
While working in Marseilles, Teasdale sent a postcard to Piero Corti, inviting him to visit. After visiting several hopeful sites in Africa and India, Piero Corti had chosen to work from a small 30-bed mission hospital near Gulu (Northern Uganda). He was preparing the first air cargo of equipment to be airlifted by the Italian Air Force, which was then involved in the UN Mission to the Congo, and Piero invited Teasdale to go with him "just for a couple of months" to start the surgical activity. He could only afford to pay for her travel and her cigarettes. She accepted and travelled to Uganda on the same Italian Air Force plane.

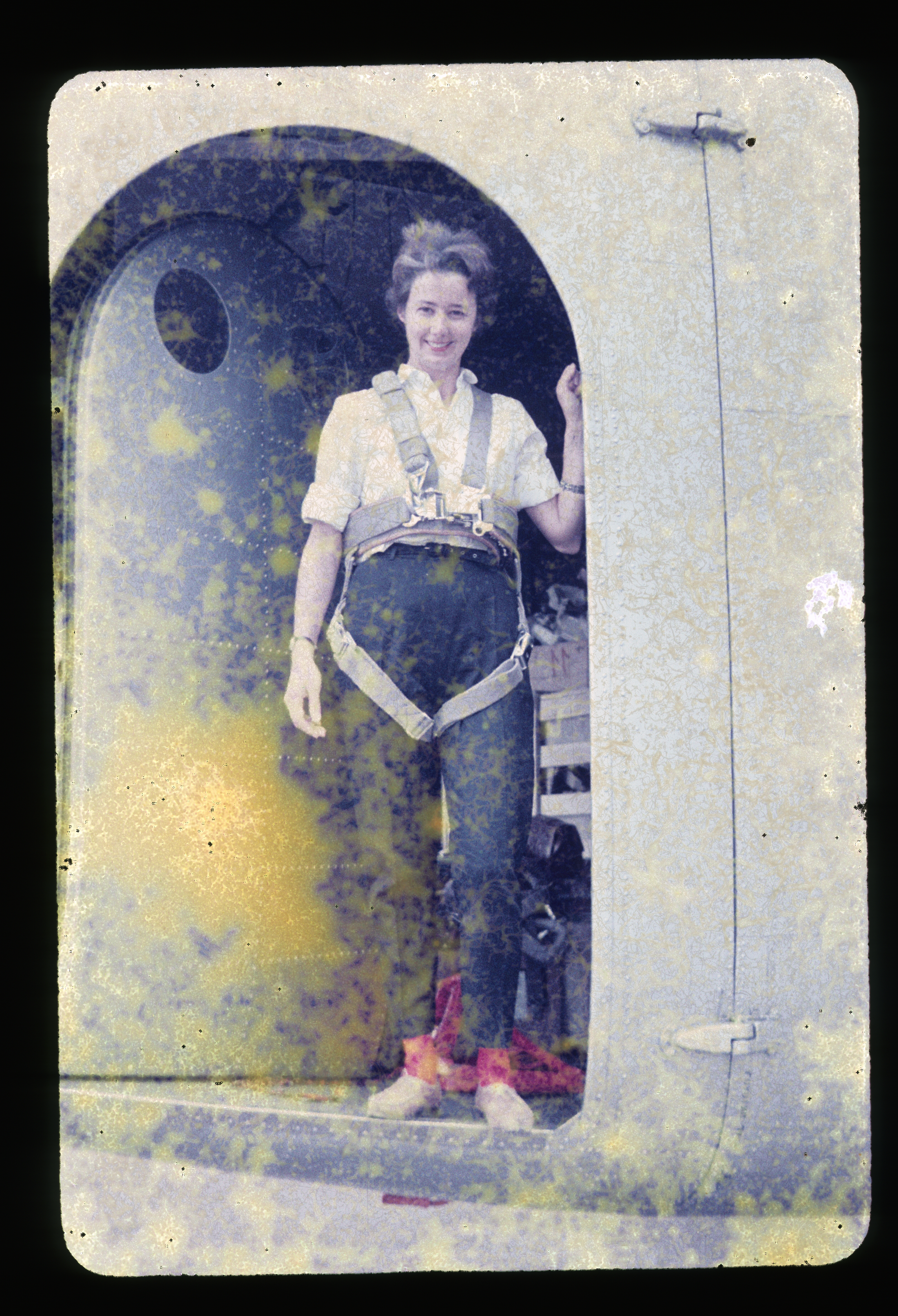

Upon arrival in Uganda in 1961, Teasdale was required to obtain a license to practice as a doctor but learned she would first have to complete two months of internship. She was referred to one of the surgeons of the capital’s Mulago University Hospital, who interviewed her and authorised her to go straight to Lacor. The surgeon was Dr Denis Parsons Burkitt, who first described and studied the distribution and etiology of pediatric cancer that bears his name: Burkitt's Lymphoma.

St. Mary’s Hospital Lacor, or simply Lacor Hospital (the regional name "Lacor" was later added to distinguish the hospital from many other institutions with the name "St. Mary’s"), is a non-profit hospital founded by the Catholic Comboni Missionaries in 1959. It lies some 5 km west of Gulu, the main town in Northern Uganda, on the road that turns north towards the Sudanese border 100 km away. It is the region of the Acholi (Acoli) people, a Luo (Lwo) Nilotic ethnic group. When Teasdale joined Lacor, the hospital had a 40-bed maternity ward and an outpatient department, while other departments, including the operating room, were under construction. Piero had decided to settle there because the Italian bishop of the Diocese who owned the hospital had agreed to allow him to manage and develop the hospital with relative independence. Piero would never ask the Diocese for money but would raise any necessary funds himself.

Teasdale's first operation was carried out on an examination bed. Thereafter she spent mornings carrying out ward rounds followed by adult outpatients and afternoons in the theatre. After extending her stay because of Piero’s need to return to Italy due to his father’s health, Teasdale went back to France. She returned to Uganda in December 1961 after accepting Piero’s marriage proposal. They married in the hospital’s chapel on 5 December 1961.

Their early dream guided them throughout their lives and remains the hospital’s guiding principle: "to offer the best possible care to the greatest number of people at the lowest possible cost" and "to train those who would replace them."

On 9 October 1962, Uganda achieved independence and on 17 November 1962, Lucille gave birth to her only child, daughter Dominique, whom locals named Atim ("born far from home" in Acholi). From this time Lucille would be known locally as "min Atim," mother of Atim. At the time, the hospital was staffed by Italian Comboni nuns who had obtained degrees in nursing and midwifery in the UK (as required by the British Protectorate in Uganda) and locals trained "on the job."

For more than 20 years, Piero and Teasdale-Corti were responsible for the initial 3 months training of newly graduated Italian doctors deciding to carry out two years’ civil service instead of the compulsory one-year military service. They were sent through Italian government aid projects to work in seven mission and two government hospitals in northern Uganda, including St. Mary’s. The mission hospitals depended almost exclusively on these doctors.

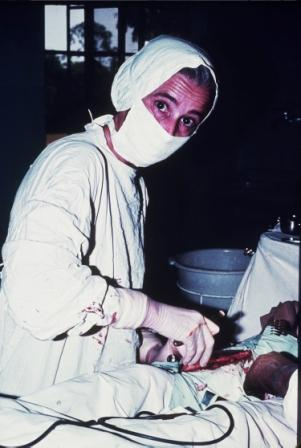
Lucille in the theater

Despite Milton Obote assuming the Ugandan presidency and changing the constitution to vest considerable power in his own hands in 1967/68, the country enjoyed relative peace until the chief of armed forces Idi Amin Dada took power with an armed coup in 1971. In 1972, Amin expelled 60,000 Asians whose ancestors had settled in Uganda during colonial times, and handed their businesses and properties to his supporters. As a result of neglect and mismanagement, the country’s economy and infrastructure collapsed. Piero and Teasdale-Corti had to decide whether to leave, as most expatriates did, or to find a way of keeping the hospital running. They decided to remain and, with Piero’s family in Italy, organized the support group that began sending several containers a year with everything from drugs to equipment to used clothes.

However, they also made the difficult decision to send their daughter away for security reasons and for studies as the school system was also collapsing. Dominique had lived within the hospital compound since birth and had been taken by Lucille to the wards and operating room when her Ugandan nurse was absent. She had gone to the local primary school. Now Dominique would only return to Lacor for her holidays. She was sent to one of her aunts in Italy and then to a boarding school in Kenya, from where she could travel back to Uganda three times a year for her holidays. Lucille, whose only condition upon marrying Piero had been that their family would never be separated, stated that sending her daughter away was the biggest sacrifice she ever made.

The first serious period of insecurity the hospital suffered was during the Uganda-Tanzania War, leading to Idi Amin’s overthrow in 1979. The hospital was repeatedly ransacked by the remnants of Idi Amin’s disbanded army fleeing from the advancing Tanzanian troops. During those months the hospital was cut off from the rest of the world, which was unaware of conditions inside. Lucille found herself undertaking an unprecedented number of operations as a result of the war and the ensuing vendettas among tribes. While Lucille was operating on a wounded soldier, Piero suffered a punctured eardrum because of a blow to the ear and was narrowly missed by machine gun fire during one confrontation with marauders. When the Tanzanian army arrived at the hospital, a commander stated that Lacor was the first hospital they had found open and functioning since they entered the country more than four months before and 600 km to the south.

1980 – After several interim and two increasingly turbulent and brief provisional governments, Milton Obote returned to power as president of Uganda. Civil war broke out, and in the four-year military effort to destroy its challengers, Obote’s second government was responsible for a greater death toll than the estimated 300,000 deaths during the seven years of Idi Amin’s rule. It is estimated that over 500,000 Ugandans died and vast areas of land were devastated during Obote’s presidency.

1982 – Victims of a mysterious "slim" disease (soon to be known as HIV/AIDS) began to appear at Lacor Hospital. Lucille started experiencing the first symptoms of what would later be recognized as opportunistic diseases linked to AIDS. Teasdale-Corti would test HIV-positive in 1985, when the first tests became available in Italy. Piero and Teasdale-Corti date the infection back to 1979, when she started carrying out much surgery on war casualties, when she often cut herself with sharp fragments from shattered bones.

1983 – The Uganda Ministry of Health recognized Lacor as an internship training centre for newly graduated doctors from the Government Medical Faculty of Makerere (later also of Mbarara, founded in 1989, and of Gulu, founded in 2003). These doctors could now carry out their compulsory one-year internship at Lacor Hospital and then remain to work in Lacor or in other Catholic non-profit hospitals. The Italian Ministry of Foreign Affairs offered significant support to Lacor through specialists to train the interns, as well as facilities and equipment. By the end of the 1980s the Italian Government was among the major contributors to International Foreign Aid by European governments and Uganda represented one of its major recipients, especially through health programs both to government and non-government institutions.

Teasdale-Corti was on the frontline of training these young doctors. The very first group of interns included Dr. Matthew Lukwiya (who would soon become the hospital’s deputy superintendent and who would die a hero’s death by sacrificing his life, together with twelve other staff members during the 2000 Ebola outbreak), Dr. Isaac Ezati (who would take over as surgeon at Lacor before moving to Mulago National Referral Hospital and then to the Ministry of Health; he remains on Lacor’s Board of Governors). Among the next groups of medical interns were Dr. Opira Cyprian in 1985 (now Lacor Hospital’s Executive Director), Dr. Odong Emintone in 1989 (now medical director), and Dr. Ogwang Martin (now Institutional Director).

In 1986, after the second ousting of Milton Obote, a weak coalition governed until the end of the year, when Yoweri Museveni’s NRA rebellion took power. The ousted army was mostly from the North, where the dissent led to the formation of rebel groups. In 1987 Alice Lakwena, a young Acholi spirit-medium, formed the Holy Spirit Movement (HSM) into which most rebel movements in the north merged. After a series of spectacular victories against what was perceived as the occupying army, she led her forces towards Kampala, garnering much support from other ethnic groups that also had grievances with the Museveni government. Lakwena’s forces were defeated.

From 1986, the hospital was repeatedly looted by rebels at night, sometimes several times a week. The rebels held the staff and patients at gunpoint looking for money and drugs. Piero and Teasdale-Corti were also held at gunpoint several times within their home, the residence within the compound closest to the hospital gate. When they couldn't find what they wanted, they kidnapped the nurses to force the hospital to pay a ransom. Most of the staff lived within the hospital compound with their families for security, and went to work at night in civilian clothing to avoid being recognised and kidnapped in case of a rebel raid. This heroic dedication and resilience by the staff went on for years.

In 1989, the Lord’s Resistance Army (LRA) emerged as a new faction in Northern Uganda’s insurgency. In that year, the rebels entered the hospital one night looking for "Dr. Corti and Min Atim," Piero and Lucille, who had just left on holiday. Dr. Matthew, who had moved to the Cortis’ house to stop a possible rebel incursion before it reached the other doctors’ residences, offered himself as the person in charge of the hospital, and was taken away with other staff. Piero and Lucille returned immediately and decided to close down the hospital. However, the local elders reacted to this news, stating that the hospital was the only thing left to them: they would not accept its closure and would try to convince the rebels not to enter again. The hospital would not experience a rebel incursion during the following fifteen years of escalating LRA civil conflict, which would often surround the hospital. The hospital built a wall around the hospital to protect those within from flying bullets.

Teasdale-Corti was diagnosed with AIDS in 1985, when the first tests became available in Italy. Before the results were available, she was referred to Prof Anthony Pinching in London, who was among the first to study the disease in the UK. He told her that her previous opportunistic diseases were indicative of her condition. He also told her that morale was important and she could continue her clinical work. Regarding surgery, which worried Teasdale-Corti, she was told that there was not much alternative for patient survival in a context where she was still the only experienced surgeon available.

Despite her failing health, she continued to work, especially in Lacor’s adult outpatient and AIDS/TB department, and gradually relinquished operations to the Ugandan doctors she had trained. She suffered from a series of complications, from the ever-present oral candidiasis that made eating difficult, to severe conditions like Addison’s Disease and Pneumocystis Carinii pleumonia, which caused Piero to rush her to London then to Milano to overcome the crises. A few months before her death, with her weight down to 40 kg, she was still carrying out 4 to 6 hours of outpatient clinics a day. She was sometimes too weak to get up in the morning so Piero or others placed an IV line to rehydrate her. As soon as she felt better, she removed the needle herself and went to work. In a last attempt to improve a worsening condition, Piero rushed Teasdale-Corti to Italy. She died in their home in Besana in Brianza on 1 August 1996.

In her career at Lacor Hospital, she performed more than 13,000 operations. The hospital’s 1996 annual report registered 446 beds, 13,437 admitted and 116,953 outpatients treated at the main Hospital, while the two functioning Peripheral Health Centres (a third was closed due to insecurity) registered 48 beds, 399 admitted and 11.549 outpatients. Other activities include 1,114 deliveries, 1,278 major surgeries and 33,613 doses of vaccine administered despite the conflict.

Teasdale-Corti's body was returned to Uganda while the insurgency surrounding the hospital was at one of its worst moments. The military had airlifted her and Piero with a helicopter when they had left Lacor because the roads were too dangerous. Thousands of "night commuters," mostly children and women, sought shelter within the hospital each night from the rebels who raided the villages at night to loot, kill and abduct children between ages 6 and 14. The funeral service for Teasdale-Corti was held in the nearby cathedral and was attended by hundreds. Some staff even travelled up to 40 km on foot from the health centres despite the risk of ambushes and landmines on the roads. The military even positioned an armed tank outside the cathedral for the mourners’ protection. She was interred in one of the hospital’s courtyards.

== Honours, tributes and recognition ==
Year	Award	Awarding body	Notes
1972	Missione del Medico – Angelo De Gasperis	Carlo Erba, Milano	Also awarded to Piero
1982	Order of Merit of the Italian Republic (Officer)	President of the Republic	Also awarded to Piero
1983	Premio della Bontà Notte di Natale Angelo Motta	Fondazione Pro Juventute Don Gnocchi	Also awarded to Piero
1984	Ambrogino d’Oro	Municipality of Milan	Also awarded to Piero
1986	Paul Harris Fellow Recognition	Rotary Club International Italy	
1986	Sasakawa Health Prize	World Health Organization	Also awarded to Piero
1987	Frederick Newton Gisborn Starr Award	Canadian Medical Association	
1990	International Medical Women Association Award Italy		
1991	Order of Canada	Government of Canada	
1993	Cuore Amico Prize Italy		Also awarded to Piero
1995	Honorary Consultant, Ministry of Health of Uganda	Uganda Ministry of Health and Makerere University Senate	
1995	National Order of Quebec (Grand Officier)	Government of the Province of Quebec	
1995	Prix d’Excellence pour la Cause Africaine	CICA New York	
1995	Velan Award	Rotary Club Montreal	
1995	Premio Professionalità	Rotary Club Milano	Also awarded to Piero
1995	Honorary Fellow	Royal College of Physicians and Surgeons of Canada	
1995	Premio Antonio Feltrinelli	Accademia dei Lincei	Awarded to the Lacor Hospital
1996	Doctorate Honoris Causa	University of Montreal	

=== In memoriam ===
Year	Award	Awarding body	Notes
1996	Premio Speciale Cuore D’Oro	Premio della Bontà Motta, Notte di Natale Milan	
1997	Premio Moscati Caserta Italy		
1999	Parc Lucille-Teasdale in Montreal		Located 45°17′45″N 73°21′21″W45.2959°N 73.3559°W
2000	46 cent stamp in Lucille Teasdale’s honour	Canada Post	
2001	Inducted	Canadian Medical Hall of Fame	
2001	Lucille-Teasdale Secondary School in Blainville, Quebec		
2004	Gold Medal, Order of Civil Merit	President of the Italian Republic	Also awarded to Piero
2013	Lucille-Teasdale International School in Brossard, Quebec		

Also Centre de Santé et de Services Sociaux (CSSS) in Montreal was named in her honour in Montreal as well as a road, Boulevard Lucille Teasdale.
