= Eva Siracká =

Slovak physician (1926–2023)

- Siracká in 2018
- Born: 1 May 1926; Uherské Hradiště, Czechoslovakia
- Died: 21 February 2023 (aged 96)
- Citizenship: Czechoslovakia; Slovakia
- Awards: National award, Slovakia (1983); Order of Ľudovít Štúr (2000); Pribina Cross (2006); Sasakawa Health Prize (2011); European Citizen's Prize (2015)

Academic background
- Education: Comenius University
- Thesis: Oxygen Effect on Tumour Cells and Their Sensitivity Towards Radiation (1964)
- Medical career
- Field: Physician
- Research: Oncology; radiotherapy

Eva Siracká (1 May 1926 – 21 February 2023) was a Slovak physician. Between 1990 and 2020, she served as the president of the League Against Cancer NGO. In 2011, she became the first European woman to receive the Sasakawa Health Prize, awarded by the World Health Organisation. She is considered one of the "Greatest Slovaks".

== Early life ==
Eva Siracká was born on 1 May 1926 in Uherské Hradiště in the Czech part of Czechoslovakia, but lived in Slovakia since her childhood. She studied at the Faculty of Medicine of the Comenius University in Bratislava from 1945 to 1951 with a focus on cancer as she carried out her practice at St. Elizabeth Cancer Institute Hospital.

== Career ==
After graduation, she worked at the Oncology Institute in Bratislava. She was the first woman in Slovakia to work in the field of radiotherapy, researching the oxygen effect on tumour cells and their sensitivity towards radiation. She successfully defended her thesis in 1964.

In 1969, she received a six-month scholarship at the Karolinska Institute in Stockholm. Later, she devoted herself to clinically-oriented research at the Institute of Experimental Oncology at the Slovak Academy of Sciences until 1991. During her tenure, she also visited foreign workplaces and worked in Berlin for one year.

=== League Against Cancer ===
In 1990, Siracká founded the League Against Cancer in Bratislava. She was the president of the League Against Cancer since its inception. In a 2016 interview, she jokingly said that "as long as the British Queen, who is my age, reigns, I will not be able to leave the Cancer League." However, she stepped down on 31 December 2020, aged 93.

== Political positions ==
In 2014, Siracká supported enshrining marriage in the constitution as a union between a man and a woman, which was pushed by the Christian Democratic Movement (KDH); this would also prevent judicial extension of marriage rights to same-sex couples. The KDH invited Siracká to present the proposal to Parliament with their chairman Ján Figeľ. In June 2014, it was passed and signed into law by President Ivan Gašparovič, with 102 of Slovakia's National Council's members voting for and 18 against.

== Personal life and death ==
Siracká was famous for saying, "Human stupidity is worse than cancer."

Siracká died on 21 February 2023, at the age of 96. President Zuzana Čaputová paid homage to Siracká's life after her death, stressing her contribution to increasing awareness about cancer in Slovakia. The speaker of the Slovak parliament Boris Kollár likewise paid homage to Siracká.

== Awards and honours ==
- 1983 National award for work dedicated to radiological research
- 2000 Order of Ľudovít Štúr, 3rd Class, for long-term professional and scientific research activity in oncology with a focus on radiotherapy, and the main contribution to the creation of the League Against Cancer and its activities
- 2006 Woman of the 21st Century award for lifelong contribution to the representation of Slovak women in the world
- 2006 Pribina Cross, first class, for significant merits and development of the Slovak Republic in the field of healthcare
- 2011 Sasakawa Health Prize bestowed by the World Health Organization. She was the first European woman to receive the award
- 2014 Bratislava's Personality of the Year
- 2015 European Citizen's Prize bestowed by the European Parliament

=== The Greatest Slovaks ===
Siracká was considered one of the 100 "Greatest Slovaks" according to a poll organised by Radio and Television of Slovakia (RTVS), which took place between October 2018 and May 2019.
