= Eugenio Corti =

Italian writer (1921–2014)

Eugenio Corti (21 January 1921 – 4 February 2014) was an Italian writer born in Besana in Brianza. After participating in the Italian retreat from Russia in World War II, and a period of recovery, he joined the regular Italian army in southern Italy, to fight the Germans along with the Allies. Based on these experiences, he wrote Few Returned and The Last Soldiers of the King. His seminal work, however, is The Red Horse, a 1000-page novel again based on his experiences and those of his fellow Italians during and after the Second World War. It was voted the best book of the 1980s in a public survey in Italy and has been translated into eight languages, including Japanese. It has had thirty-four editions since it was first published in May 1983.

== Awards and other initiatives ==
In summer 1994, a poll promoted by the newspaper Avvenire revealed that Corti was the most popular Christian writer in Italy. Corti received the international award of the Golden Medal for Merit of the Catholic Culture in 2000. In May 2005, the "Eugenio Corti" international cultural association was officially formed. The association was born from the initiative of some readers, mostly young college students and professionals, and was aimed at publicizing the writer and his works to the world of culture and to the larger public, as well as, more in general, making culture with Corti's figure as an inspiration. One of the main activities of the association is the promotion of lectures and meetings.

On 7 December 2007, the Comune (Council) of Milan awarded Corti the Ambrogino d'Oro. Between June and July 2008, the weekly Famiglia Cristiana sold The Red Horse in attachment to the magazine, in three volumes. In November 2009, following an official poll which appeared in the French weekly Le Figaro magazine, The Red Horse was pointed out by critic Étienne de Montety as the most important novel to appear in France in the last 25 years. On 18 December 2009, the Province of Milano awarded Corti the prestigious Prize Isimbardi, for citizens and associations promoting worthy initiatives in favour of the Milan community.

On 9 February 2010, the Lombard regional council gave him the "Lombardy for Work" prize, an acknowledgement for the inspiration, industry and creativity of citizens who may have contributed significantly to the economic and social development of Lombardy in the field of work and enterprise. Specifically, Corti received the award for cultural merits. On 6 March 2010, during the meeting called "Eugenio Corti, Brianza and the world: the rediscovery of the Brianza model for the global society in the Third Millennium" that took place in Monza, the committee for Eugenio Corti's Nobel Prize candidacy was officially introduced. On 22 April 2010, in Monza, Corti received one of the special prizes of the "BtoB Awards - Dale Carnegie Training", an event arranged by the Best to Brianza magazine and sponsored by the Italian branch of Dale Carnegie Italia with support from the council of the Province of Monza and Brianza.

Via his grandmother, Corti was a first cousin twice removed of Pope Pius X.

== Nobel Prize candidacy ==
In March 2010, ACIEC (Associazione Culturale Internazionale Eugenio Corti), founded in his honour, started a petition through its website. The aim of the petition is to compel the Swedish Academy to make Corti a candidate for the Nobel Prize for literature. As of September 2010, the petition has been signed by several thousand supporters.

== Death ==
On 4 February 2014 Corti, aged 93, died at his home in Besana in Brianza.

== Works ==
=== Novels ===
- I più non ritornano (Few Returned) (1947)
- Il cavallo rosso (The Red Horse) (1983)
- Gli ultimi soldati del Re (Last soldiers of the King) (1994)
- Il Medioevo e altri racconti (2008)

=== Plays ===
- Processo e morte di Stalin (1962)

=== Essays ===
- Il fumo nel tempio (1995)
- Breve storia della Democrazia Cristiana, con particolare riguardo ai suoi errori (1995)
- Le responsabilità della cultura occidentale nelle grandi stragi del nostro secolo (1998)
- Processo e morte di Stalin (con altri testi sul comunismo) (1999)

=== Pictorial narrations ===
- La terra dell'indio (1998)
- L'isola del paradiso (2000)
- Catone l'antico (2005)
