= Royal College of Physicians and Surgeons of Canada =

Canadian regulatory authority

- Collège royal des médecins et chirurgiens du Canada
- Formation: 1929; 97 years ago
- Type: Medical royal college
- Legal status: active
- Purpose: oversee medical education and professional development, advocate and public voice, network
- Headquarters: Ottawa, Ontario, Canada
- Region served: Canada
- Members: medical specialists
- Official language: English, French
- Website: www.royalcollege.ca

The Royal College of Physicians and Surgeons of Canada (French: Collège royal des médecins et chirurgiens du Canada) is a regulatory college which acts as a national, nonprofit organization established in 1929 by a special Act of Parliament to oversee the medical education of specialists in Canada.

The Royal College is an association of physicians concerned with setting national standards for medical education and continuing professional development in Canada for 80 medical specialties. As such, the Royal College is neither a licensing nor a disciplinary body. Instead, it is a regulatory authority that helps ensure that the training and evaluation of medical and surgical specialists and two special programs maintain certain standards of quality.

All specialists in Canada, with the exception of family physicians, must be certified by the Royal College before they obtain a provincial or territorial licence to practice. The only exception is in the province of Quebec, where the Royal College shares the responsibility for certifying physicians with the Collège des médecins du Québec.

To become certified, a physician must pass Royal College examinations. Access to these examinations is usually gained by completing a Royal College-accredited residency program at a Canadian university. Access is also available for medical residents who complete a Royal College-recognized residency program in the United States. Certain international training programs approved by the Royal College provide limited access to Royal College examinations.

Since its founding, the Royal College has been granted the patronage of the Canadian monarch, currently Charles III.

== History ==
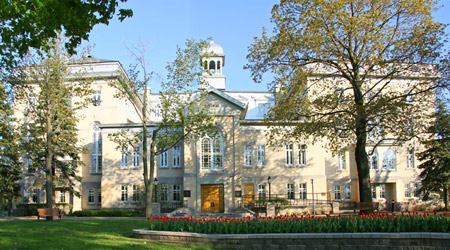
The Royal College headquarters at 774 Echo Drive in Ottawa, Canada

In June 1929, a special Act of Parliament established the Royal College of Physicians and Surgeons of Canada to oversee postgraduate medical education in Canada. At first, the Royal College offered just two specialty qualifications: Fellowship in general medicine and Fellowship in general surgery. By 2014, the Royal College had expanded its activities to recognize 80 disciplines, granting Fellowships in 30 specialties, 35 subspecialties, two special programs and 13 Areas of Focused Competence (AFC-diplomas).

From the 1940s to the 1970s, the Royal College conducted examinations at two levels in most specialties: Fellowship, the higher qualification, or Certification, a lesser designation. In 1972, the Royal College abolished this dual standard and began to offer a single certification that continues today: Fellowship.

In 1968, the Royal College established the McLaughlin Examination and Research Centre at the University of Alberta and Laval University to research and develop modern techniques for evaluating specialist physicians. In 1987, the Royal College merged the centre into a bilingual McLaughlin Centre based in Ottawa, Ontario.

Since the mid-1980s, the Royal College has broadened its activities to study areas of special interest in Canadian healthcare, including injury prevention and patient safety. In 2005, the Royal College set a specific goal to improve the health of Indigenous Peoples in Canada.

Today, the headquarters for the Royal College is located at 774 Echo Drive in Ottawa, Ontario. The building, constructed in 1921, was formerly the monastery of the Sisters Adorers of the Precious Blood.

== Objectives ==
The work of the Royal College centres around its prime objective — to ensure the highest possible standards of specialist training and specialist care. The Royal College undertakes work under the following six areas:

- Prescribes the requirements for specialty education in 80 areas of medical, surgical and laboratory medicine plus two special programs,
- Accredits specialty residency programs,
- Assesses the acceptability of residents' education,
- Conducts certifying examinations,
- Administers the Maintenance of Certification Program, a mandatory continuing professional development program for all members, and
- Sets standards for professional and ethical conduct among its members.

== Membership ==
In 2014, the Royal College had more than 44,000 members worldwide, including Fellows, residents, and honorary, retired, and emeritus members.

Fellows of the Royal College use the designation FRCPC (Fellow of The Royal College of Physicians of Canada) or FRCSC (Fellow of The Royal College of Surgeons of Canada) depending on their qualifications. Since 1997, the Royal College has also offered category of resident membership called "resident affiliate" in an attempt to engage residents at an early stage of their careers. Those who choose to join the Royal College receive complimentary membership during the time they are registered in a Royal College-accredited residency program. Approximately 2,000 members are designated as resident members.

The Royal College website includes a directory of all current and retired Fellows.

== International medical graduates ==
An international medical graduate is someone who has completed his or her medical training outside of Canada or the United States and whose medical training is recognized by the World Health Organization. There are 29 international jurisdictions that the Royal College has assessed and deemed as having met Royal College criteria. For the graduates of these particular jurisdictions, the College assesses their training to determine the extent to which they have successfully met and completed the Royal College training requirements. When the training is deemed comparable and acceptable, the IMGs are ruled eligible to take the Royal College certification examination. Success at the certification examination will lead to Royal College certification. The Royal College accepts training from some international jurisdictions that have similar residency training accreditation systems to Canada.

== Work with other medical organizations ==
The Royal College maintains close working relations with the 17 Canadian university medical schools, numerous national professional associations, voluntary health organizations and governmental agencies where it has a respected and influential voice in discussions affecting medical education, medical research and the delivery of high-quality health care to Canadians. In some cases, the Royal College accredits training programs conjointly with other professional organizations. In addition, Royal College training programs are sometimes cited as requirements for specific levels of remuneration for resident physicians.

The Royal College co-sponsored the 10th Annual International Conference on Medical Regulation, which took place at the Ottawa Convention Centre in Ontario, Canada, in October 2012.

== Continuing professional development ==
The Royal College develops and administers a continuing professional development program called Maintenance of Certification (MOC) that requires Fellows to engage in certain activities to maintain their competence throughout their careers. Introduced in 2000, MOC is a core service delivered by the Royal College and is also open to health care professionals who are not Fellows and not physicians. The program awards credits to participants who engage in learning activities that enhance their practice. Elements of the MOC Program are recognized by medical associations in other countries, including the American Medical Association (which allows its members to convert certain MOC credits to AMA PRA Category 1 credits) and the American College of Physicians.

== CanMEDS ==
In 1996, the Royal College adopted CanMEDS, a medical education framework it developed that emphasizes the essential competencies of a physician. Revised in 2005, the CanMEDS competencies have now been integrated into the Royal College's accreditation standards, objectives of training, final in-training evaluations, exam blueprints, and the Maintenance of Certification program. All 17 medical schools in Canada also use the framework to assess the abilities of their residents. The Royal College is now updating the framework to further align it with a competency-based approach to medical education. The revised CanMEDS framework launched in 2015.

Since its creation, CanMEDS has been adopted and adapted around the world. CanMEDS is an educational framework identifying and describing seven roles that lead to optimal health and health care outcomes: medical expert (central role), communicator, collaborator, manager, health advocate, scholar and professional. The overarching goal of CanMEDS is to improve patient care.

== Competency-based medical education ==
Competency-based medical education, or CBME, is an outcomes-based approach to the design, implementation, assessment and evaluation of a medical education program using an organizing framework of competencies. In 2012, the Royal College began a multi-year plan to design, develop, implement and sustain a program of CBME. Under CBME, medical education (for residents in training and specialist physicians who pursue lifelong learning) progresses not according to how much time a resident or certified physician has practised certain skills, as has been the case in the past in Canada. Instead, it progresses under a system in which residents and certified physicians must achieve and demonstrate core competency levels called "milestones" before they move on, receive credit or are otherwise recognized by the system.

In 2013, the Royal College announced Competence by Design, the name that the organization has given to its reorientation toward a CBME model of learning and assessment (The CanMEDS Framework, first introduced in 1997, sets out the competencies and principles considered essential for Canadian physicians). As of 2014, the Royal College's move toward CBME and Competence by Design was received with mixed reactions from Royal College Fellows.

== Health and educational policy work ==
The Royal College engages regularly in work to affect health policy, especially in the areas of physician employment and resident duty hours.

Physician employment: In 2013, the Royal College released the results of a Canada-wide study that showed an increasing number of specialists cannot find jobs relevant to their skills and training.

Resident Duty Hours: In 2013 the National Steering Committee on Resident Duty Hours, hosted by the Royal College with funding from Health Canada, released a report called Fatigue, Risk and Excellence: Toward a Pan-Canadian consensus on resident duty hours. The steering committee's research process and subsequent report were widely received as robust and a major step forward in the controversial debate about duty hours.

== Awards and grants ==
The Royal College's awards and grants program distributes $1 million a year in awards, grants, fellowships and visiting professorships. Awards recognize the importance and potential impact of specialist physicians' work and categories include original research, personal achievements and visiting professorships. Grants support professional development and research, with categories covering continuing professional development grants, travelling fellowships and medical education grants.

Among the more notable Royal College awards is the Teasdale-Corti Humanitarian Award which recognizes physicians and surgeons who, while providing health care or emergency medical services, go beyond the accepted norms of routine practice, which may include exposure to personal risk. The award is named in honour of Dr. Lucille Teasdale and Dr. Piero Corti, a physician couple who devoted their professional careers to healing, teaching, and improving the condition of the population residing in the poverty stricken Gulu region of Uganda. Past recipients have worked throughout the world, including in Africa, Europe and South America.

The International Medical Educator of the Year Award is given to an international medical educator who has demonstrated lasting impact and a commitment to enhancing ethics and humanism in residency education. In 2019, the prize was awarded to Dr. Melchor Sánchez Mendiola, MD, MHPE, PhD, from National Autonomous University of Mexico.

== See also ==
- Canadian Medical Association
- Medical Council of Canada
- List of Canadian organizations with royal patronage
- Royal College of Physicians
- Royal College of Surgeons
- College of Family Physicians of Canada
- Collège des médecins du Québec
