= MORHAN =

Together, we will eliminate leprosy

MORHAN (Movimento de Reintegração das Pessoas Atingidas pela Hanseníase or in English Movement of Reintegration of Persons Afflicted by Hansen's Disease) is a non-profit organization that operates to reduce leprosy and the stigma of leprosy in Brazil. This organization was initially created to ensure the rights of patients from leper colonies due to their isolation, and today it is one of the most successful Brazilian social movements, with representation in the National Health Council. The group has used several methods to disseminate information about leprosy including, but not limited to, handing out pamphlets, hosting seminars, and organizing puppet shows for children. Morhan also creates its own publications as a means of mobilization and news regarding leprosy. Furthermore, Morhan has worked with anthropologists to provide explanatory models and lay explanations of leprosy within the Brazilian context. Morhan's work has been exemplary in creating partnerships between social groups and the government and received an award from the United Nations' Millennium Development Goals. The current National Coordinator is Artur Custodio Moreira de Souza.

== Mission ==
Morhan's primary mission is to make people in society understand that leprosy is a curable diseases and to eliminate discrimination and stigma surrounding leprosy.

== Vision ==
Morhan's vision is to continue to be an informational resource about leprosy, to support those afflicted with leprosy in Brazil, and to be a reference on treatment and human rights.

== Objectives ==
Morhan has statutory objectives, which include but are not limited to:

- Work towards the elimination of leprosy
- Assist in healing, rehabilitation and social reintegration of persons who contracted leprosy
- Advocate for people affected by leprosy to not suffer restrictions in their social life (job, family, church, school ...)
- Contribute to conquer the leprosy stigma and help patients exercise full citizenship
- Ensure housing, care, and support to people with leprosy in the time of compulsory isolation (30–60 days)

== History ==
Morhan was established on June 6, 1981, by eight people in São Paulo, Brazil, whom had met through extensive research on leprosy or having lived in centers for people afflicted with leprosy. Morhan first emerged as an organization for the physically handicapped in general, although a specific group for those disabled by Hansen's disease or leprosy was set up soon afterwards. Support was mobilized mainly among former patients, or those still living in leper colony hospitals. Morhan shattered the stigmatized image of a movement in search of charity by adopting an approach to defend the rights of citizens. Morhan's participation in Hansen's disease control policymaking was made official nationwide in 1986, influencing the make-up of state technical commissions and municipal health councils.

=== Founders ===
Francisco Augusto Vieira Nunes, or as he was affectionately named Bacurau, was one of the primary leaders in establishing Morhan in 1981. Bacurau contracted leprosy at the age of 5 in the 1940s and he was sent to live in a leper colony for most of his adolescence. Bacurau was Morhan's first National Coordinator. Thomas Frist, a North American social scientist who, at the end of the 1970s and the start of the 1980s, set up a project involving patients from the communities surrounding the old leper colony hospitals was also one of the founders of Morhan. Another founder Cristiano Torres, who spent time in prevention centers and leper colony hospitals since his childhood was a leading figure in the process to resocialize patients from the Marituba Colony in Belém, Pará. He is the regional coordinator in his state and has been a member of the Morhan board.

=== Celebrity involvement ===
Celebrity involvement in Morhan's mission, vision, and objectives has been an integral part of disseminating awareness of leprosy in Brazil. In 1988, Pelé, the retired soccer player, lent his name to the cause, although he is no longer involved. In 1999, Morhan began working on leprosy education with Rosinha Garotinho, who was married to Rio de Janeiro's governor at the time. In 2002, Ney Matogrosso, a Brazilian singer, guest-starred on one of the most popular novelas (soap opera miniseries) in Brazilian history, The Clone, and the novela writer Gloria Perez incorporated a segment on leprosy into the script. Matogrosso's support was not only to strengthen Morhan's brand, but also to step up political pressure to prioritize public campaigns on the disease in Brazil. Novela actress Solange Couto, who also starred in The Clone, subsequently became involved with Morhan as well. Although there has been celebrity involvement, Morhan has yet to find a celebrity who has been afflicted with leprosy to do advocacy work.

== Locations ==
The movement's regional centers include practically all of Brazil's states and most of the leading municipalities. Currently, Morhan is present in nearly 100 communities distributed in 24 of the 27 states of the federation, and has about 3,500 volunteers. Morhan is structured with a National Coordinator and State Coordinators. Present in all Brazilian states are multiple cores and sub-cores, all assembled with volunteers. A few cores have international support Savior (Italy), the four cores of Ceará (England), and Teresina (Netherlands). The rest of the cores, try to get local donations and do fundraisers. Morhan's national entity has an agreement with the state government of Rio de Janeiro, the Novartis Foundation and is negotiating with the Ministry of Health to ensure funding. The national headquarters are located at Rua do Matoso Nº 6, sala 204 - Praça da Bandeira - Rio de Janeiro, RJ 20270-130, Brasil.

== Publications ==
One of Morhan's primary pursuits is to remain in open dialogue with society about issues surrounding leprosy and its stigma. One of the ways the non-profit converses with society is through publications, which can be found on Morhan's website. The Morhan newspaper, which has been published bi-monthly since 1982, hosts information, support, and reception of complains. Special release publications bring together the results of the National Workshop on Comprehensive Leprosy Care. The special release publications highlights how Morhan, through volunteers, the board and its National Technical Assistance, present a set of demands and proposals to the Ministry of Health, the National Health Council, and the Secretaries of State for Health. Furthermore, Morhan has been concerned with statistics disseminated by major public health institutions. Today, Morhan disseminates this information as an instrument to empower society with statistics and facts about leprosy. Morhan's publications are an important factor in the process of combating all forms of prejudice and the arduous task of leprosy as a public health problem.

== Services and partnerships ==
There are several services and partnerships Morhan provides for its patients:

- Morhan is responsible for the infrastructure of Telehansen, which is a free calling service for people with leprosy. The hotline settles doubts about the disease, directs people to the places of treatment around Brazil, and receives complaints of lack of drugs, prejudice, lack of care, and abuse.
- Morhan volunteers and members are responsible for manufacturing shoes for people with leprosy with the support of an Italian non-governmental organization.
- Morhan hosts panfletagem, educational and informational events in which volunteers distribute pamphlets about leprosy and about Morhan and its services.
- Morhan has recruited and trained women who are members of different religions to identify early leprosy symptoms and encourage people to seek biomedical treatment.
- Morhan works alongside the Brazilian Association of People with Thalidomide Syndrome to guarantee and expand social rights for people affected with thalidomide syndrome. Also, they are notified about the emergence of second-generation cases of leprosy and thalidomide syndrome. In 1988, Morhan strengthened the fight against the use of thalidomide, for the treatment of reactions of leprosy. However, now the use of thalidomide is extremely controlled by the Ministry of Health.
- Morhan in partnership with Novartis, has a vehicle (carreta de saude) that travels the country taking control of some essential services for leprosy patients.
- Cassandra White, author of “An Uncertain Cure: Living with Leprosy in Brazil”, worked with Morhan as an English-speaking liaison, translating documents, working on a World Health Organization grant proposal, and negotiating with a British cargo ship donating braces and crutches for people with leprosy.
- Morhan volunteers have made house visits to patients who have abandoned treatment.
- Morhan works in tandem with the Brazilian government to try to get legislation so that patients may go to different health posts in different cities to be treated at any stage during their treatment without having to go through the diagnostic exams again or start treatment from the beginning.
- Morhan places posters about leprosy in public buses in Rio de Janeiro in order to raise awareness and reduce stigma.

== Problems ==
Morhan has no power to ensure the social integration of young people into the labor market. Members of the movement say that discrimination still exists, though less visible than before.

In March 2012, Morhan headquarters, located in downtown Rio de Janeiro, was hit by an accidental fire. All entities were consumed by fire, but no one was injured. Morhan and its volunteers have still maintained commitments to the community despite setbacks.
