= Gulu Hospital =

Gulu Regional Referral Hospital
- Uganda Ministry of Health

Geography
- Location: Gulu, Gulu District,, Northern Region, Uganda
- Coordinates: 02°46′40″N 32°17′52″E

Organisation
- Care system: Public
- Type: General and teaching
- Affiliated university: Gulu University

Services
- Emergency department: I
- Beds: 370

Links
- Other links: Hospitals in Uganda; Medical education in Uganda

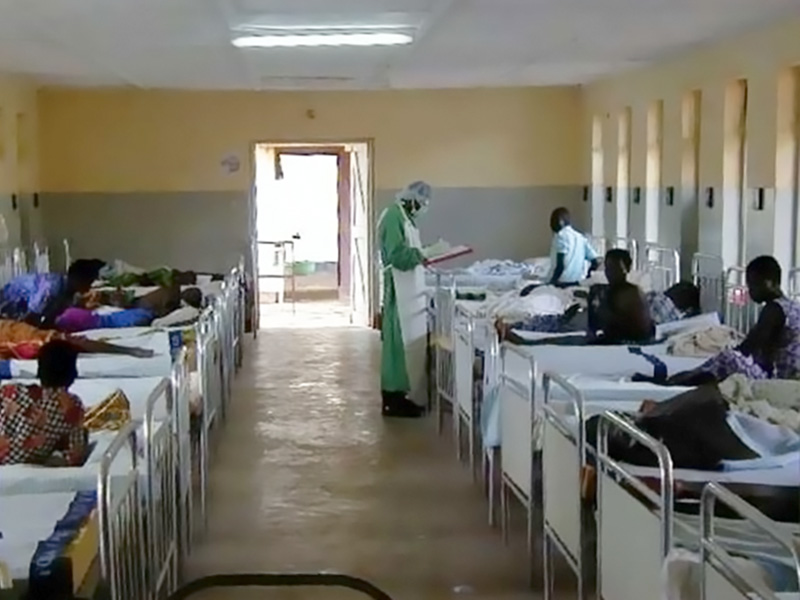
Patients undergoing treatment at Gulu municipal Hospital

Gulu Regional Referral Hospital, commonly known as Gulu Hospital is a hospital in Gulu, northern Uganda. It is the referral hospital for the districts of Amuru, Gulu, Kitgum, Lamwo and Pader. The hospital also serves as one of the teaching hospitals of Gulu University.

== Location ==
Gulu Hospital is located in the northern Ugandan city of Gulu, the largest metropolitan area in Uganda's Northern Region. Its location is approximately 101 kilometres (63 mi), by road, northwest of Lira Regional Referral Hospital. This is approximately 332 kilometres (206 mi), by road, north of Mulago National Referral Hospital, in Kampala, Uganda's capital and largest city. The geographical coordinates of Gulu Hospital are:02°46'40.0"N, 32°17'52.0"E (Latitude:2.777778; Longitude:32.297778).

== Overview ==
Gulu Hospital is a public hospital, funded by the Uganda Ministry of Health and general care in the hospital is free. It is one of the two teaching hospitals of the medical school of Gulu University. Gulu Medical School also utilizes St. Mary's Hospital Lacor, to train her doctors. Gulu Regional Referral Hospital is staffed by medical students and residents, supervised by Gulu University academic staff as well as Uganda Ministry of Health consultants.

The hospital is one of the fifteen designated Internship Hospitals in Uganda where graduates from Ugandan medical schools can complete a one-year internship under the guidance of qualified specialists and consultants. The hospital is one of the fourteen Regional Referral Hospitals in Uganda. In 2019, the capacity of Gulu Hospital is quoted as 370 beds.

== Renovations and upgrade of the facility ==
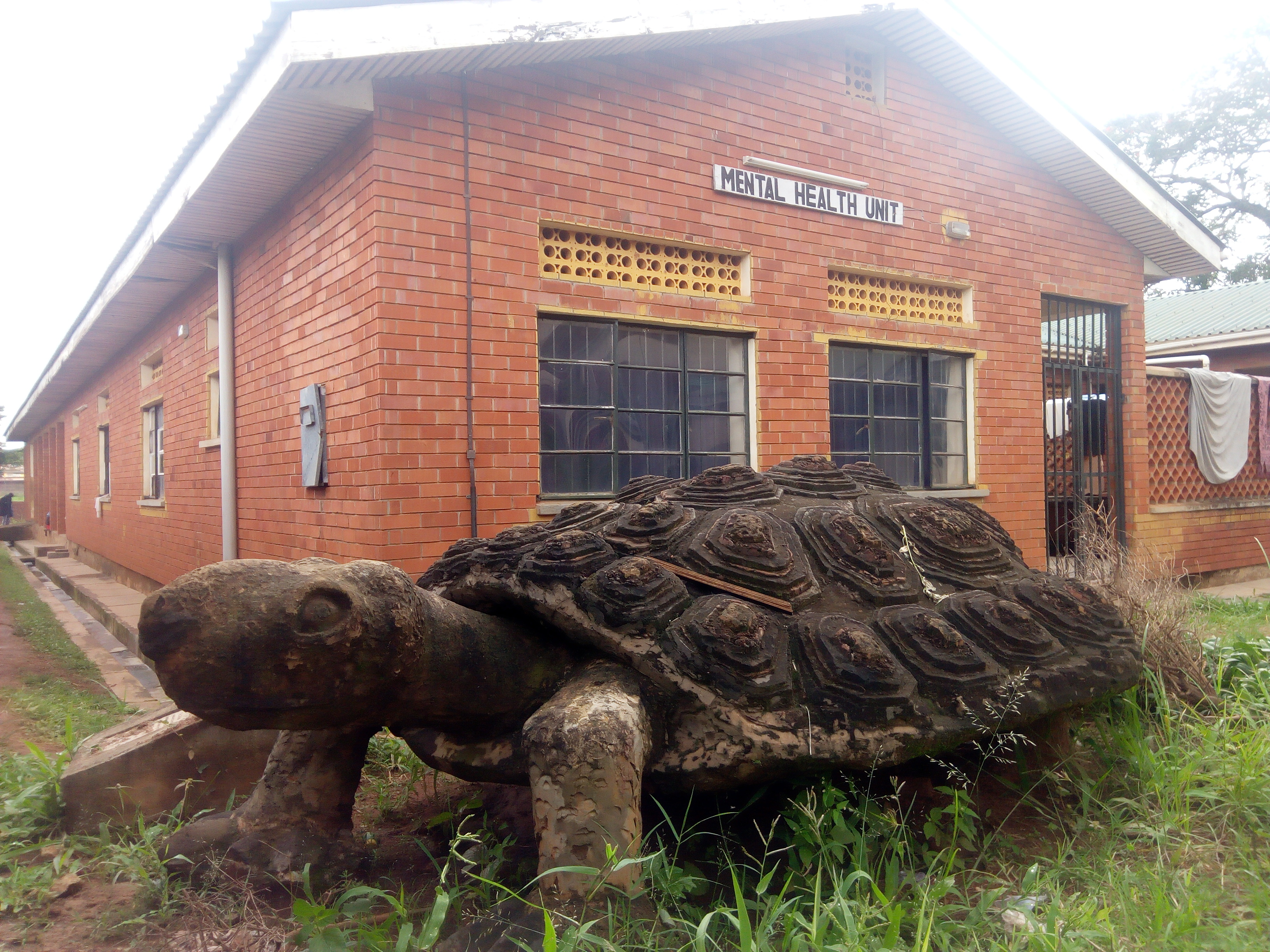
Gulu Mental Health Unit Tortoise Monument

In November 2019, the hospital began construction of a new hospital wing, comprising four operating rooms, a maternity ward and a neonatal intensive care unit. The USh20 billion (US$5.5 million) project, is co-funded by the government of Uganda and the Japan International Cooperation Agency (JICA). This is part of a USh60 billion (US$16.5 million) joint project aimed at improving and modernizing the National Regional Hospitals in Arua, Gulu and Lira. Completion of the renovations at Gulu Regional Referral Hospital are expected to conclude in October 2020. The gate upgraded into a modern entry level 2022.

== See also ==
- Acholiland
- Hospitals in Uganda
