= Besana in Brianza =

Besana in Brianza Besana Brianza (Lombard)
- Comune
- Città di Besana in Brianza
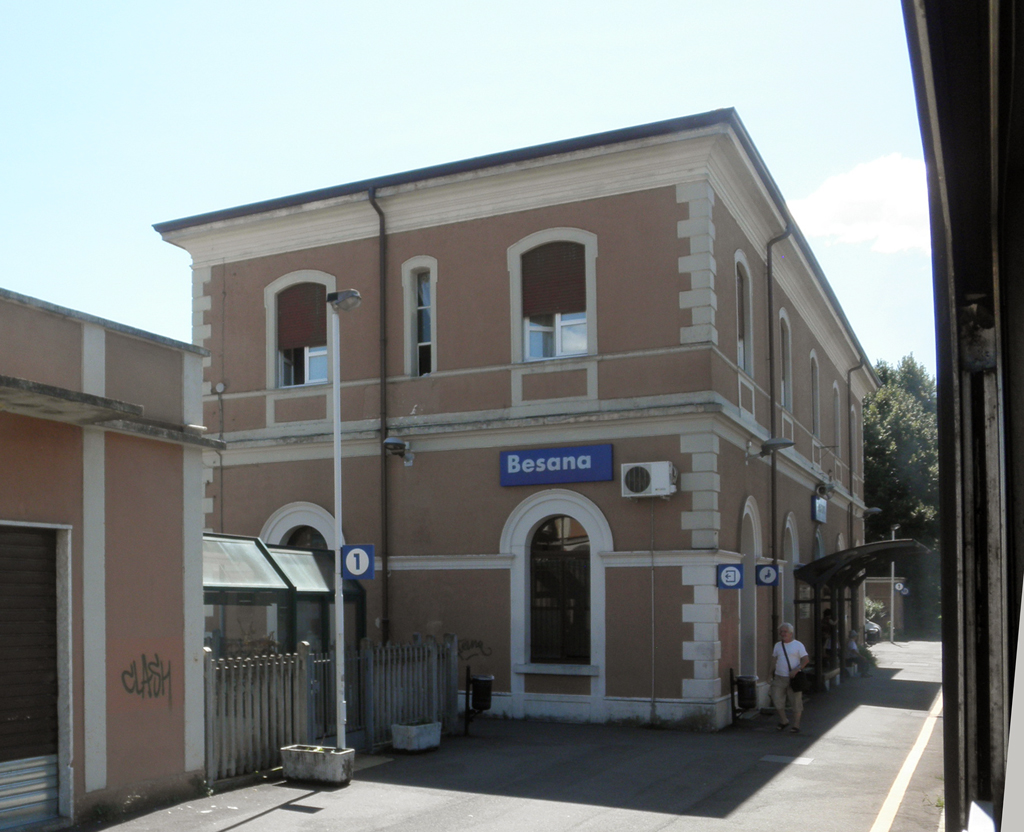
- Besana in Brianza railway station

- Coat of arms

- Location within Italy Location within Lombardy
- Coordinates: 45°42′N 9°17′E
- Country: Italy
- Region: Lombardy
- Province: Monza and Brianza (MB)
- Frazioni: Calò, Cazzano, Montesiro, Valle Guidino, Vergo Zoccorino, Villa Raverio

Government
  - Mayor: Emanuele Pozzoli (Lega)

Area
  - Total: 15.77 km^{2} (6.09 sq mi)
- Elevation: 336 m (1,102 ft)

Population (30 April 2017)
  - Total: 15,537
  - Density: 985.2/km^{2} (2,552/sq mi)
- Demonym: Italian: besanesi
- Time zone: UTC+1 (CET)
  - Summer (DST): UTC+2 (CEST)
- Postal code: 20842
- Dialing code: 0362
- Website: Official website

Besana in Brianza (Brianzoeu: Besana Brianza) is a comune (municipality) in the province of Monza and Brianza, Lombardy, Northern Italy. It received the honorary title of city with a presidential decree of 16 February 1971.

== People ==
- Carlo Gnocchi (1902–1956), blessed
- Eugenio Corti (1921–2014), writer
- Piero Corti (1925–2003), doctor
- Riccardo Muti (1941), honorary citizen
- Maddalena Crippa (1957), actress
- Demetrio Albertini (1971), footballer
- Vittorio Arrigoni (1975–2011), reporter and activist
